= Stevan Zdravković =

Serbian general and minister of public works

Mihailo Đurić
- Born: April 16, 1835
- Died: September 4, 1900 (aged 65)
- Military career
- Allegiance: Principality of Serbia
- Branch: Serbian Army
- Rank: General

Stevan Zdravković (Zivica, Principality of Serbia, 16 April 1835 - Belgrade, Kingdom of Serbia, 4 August 1900) was a Serbian general, professor and chief of the Serbian Military Academy in Belgrade, Minister of Public Works and State Adviser.

Zdravković was also a regular member of the Committee for Natural and Mathematical Sciences since 24 January 1871 and the Committee for the Dissemination of Science and Literature to the People since 1883; Secretary of the Committee for Natural and Mathematical Sciences (1881–1883); and honorary member since November 15, 1892. He also served as the 6th Dean of the Academic Board of the Military Academy in Serbia from 1880 to 1887. In 1897 he was named president of The Red Cross of Serbia, a post he held until 1899 when he was succeeded by Dragutin Franasović.

A year before the start of Serbian Wars for Independence, Zdravković held the rank of lieutenant colonel at the Serbian General Staff Headquarters and was Ranko Alimpić's subordinate.

== See also ==
- František Zach
- Mihailo Ilić (major)
- Ranko Alimpić
- Milojko Lešjanin
- Jovan Petrović (general)
- Leonid Solarević
- Svetomir Matić
- Josif Kostić
- Vladimir Cukavac
