= Jovan Petrović (general) =

Serbian army general (1843–1902)

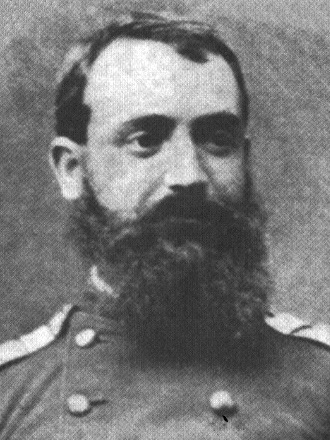
- Born: 16 June 1843; Sombor, Austrian Empire
- Died: 19 March 1902 (aged 58); Niš, Kingdom of Serbia
- Military career
- Rank: General

Jovan Petrović (Serbian Cyrillic: Јован Петровић; 16 June 1843 – 19 March 1902) was a Serbian general, Minister of Defence and Minister of Public Works of the Kingdom of Serbia. He also served as 10th Dean of the Academic Board of the Military Academy in Serbia from 1894 to 1897.

== Military Academy ==
Jovan Petrović was born on 16 June 1843 in Sombor, at the time in the Austrian Empire. His father Petar was the head of the workshop at the Military Technical Institute in Kragujevac. Jovan finished high school in Belgrade, then he finished four grades of Gymnasium in Kragujevac, and in Belgrade, he graduated from Velika škola. He then enrolled in the Military Academy in Belgrade in 1860. He graduated from the Academy in 1865, when he was promoted to the rank of lieutenant. During the incident at Čukur česma in 1862, he joined the freedom fighters at the barricades.

== War Academy in Berlin ==
After graduating from the Military Academy, he served in the Artillery Administration and the Topolivnica (Ordnance Foundry) in Kragujevac. For a time he was commander in the Military Crafts School until 1867. In 1868 he was a sergeant in the 3rd Field Brigade. From 1868 to 1872, he was promoted to a general staff officer of the Knjaževac People's Army. He was sent as a state cadet in 1872 to the Prussian Staff College, then called the Allgemeine Kriegsschule (War School). After three years of schooling, he graduated from the academy in Berlin in 1875. After that, he was an intern in the Guards Infantry regiment in Berlin. Upon his return to Serbia from 1875 to 1876, he served in the Ministre of Defence and was then the Chief of the Serbian General Staff.

== Serbian-Turkish Wars ==
In the First Serbian-Turkish War, he served in the Supreme Command. From 27 June to 18 August 1876, he was chief of staff of the Morava Army and took part in the Battle of Šumatovac, commanding a detachment of six battalions at Prugovac, on the left flank. The Turkish numerically superior division easily kept the six battalions suppressed, but when help arrived they achieved their goal of protecting the left flank. After that he became the Chief of Staff of the Morava-Timok Army of General Mikhail Chernyayev. Later, he became the commander of the Katun Army and the Chief of Staff of the 2nd Corps. After the peace, he received the customary "sword of surrender" from the Turkish commander at Aleksinac. In the Second Serbian-Turkish War, he was the Chief of Staff of the Morava Corps. During the liberation of Niš, he participated in the negotiations, when the Turks surrendered the city of Niš.

== Minister of Public Works and Defence ==
In the summer of 1879, he was an auxiliary member of the Serbian delegation in the International Commission for Determining the Border after the Serbian-Turkish Wars. In October 1879 he was appointed to the Serbian General Staff. From 1879 he taught the General Staff at the Military Academy, and from 1882 the history of wars and strategy. He was appointed commander of the 2nd Infantry Regiment in 1881. He was promoted to the rank of colonel by the General Staff in 1883. Politically he belonged to the Progressives and became a minister in several Progressive governments at the time. He was Minister of Construction in the Cabinet of Milan Piroćanac from 16 January 1883 to 3 October 1883. After that he was Minister of Defence in the governments of Nikola Hristić and Milutin Garašanin from 3 October 1883 to 6 December 1885. At the beginning of the Serbo-Bulgarian War, in addition to the duty of Minister of Defence, he served as Chief of Staff of the Supreme Command. Because he had no major war experience, he was viewed by the army to be unable to perform both the duties of Minister of War and Chief of Staff of the Supreme Command. He was also an honorary aide to King Milan Obrenović. After the defeat at the Battle of Slivnitsa, the king dismissed his duties as ill and incompetent. At his own request, he retired on 10 January 1886.

== Dean of the Military Academy ==
Reactivated in March 1894 and appointed the Dean of the Military Academy where he also taught war skills and strategy until 1897. In November 1897 he took his retirement again. Then in August 1900, he was reactivated all over again when he was promoted to the rank of general. From 1900 to 1901 he was commander of the Šumadija divisional area, and from 1901 until he died in 1902 he was commander of the Morava divisional area. He died in Niš on 1 April 1902.

== Literature ==
- Narodna enciklopedija srpsko-hrvatsko-slovenačka, Beograd, knjiga 3, 445
- Petar Opačić and Savo Škoko: "Serbian-Turkish Wars 1876-1878", BIGZ, Belgrade, 1981.
- Slobodan Đukić: "Foreign Influences on the Development of the Serbian Military Doctrine 1878-1918," doctoral dissertation, Belgrade, 2013.
- Milić Milićević and Ljubodrag Popović: Generali vojske Kneževine i Kraljevine Srbije, Vojnoizdavački zavod, Beograd, 2003.
- Slobodan Jovanović: "Vlada Milana Obrenovića," book 3, Belgrade, 1934.

== See also ==
- Cabinet of Milan Piroćanac
- Cabinet of Nikola Hristić II
- Military Academy (Serbia)
- Ministry of Defence (Serbia)
- František Zach
- Ranko Alimpić
- Milojko Lešjanin
- Ljubomir Ivanović (colonel)
- Jovan Andjelković (general)
- Stevan Zdravković (officer)
- Petar Topalović (officer)
- Dimitrije Đurić
- Milovan S. Pavlović
