= Nakučani =

Nakučani may refer to:

- Nakučani (Gornji Milanovac)
- Nakučani (Šabac)
