= Sultan Mahmud Mosque in Belgrade =

Mosque in Belgrade, Serbia

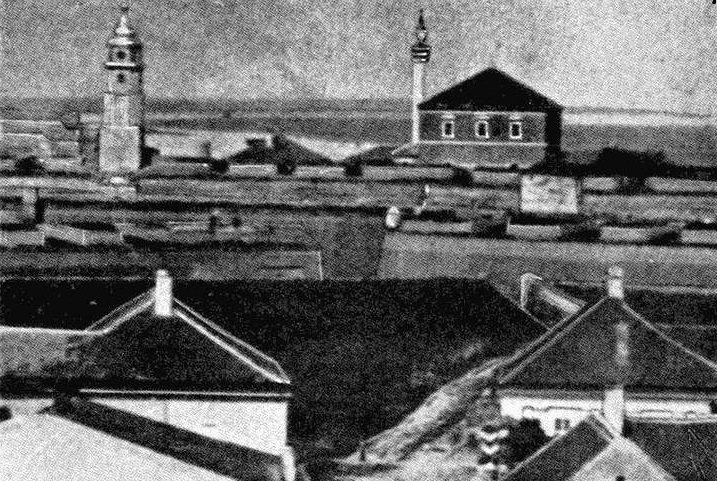

- Location within Belgrade

Religion
- Affiliation: Islam
- Status: Demolished

Location
- Location: Belgrade, Serbia
- Country: Serbia
- Coordinates: 44.811730°N 20.465958°E

Architecture
- Type: Mosque
- Style: Ottoman baroque
- Founder: Sultan Mahmud I
- Established: 1739
- Completed: ca. 1739, extended in 1746

Specifications
- Minaret: 1
- Materials: Stone, brick

Sultan Mahmud Mosque in Belgrade was a mosque in Belgrade, built around 1739 and expanded in 1746, located on the plateau of the Upper Town of the Belgrade Fortress. Nearby were the Damad Ali Pasha's tomb, a tekke, cemetery, the Vizier's residence, and even a tavern until the Russo-Turkish War (1768–1774), which was soon demolished in accordance with Sharia law.

== Background ==
Belgrade, which experienced almost two centuries of uninterrupted development as a medieval town, was transformed into an Oriental-style city during the Ottoman rule. The complex of public buildings, bazaars, and residential quarters (mahallas) formed the basis of Balkan-Oriental urban culture. Public buildings, such as mosques, were typically built on elevated locations so that the mosque and its minaret could dominate the surroundings.

Mosques built in Belgrade up until the 17th century followed the classical Constantinopolitan style. However, during the 18th and 19th centuries, the influence of Western styles led to the emergence of Turkish baroque in mosque architecture. Sultan Mahmud Mosque is an example of this, constructed around 1739 and expanded in 1746.

== History ==
The mosque was endowed by Sultan Mahmud I. It is unknown whether it was a conversion of an Austrian main guard building—suggested by its Western architectural appearance, apart from the minaret—or if it was newly built, reflecting the 18th-century Ottoman baroque style with Western elements.

After Serbia gained independence at the Congress of Berlin, the mosque was converted into a military hospital by the Principality of Serbia.

It was demolished in 1895 during a wave of national euphoria in the newly established Kingdom of Serbia, following the Serbian–Turkish Wars or Serbian Wars of Independence (1876–1878), which led to Serbia's internationally recognized independence.

Today, its foundations can still be seen in the grass on the right-hand side when entering the Upper Town beneath the Clock Tower.

== Architecture ==
The mosque was a two-story rectangular building made of stone, topped with a hipped roof. It featured single-story annexes on the southern and western façades, with arched porticos on the ground floor. Inside were a madrasa and a library, also endowed by Sultan Mahmud I (1730–1754), suggesting the presence of two entrances.

Originally, the library was located in the basement, but when the sultan learned that the books were being damaged by moisture, he ordered that they be moved upstairs and that a separate staircase be constructed to isolate the library from the main mosque.

According to a ferman (imperial decree), Sultan Mahmud refused to approve the expansion of the mosque, despite the fact that it could not accommodate all worshippers on Fridays and during Bayram.
