= Pavle Bošković =

Pavle Bošković (Ruma, Austrian Empire, 11 August 1849 - Belgrade, Kingdom of Serbs, Croats and Slovenes, 23 April 1923) was a Serbian Army general and the 12th Dean of the Academic Board of the Military Academy and its chief (1900-1901).

== Biography ==
Pavle Bošković was born on 11 August 1849 in Ruma. He graduated from high school in Belgrade in 1865 and in the same year he enrolled the Artillery School of the Military Academy in Belgrade as a cadet. In 1869 Bošković graduated from the Military Academy and immediately after that in January 1870 he was promoted to the rank of artillery lieutenant. Until 1872 he served as an NCO in a Field battery, and from 1872 to 1873 as an artillery inspection. In 1873 as a state cadet Bošković was sent to Prussia to take a course on how to improve in the quartermaster's service. Upon his return to Serbia in 1875. just before the start of the First Serbian-Turkish War he was on duty in the economic department of the Ministry of Defense.

== Quartermaster's Office ==
During both Serbian-Turkish wars, he became the assistant chief intendant. From 1879 he was an assistant chief of the economic department of the Ministry of Defense. He distinguished himself by his work on the reorganization of the army, so in cooperation with several other officers, the Law on the Military Academy was written in 1879, and a new Organization of the Army was published in 1883. From 1881 to 1882 he was the first commander of a battery, and then of a division, and in the middle of 1882 he was appointed a member of the artillery committee. He was promoted in 1882 to rank major. In 1883, he became the head of the uniform department of the Ministry of Defense. During Serbo-Bulgarian War he was appointed head of the quartermaster's department at the Supreme After the end of the war, he became the acting commander of the Danube Artillery Regiment in 1886. He was promoted to the rank of lieutenant colonel in 1887. He returned to the Central Military Administration in 1889, where he was first the head of the engineering and technical department. He was appointed head of the economic department in 1891 at the Ministry of Defense. He was promoted to the rank of colonel in 1893. He also served as a professor at the Military Academy on several occasions, from 1879 until 1881, from 1884 to 1887, from 1888 to 1889 and as its professor and dean from 1900 to 1901. He was appointed in 1897 as the headmaster of the Military Administrative School. He retired for the first time in 1898, but was reactivated in the summer of 1900.

== Supporter of Aleksandar Obrenović ==
Most officers opposed the upcoming marriage of king Aleksandar Obrenović and Draga Mašin in July 1900, so the king invited the officers to a meeting. At that meeting, the king told everyone of the invited officers that no one should interfere in his decision regarding who he'll choose to marry. The silence that ensued was broken by Pavle Bosković with the exclamation, "Long live the King!" And only then did several other officers join in the congratulations. After that, Pavle Bosković was promoted to rank of general. From 1900 to 1901 he served as the dean of the Military Academy. He retired for the second time in August 1901. After the May Coup he was one of the prominent counter-conspirators. He was a member of the "Society for the legal resolution of conspiracy issues", which was founded in October 1905. He had two sons, who died in 1914 and 1915. His daughter married to general Ljubomir Marić.

Pavle Bošković died on 23 April 1923 in Belgrade.
