= Svetomir Matić =

Yugoslav army general (1870–1931)

Svetomir Lj. Matić (Serbian Cyrillic: Светомир Љ. Матић; 24 November 1870 in Kraljevo, Principality of Serbia – 2 May 1931 in Novi Sad, Kingdom of Yugoslavia) was a Serbian and Royal Yugoslav Army general. He participated in the wars of 1912–1918. He also served as the 18th Dean of the Academic Board of the Military Academy in Serbia and its chief (1920–1921).

== Biography ==
Svetomir Matić was born into an officer's family. He finished elementary school and high school in Kragujevac. In 1887 he enrolled at the Artillery School of the Military Academy in Belgrade, from where he graduated in 1891, as well as at the Velika škola in 1896. For post-graduate studies in military science, he went to France. Upon his return, he was posted as a professor at the Military Academy.

For war merits in 1915 General Simović, the commander of Šumadija Second Division recommended Colonel Matić for the Order of Karađorđe's Star with swords, but later changed his mind on a minor technicality. But two years later at the Salonika front, Svetomir Matić, then commander of the Danube Division, was finally decorated with the Order of Karađorđe's star with swords.

From 1918, he was the inspector of the entire artillery section and chief of the Military Academy and also the commander of the Army District. In 1919 he was promoted to General.

He was appointed ban in 1930 of the Danube Banovina where he stayed in that position for a year.

Svetomir Matić died after a short and severe illness in Novi Sad and was buried in the family tomb at the Belgrade New Cemetery.

== See also ==
- Military Academy
- Danube Banovina
- František Zach
- Đura Horvatović
- Ranko Alimpić
- Milojko Lešjanin
