= Leonid Solarević =

Serbian military officer

General Leonid Solarević
- Serbian Cyrillic: Леонид Соларевић
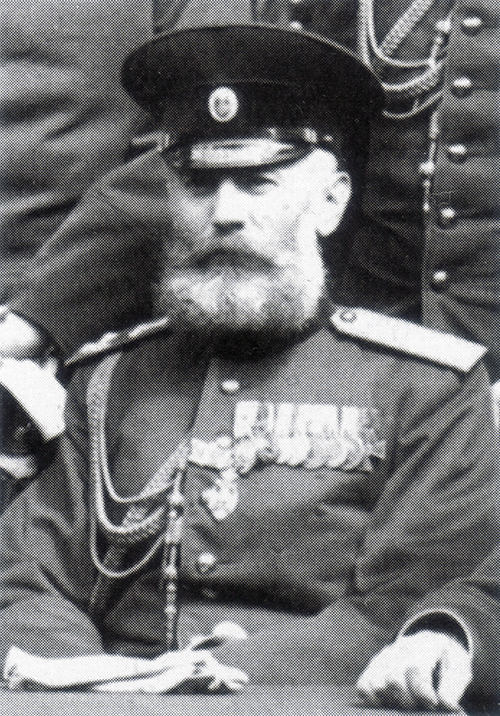
- Born: September 18, 1854; Belgrade, Principality of Serbia
- Died: April 20, 1929 (aged 74); Belgrade, Kingdom of Yugoslavia
- Spouse: Danica Kovačević
- Children: 5
- Military career
- Allegiance: Principality of Serbia; Kingdom of Serbia
- Branch: Armed forces of the Principality of Serbia; Royal Serbian Army
- Service years: 1869–1900; 1903–1910; 1914–1918
- Rank: General
- Conflicts: Serbian–Turkish Wars (1876–1878); Serbo-Bulgarian War; World War I
- Awards: Order of Karađorđe's Star; Order of the White Eagle; Order of the Cross of Takovo; Order of Miloš the Great
- Other work: Participant in the May Coup; Minister of Army; Chief of the Military Academy

Leonid Solarević (Serbian Cyrillic: Леонид Соларевић; 18 September 1854 – 20 April 1929) was a Serbian military officer. As a colonel of the Royal Serbian Army, he was one of the main participants in the May Coup of 1903 against King Alexander I of Serbia. He also served as the 14th Dean of the Academic Board of the Military Academy in Serbia and its chief from 1904 to 1907.

== Career ==
After a career in artillery, Solarević became aide-de-camp to King Alexander I in August 1893, and the main aide-de-camp in May 1898. Due to his opposition to the King's marriage to Draga Mašin, he was retired at his own request in July 1900. At the same time, he was relieved of his duties as an officer.

On the day of the May Coup (10–11 June [O.S. 28–29 May] 1903) Solarević was reactivated, with the rank of colonel he had before retiring. On the same day, he was appointed commander of the Danube Divisional Area, assuming command in place of murdered Colonel Dimitrije Nikolić, a firm loyalist to the King and the Obrenović dynasty.

Following the coup, Solarević served as the Minister of Army in 1903, Chief of the Military Academy in 1904–1907, and became a general in 1907. After that, he was retired twice – at his own request in 1910, and at the end of World War I in 1918 (as he was reactivated in 1914).

== Personal life ==
Solarević was married to Danica Kovačević, and had 5 children with her (3 sons and 2 daughters).

== Bibliography ==
- Милић Милићевић; Љубодраг Поповић (2003). Генерали Војске Кнежевнине и Краљевине Србије (in Serbian). Војноиздавачки завод. pp. 213–217. ISBN 978-86-335-0142-2.
- Бјелајац, Миле С. (2004). Генерали и адмирали Краљевине Југославије 1918—1941 (in Serbian). Институт за новију историју Србије, Београд. p. 271. ISBN 978-86-7005-039-6.

Political offices
Preceded by Jovan Atanacković	Minister of Army; 1903	Succeeded by Milan Andrejević
Military offices
Preceded by Laza Lazarević	Chief of the Military Academy; 1904–1907	Succeeded by Mihailo Živković
