= Jovan Petrović =

Jovan Petrović (Serbian: Јован Петровић) may refer to:

- Jovan Monasterlija (1660s–1706), Austrian officer and Commander of Serbian Militia
- Jovan Petrović-Kursula (1768–1813), Serbian revolutionary
- Jovan Petrović-Kovač (1772–1831), Serbian revolutionary
- Jovan Petrović (fl. 1932), designer of Zmaj aircraft
- Jovan Petrović (general) (1843–1902), Serbian minister of defence
