= Milivoj J. Nikolajević =

Serbian Army general (1861–1936)

Milivoje J. Nikolajević (Serbian: Миливојe Ј. Николајевић; 1861–1936) was a Serbian Army general, author and chief of the Military Academy. He served as the 19th Dean of the Academic Board of the academy from 1921 to 1924.

== Biography ==
Milivoj J. Nikolajević was born in 1861 in Belgrade, at the age of nineteen after graduating from secondary school (Gymnasium) he enrolled in the Artillery School of the Military Academy, graduating in 1883 when he officially became a member of the Serbian Army. He pursued his post-graduate military studies at the École superieure militaire of the Military Academy graduating in 1887. In his military career, he was, among other things, the commander (Maršal Dvora) of the Royal Guard, Adjutant to the King of Serbia, a professor at the École superieure militaire of the Military Academy, Chief of Staff of the Belgrade Defense in 1915, military envoy of the Kingdom of Serbia in London and Brussels, and chief of the Military Academy.

In 1896, he was appointed head of the Geographical Department, went through the First and Second Balkan War, and the First World War, after which he served his homeland as Marshal of the Court. His active service ended in 1929.

During the Great War, he was a Serbian military envoy to the British government in London where a "Serbian Relief Fund" was established, headed by Mr. and Mrs. Robert Seton-Watson and other benefactors. This association did an immeasurable service to Serbian refugees who arrived on the territory of the British Isles during the war years. The society accepted Serbian children and immediately sent them to school in Cambridge, Oxford, Winchester, Sherborne and London. All of these children, with very few exceptions, were supported at English expense and were allowed to continue and complete their schooling. This company also sent daily humanitarian shipments to prisoner-of-war camps where Serbian officers and soldiers were incarcerated in Germany, Austria-Hungary and Bulgaria.

== Works ==
- Severna Stara Srbija – Vojino Geografiska i Istorojska studija, Belgrade, 1892;
- Opšti deo Georgrafije Balkanskog poluostrova, Book 1, Belgrade, 1904;
- Geografija Balkanskoga poluostrova: Vojina geografija i istočne Rumelije, Book 2, Belgrade, 1904 Publisher: Štmparija D. Dimitrijevića).
- Srbija i njeni saveznici. Dogadjaji s jeseni 1915 godine was translated into French by the original author who spoke and wrote French fluently.
- La Serbie et ses alliés. Les événements de l'automne 1915, Belgrade, Publisher: Štamparija Saveza profesionalnih zanatilijskih udruženja, 1923);
- Za vreme svetstskog rata u Londonu was also translated by the original author who spoke and wrote French fluently;
- Pendant la Grande Guerre à Londre, Ratnik IV, 1933);

He also wrote textbooks on military science – geography and statistics – for students of the Class of 1894–1895 at the Military Academy in Belgrade.
