= Ljubomir Pokorni =

Serbian Army General

Ljubomir Pokorni (8 June 1872, in Nova Gradiška, Slavonia, Austria-Hungary – 1 December 1944, in Belgrade, Serbia, Yugoslavia) was a Serbian Army general who earlier in his career participating in the Macedonian Struggle, Balkan Wars and the Great War as a colonel. Between the First and Second World War, he was also an adjutant to both King Peter I and King Alexander I. He also served as the 20th Dean of the Academic Board of the Military Academy (1924–1927).

== Biography ==
Ljubomir Pokorni was born in 1872 in Nova Gradiška in Slavonia, then part of the Habsburg Empire. He completed his elementary schooling in his hometown before moving to Belgrade, Serbia. There he graduated from the Gymnasium and enrolled in the Artillery School of the Military Academy on 16 September 1889. Upon graduation, on 16 September 1892, he was promoted to lieutenant and from then on more promotion followed: in 1903 during the Struggle for Macedonia he received the rank of captain; during the Second Balkan War on 6 April 1913 he was promoted to the rank of colonel; and on 21 October 1918 (3 November 1918 Gregorian calendar) he was promoted to brigadier general. From 1919 to 20 April 1920 he was Adjutant to King Peter I. From 20 April to 8 September, he was unassigned and therefore decided to take his retirement. However, on 12 October 1922, he was recalled and assigned as Inspector of Economic Affairs until 9 July 1923. From July 1923 to 21 October 1923, he was promoted to Divisional General and from 14 February 1924 to 17 February 1927, he headed the Command of the Military Academy. He was sent to Paris as a Military Attaché from 17 February 1927 until 8 April 1927 when he became a member of the Military Council, then attached to the Ministry of the Army and Navy and on 11 April 1929 he was made Adjutant to King Alexander I of Yugoslavia.

In 1937, he wrote a military book entitled Duhovna veza izmedju vojske i naroda u savremenom rata.

== Awards and decorations ==
For his war merits, he was awarded twice the Order of the Karađorđe's Star with swords and the military ribbon of the order and many other medals.

== See also ==
- Military Academy
