= Cabinet of Nikola Hristić II =

- 2nd Cabinet of Kingdom of Serbia
- 1883–1884
- Coat of arms of Kingdom of Serbia
- Date formed: October 3, 1883
- Date dissolved: February 19, 1884

People and organisations
- Head of state: Milan I
- Head of government: Nikola Hristić

History
- Election: December 12, 1880
- Predecessor: Cabinet of Milan Piroćanac
- Successor: Cabinet of Milutin Garašanin

The Second Cabinet of Nikola Hristić was a cabinet of the Kingdom of Serbia from October 3, 1883 to February 19, 1884.

King Milan I was facing the Timok Rebellion, so he got Nikola Hristić out of retirement and installed him as the new Prime Minister and as the Minister of Internal Affairs. The Timok Rebellion was successfully crushed, and the leaders of it, most notably Nikola Pašić of the People's Radical Party, fled to Bulgaria. After the rebellion was crushed, new elections were held in early 1884, and a new cabinet was formed under Milutin Garašanin.

== Cabinet members ==
Position	Portfolio	Name	Image	In Office
Prime Minister	General Affairs	Nikola Hristić		Oct 3, 1883 – Feb 19, 1884
Minister	Internal Affairs	Nikola Hristić		Oct 3, 1883 – Feb 19, 1884
Minister	Foreign Affairs	Milan Bogićević		Oct 3, 1883 – Feb 19, 1884
Minister	Justice	Đorđe Pantelić		Oct 3, 1883 – Feb 19, 1884
Minister	Education and Church Affairs (Acting)	Đorđe Pantelić		Oct 3, 1883 – Feb 19, 1884
Minister	Finance	Aleksa Spasić		Oct 3, 1883 – Feb 19, 1884
Minister	People's Economy (Acting)	Aleksa Spasić		Oct 3, 1883 – Feb 19, 1884
Minister	Army	Jovan Petrović		Oct 3, 1883 – Feb 19, 1884
Minister	Construction	Kosta Protić		Oct 3, 1883 – Feb 19, 1884

== See also ==
- Nikola Hristić
- Cabinet of Serbia
