= Miroslav Talijan =

Serbian army general

- Мирослав Талијан
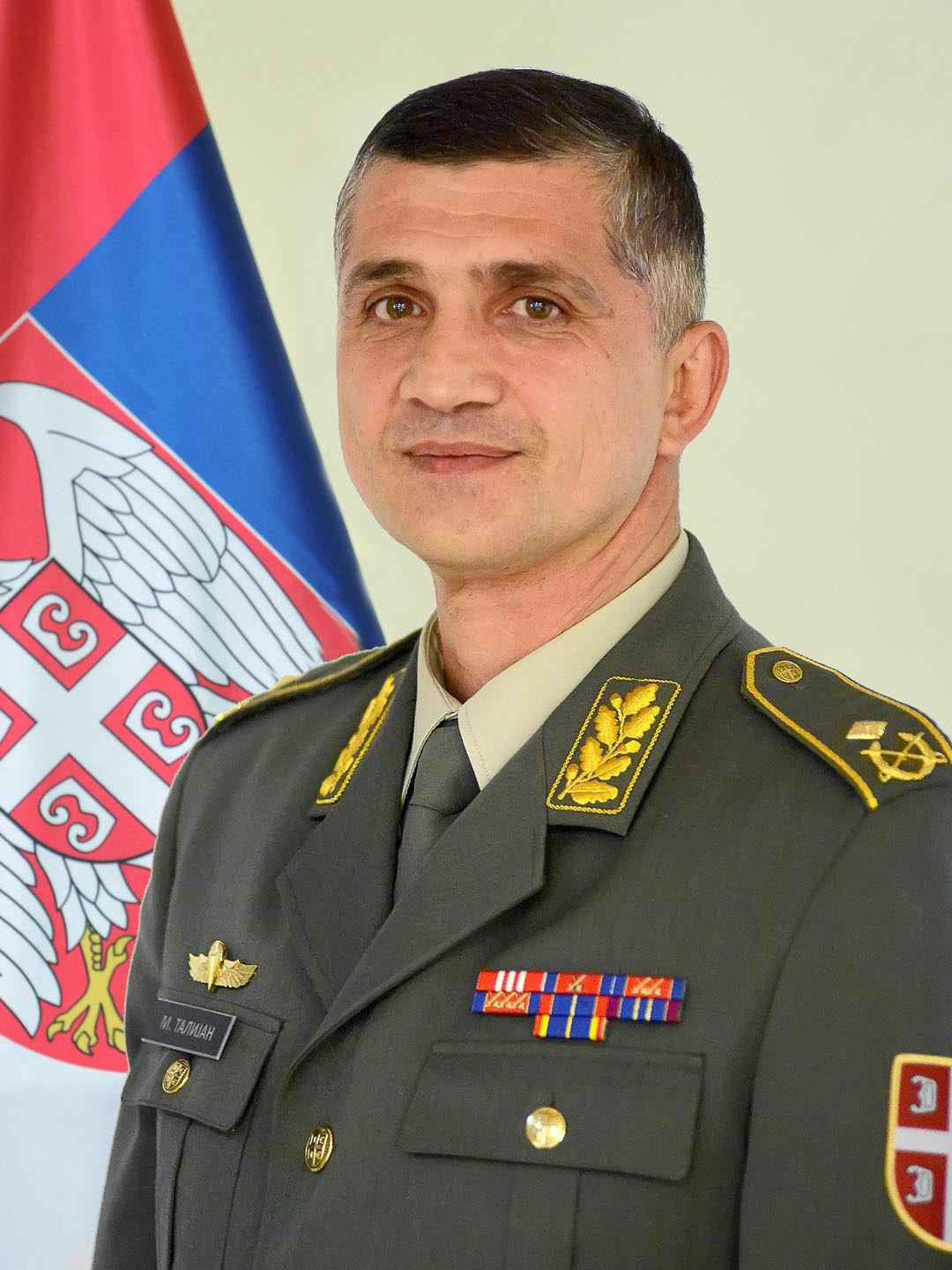
- Born: 10 August 1970 (age 56); Smederevska Palanka, SFR Yugoslavia
- Children: 5
- Military career
- Allegiance: Serbia
- Branch: Serbian Armed Forces; Serbian Land Forces
- Service years: 1993-present
- Rank: Brigadier General
- Unit: 72nd Brigade for Special Operations
- Conflicts: Kosovo War: NATO bombing of Yugoslavia

Miroslav Talijan (Serbian Cyrillic: Мирослав Талијан; born 10 August 1970 in Smederevska Palanka) is a brigadier general of the Serbian Army. He is the current commander of the 72nd Brigade for Special Operations and a former chief of the Military Academy.

He was the commander of the elite anti-terrorist Battalion "Sokolovi", then the deputy commander of the Cobras, and then focused on education, so he became one of the youngest doctor of sciences in the Serbian Armed Forces. Having fought in the Kosovo War, he is one of the few special forces members who took part in combat operations and managed to get a doctorate on the same topic.
