= Cabinet of Milan Piroćanac =

Political Organization

- 31st Cabinet of Principality of Serbia; 1st Cabinet of Kingdom of Serbia
- 1880–1883
- Coats of arms of Principality and Kingdom of Serbia
- Date formed: November 2, 1880
- Date dissolved: October 3, 1883

People and organisations
- Head of state: Milan I
- Head of government: Milan Piroćanac

History
- Elections: February 20, 1877; December 12, 1880
- Predecessor: Cabinet of Jovan Ristić III
- Successor: Cabinet of Nikola Hristić II

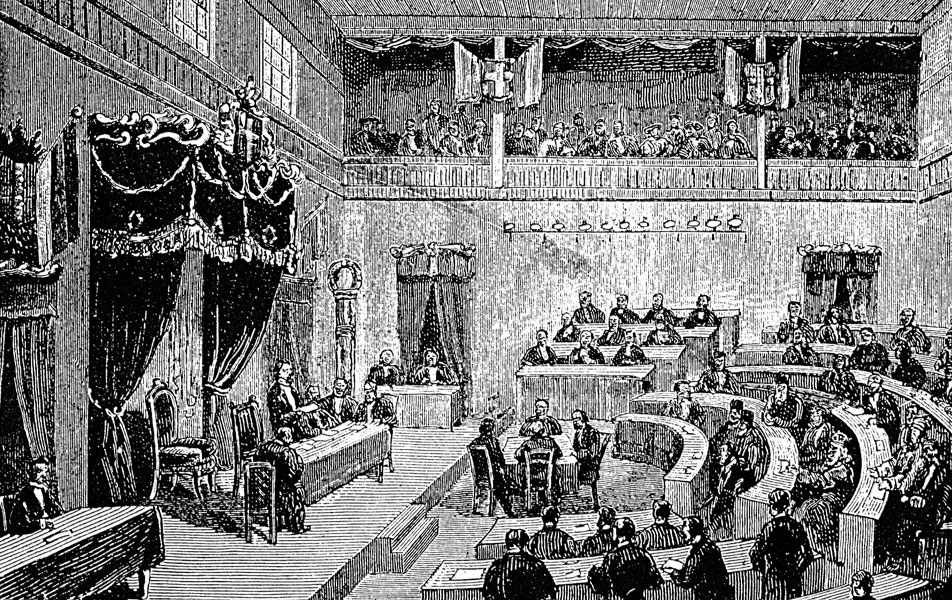
Proclamation of the Kingdom of Serbia in 1882.

The Cabinet of Milan Piroćanac was sworn in on November 2, 1880. It was marked by several important events in the history of Modern Serbia. In 1881, this Government decided to build a railroad through Serbia, in order to link Serbia with both Central Europe and Ottoman Turkey. The best financial terms were offered by a French company Union générale; however, it seemed that this company got a hold of this job by bribing senior officials. Also, this Cabinet saw a signing of the Secret Convention between Serbia and Austria-Hungary on June 28, 1881, that basically put Serbian foreign policy under Vienna's tutelage. On March 6, 1882, the Principality of Serbia was raised to the rank of Kingdom, with Prince Milan becoming King Milan I of Serbia. In 1883, this cabinet also witnessed the Timok Rebellion in Zaječar District, when the representatives of People's Radical Party rose up against this government.

== Cabinet members ==
Position	Portfolio	Name	Image	In Office
Prime Minister	General Affairs	Milan Piroćanac		Nov 2, 1880 - Oct 3, 1883
Minister	Justice	Milan Piroćanac		Nov 2, 1880 - Oct 22, 1881
Minister	Justice	Dimitrije G. Radović		Oct 22, 1881 - Oct 3, 1883
Minister	Internal Affairs	Milutin Garašanin		Nov 2, 1880 - Oct 3, 1883
Minister; *Acting until October 22	Finance	Čedomilj Mijatović		Nov 2, 1880 - Oct 22, 1881
Minister	Foreign Affairs	Čedomilj Mijatović		Nov 2, 1880 - Oct 22, 1881
Minister	Foreign Affairs	Milan Piroćanac		Oct 22, 1881 - Oct 3, 1883
Minister	Education and Church Affairs	Stojan Novaković		Nov 2, 1880 - Oct 3, 1883
Minister	Military	Milojko Lešjanin		Nov 2, 1880 - Feb 24, 1882
Minister	Military	Tihomilj Nikolić		Feb 24, 1882 - Oct 3, 1883
Minister	People's Economy	Jevrem P. Gudović		March 30, 1882 – Oct 3, 1883
Minister	Construction	Jevrem P. Gudović		Nov 2, 1880 - March 21, 1882
Minister; *Acting	Construction	Milutin Garašanin		March 21, 1882 – Jan 16, 1883
Minister	Construction	Jovan Petrović		Jan 16, 1883 - Oct 3, 1883

== See also ==
- Milan Piroćanac
- Cabinet of Serbia
