= Lazar D. Lazarević =

Serbian Army general

Lazar D. Lazarević (Serbian: Лазар Д. Лазаревић; Belgrade, Principality of Serbia, 5 March 1850 - Belgrade, Kingdom of Serbia, 27 July 1911) was a Serbian Army general and chief of the Corps Department Active Army Commands. He also served as the 13th Dean of the Academic Board of the Military Academy (1901–1904).

== Biography ==
After completing Gymnasium, Lazar D. Lazarević enrolled at the Artillery School of the Military Academy in Belgrade in October 1865, as a cadet. His classmates at the Military Academy at the time were future Serbian generals: Jovan Atanacković (1848–1921); Dimitrije Cincar-Marković (1849–1903); and Vasilije Mostić (1848–1901). After being promoted to cavalry lieutenant, he was sent for further education in Prussia, which then was normal practice for many officers of this school in order to modernize the Serbian army. As cavalry lieutenants, Lazarević and his classmate Dimitrije Cincar-Marković were sent for further training at the 13th Uhlan Regiment in Hanover.

In the First Serbian-Turkish War in 1876, he participated as a squadron commander, and in the war of 1877–1878, he was the commander of the Second Cavalry Regiment. From 1878 to 1882 he was the commander of the 1st Guards Squadron. From 1879 to 1881, he was also an ordinance officer to Milan Obrenović and later became his adjutant (1881–1885) and commander of the royal guard. In the Serbo-Bulgarian War of 1885, he commanded a cavalry regiment.

From 1885 to 1897 he was the commander of the cavalry of the permanent staff, and from 1897 to 1900 he was the chief of the Corps Department and Officer of the Cavalry Command of the Active Serbian Army.

The accession of the king Aleksandar Obrenović to the throne, Lazar D. Lazarević took part in missions that reported to European courts.

General Lazarević was the director of the Royal Military Academy in Belgrade from August 1901 to March 1904.

In addition to being the holder of the highest domestic decorations, he was also decorated with German, Russian, Bulgarian, English, Danish, Turkish, Romanian and Swedish orders.

At his request, he retired in 1905.

His granddaughter, Nadežda Lazarević, was the first female aeronautical engineer in post-war Yugoslavia.
