= Military Academy of the University of Defence =

Military academy in Belgrade, Serbia

- Војна академија Универзитета одбране
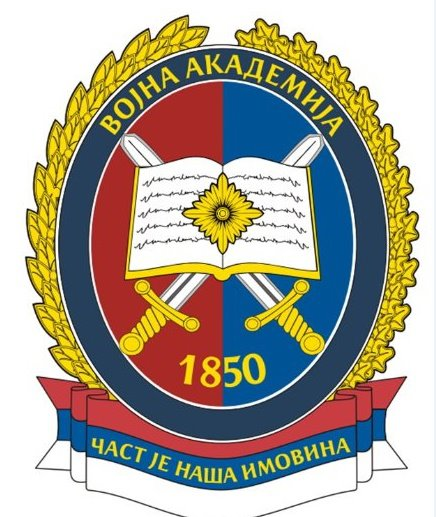
- Motto: Honor is our asset (Čast je naša imovina)
- Type: Military academy
- Established: 18 March 1850; 176 years ago
- Parent institution: University of Defence
- Rector: Brigadier general Boban Đorović
- Dean: Major general Željko Furundžić
- Location: Belgrade, Serbia
- Colors: Red and blue
- Website: Military Academy

The Military Academy of the University of Defence (Note: (Serbian: Војна академија Универзитета одбране, romanized: Vojna akademija Univerziteta odbrane)) is a military service academy of the Serbian Armed Forces located in Belgrade, Serbia. It is affiliated with the University of Defence. It conducts officer training program for officer cadets of the Armed Forces.

== Educational program ==
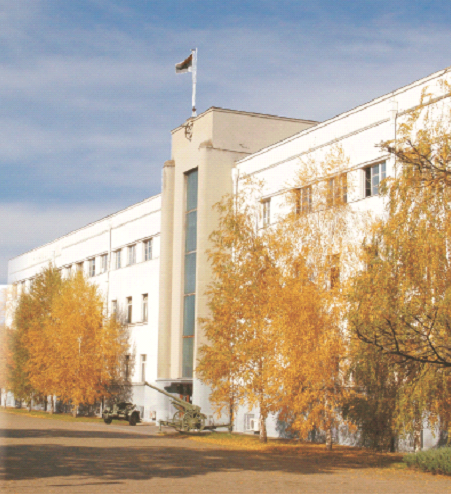
Military Academy main building

The following levels of studies are organized in the Military Academy:

- Undergraduate academic studies
- Postgraduate specialist studies
- Postgraduate master studies
- Postgraduate specialisations
- The Reserve Officers School
- Fundamental, applied and developing research important for raising of quality of degree-granting education, training of scientific and teaching staff and briefing students on scientific work

=== Undergraduate academic studies ===
A professional qualification, moral completeness and physical readiness are the basis for successful realization of tasks and command of units in positioned missions and tasks, continual development and improvement of officers.

The aim of the education at the Military Academy is the education of students for the vocation of professional officer, training for initial duties at the level of the commanding officer of platoon and preparations for intellectual and ethical challenges of officer vocation, in accordance with missions and tasks given to the Armed Forces.

There are six programs of studies at the Military Academy:

- Defense Management
- Military-Electronic Engineering
- Military-Mechanical Engineering
- Military-Chemical Engineering
- Military Aviation
- Logistics

The programs include courses that prepare students to serve as officers in the Armed Forces.

After graduation, students become managers (defense managers), mechanical engineers (engineers of military - mechanical engineering), engineers of electrical engineering and computer science (engineers of military - electronic engineering), engineers of technology (engineers of military - chemical engineering) and engineers of traffic and transportation (engineers of military aviation – pilots) by profession. After their graduation from the first degree academic studies, students go into professional military service at the rank of second-lieutenant or they can go on with their education at the master studies organized by the Military Academy.

To these students, alongside attendance of compulsory lectures, it is also possible to acquire internationally accepted certificates: STANAG (knowledge of foreign languages) and ECDL (computer skills).

The teaching process at the Military Academy consists of active classes (lectures, exercises, and other forms of teaching) and special forms of teaching (such as camps, military training, training in winter conditions – skiing, training for steering a motor vehicle, flight training, and embarking on the ships of river units). The teaching process is organized by the teachers from the Military Academy, as well as professors from other faculties, associates from scientific institutions, the Ministry of Defense and the general staff of the Armed Forces. Emphasis is placed on the practical implementation of knowledge and skills which students acquire through lectures and exercises.

Teaching is organized in the contemporary equipped laboratories, cabinets, classrooms equipped with computers and Internet. The library and reading-rooms, with numerous publications of scientific-educational literature and fiction and the possibility of using the newest publications of technical journals, are at students' disposal. All programs which are organized at the Military Academy are in a complete accordance with the programs of studies which are organized at military academies in Europe.

Regardless of program taken and diplomas, cadets are commissioned second lieutenants or ensigns in the Armed Forces upon graduation.

==== Defence Management ====
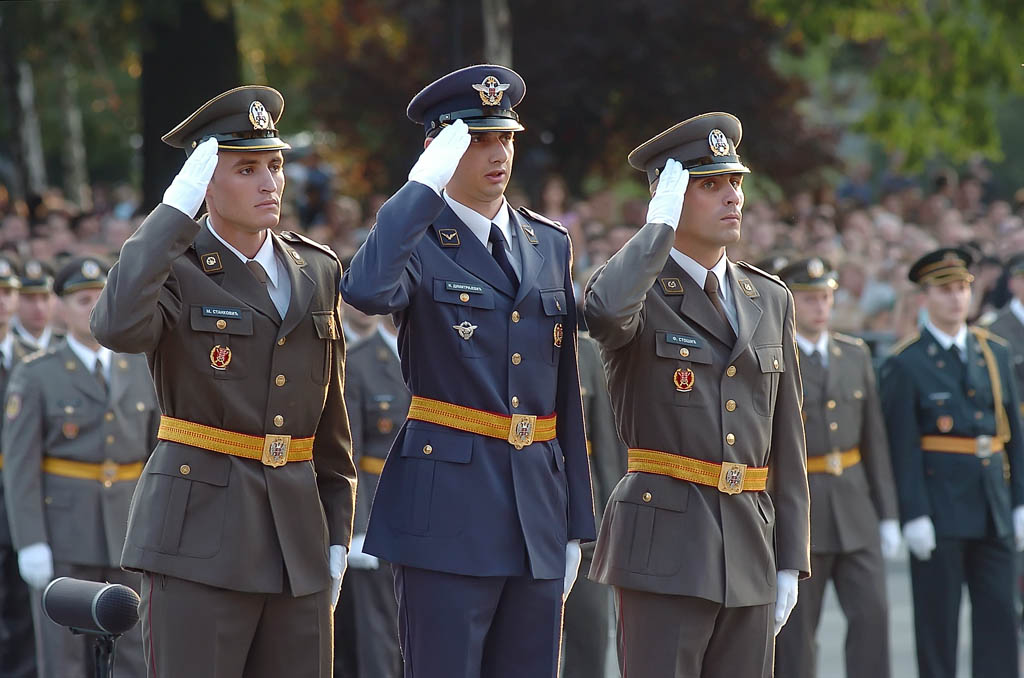
Cadets at the graduation ceremony

The aim of this program of studies is the adoption of academic knowledge and skills, and achieving competencies necessary to carry out initial branch – service officer duties, a platoon leader in accordance with the missions and tasks of Serbian Armed Forces, as well as for carrying out managerial duties in the defense system. The program includes areas that are necessary for acquiring defense management system basic theoretical knowledge, such as management, economic and organizational sciences. The elected modules are:

- Infantry
- Armored Units
- Artillery
- Engineers
- River Units
- Anti-aircraft Defense Units
- Air Surveillance and Reporting

The cadet is awarded a Defense Management diploma.

==== Military-Mechanical Engineering ====
Military - Mechanical Engineering is the Military Academy cadets' education for technical service officer core and mechanical engineering. Realization of this study program, enables future officers – mechanical engineers to resolve fundamental technical-technological problems in their initial command or staff duties that are in connection with maintenance and storage of arms and military equipment. The elected modules are:

- Weaponry and armament
- Combat vehicles

The cadet is awarded a Mechanical Engineering Diploma and Diploma's Supplement which means competencies of officers technical for technical service (Weaponry and Armament specialty or Combat Vehicles).

==== Military-Electronic Engineering ====
Military - Electronic Engineering is designed for the education of cadets from the Military Academy for telecommunication and technical services officer core and computer science. Realization of this study program, enables future officers of telecommunications, technical services and computer sciences to resolve fundamental technical-technological problems in their initial duties, which are in connection with exploitation and maintenance of military electronic systems and means in its service and specialty. The elected modules are:

- Telecommunications
- Radar Systems
- Rocket and Fire Control Systems
- Information Systems

The cadet is awarded an Electronic Engineering Diploma. Except for diplomas, a cadet is awarded and a Diploma's Supplement, which determines cadet competencies for professional officer service in telecommunications, technical service (radar systems and missile systems specialty and fire control system) and Informatics.

==== Military-Chemical Engineering ====
Military - Chemical Engineering is the Military Academy cadets' education for technical branches of officer core, ordnance specialty and anti CBRN specialty, as well as technology engineers. Future officers - Military Chemical Engineers, depending on elected module, will be enabled to resolve fundamental technical-technological problems in their initial duties in the services and specialties, primarily to the platoon level, which are in connection with: Tech maintenance and ordnance storage, and technology of CBRN accidents sanitation in peace and war. The elected modules are:

- Ordnance specialty
- CBRN branch

The cadet is awarded a Chemical Engineering Diploma and Diploma's Supplement which determines officer competencies for technical service professional officer (Ordnance specialty) and CBRN branch.

==== Military Aviation ====
Military Aviation is the Military Academy cadets' education for Air Force officers – aircraft and helicopter pilots as well as air traffic engineers. Realization of this study program enables future Air Force officers - aircraft and helicopter pilots, to work on their initial duties of pilots in air detachments, then to carry out basic flying duties, as well as for the continued advanced air squadron level training. In addition, study program provides necessary competencies for performing the duties of an engineer in military aviation.

The cadet is awarded an Air Traffic Engineer Diploma and Diploma's Supplement which determines officer competencies for professional Air Force pilot.

==== Logistics ====
Defence Logistics is to acquire academic knowledge and skills, and achieving competencies necessary to carry out initial duties of logistics officers in the defence system. Core courses of the program include courses of mathematics, social science, defence science, certain fields of technical-technological sciences and defense logistics.

The structure of the program includes theoretical knowledge required for successful defence logistics management (basic economics, microeconomics, logistics, organization, quality assurance, special logistic areas, military management, crisis management, resource management, financial business, material business, supply material management and electronic business). The elected modules are:

- Basic Logistics
- Supply Management
- Finance Management
- Transportation
- Maintenance

The cadet is awarded a Defence Logistics Manager Diploma and Diploma's Supplement which determines the cadet's competencies for professional officer in the service of the Armed Forces.

=== Master studies ===
Master studies enable the cadet to expand the knowledge acquired at the graduate academic studies and to acquire the competence in fulfilling higher duties in a branch – service, as well as to perform the job of a graduate manager, i.e. a graduate engineer.

The studies last one year or two semesters during which the cadet obtains 60 ESPB.

After a successful graduation, a cadet is a graduate defense manager or a graduate engineer of a certain profile. Thus, the cadet will have gained all necessary conditions for reaching a better position in a profession and specialized training.

Master studies are carried out through four programs of studies:

- Defense Management
- Military - Mechanical Engineering
- Military - Electronic Engineering
- Military - Chemical Engineering

=== Specialization ===
After the first degree studies and during the military career, officers can enrol academic and professional postgraduate training.

To officers, chosen by contest, along with parallel work in the units, the specialized training which represents a type of postgraduate education is enabled, and it can be done on specialized, master and doctoral studies.

National Defense School offers command and general-staff officer education for the highest duties in the Armed Forces and the Ministry of Defense.

The forms of specialised training at the Military Academy are:

- General-staff specialised training
- Command specialised training

== Campus ==
The campus of the Academy is located at Banjica neighborhood in Belgrade. Besides main lecture buildings and cadet dormitory, on campus-facilities include stadium, indoor swimming pool, indoor athletics hall as well.

== Chiefs ==
No.	Portrait	Name	Term of office	Military
Principality of Serbia
1		František Zach	1850–1859	Armed Forces of the Principality of Serbia
2		Ranko Alimpić	1859–1860	Armed Forces of the Principality of Serbia
(1)		František Zach	1860–1865	Armed Forces of the Principality of Serbia
3		Milojko Lešjanin	1865–1868	Armed Forces of the Principality of Serbia
(1)		František Zach	1868–1874	Armed Forces of the Principality of Serbia
(3)		Milojko Lešjanin	1874–1875	Armed Forces of the Principality of Serbia
4		Ljubomir Ivanović	1875–1879	Armed Forces of the Principality of Serbia
5		Jovan Andjelković	1879	Armed Forces of the Principality of Serbia
6		Stevan Zdravković	1879–1880	Armed Forces of the Principality of Serbia
(3)		Milojko Lešjanin	1880	Armed Forces of the Principality of Serbia
(6)		Stevan Zdravković	1880–1882	Armed Forces of the Principality of Serbia
Kingdom of Serbia
(6)		Stevan Zdravković	1882–1886	Royal Serbian Army
7		Petar Topalović	1886	Royal Serbian Army
(6)		Stevan Zdravković	1886–1887	Royal Serbian Army
8		Dimitrije Đurić	1887–1889	Royal Serbian Army
(7)		Petar Topalović	1889–1891	Royal Serbian Army
(8)		Dimitrije Đurić	1891–1893	Royal Serbian Army
9		Stevan Pantelić	1893–1894	Royal Serbian Army
10		Jovan Petrović	1894–1897	Royal Serbian Army
11		Milovan Pavlović	1897–1900	Royal Serbian Army
12		Pavle Bošković	1900–1901	Royal Serbian Army
13		Laza Lazarević	1901–1904	Royal Serbian Army
14		Leonid Solarević	1904–1907	Royal Serbian Army
15		Mihailo Živković	1907–1912	Royal Serbian Army
16		Mihailo Rašić	1912–1914	Royal Serbian Army
Kingdom of Yugoslavia
17		Živko Pavlović	1919–1920	Royal Yugoslav Army
18		Svetomir Matić	1920–1921	Royal Yugoslav Army
19		Milivoj J. Nikolajević	1921–1924	Royal Yugoslav Army
20		Ljubomir Pokorni	1924–1927	Royal Yugoslav Army
21		Josif Kostić	1927–1930	Royal Yugoslav Army
22		Sava Tripković	1930–1936	Royal Yugoslav Army
23		Vladimir Cukavac	1936–1940	Royal Yugoslav Army
24		Marko Mihailović	1940–1941	Royal Yugoslav Army
25		Uroš Tešanović	1941	Royal Yugoslav Army
SFR Yugoslavia
26		Savo Orović	1944–1947	Yugoslav People's Army
27		Ratko Martinović	1947–1950	Yugoslav People's Army
28		Dušan Vignjević	1950–1952	Yugoslav People's Army
29		Milorad Janković	1952–1953	Yugoslav People's Army
30		Milan Šakić	1953–1956	Yugoslav People's Army
31		Franjo Herljević	1956–1962	Yugoslav People's Army
32		Đuro Dulić	1962–1967	Yugoslav People's Army
33		Bogdan Mamula	1967–1973	Yugoslav People's Army
34		Radislav Klanjšček	1973–1975	Yugoslav People's Army
35		Ilija Rašković	1975–1979	Yugoslav People's Army
36		Stojan Asprovski	1979–1980	Yugoslav People's Army
37		Slavoljub Đokić	1980–1983	Yugoslav People's Army
38		Pavle Strugar	1983–1987	Yugoslav People's Army
39		Mato Pehar	1987–1991	Yugoslav People's Army
40		Veljko Drobac	1991–1992	Yugoslav People's Army
Serbia and Montenegro
41		Momčilo Lazović	1992–1994	Armed Forces of Serbia and Montenegro
42		Tripko Čečović	1994–1995	Armed Forces of Serbia and Montenegro
43		Milan Karajović	1995–2000	Armed Forces of Serbia and Montenegro
44		Momčilo Momčilović	2000–2002	Armed Forces of Serbia and Montenegro
45		Ljubiša Stojimirović	2002–2003	Armed Forces of Serbia and Montenegro
46		Dragan Vojinović	2003–2005	Armed Forces of Serbia and Montenegro
47		Vidosav Kovačević	2005–2006	Armed Forces of Serbia and Montenegro
Republic of Serbia
(47)		Vidosav Kovačević	2006–2009	Serbian Armed Forces
48		Mladen Vuruna	2009–2014	Serbian Armed Forces
49		Goran Zeković	2014–2018	Serbian Armed Forces
50		Miroslav Talijan	2018	Serbian Armed Forces
51		Bojan Zrnić	2018–2021	Serbian Armed Forces
52		Srđan Blagojević	2021–2026	Serbian Armed Forces
53		Željko Furundžić	2026–present	Serbian Armed Forces

== In popular culture ==
The campus of the Military Academy was a center point of the popular television series Military Academy broadcast on Radio Television of Serbia (RTS) from 2012 to 2017, and two movies, Military Academy 2 (2013) and Military Academy 3: New Beginning (2016). It was produced in cooperation with Serbian Armed Forces and the Ministry of Defence.
