= Uroš Tešanović =

Uroš M. Tešanović (Serbian: Урош М. Тешановић; Bosanska Krupa, Ottoman Empire, 31 January 1891 - Farlar, Coesfeld, then West Germany, 18 December 1965) was a Serbian officer and divisional general of the Royal Yugoslav Army during the April War in 1941 when Nazi Germany attacked and invaded the Kingdom of Yugoslavia. Before that, he served as the 25th Dean of the Academic Board the Military Academy where he also taught and authored military textbooks.

== Biography ==
He was born on 31 January 1891 in Bosanska Krupa to father Mića, a merchant and mother Mileva. He had a brother, Boško, who was an engineer. Uroš Tešanović finished elementary school in his hometown and high school in Sarajevo. Being an Austro-Hungarian citizen at the time, he secretly left and went to live in Belgrade, then Kingdom of Serbia. In 1907 he enrolled at the Military Academy as a cadet. He finished at the top of his class.

== Active service ==
After completing his schooling, he was promoted to artillery lieutenant on 1 September 1911. A month later, he was assigned to the Danube Field Artillery Regiment. In the First Balkan War he held the same rank of Lieutenant as in the Second Balkan War. World War I found him in the position of commander of the second battery of the first division in the Danube Artillery Regiment part of the First Army under the command of general Petar Bojović and general Živojin Mišić. After the end of the Battle of Kolubara on 28 February 1915 he was promoted to the rank of artillery Captain (second class) and transferred to the commander of a battery as an aid to the Montenegrin Army. He held the same rank at the Battle of Mojkovac during the retreat towards Shkodra. In Shkodra he was captured on 9 January 1916 and taken to the Grednig camp where he remained until before the end of the First World War.

He was released from the camp on 16 October 1918 and joined the Supreme Command of the Serbian Army. There he was assigned to the new duty of the commander of the howitzer battery. On 30. April 1919, he was appointed professor of artillery at the Maritime Academy in Sisak. He was promoted to the rank of artillery Captain of the first class on 1 December 1919 and was assigned to the new duty of the commander of the second artillery battery of the second division in the heavy artillery regiment of the Fourth Army District based in Maribor, Slovenia. On 21 June 1920, he was sent to the delimitation delegation from Hungary to Budapest, where he remained in the same rank until he returned from abroad. From 1 December 1920, he was at the Artillery School of the Military Academy (22nd class) where he successfully completed his courses on 1 October 1922 and was promoted to artillery major on 8 October 1920. He was then assigned to serve in the Operations Department of the General Staff. During that period, he was appointed and sent to prepare for the General Staff profession. During his training, he was promoted to the rank of artillery lieutenant colonel and on 6 January 1925, transferred to the General Staff with the same rank. On 4 April 1925 he was appointed acting and then chief of staff of the Vrbas divisional area with headquarters in Banja Luka. On 20 November 1928 was sent on a six-month leave of absence to France to study military tactics at the St. Cyr Military Academy. Upon his return on 14 April 1928, he was appointed Chief of Staff of the Bregalnica Divisional Area with headquarters in Štip. On 13 June 1929 he was assigned to the post of military attaché in Prague.

While in Prague He was promoted to the rank of artillery Colonel on 15 August 1929 and as a military envoy, he spent two years there. Upon his return to Serbia on 26 July 1931, he was deployed as Chief of Staff of the Bosnian Divisional Area based in Sarajevo. He was appointed commander of the infantry regiment in Boka Kotorska on 2 July 1934. He was a clerk of the Military Council and a part-time professor at the Military Academy from 20 May 1935 to 7 July of the same year. After this duty, he was appointed acting and then Chief of Staff of the Third Army District, based in Skopje and in that position on 2 April 1937, he was promoted to the rank of General Staff Brigadier General. He was transferred on 3 November 1938, as an assistant director of the Military Academy and a permanent professor there. On the king's birthday (Peter II on 6 September 1939 he was the recipient of the Order of the Yugoslav Crown of the third Class and on 31 October he was appointed commander of the Šumadija divisional area based in Kragujevac. On 11 December 1940, he returned to the post of assistant manager of the Military Academy. He was promoted to the rank of Divisional General on 2 April 1941. With the departure of the divisional general Marko Mihailović to the duty of the commander of the Drina division on 6 April 1941, he became the warden of the Military Academy in Belgrade. The April War caught him in that position and he remained there until the capitulation of the Yugoslav Army on 18 April 1941.

== Captivity and remaining in exile ==
He was captured by members of the Wehrmacht on 24 April 1941 in Belgrade and interned in the prisoner-of-war camps in Nazi Germany. He spent most of his time in Nuremberg and Osnabrück along with the 215 Yugoslav generals and admirals captured out of 240. In mid- or late-1942, in the Nuremberg camp Oflag XIII-B , Oflag IV-C and Landwasser an association called "Community for cultural and physical training" was formed and General Tešanović was elected its president. In that role on 18 March 1943 he was forced to sign a letter rejecting The Hague and the Geneva Convention on the grounds that all established rules of conduct were invalid since they were broken Though he and other Serbian officers knew that the Nazi regime's days were numbered, however, all POWs vowed not to return to their homeland when the war ends unless Yugoslavia was freed of totalitarianism. This committee was subliminally influenced and forced to publicly renounce (and not without regret) the Government of the Kingdom of Yugoslavia in Exile and Anti-Hitler Coalition and adhered to the positions of Nazi Germany. The basic program of this association was the fight against CPY in Yugoslavia and nothing else. Also, this association was not looked favourably in the camp by the warden if it was suspected that individual officers were agitating for Yugoslavia (the government in London) or the CPY in the homeland. At the beginning of 1943, Tešanović handed over the functioning of his board and united with the Army General Dimitrije Živković who became the head of the Oflag IV-C camp in Osnabrück.

After the surrender of Nazi Germany and the beginning of Allied Occupation of Germany, Tešanović, along with many soldiers who fought for the Nazis, refused to be repatriated to his home countries, fearing retribution from the USSR. Due to his refusal, General Tešanović was, along with numerous other officers, put on the "blacklist" by the government of Democratic Federal Yugoslavia on 7 August 1945, and included in the citizens of the Kingdom of Yugoslavia who were invalidated and deprived of citizenship of their native homeland. At the end of 1945, Tešanović was elected a member of the Staff of the Yugoslav Royal Army in Voerde and commander of the Third Center, and from 1946, he was the commander of the same center under the General Directorate of the Yugoslav DP camps in the British occupation zone. After the disbandment of the camp system in 1948, Tešanović settled with a group of 60 Serbian generals at Farlar Castle near Coesfeld. There he spent the last decades of his life. He died on 18 December 1965 of a heart attack. Uroš Tešanović was buried on 22 December at the Serbian Military Cemetery in Osnabrück.

== Family ==
He got married in 1919 to Nadežda, the daughter of Petar Milenković, lawyer and secretary of the Court of Cassation in Belgrade. They had two daughters, Jovanka, who was a doctor, and Ljubica, an associate in the Royal SANU.
