= Josif Kostić =

Serbian politician, army general (1877–1960)

Minister of Postal and Telegraph Affairs of the Government of National Salvation
- In office 29 August 1941 – 4 October 1944
- Preceded by: None
- Succeeded by: Office abolished

Personal details
- Born: 13 August 1877 Leskovac, Principality of Serbia
- Died: 1960 (aged 82–83) Switzerland
- Profession: Politician

Josif Kostić (13 August 1877 – 1960) was a Serbian politician and army general and one of the most prominent officers of the secret military organization, the White Hand prior to and during World War II. He also served as the 21st Dean of the Academic Board of the Military Academy in Serbia and its chief in 1927–1930.

In 1912 Kostić joined the White Hand, fought in World War I, and in 1930 he was promoted to Army General. He was a staunch monarchist, and in World War II collaborated with the Nazis and was appointed as Minister of Postal and Telegraph Affairs of the Reich controlled Government of National Salvation. In 1944, when the government fell to the communist Yugoslav and Soviet forces, Kostić and several other ministers and collaborators fled to Vienna, and he eventually settled in Switzerland, where he died in 1960.
