= Nakučani (Gornji Milanovac) =

Nakučani Накучани
- Village
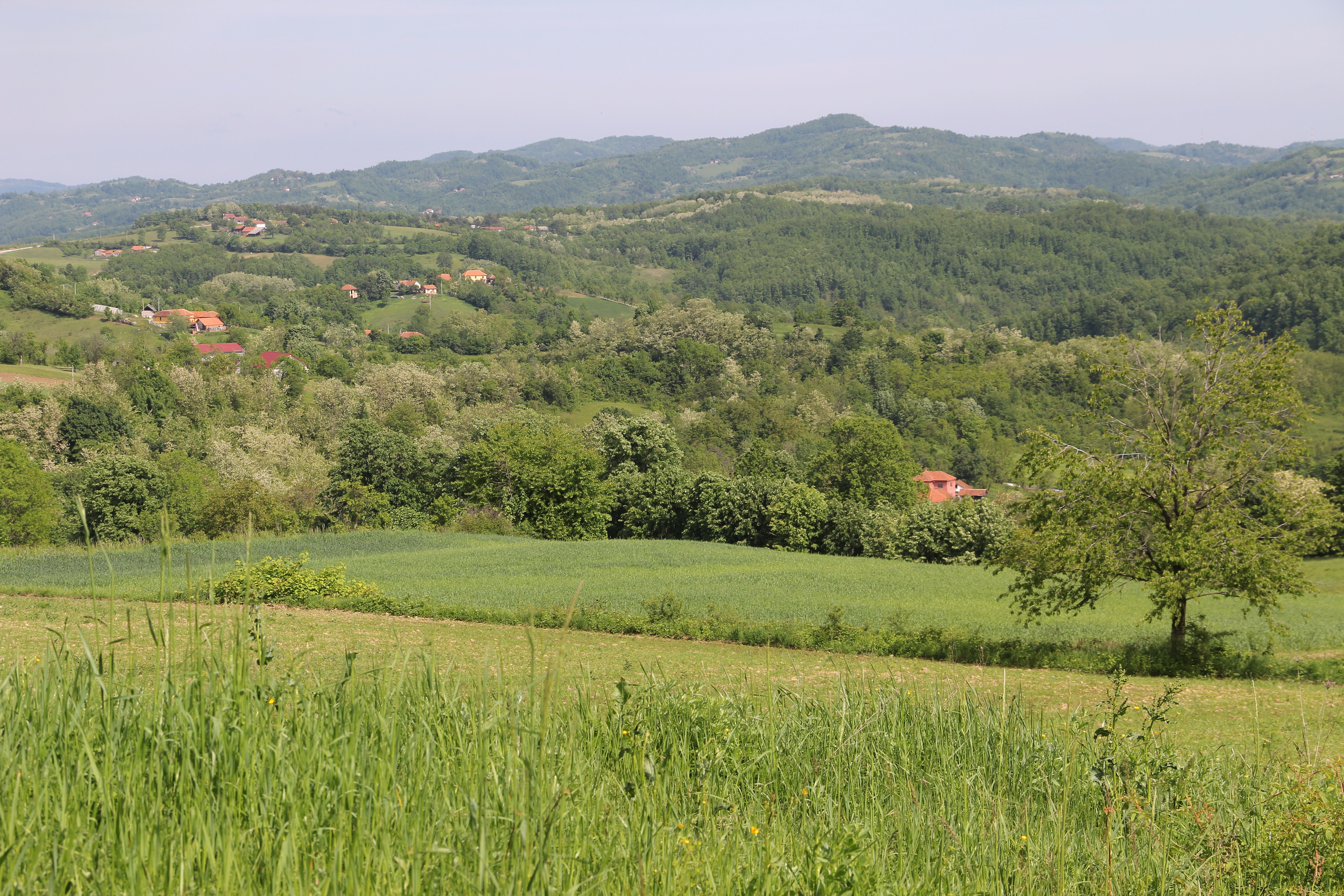
- Nakučani, municipality of Gornji Milanovac, Serbia

- Location within Serbia
- Coordinates: 44°05′17″N 20°23′09″E
- Country: Serbia
- District: Moravica District
- Municipality: Gornji Milanovac

Population (2002)
  - Total: 123
- Time zone: UTC+1 (CET)
  - Summer (DST): UTC+2 (CEST)

Nakučani is a village in the municipality of Gornji Milanovac, Serbia. According to the 2002 census, the village has a population of 123 people.

The village was active in the Serbian Revolution, being organized into the knežina (administrative unit) of Brusnica (Takovo) during the First Serbian Uprising (1804–13). Among notable local revolutionaries were Pavle Todorović and Stevan Lazarević.
