= František Zach =

Czech and Serbian general (1807–1892)

General František Aleksandr Zach
- Франтишек Александр Зах
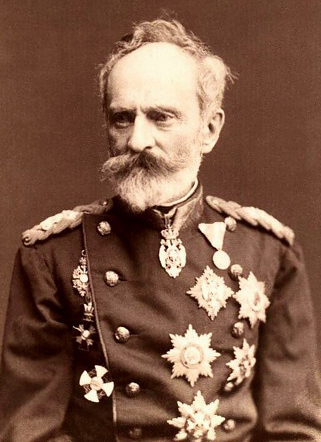
- Zach in 1877
- Born: 1 May 1807; Olomouc, Moravia, Austrian Empire
- Died: 14 January 1892 (aged 84); Brno, Moravia, Austria-Hungary
- Military career
- Allegiance: Principality of Serbia
- Branch: Serbian Army
- Service years: 1850–1883
- Rank: General
- Nickname: Franja
- Commands: Ibar Army
- Conflicts: Serbo-Turkish War
- Awards: Order of the White Eagle; Order of the Cross of Takovo

František Zach (Czech pronunciation: [ˈfrancɪʃɛk ˈzax]; Serbian: Франтишек Зах/František Zah; 1 May 1807 – 14 January 1892), also known as Franjo Zah (Фрањо Зах), was a Czech and Serbian military leader and military theorist. He is best known for his service to the Principality of Serbia, being the first acting General and Chief of the Serbian General Staff from 1876 to 1877.

Zach was known for being a flamboyant freedom fighter and Pan-Slavist, fighting in both the November uprising in Poland of 1830, as well as in Serbia during the latter half of the 19th century. He played a vital role in the formation of the Načertanije in 1844, which later served as a guideline for the unification of Serbs divided by Ottoman and Austro-Hungarian rule. He was also the first Dean of the Academic Board of the Military Academy in Serbia and its chief from 1850 to 1859; 1860–1865; and 1868–1874.

== Biography ==
František Alexander Zach was born on 19 April 1807 in Olomouc, Moravia, Austrian Empire (now the Czech Republic). His father was a landlord, who soon after his birth inherited the roadside tavern "At the Black Eagle" in Brno. He finished gymnasium in Brno in 1824, and the Faculty of Law at the University of Vienna, then worked as a clerk in numerous locations across Moravia.

He participated in the failed 1830–31 rebellion in Russian Poland. He then emigrated, first to France in 1832 where he studied military theory, then joined the circle of Polish magnate Adam Czartoryski. As Czartoryski's trusted man, he was sent in late 1843 to Belgrade, the capital of the Principality of Serbia, he entered the elite, befriending influential statesman Ilija Garašanin.

Zach participated in the 1848 Slavic Congress as a member of the Czech-Slovak delegation. Upon returning to Belgrade in 1849, Zach founded the Belgrade artillery school where he became its headmaster and teacher, he worked there from 1850 to 1860. The school later became the Belgrade Military Academy. Zach was also the founder of the Serbian arsenal in Kragujevac, Zastava Arms.

Later on, he became the military advisor for prince Milan Obrenović, who in 1876 gave Zach the commission of Chief of the General Staff. Zach was the first Serbian general to have a full military commission, and the first Czech ever to reach such a high commission while serving abroad. He was heavily wounded and lost his leg in 1876 while leading the Ibar Army in an engagement with a Turkish force under Mehmed Ali Pasha, he was replaced by Colonel Ilija Čolak-Antić. General Ranko Alimpić and General Milojko Lešjanin commanded the Drina Army and Timok Army, respectively. He signed the ratification of the Greek–Serbian Alliance in November 1868. He retired in 1883.

Zach died in Brno in 1892 after retiring from a long military career and being disappointed with politics. A street in Brno, as well as in Belgrade was named after him in his honour. In his native Olomouc, there is a museum dedicated to him.

He was awarded the Order of the White Eagle and a number of other decorations from various countries.

== Military ranks ==
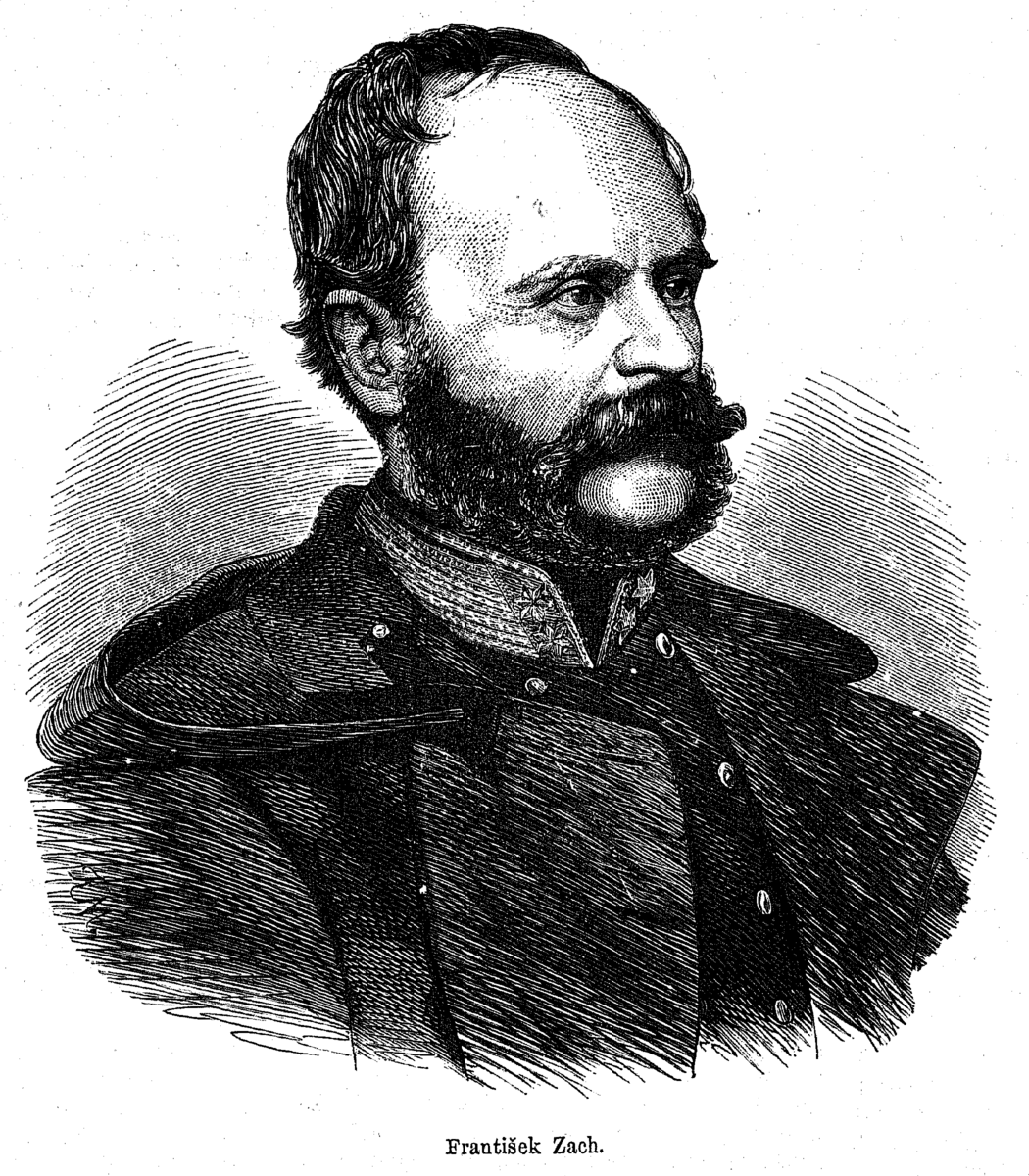
František Zach in 1867

Rank	Date
Captain (kapetan)	1850
Major	1857
Lieutenant colonel (Potpukovnik)	1862
Colonel (Pukovnik)	1870
General	1875
