= 1880 Serbian parliamentary election =

- 12 December 1880
| Party | Leader | Seats |
|---|---|---|
| Progressive | Milan Piroćanac | 127 |
| Liberal | Jovan Ristić | 7 |
This lists parties that won seats. See the complete results below.
| Prime Minister before | Prime Minister after |
|---|---|
| Milan Piroćanac; Progressive | Milan Piroćanac; Progressive |

Parliamentary elections were held in Serbia on 12 December 1880 to elect members of the National Assembly. As expected, the elections resulted in a majority for the government, whose supporters won 94 seats, whilst Radicals won only 18 seats. By January 1881 the number of government supporters had risen to over 100, whilst the Radicals had split.

== Background ==
Prince Milan signed a decree dissolving the National Assembly and calling elections on 5 November. Unlike the previous elections in which many candidates were returned unopposed, most seats were contested.

== Results ==
The Serbian Progressive Party won 127 seats while the Liberal Party won 7.

== Aftermath ==
Supplementary elections were subsequently held in December 1881 and May 1882.
