= Ranko Alimpić =

Serbian military officer and politician

Vojvoda Ranko Alimpić
- Ранко Алимпић
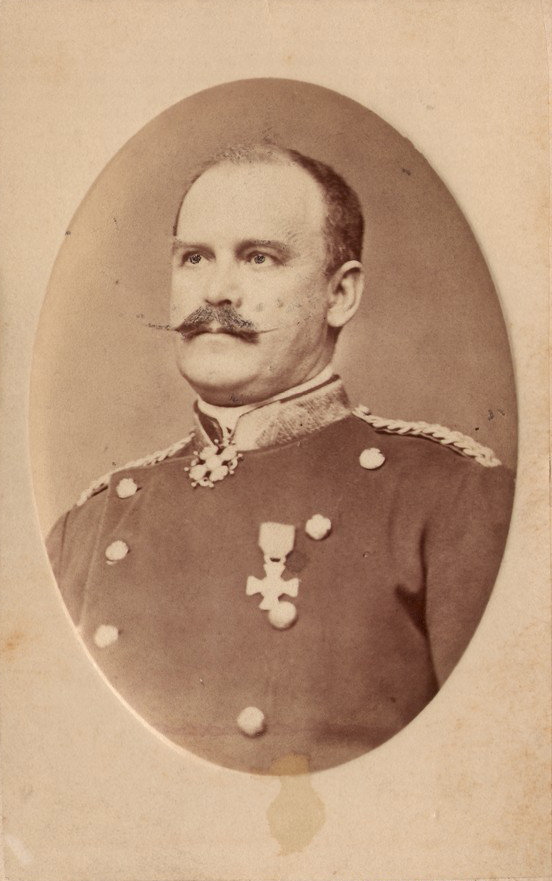
- Portrait of Alimpić, c. 1870s
- Born: 21 March 1826; Nakučani, near Šabac, Principality of Serbia
- Died: 19 November 1882 (aged 56); Belgrade, Kingdom of Serbia
- Spouse: Mileva Alimpić
- Military career
- Allegiance: Principality of Serbia; Kingdom of Serbia
- Rank: General
- Conflicts: Čukur Fountain incident Serbian–Turkish Wars

Ranko Alimpić (Serbian Cyrillic: Ранко Алимпић; 1826 – 1882) was a Serbian military officer and politician. He was a general in command of the Drina Valley during the Serbian–Turkish Wars (1876–1878). He was also a Minister of Public Works. Alimpić is remembered as a voivode. He also served as the 2nd Dean of the Academic Board of the Military Academy in Serbia and its chief (1859–1860).

== Biography ==
=== Youth and education ===
Ranko Alimpić was born in Nakučani, Principality of Serbia, on 9 March 1826, to father Marko, a farmer, and mother Filipa, née Jerotić, from the village of Sinoševac. His paternal ancestors came to this region from Herzegovina. He finished primary school in Nakučani and Šabac, and the First Gymnasium in Kragujevac in 1842. In the same year, he entered the military service, where he progressed rapidly from 1845 when he was promoted to lieutenant, from 1858 to staff captain, from 1859 to major, from 1862 to colonel and from 1876 to general.

From 1846 to 1852 he studied military science in Berlin and Potsdam. At the Military Academy in Belgrade, he was a professor (1852–1859) and then chief of the academy (1859–1860). During that time he was part of a group of revolutionaries ("Liberal Club") that also included Jevrem Grujić and Jovan Ilić; he helped spread propaganda for the cause that eventually led to the election of a national assembly, the abdication of Alexander Karađorđević, and the return to power of Miloš Obrenović I of Serbia.

=== Career during the Principality of Serbia ===
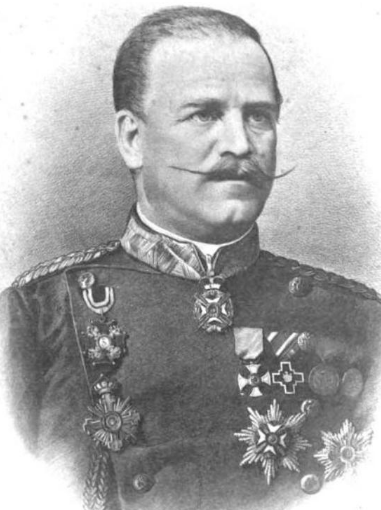
Alimpić as a general

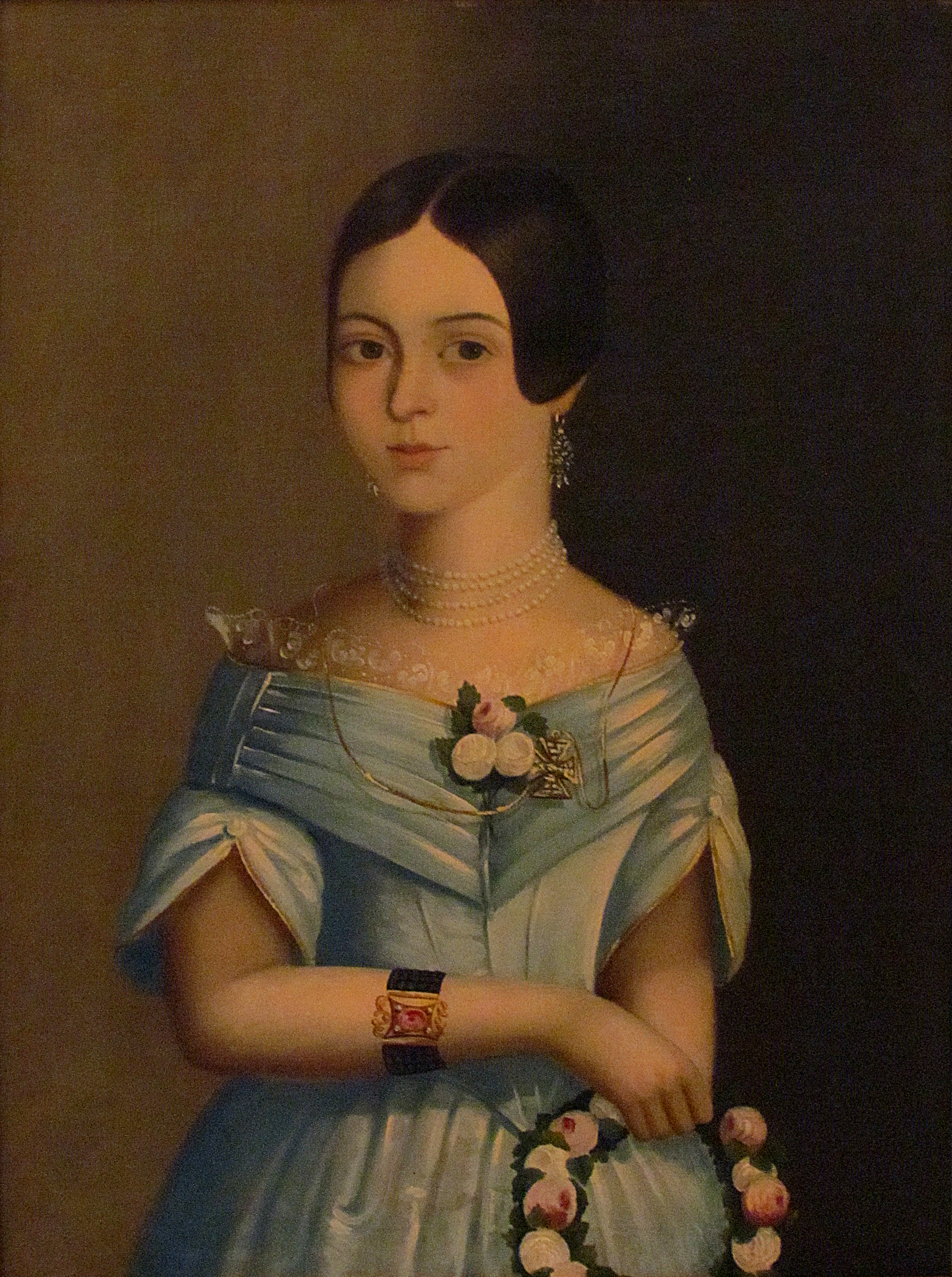
Mileva Alimpić, 1843

From 12 August 1860 to 20 February 1861, he was the chief of Podrinje (the Drina valley). In addition, he was the chief of Krajina and the chief of the Požarevac district. He was a member of the Liberal Party and a supporter of Mihailo Obrenović. The liberals and the Obrenović loyalists used to gather in Alimpić's apartment. During the Turkish bombing of Belgrade immediately after the Čukur česma incident, he commanded Serb forces in the city.

In 1875, he was appointed commander of the border forces at Drina, where he organized volunteers that were then sent to Bosnia. He was responsible for the negotiations with Montenegro about joining forces against the Turks, but Nicholas I of Montenegro stalled negotiations and did not sign a treaty, in part because Nikolay Pavlovich Ignatyev suggested the Sublime Porte offer territory to Montenegro in return for help in putting down the insurrection there. These territorial concessions were never seriously considered by the Turks, but nevertheless, Alimpić returned empty-handed.

When the first of the Serbian Turkish Wars of 1876-1878 broke out, he commanded the Drina army and penetrated Semberija in July 1876. An attack on 3 July on the city of Bijeljina was, in the end, unsuccessful, and he was forced to withdraw to the Drina, where he found himself aided by Bosnian volunteers that he promptly trained; the Turks, meanwhile, reinforced Bijeljina and on 20 July launched a counteroffensive on Alimpić's positions, which cost them dearly. On 11 August a detachment of his troops took up positions across the river to disrupt communications between Bijeljina and Tuzla, but on 16 September the first war was over. Alimpić moved his army back to the Serbian shore and sent 2,000 Bosnian volunteers that he had trained into the Una area.

In 1878 he was appointed Minister of Public Works; Radical politician Pera Todorović called him "General Pasha", alleging that in 1876 Alimpić had been a coward. In this position he was responsible for the construction of the railway Niš - Belgrade, which was demanded by the Treaty of Berlin.

=== Death and legacy ===
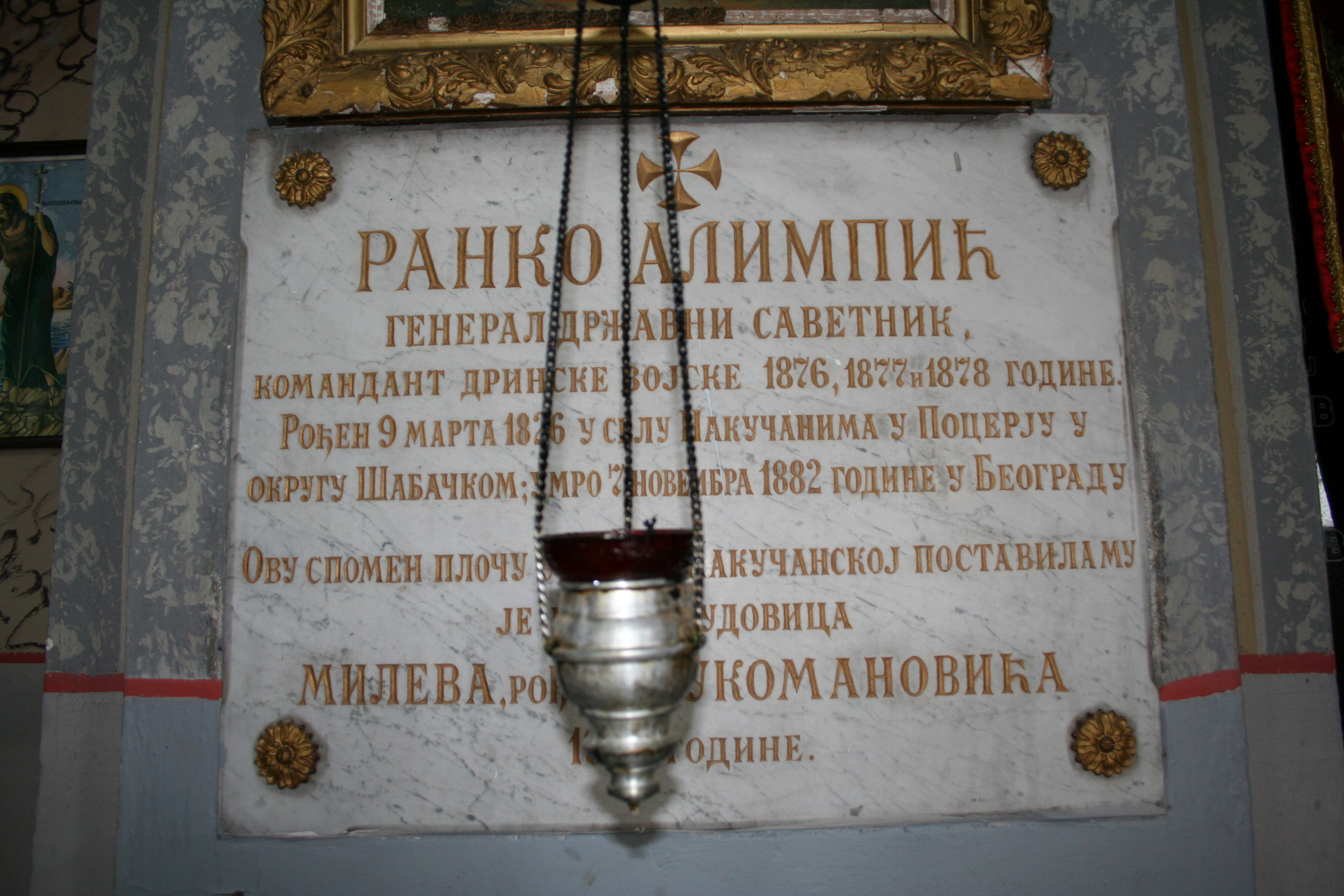
Memorial plaque dedicated to Alimpić

He died in Belgrade on 19 November 1882. His wife Mileva, who worshiped him, had a monument built in his hometown, over a source near the church (earlier, Alimpić had a church bell placed in the church tower) and the school.

His widow wrote a 738-page biography of her husband entitled Život i rad generala Ranka Alimpića : u svezi sa dogaćajima iz najnovije srpske istorije ("Life and work of General Ranko Alimpić in connection with events from Serbian history"), published in Belgrade in 1892. The two of them were the founders of the churches in Banja Koviljača, destroyed after World War II and the church in Nakučani, his birthplace.

In the National Museum of Serbia there is a painting of Alimpić, a work of artist Stevan Todorović. There is also a street named after him in Šabac.
