= Serbian–Ottoman Wars (1876–1878) =

Two conflicts between the Ottoman Empire and the Principality of Serbia from 1876 to 1878

- Part of the Great Eastern Crisis
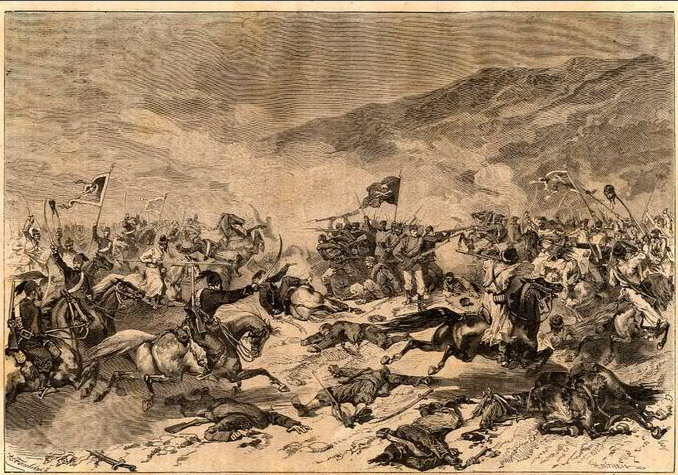
- Battle of Moravac
Date	30 June 1876 – 3 March 1878 (1 year, 8 months and 3 days)
Location	Serbia
Result	Serbian victory
Territorial changes	De jure independence of Serbia from the Ottoman Empire

Belligerents
Serbia; Montenegro; Russia; Foreign volunteers; Bulgarian volunteers; (Kingdom of Italy) Italian volunteers; (Finland) Finnish volunteers; Knights of red cross	Ottoman Empire; (Khedivate of Egypt) Egypt (1876–1877); Albanian volunteers

Commanders and leaders
(Principality of Serbia) František Zach; (Principality of Serbia) Đura Horvatović; (Principality of Serbia) Mihailo Ilić †; (Principality of Serbia) Ranko Alimpić; (Principality of Serbia) Milojko Lešjanin; (Principality of Serbia) (Confederate States of America) Henry McIver; (Russian Empire) Mikhail Chernyayev	(Ottoman Empire) Mehmed Rushdi Pasha; (Ottoman Empire) Abdülkerim Nadir; (Ottoman Empire) Osman Nuri; (Ottoman Empire) Süleyman Hüsnü; (Ottoman Empire) Eyüb Pasha; (Ottoman Empire) Mehmed Ali

Strength
130,000 with 160 guns	153,000 with 192 guns

Casualties and losses
First Serbian-Ottoman War: 6,000 killed, 9,500 wounded Second Serbian-Ottoman War: 5,410 dead and wounded (708 killed, 1,534 died, missing 159, wounded 2,999)	First Serbian-Ottoman War: 1,000+ killed, several thousand wounded Second Serbian-Ottoman War: 3,400 killed, 4,000 wounded, 1,750 taken prisoner

The Serbian–Ottoman Wars (Serbian: Српско-османски ратови, romanized: Srpsko-osmanski ratovi), also known as the Serbian–Turkish Wars or Serbian Wars for Independence (Српски ратови за независност, Srpski ratovi za nezavisnost), were two consequent wars (1876–1877 and 1877–1878), fought between the Principality of Serbia and the Ottoman Empire. In conjunction with the Principality of Montenegro, Serbia declared war on the Ottoman Empire on 30 June 1876. By the intervention of major European powers, ceasefire was concluded in autumn, and the Constantinople Conference was organized. Peace was signed on 28 February 1877 on the basis of status quo ante bellum. After a brief period of formal peace, Serbia declared war on the Ottoman Empire on 13 December 1877. Renewed hostilities lasted until February 1878.

At the beginning of the conflict, the Serbian army was poorly trained and ill-equipped, unlike the troops of the Ottoman Empire. The offensive objectives the Serbian army sought to accomplish were overly ambitious for such a force, and they suffered a number of defeats that resulted from poor planning and chronically being spread too thin. This allowed Ottoman forces to repel the initial attacks of the Serbian army and drive them back. During the autumn of 1876, the Ottoman Empire continued their successful offensive which culminated in a victory on the heights above Đunis. During the second conflict, between 13 December 1877 and 5 February 1878, Serbian troops regrouped with help from Imperial Russia, who fought their own Russo-Turkish War. The Serbs formed five corps and attacked Ottoman troops to the south, taking the cities of Niš, Pirot, Leskovac and Vranje one after another. The war coincided with the Bulgarian uprising, the Montenegrin–Ottoman War and the Russo-Turkish War, which together are known as the Great Eastern Crisis of the Ottoman Empire.

== Background and the opposing forces ==
In 1875, a revolt of Serbs broke out in Herzegovina, a province of the Ottoman Empire, which soon spread to other regions of the Vilayet of Bosnia, and in the spring of 1876 an uprising of Christian population also broke out in Bulgaria. Although the Ottoman Empire quickly suppressed the revolt in Bulgaria, the fighting in Herzegovina and Bosnia continued to drag on. In the same time, political instability in the Turkish capital culminated on 30 May (1876) when sultan Abdülaziz was deposed and replaced with Murad V. Taking advantage of the opportunity, the two semi-independent principalities of Serbia and Montenegro opted for independence and declared war on the Ottoman Empire on 18 June 1876.

== Forces ==
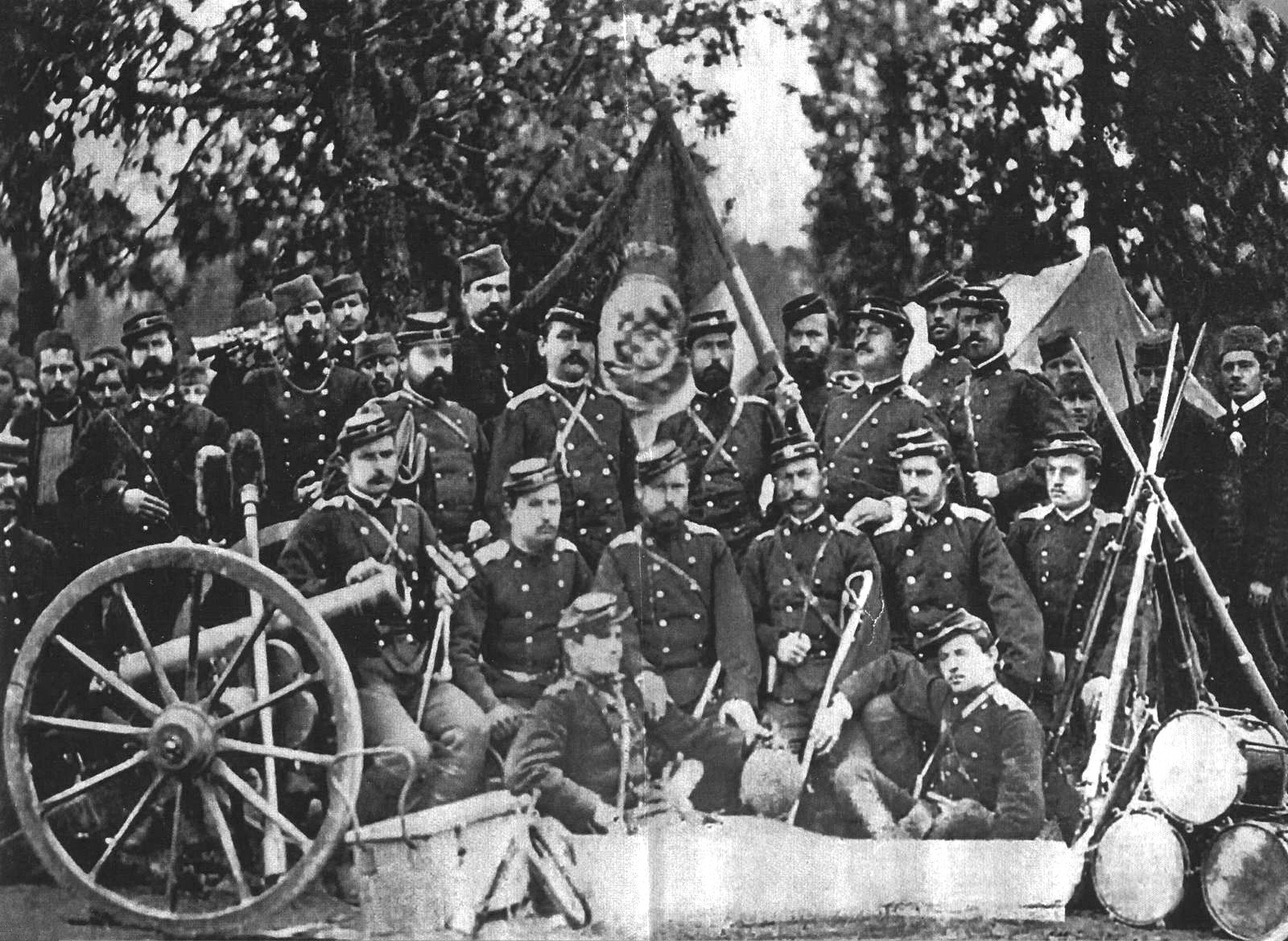
Serbian military camp during the war in 1876.

The main Serbian army under Commander-in-Chief Mikhail Chernyayev, a Russian general, concentrated at the Southern fortress of Aleksinac. It consisted of three Serbian divisions and a variety of volunteer formations totaling about 45,000 men. In the northeast, Milojko Lešjanin based at Zaječar commanded an infantry division (6,000) with cavalry support and the Bulgarian Legion (2,000). In the west there were two weak divisions (3,500 each), one in the southwest at Užice commanded by František Zach and one in the northwest at Šabac commanded by Ranko Alimpić.

The main rifle was the Peabody M.1870 which had a performance similar to the M1867 Russian Krnka. Whilst the Peabody was the best weapon available to Serbian troops many had to make do with the erratic M.1867 Serbian Green conversion and other breechloaders, and even muzzleloaders (about 39,000 Russian musket model 1845/63 and 7,000 Belgian rifle model 1849/56). Officers were armed with Francotte Revolver m/1871. Artillery batteries contained a variety of mostly bronze guns almost all inferior to the Ottoman Krupps. There were very few cavalry squadrons reflecting the nature of the terrain and those which existed were poorly equipped. At that time Serbia was accepting all volunteers; there were many volunteers from different countries, including Russians, Bulgarians, Italian followers of Giuseppe Garibaldi and Prussian officers, and also Englishmen, Frenchmen, Greeks, Romanians and Poles. The biggest detachments were those of the Russians and Bulgarians. During the war of 1876–1877 a detachment was created consisting of several hundreds of Italian volunteers. Russian volunteer detachments formally independent of the Russian state stood up in defense of Serbia. The biggest number of Russian volunteers fought in the Timok-Morava Army, their number reaching around 2,200, out of which there were 650 officers and 300 medical personnel.

The main Ottoman army was based at Sofia under Abdul Kerim with 50,000 men plus irregulars (bashi-bazouk) and Circassians. There was a garrison at the border fortress of Niš commanded by Mehmed Ali with 8,000 men. At Vidin, Osman Nuri had 23,000 men. In the west, in the Sanjak of Bosnia, there were small garrisons at Bijeljina and Zvornik with a larger force (12,000 mostly Egyptians) organized in three infantry regiments under the command of Hosni Rashid Pasha (Egyptian Army) and Dervish Pasha and Mehmed Ali. Substantial numbers of Redif troops were called up for this war mostly armed with former British Sniders. The superior Peabody–Martini was becoming more widely available and was certainly used by the Egyptian troops.

== Operations ==
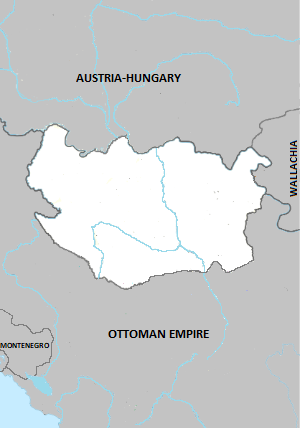
Serbian–Ottoman Wars (1876–1878) on the map of the Principality of Serbia. Locations under Ottoman rule before 1878 are marked in green.

=== First War (1876–1877) ===
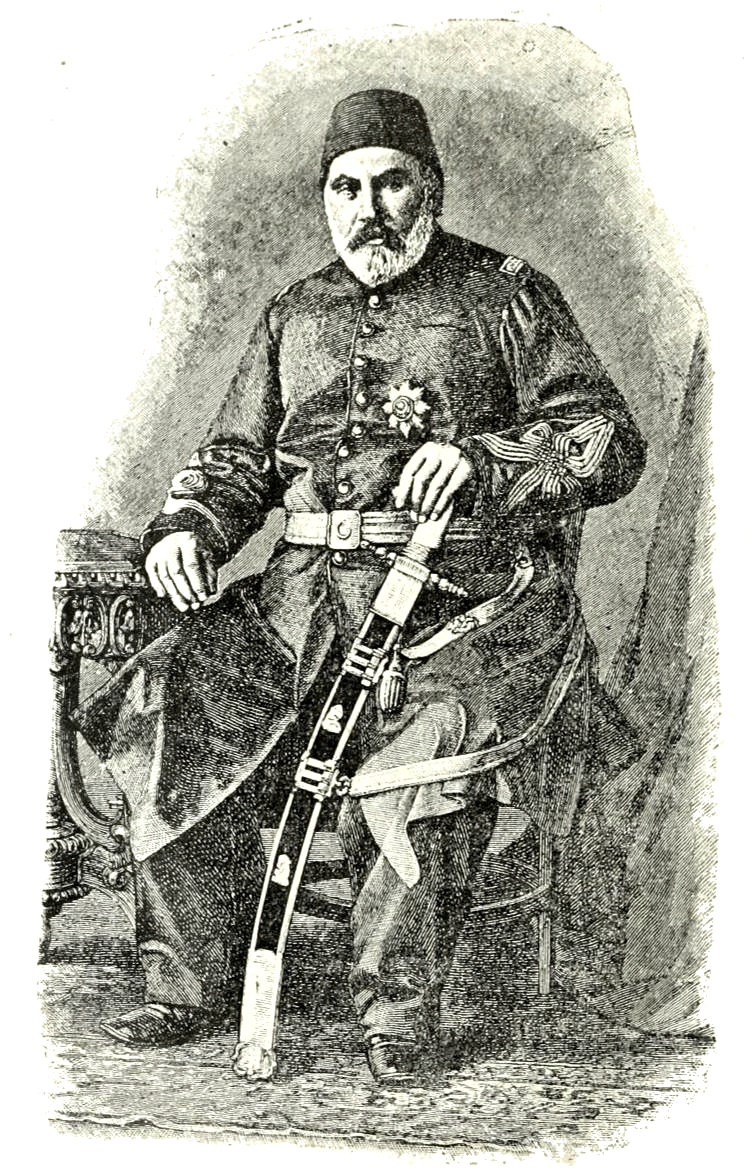
Chief of General Staff of the Ottoman army Abdul Kerim

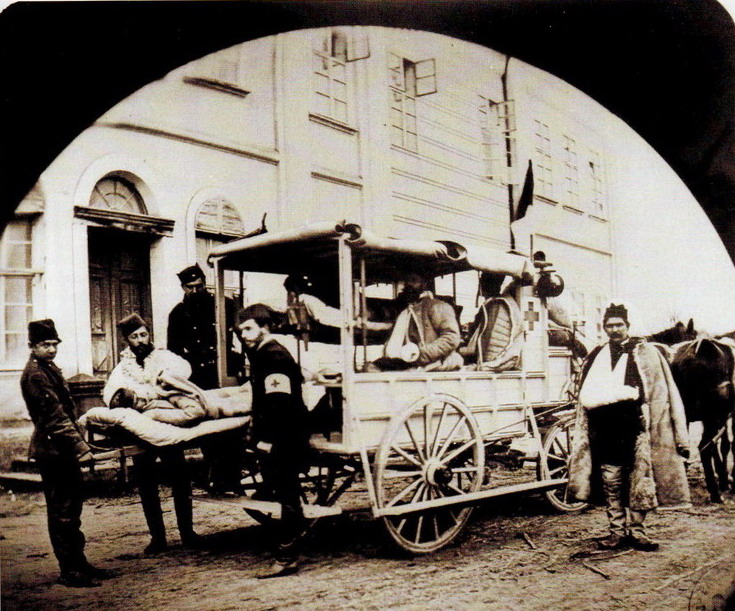
Serbian ambulance in 1876.

The first phase, known as the First Serbian–Ottoman War (Први српско-турски рат/Prvi srpsko-turski rat), took place between 30 June 1876 and 28 February 1877. The Serbian government declared war on the Ottoman Empire on the symbolic Vidovdan (15 June 1876 Julian = 27 June 1876 Gregorian), the anniversary of the Battle of Kosovo (15 June 1389 Julian). The initial Serbian military plan was to defend Niš and attack towards Sofia, Pirot and Bela Palanka with the main army under Chernyayev. Other armies would simultaneously launch diversionary attacks, but these were repulsed in the west. In the north-east, general Milojko Lešjanin was defeated near Kior after failing to hold the Ottoman advance over the Timok river. Although he withdrew to the fortress at Saicar, the Ottoman army captured it on 7 August 1876. The Serbian army's main advance in the south appeared to initially meet with success when it moved quickly down the Nišava valley and captured the important heights at Babina Glava, north of Pirot. They were forced to withdraw, however, when the Ottomans responded by sending two columns under Suleiman and Hafiz to flank the Serbian position. General Ranko Alimpić crossed the Drina in July 1876 but was unsuccessful in capturing Bijeljina.

The Ottoman commander Abdul Kerim decided against marching over the difficult mountain terrain between the Timok and Morava rivers and instead concentrated 40,000 troops at Niš and advanced up the easier country of the Morava valley towards Aleksinac. Chernyayev had less than 30,000 men, and unlike the Ottoman commander he stretched them thinly across both sides of the Morava river and into the mountains. Consequently, when contact was made between the two forces, the Serbian troops were overwhelmed by massed Ottoman firepower. A bayonet charge shortly followed and routed the Serbian troops from the field. Thanks to Abdul Kerim's indecisiveness and the arrival of Horvatović's fresh forces, a new Serbian defensive line was created at Djunis.

The Ottomans invaded eastern Serbia in late July and captured the towns of Knjaževac and Zaječar, pursuing a scorched earth policy. Serbian civilians, women, men, old people and children were brutally massacred and their corpses mutilated; women were raped. A Serbian government later described how people were cut into pieces by sabres. In August, at the Battle of Šumatovac, Serbian forces under Kosta Protić succeeded in holding Ottoman advances. An unsuccessful attack by the Ottomans on Bobovište followed and a general advance was undertaken by the Serbian army on 20 August. In mid-September, they were forced back across the Drina.

Following this string of setbacks and defeats, Serbia petitioned the European powers to mediate a diplomatic solution to the war. A joint ultimatum from the European powers forced the Ottoman Empire into accepting a one-month truce with Serbia, during which peace negotiations were held.

When the truce expired, the war continued and the new Serbian commander, Horvatović, attacked the Ottoman positions along a broad front from Djunis to Aleksinac on 28 September 1876, but the Ottoman troops repulsed the attacks. The Ottoman forces reorganized and regrouped, and on 19 October 1876 the army of Adyl Pasha launched a surprise attack on the Serbian right which forced the Serbians back to Deligrad.

On 31 October 1876, with the situation becoming dire and Serbian forces about to collapse, Russia mobilized its army and threatened to declare war on the Ottoman Empire if they did not sign a truce with Serbia and renew the peace negotiations within forty-eight hours. These negotiations lasted until 15 January 1877. On 28 February 1877, a peace treaty was signed in Constantinopole that restored status quo ante bellum. Having gained financial backing from Russia, Serbia again declared war against the Ottoman Empire on 14 December.

=== Second War (1877–1878) ===
Battle of Vranje took place between 26 and 31 January 1878 and it represented final stage of the Second war.

The second phase, known as the Second Serbian–Ottoman War (Други српско-турски рат/Drugi srpsko-turski rat), took place between 13 December 1877 and 5 February 1878. It ended with a Serbian victory. By early 1878, the Royal Serbian Army had captured most of the South Morava basin, reaching as far as Preševo and Vitina. On 31 January they took Vranje.

== Aftermath ==
The outcome of the war's were decided in part by the Congress of Berlin (1878). Serbia gained international recognition as an independent state, and its territory expanded.

Some 200,000 people were left homeless as a result of the conflict. Many children were orphaned as a result of the Serbo-Turkish Wars. The situation in Serbia was very serious, described by some as "children in huge groups reaching towns". At that time Serbia had underdeveloped social care system. Being aware of all that, 50 most prominent citizens of Belgrade decided to establish the "Society for the bringing up and protection of children", in the Kasina Hotel on Terazije Square, in 1879. In this facility the first vocational school in Serbia was established.

During and after the Serbian–Ottoman War of 1876–1878, between 49,000 and 130,000 Albanians were expelled by the Serbian army from the former Sanjak of Niș to the Turkish Vilayet of Kosovo and Macedonia. As a result, Serb civilians in the Kosovo Vilayet were subjected to attacks by some Albanian refugees and Albanian-Ottoman soldiers.

== Legacy ==
In 1876, Pyotr Ilyich Tchaikovsky composed and orchestrated the Marche slave.

At the close of Tolstoy's 1877 novel Anna Karenina, the character of Count Aleksey Vronsky enlists in a Russian volunteer regiment traveling to the aid of the Serbians.

In 1882, Laza K. Lazarević (1851–91), wrote the short story The People Will Reward All of This. The author describes the difficult position of disabled war veterans after returning from the battlefield and inhuman attitude of the state towards them. Serbian writer Dobrilo Nenadić published a trilogy of novels set during the wars: Sabre of Count Vronski (2002), Victors (2004) and Grumpiness of Prince Bizmark (2005).

== Gallery ==
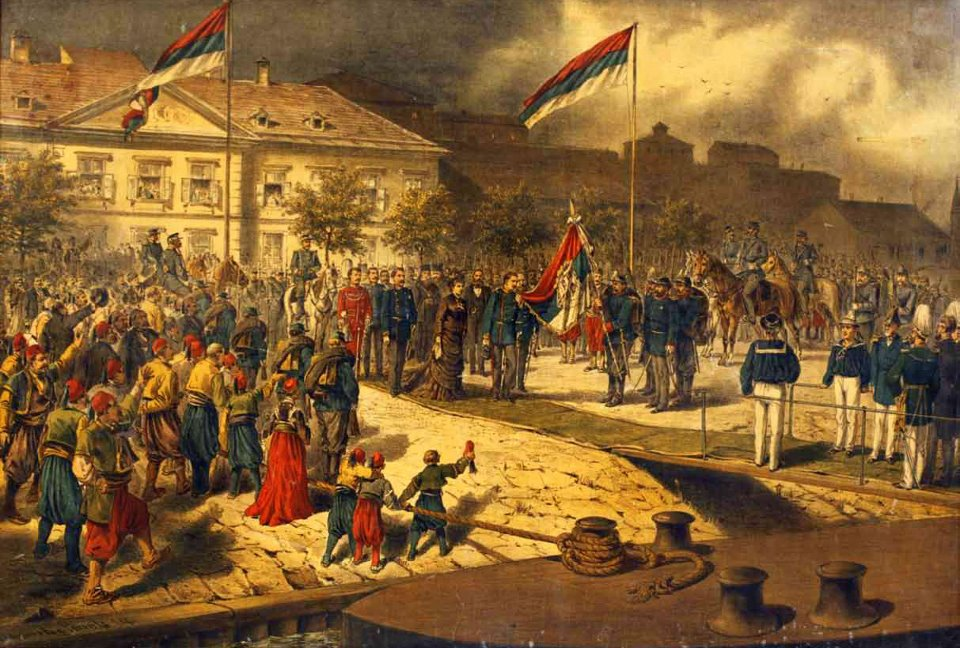
King Milan Obrenović goes to war, 1876

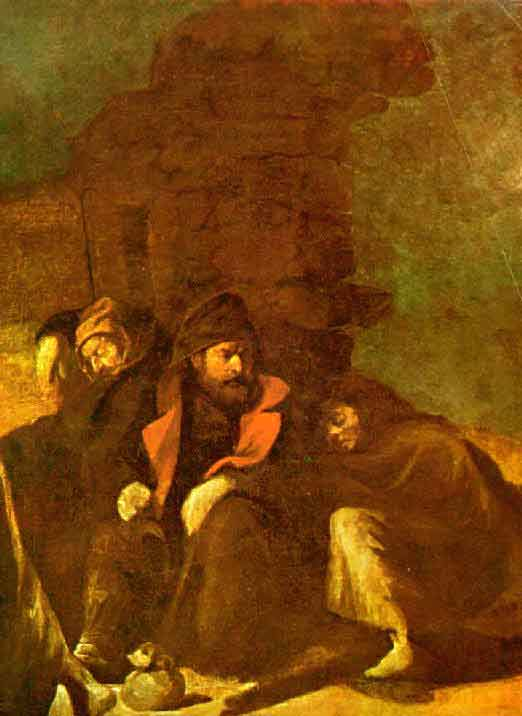
Painting of Djura Jaksic dedicated to Serbo-Turkish war

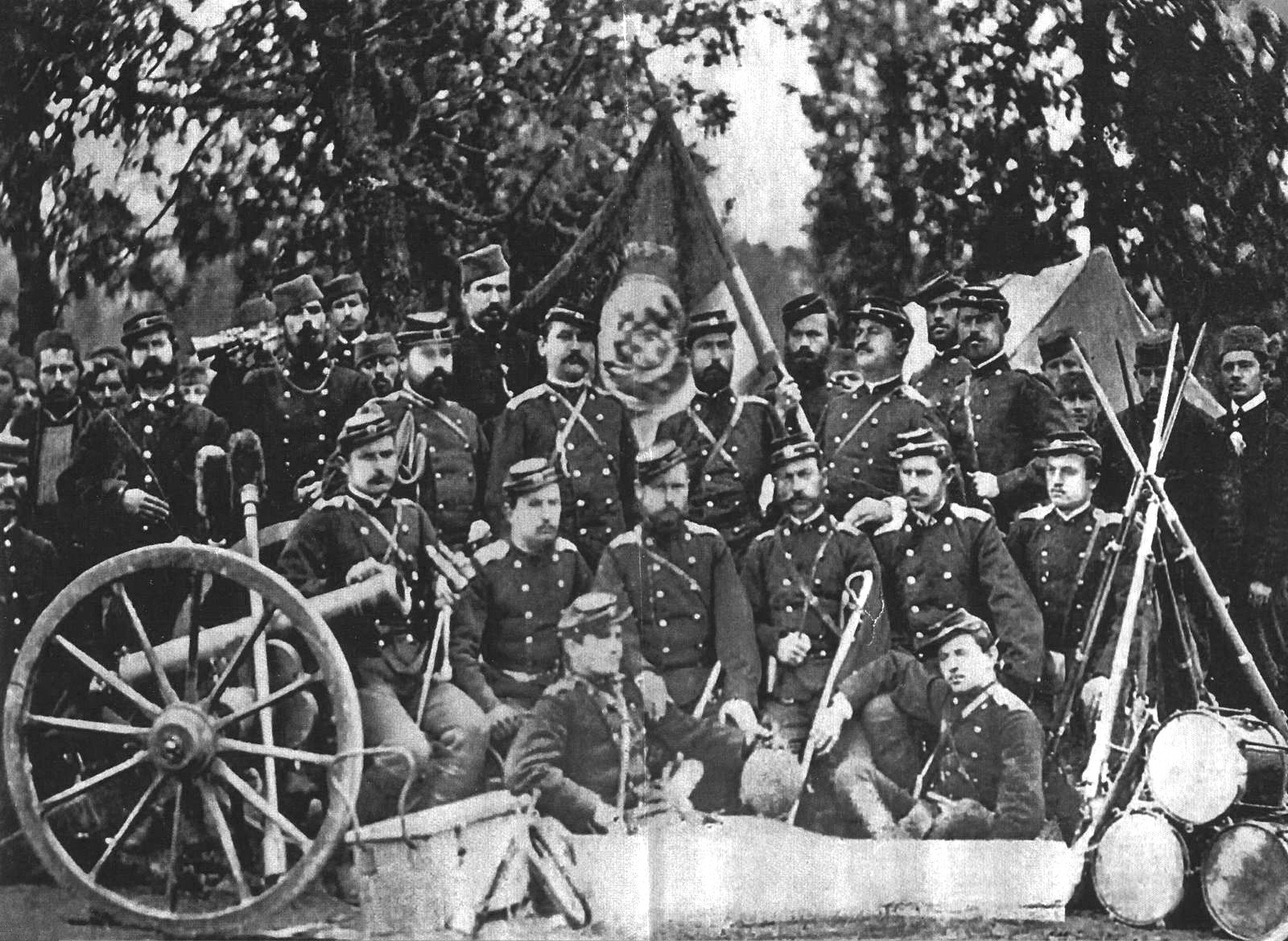
Serbian military camp, 1876

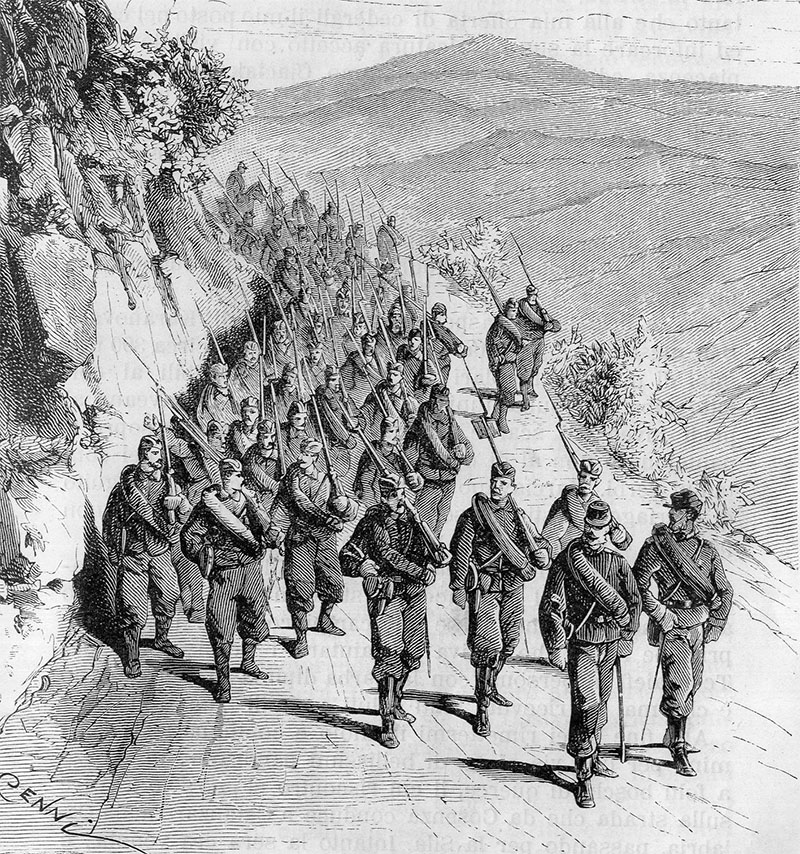
Serbian soldiers marching, 1876

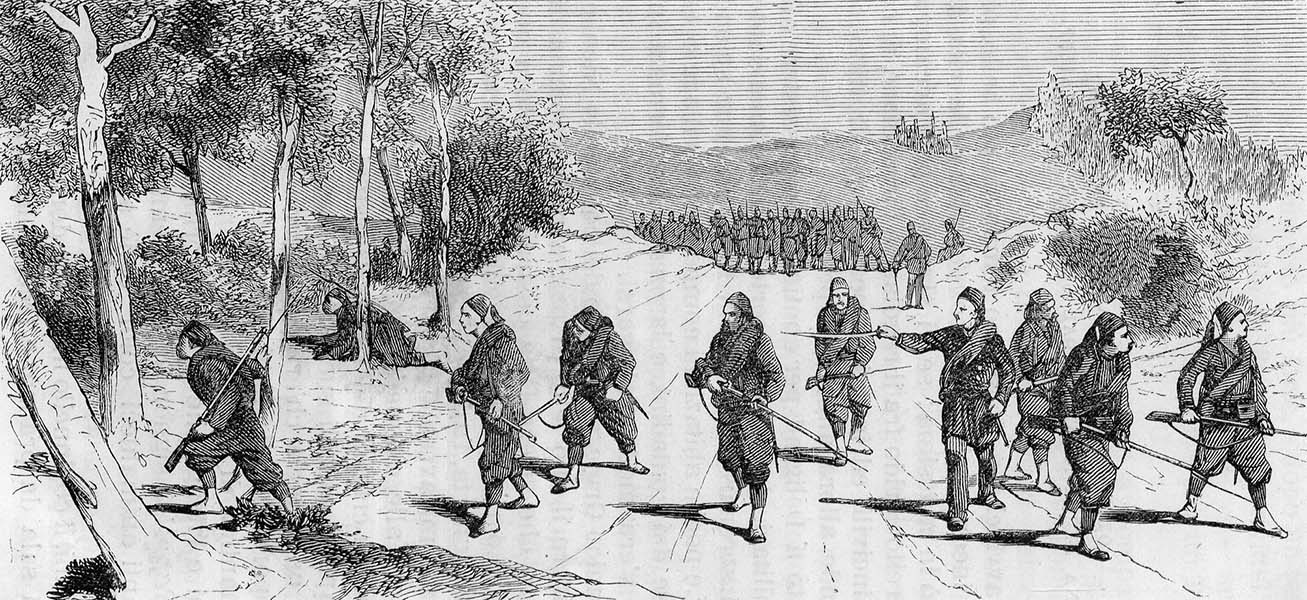
Ottoman reconnaissance in Deligrad, 1876

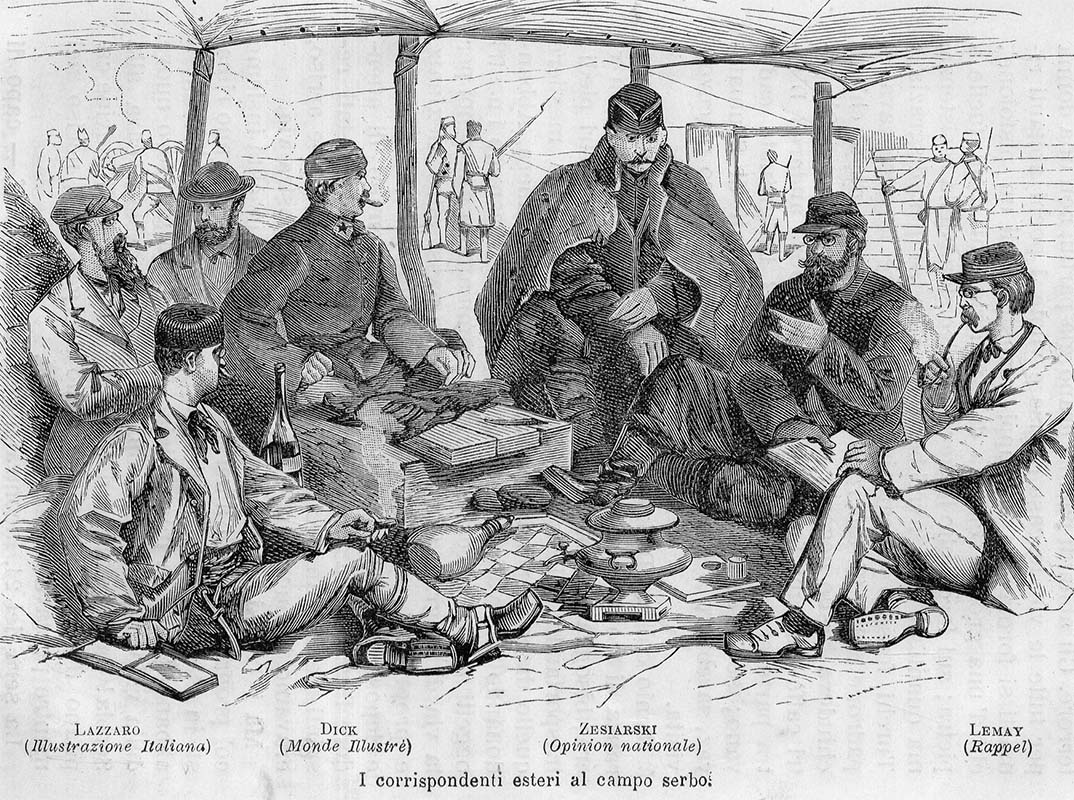
War correspondents in Serbian camp, 1876

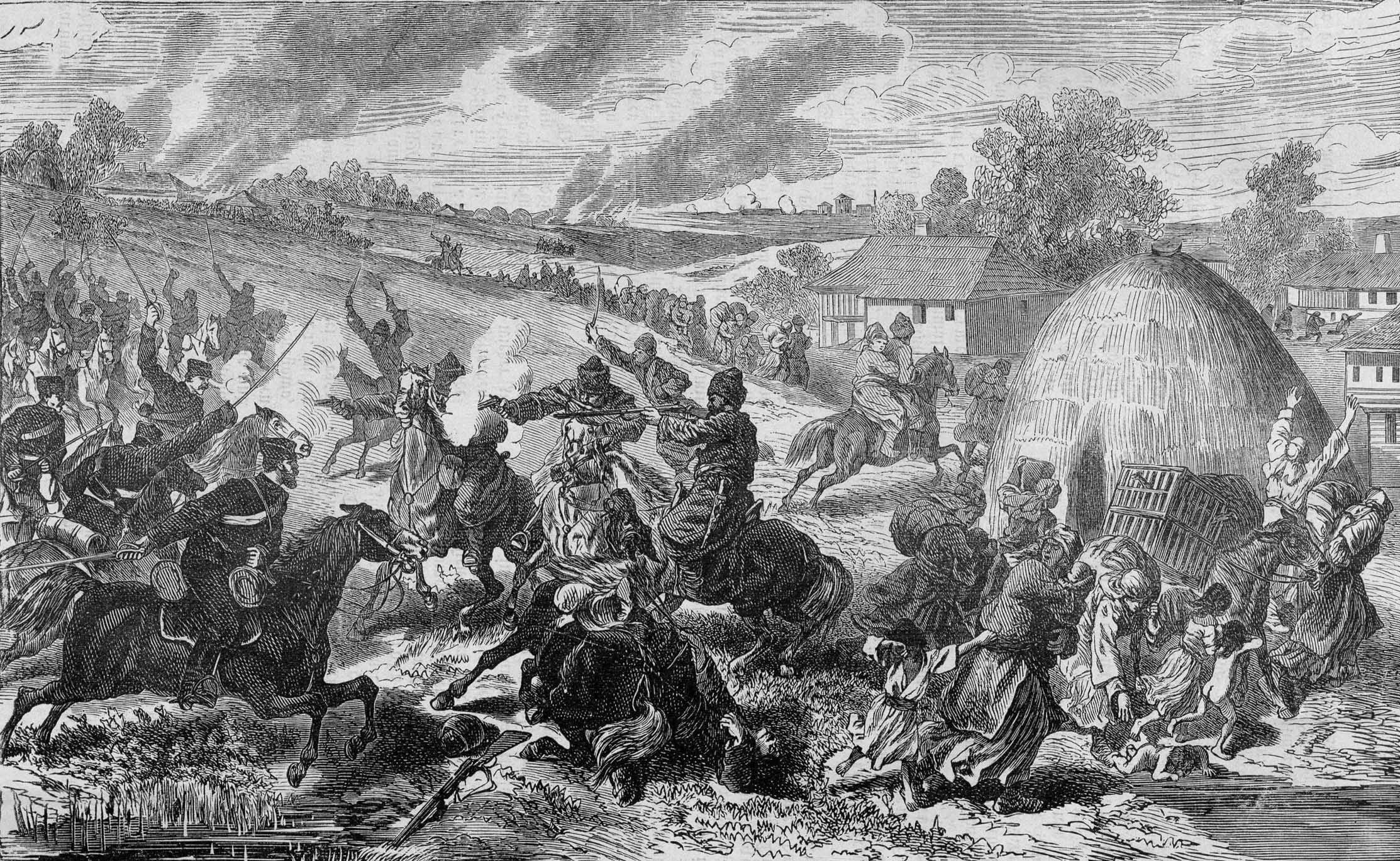
Clash with Cherkessians

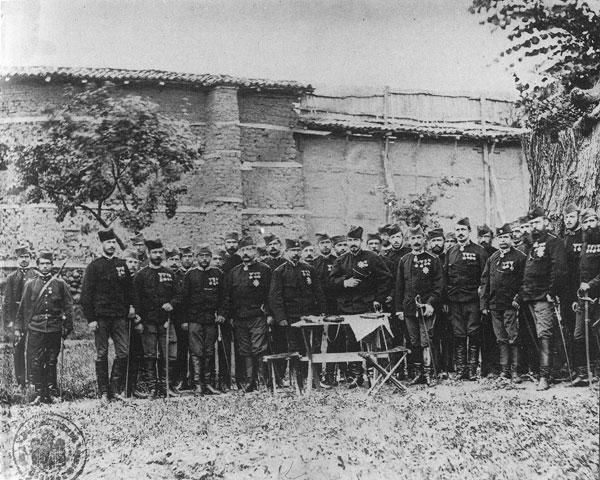
Supreme Command of the Serbian Army 1876–1877

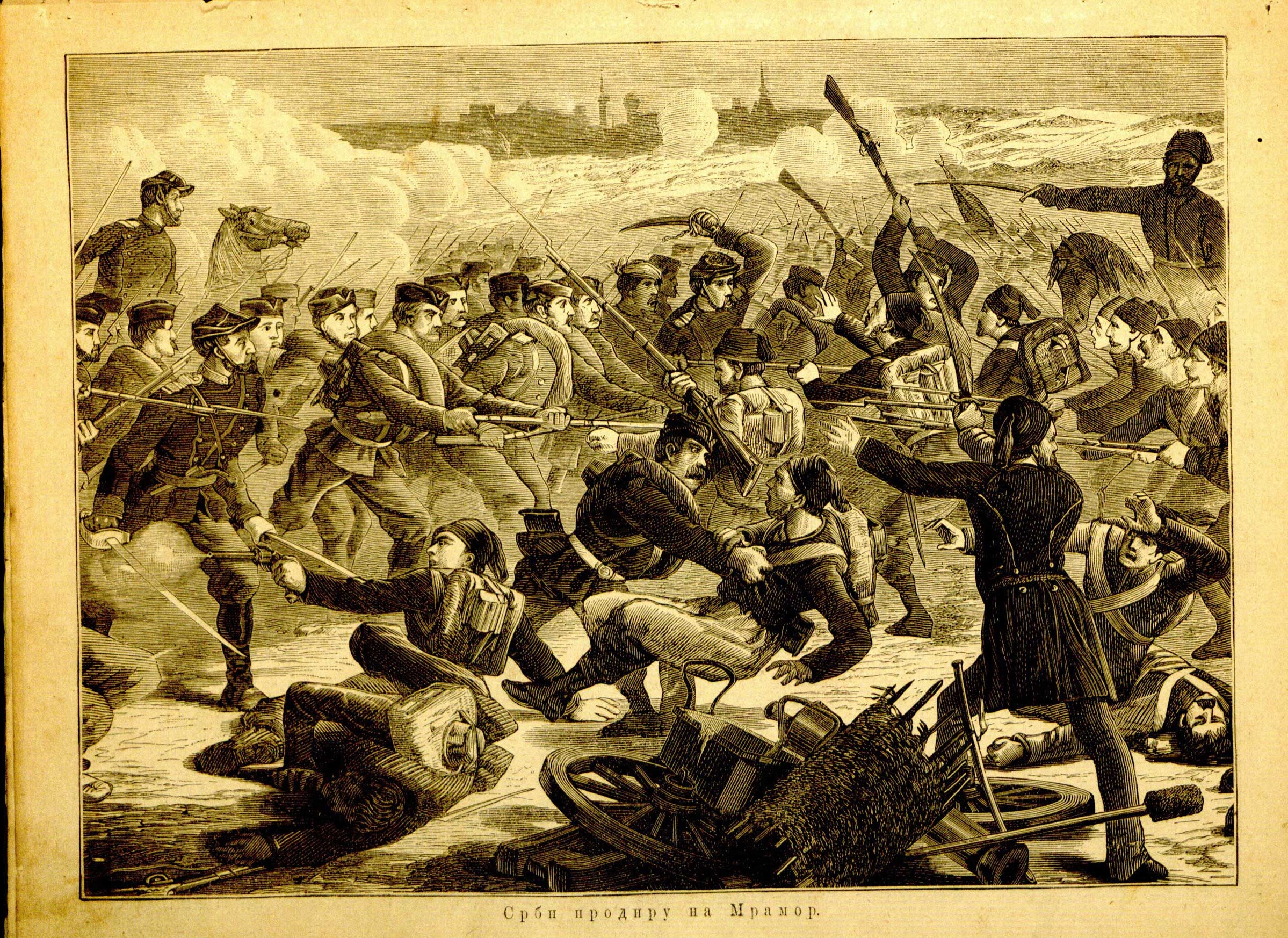
Serbian soldiers attacking the Ottoman army at Mramor, 1877

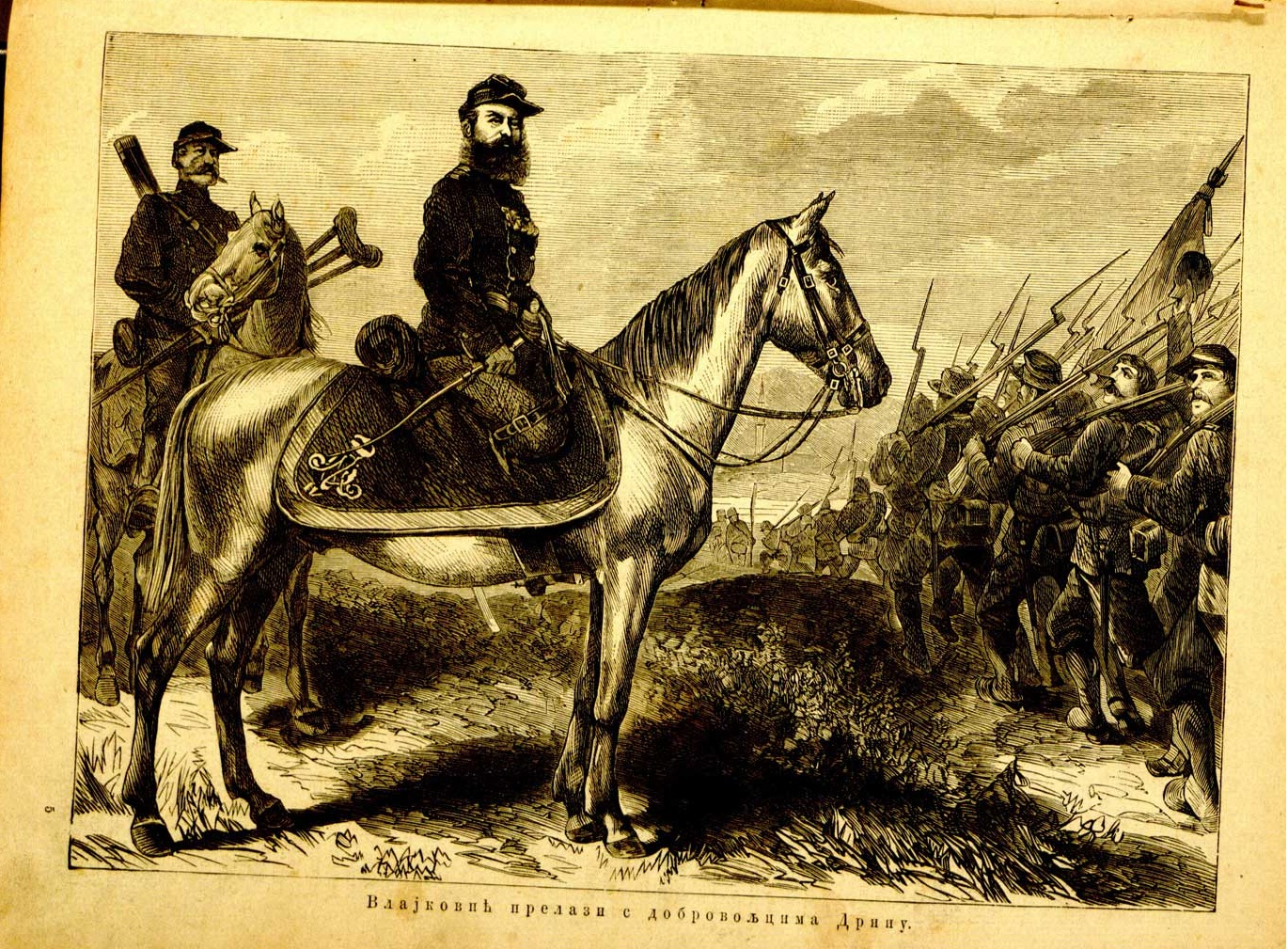
Đorđe Vlajković crosses the Drina with volunteer squads, 1877

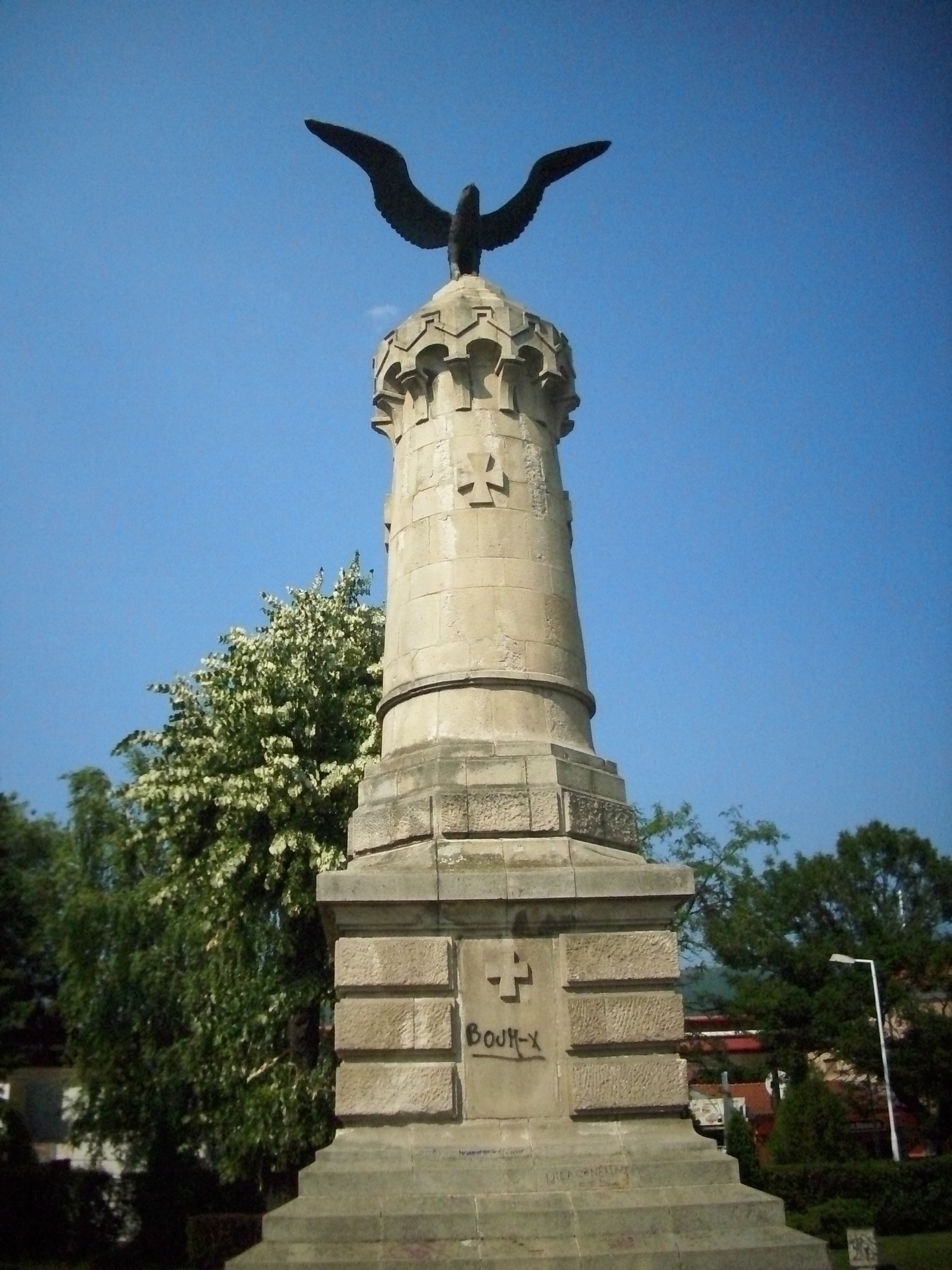
Memorial to the fallen in the Second Serbo-Turkish War in Pirot

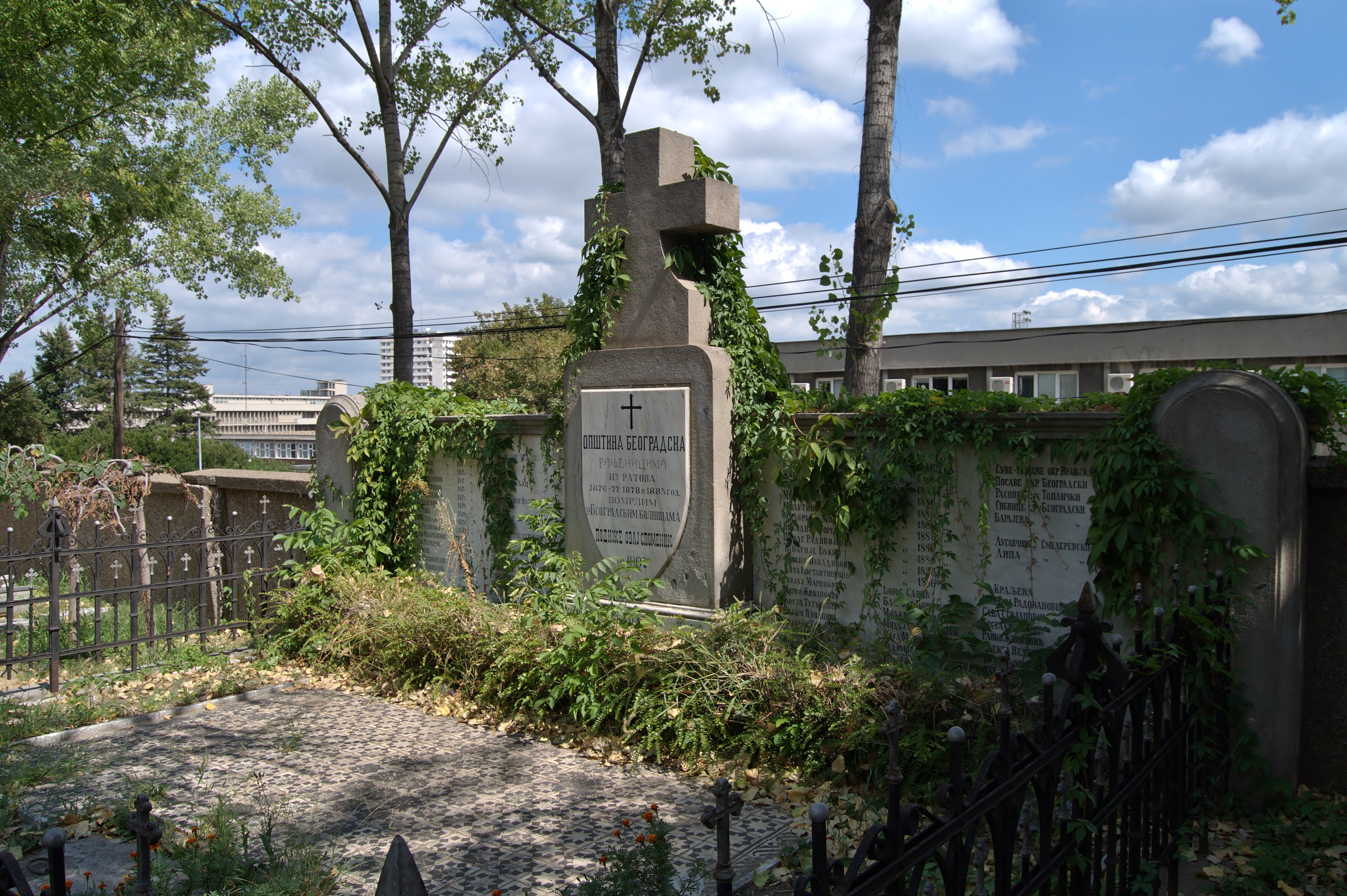
Monument in the Belgrade New Cemetery

== See also ==
- Expulsion of the Albanians 1877–1878
- Attacks on Serbs during the Serbian–Ottoman Wars (1876–1878)

== Sources ==
- Jovanović, Slobodan (1990). Sabrana dela Slobodana Jovanovića: Vlada Milana Obrenovića II. Radovan Samardžić, Živorad Stojković. Beograd: BIGZ. ISBN 86-13-00435-0. OCLC 22963111.
