= Tihomilj Nikolić =

Serbian minister of defence

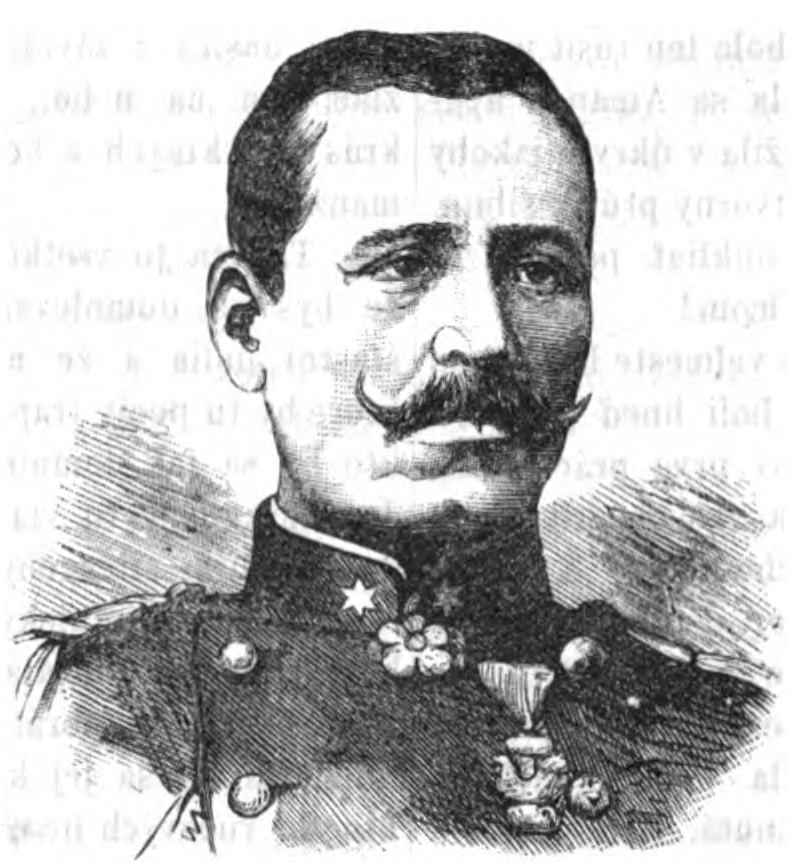
Portrait of Tihomilj Nikolić from year 1876.

Tihomilj Nikolić also nicknamed Teša (1832 – 1886) was a Serbian general and manager of the Military Academy in Belgrade. He succeeded the Minister of Defence Kosta Protić in August 1875.

== Biography ==
Tihomilj Nikolić or Teša as everyone called him was born in Kragujevac, where he attends primary school. He graduated from the Velika škola and the Military Academy, and trained as artillery lieutenant in Belgium. He also graduated from the Royal Military Academy, then called École royale militaire. As a state cadet, he continued his training (artillery) abroad, in Belgium, France and Germany. Upon his return to Serbia, he joined the army as an artillery commander in Užice. In 1858, he was elected professor at the Military Academy in Belgrade and was promoted to the rank of major, who commanded a battery. Later, with the rank of lieutenant colonel, he was a personal companion of Prince Milan Obrenović. In 1873, as a colonel, he commanded the Belgrade garrison.

He was the commander of the standing army in 1874 and 1875 at the eve of the Herzegovinian uprising, the government of Danilo Stefanović fell, in which he was the Minister of War during the Serbian-Turkish Wars. He was also in the Cabinet of Stevča Mihailović II with Jovan Ristić as Minister of War, the Cabinet of Ljubomir Kaljević where he held the post of Minister of Armed Forces as well as other later governments (1882–1883). He was a man that could be trusted, who prudently presented his views and easily won over the listeners. During his time, preparations were made for The First Serbian-Turkish War and under it ended. In the Second Serbian-Turkish War, he was the commander of the Ibar Army, which distinguished itself on Javor (mountain in Serbia).

Teša distinguished himself as a capable royal commissioner during the suppression of the so-called Timok Rebellion.

He was married to the once divorced daughter of Jovan Obrenović who was connected with the House of Obrenović which may have helped Teša advance to the rank of general more rapidly during the reign of that dynasty.

Teša was the first president of the Belgrade Gymnastics and Wrestling Society.

== Decorations ==
- Order of the Cross of Takovo of the 1st order
- Order of the Cross of Takovo with Swords
- Order of the White Eagle, 3rd Class – Commander's Cross
- Monument to the War of Liberation and Independence 1876-1878
- Medal of the Restored Kingdom

=== Foreign decorations ===
- Order of Franz Joseph, First Class;
- Order of the Iron Crown (Austria), Knight Third Class;
- Order of the Saviour of the 2nd class: Grand Commander ('Ανώτερος Ταξιάρχης') – wears the badge of the Order on a necklet, and the star of the Order on the right chest;
- Order of the Crown (Romania);
- Order of Saint Stanislaus 2nd Class, Imperial Russia;
- Order of the Medjidie, Second Class Order (Gold) - given by Sultan;
- Red Cross Medal (Belgium)

== See also ==
- Ministry of Defence
- Cabinet of Milan Piroćanac
- Dragutin Franasović
- Milojko Lešjanin
- Đura Horvatović
- Jovan Belimarković
- Božidar Janković
