= Jovan Mišković =

Serbian general

- Јован Мишковић
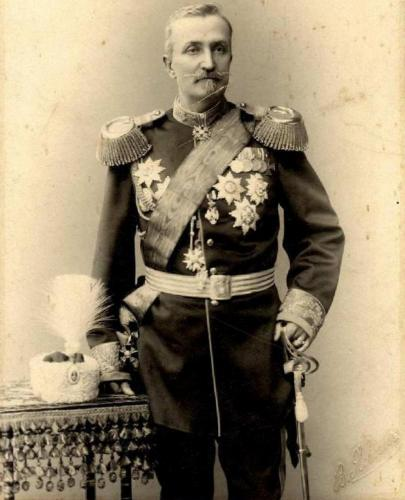

Minister of Defence
- In office 1878–1880
- Monarch: Milan of Serbia
- Preceded by: Mihailo Vujić
- Succeeded by: Sava Grujić

Personal details
- Born: 14 July 1844 Negotin, Principality of Serbia
- Died: 2 November 1908 (aged 64) Belgrade, Kingdom of Serbia
- Occupation: General, Minister of Defence military theorist, writer, academic

Jovan Mišković (Serbian Cyrillic: Јован Мишковић; (Negotin, 18 July 1844 – Belgrade, 2 November 1908) was a Serbian general, Minister of Defence, military theorist, writer and the president of Serbian academy of sciences and arts.

== Biography ==
Mišković was born in Negotin in 1844, and in 1865 he graduated from the Belgrade Artillery School. During Serbian-Turkish War of 1876–1877 he commanded the Čačak brigade and later on the Užice brigade. In the Second Serbo-Turkish War in 1877–1878, he was Chief of the Operational Department of the Supreme Command and the Timok headquarters.

From 1878 to 1880 Miškovič was the new Minister of Defense, known for introducing a new formation and carrying out a partial reorganization of the Serbian army. From 1883 to 1885, he was the leader of the active army and its headquarters.

Mišković was the commander In the Serbian-Bulgarian War of 1885, leading the Drina division and participating in the Battle of Slivnitsa and the fighting around Pirot.

He was appointed the Chief of the Serbian General Staff from 1888 to 1890.

Jovan Mišković was a regular member of the Serbian Scientific Society of Serbia and the Mathematical Committee and later on a regular member of the Serbian Academy of Sciences and Arts in 1908, and its president in one term. He wrote many articles from the history of wars, tactics and geography and translated several works from French. He also held the post of president of The Red Cross of Serbia from 1896 to 1897 when he was succeeded by General Stevan Zdravković.

He married a daughter of Milivoje Blaznavac and they had two sons. Mišković was considered to be one of the most educated Serbian officers of his time as well as an example of high moral standards and ethics.

== Works ==
He traveled throughout Serbia and gave descriptions of many areas.

- "History of Serbia" (1880),
- "From the War of the Serbs with the Turks" (1882, 1883)
- "Serbian Army and Warfare during the Uprising of 1804–1815. year (1895)
- "Travel to Serbia" (1874)
- "Hydrography of the Independent Principality of Serbia" (1880)
- "Through Bosnia, Herzegovina and Boka Kotorska" (1897)
- Description of the Mining District (1872)
- "The war of Serbia with Turkey 1877–1878" (1879)
- "From the Knjazevac district" (1881) for the purpose of getting to know the terrain of a military-strategic karaktear with a geographic-topographic image is considered the first work of a scientifically-scientific character about this region, whose author is not a foreigner.
- "Two old churches in Knjazevac district", with descriptions of the monastery of the Holy Trinity near Donja Kamenica and the Church of the Holy Mother of God, Donja Kamenica, published in the Star of the Serbian Archaeological Society
- "Some old towns and their surroundings in the Kingdom of Serbia", with a special accent on Ravnu and Koželj, published in the Star of the Serbian Archaeological Society

== Orders and decorations ==
- Order of Miloš the Great I degree, (Serbia)
- Order of the White Eagle III, IV and V degree, (Serbia)
- Order of the Cross of Takovo I degree, (Serbia)
- Order of the Cross of Takovo II degree, (Serbia)
- Order of the Cross of Takovo with swords II and III degree, (Serbia)
- Order of Saint Sava I degree, (Serbia)
- Golden medal for bravery, (Serbia)
- Silver medal for bravery, (Serbia)
- Medal for military merits, (Serbia)
- Commemorative medal of the wars with Turkey 1876–1878, (Serbia)
- Commemorative medal of the war with Bulgaria 1885, (Serbia)
- Order of Franz Joseph, Knight's Cross (Austria-Hungary)
- Order of the Iron Crown (Austria), (Austria-Hungary)
- Order of Saint Alexander, I degree, Kingdom of Bulgaria
- Order of Saint Stanislaus, II degree, (Russian Empire)
- Order of Saint Stanislaus, III degree, (Russian Empire)
- Order of the Medjidie, II class (Ottoman Empire)
- Legion of Honour, Officer (France)
- Legion of Honour, Commandeur (France)
- Order of the Crown (Romania)

== Origins ==
Feeling like a Serb, which seems to have been disputed at times, he wrote about his origins in one of his notebooks:

'My grandfather was named Mijajlo, and my father Radovan. My grandfather lived in the village of Samarinovac (from samar - packsaddle), which was Serbian at the time, but is now Vlach. When my grandfather's first wife, who gave birth to my father Radovan, passed away, he married a second time—to a Vlach woman from the village of Džanjevo, who Vlachized the entire household. Out of affection, she called my father in Vlach Radul, and she called my grandfather—her husband—Miško. Those names remained forever, and because of them, it is believed that I am of Vlach origin. But my grandfather was a pure Serb, and he married his first wife, a Serbian woman, who gave birth to my father. And as for the second wife, a Vlach woman, renaming them, that is no surprise when one knows "that a single Vlach woman is capable of Vlachizing an entire village," let alone young children. My father came to Negotin to learn a trade and stayed there.'

Military offices
| Preceded by Milojko Lešjanin | Chief of the General Staff; 1888–1890 | Succeeded by Radomir Putnik |
| Preceded by Radomir Putnik | Chief of the General Staff; 1893–1896 | Succeeded by Jovan Atanacković |
Political offices
| Preceded by Sava Grujić | Minister of Defence; 1878–1880 | Succeeded by Milojko Lešjanin |
| Preceded by Dragutin Franasović | Minister of Defence; 1896–1897 | Succeeded by Dragomir Vučković |
Academic offices
| Preceded by Sima Lozanić | President of Serbian Academy of Sciences and Arts; 1900–1903 | Succeeded by Sima Lozanić |
