= Dragutin Franasović =

Serbian army general and politician

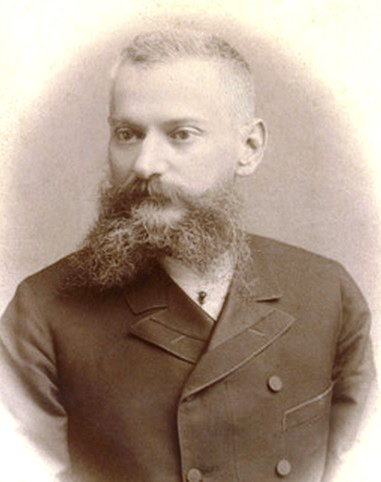
- Born: 5 December 1842; Istanbul, Ottoman Empire
- Died: 18 April 1914 (aged 71); Vienna, Austro-Hungarian Empire
- Occupation: politician

Dragutin Franasović (Serbian Cyrillic: Драгутин Франасовић), was a Serbian army general and politician who held the post of Minister of Defence and Minister of Foreign Affairs. In 1899 he succeeded General Stevan Zdravković as president of The Red Cross of Serbia, a post he held until the beginning of the Great War when Milos Borisavljevic took over. Franasović also served as the Chancellor of the Royal Orders from 1903 to 1905.

== See also ==
- Ministry of Defence
- Tihomilj Nikolić
- Milojko Lešjanin
- Đura Horvatović
- Jovan Belimarković
- Božidar Janković

Government offices
Preceded by Milutin Garašanin	Minister of Foreign Affairs; 1886–1887	Succeeded by Jovan Ristić
Preceded by Jovan Ristić	Minister of Foreign Affairs; 1887–1888	Succeeded by Čedomilj Mijatović
Preceded by Antonije Bogićević	Minister of Defence; 1893	Succeeded by Sava Grujić
Preceded by Milovan Pavlović	Minister of Defence; 1895–1896	Succeeded by Jovan Mišković
