= Chief of the Serbian General Staff =

Chief of the General Staff of the Serbian Armed Forces

Chief of the General Staff of the Serbian Armed Forces
- Начелник Генералштаба Војске Србије
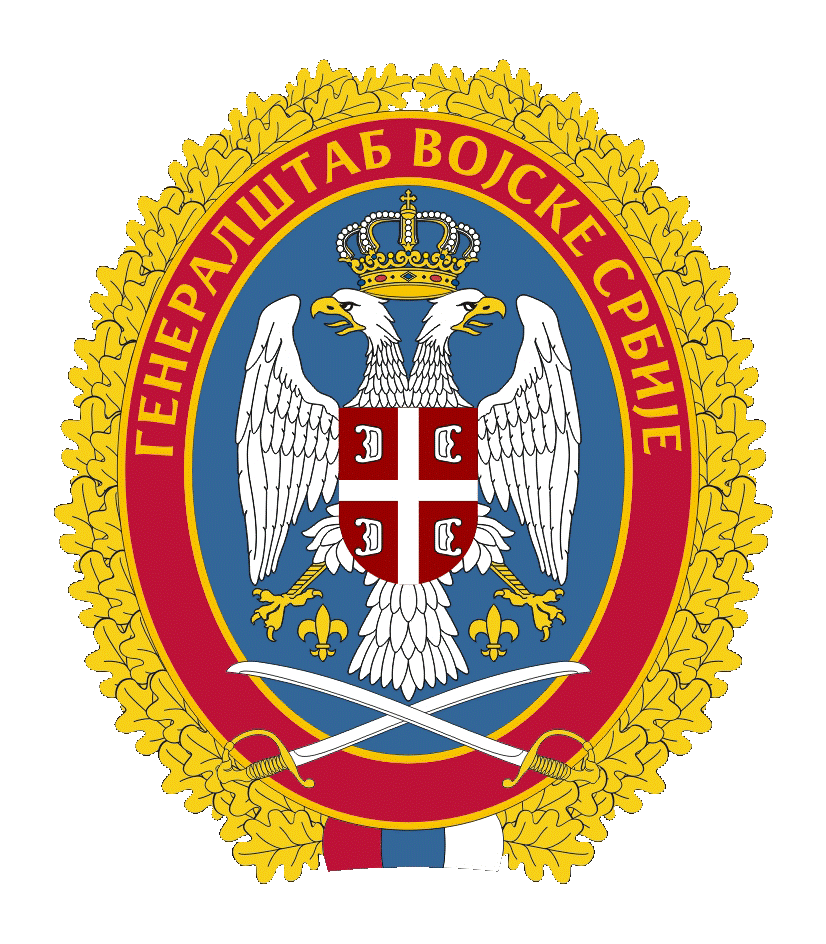

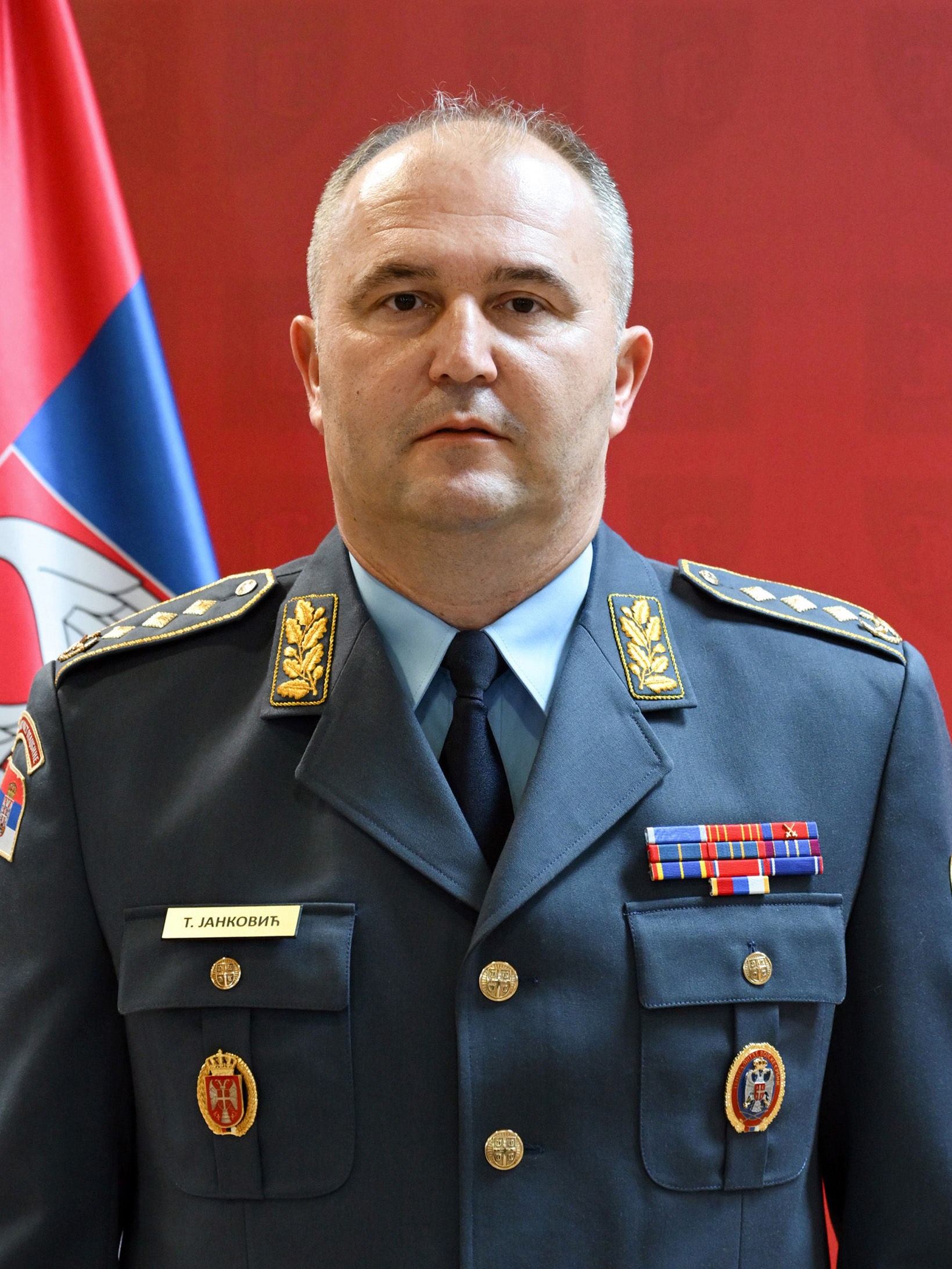
- Incumbent; Lt. Col. General Tiosav Janković; Acting since 16 November 2026
- Ministry of Defence
- Member of: General Staff
- Reports to: Minister of Defence
- Appointer: President of the Republic
- Formation: 1876; 150 years ago
- First holder: General František Zach
- Deputy: Joint Operations Commander
- Website: Official website

The Chief of the General Staff of the Serbian Armed Forces (Serbian: Начелник Генералштаба Војске Србије, romanized: Načelnik Generalštaba Vojske Srbije) is the principal head of the Serbian Armed Forces. The Chief of the Serbian General Staff is appointed by the President of the Republic, who is the commander-in-chief.

The incumbent Acting Chief of the General Staff is Lt. Col. General Tiosav Janković. He was appointed by Acting President Ana Brnabić on 16 November 2026.

The Deputy Chief of the General Staff is simultaneously the Joint Operations Commander in peacetime. The incumbent Joint Operations Commander is Lt. Col. General Tiosav Janković.

== List of chiefs of the general staff ==
=== Principality of Serbia (1876–1882) ===
No.	Portrait	Chief of the General Staff	Took office	Left office	Time in office	Commander-in-chief	Ref.
1	František Zach	General; František Zach (1807–1892)	1876	1877	0–1 years	Milan Obrenović IV	.
–	Jovan Dragašević	Lieutenant Colonel; Jovan Dragašević (1836–1915); Acting	1877	1878	0–1 years	Milan Obrenović IV	.
–	Kosta Protić	General; Kosta Protić (1831–1892); Acting	1878	1879	0–1 years	Milan Obrenović IV	.
2	Milojko Lešjanin	General; Milojko Lešjanin (1830–1896)	1879	1880	0–1 years	Milan Obrenović IV	.
–	Jovan Andjelković	General; Jovan Andjelković (1840–1885); Acting	1880	1882	1–2 years	Milan Obrenović IV	.

=== Kingdom of Serbia (1882–1918) ===
No.	Portrait	Chief of the General Staff	Took office	Left office	Time in office	Commander-in-chief	Ref.
(2)	Milojko Lešjanin	General; Milojko Lešjanin (1830–1896)	1882	1885	2–3 years	Milan I	.
(2)	Milojko Lešjanin	General; Milojko Lešjanin (1830–1896)	1886	1888	1–2 years	Milan I	.
3	Jovan Mišković	General; Jovan Mišković (1844–1908)	1888	1890	1–2 years	Milan I Alexander I	.
–	Radomir Putnik	Colonel; Radomir Putnik (1847–1917); Acting	1890	1892	1–2 years	Alexander I	.
(3)	Jovan Mišković	General; Jovan Mišković (1844–1908)	1893	1896	2–3 years	Alexander I	.
–	Jovan Atanacković	General; Jovan Atanacković (1848–1921); Acting	1897	1898	0–1 years	Alexander I	.
4	Dimitrije Cincar-Marković	General; Dimitrije Cincar-Marković (1849–1903)	1901	1902	0–1 years	Alexander I	.
–	Svetozar T. Nešić	Colonel; Svetozar T. Nešić (1851–1927); Acting	1902	1903	0–1 years	Alexander I	.
5	Radomir Putnik	General; Radomir Putnik (1847–1917)	1903	1904	0–1 years	Peter I	.
–	Živojin Mišić	Colonel; Živojin Mišić (1855–1921); Acting	1904	1904	0 years	Peter I	.
(5)	Radomir Putnik	General; Radomir Putnik (1847–1917)	1904	1905	0–1 years	Peter I	.
–	Aleksandar Mašin	Colonel; Aleksandar Mašin (1857–1910); Acting	1905	1906	0–1 years	Peter I	.
–	Petar Bojović	Colonel; Petar Bojović (1858–1945); Acting	1906	1908	1–2 years	Peter I	.
(5)	Radomir Putnik	Field Marshal; Radomir Putnik (1847–1917) (Note: General when appointed. Field Marshal since 20 October 1912.)	1908	8 December 1915	6–7 years	Peter I	.
–	Petar Bojović	General; Petar Bojović (1858–1945); Acting	8 December 1915	1916	0–1 years	Peter I	.
6	Petar Bojović	General; Petar Bojović (1858–1945)	1916	1 July 1918	1–2 years	Peter I	.
7	Živojin Mišić	Field Marshal; Živojin Mišić (1855–1921) (Note: Continued as Chief of the General Staff of Yugoslavia.)	1 July 1918	1 December 1918	153 days	Peter I	.

=== Republic of Serbia (2006–present) ===
No.	Portrait	Chief of the General Staff	Took office	Left office	Time in office	Defence branch	Commander-in-chief	Ref.
8	Zdravko Ponoš	Lt. Col. General; Zdravko Ponoš (born 1962) (Note: Dismissed by President Boris Tadić over dispute with Minister of Defence, Dragan Šutanovac.)	4 June 2006	30 December 2008	2 years, 209 days	Serbian Army	Boris Tadić	.
–	Miloje Miletić	Lt. Col. General; Miloje Miletić (born 1953); Acting	30 December 2008	15 February 2009	47 days	Serbian Army	Boris Tadić	.
9	Miloje Miletić	General; Miloje Miletić (born 1953)	15 February 2009	12 December 2011	2 years, 300 days	Serbian Army	Boris Tadić	.
10	Ljubiša Diković	General; Ljubiša Diković (born 1960) (Note: Lt. Col. General when appointed. General since 13 February 2013.)	12 December 2011	14 September 2018	6 years, 276 days	Serbian Army	Boris Tadić; Tomislav Nikolić; Aleksandar Vučić	.
11	Milan Mojsilović	General; Milan Mojsilović (born 1967) (Note: Lt. Col. General when appointed. General since 23 April 2019.)	14 September 2018	16 November 2026 (Note: The decree on retiring Mojsilović and appointing Janković was issued by Ana Brnabić, then President of the National Assembly and Acting President of the Republic.)	8 years, 63 days	Serbian Army	Aleksandar Vučić	
–	Tiosav Janković [sr]	Lt. Col. General; Tiosav Janković (born 1974); Acting	16 November 2026	Incumbent	6 days	Serbian Air Force and Air Defence	Vacant (Note: Since 19 november 2026 Aleksandar Čupić is President of the National Assembly and Acting President of the Republic.)	.

== Sources ==
- Chief of the General Staff: 1876–2000, Ivetić Velimir, Belgrade 2000.
