= Đura Horvatović =

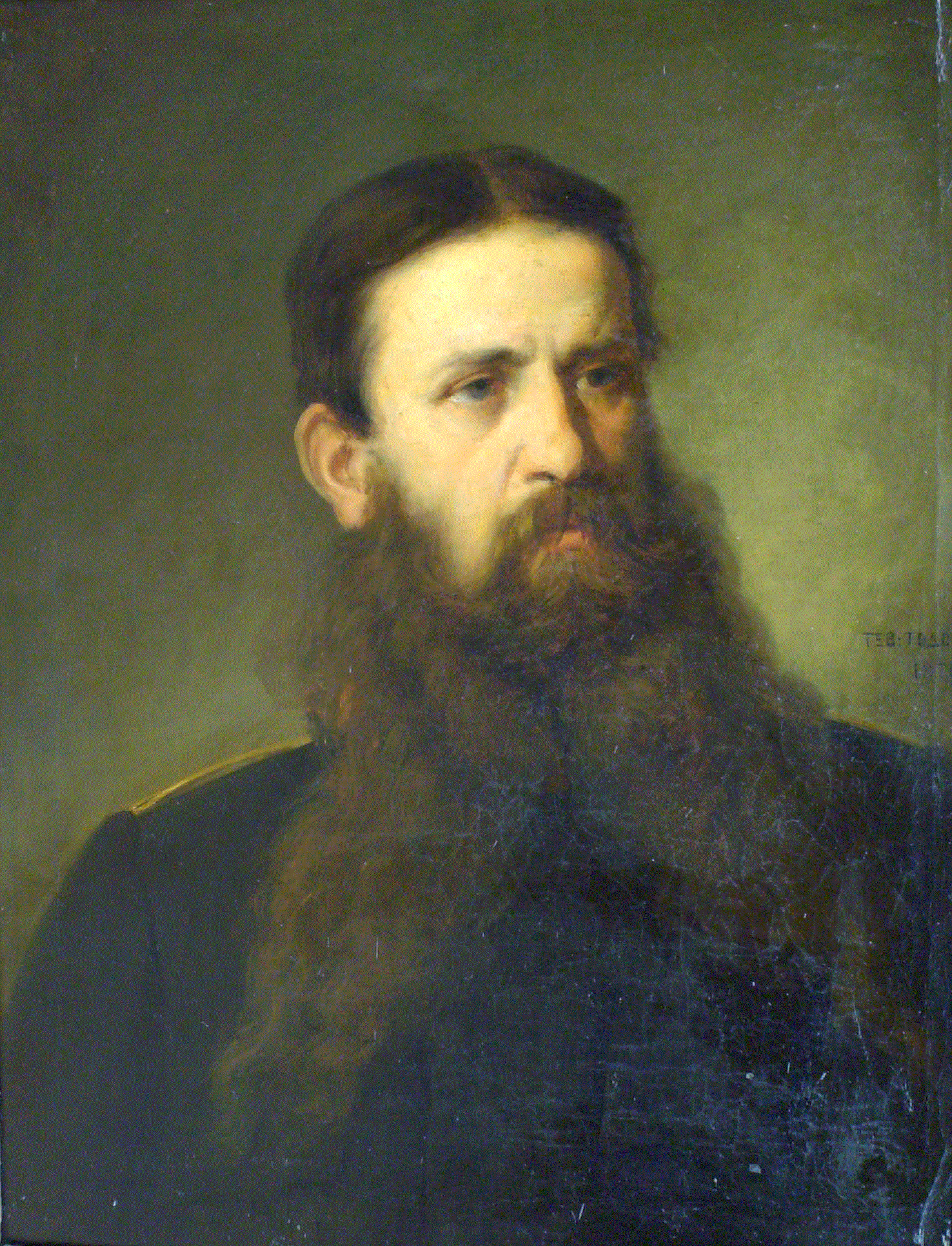
- General Đura Horvatović, artwork by Stevan Todorović
- Born: 17 January 1835; Svinjar, Slavonia, Austria (today Davor, Croatia)
- Died: 12 March 1895 (aged 60) Belgrade, Serbia
- Allegiance: Principality of Serbia; Kingdom of Serbia
- Rank: General
- Conflicts: Serbo–Turkish wars

Đorđe "Đura" Horvatović (Serbian Cyrillic: Ђорђе "Ђура" Хорватовић; 17 January 1835 – 12 March [O.S. 28 February] 1895) was a Serbian general and military minister.

Horvatović was born in Svinjar, Croatia, then part of Austria-Hungary and today Davor, right on the border river with Bosnia. His father Stjepan (Stephanus) was lieutenant in nearby Nova Gradiška, a town founded as outpost in the Military Frontier.

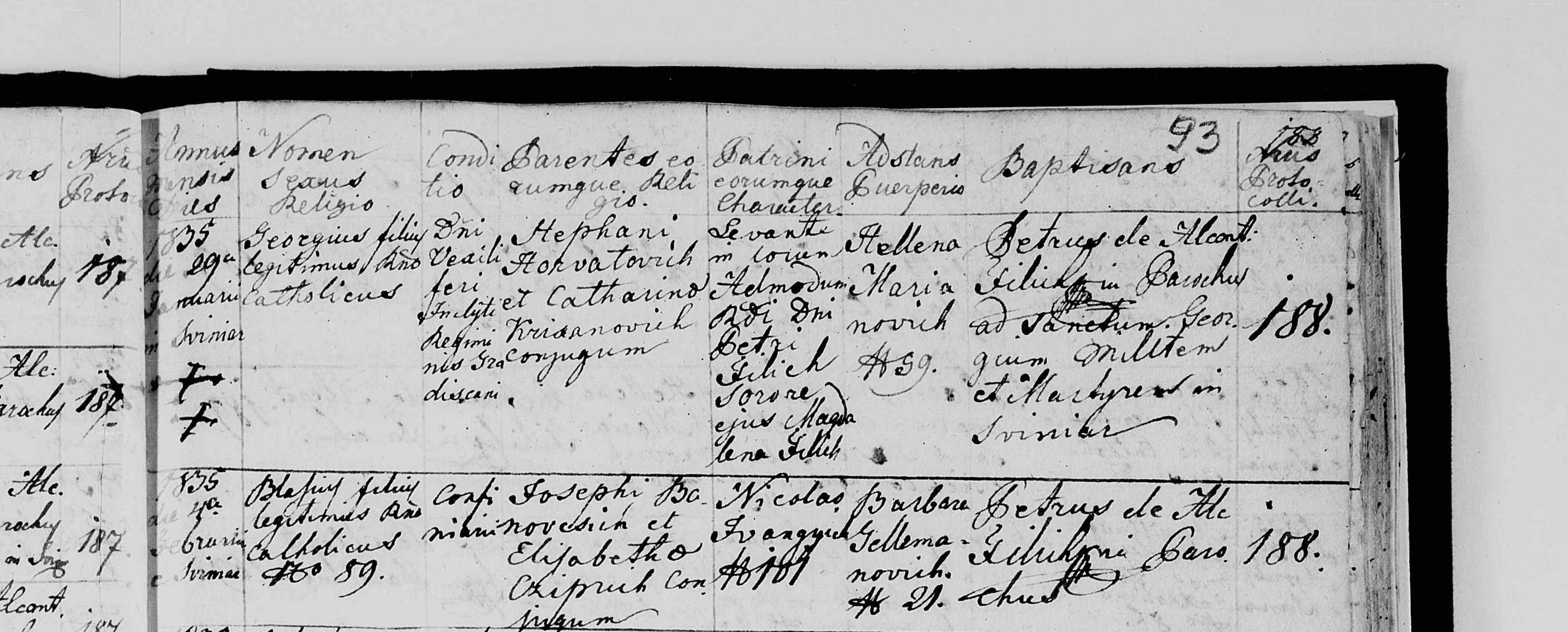
Baptism entry for Đura Horvatović 1835

His baptism record shows that he was Catholic which indicates Croatian ethnicity. His father's roots are in Lika.

From the Austrian army with the rank of lieutenant, he joined the Serbian Army in 1862. He distinguished himself in the First Serbian-Ottoman War (1876-1877), in which he commanded as a lieutenant colonel of the Knjaževac army. He was promoted to colonel and took command of the 4th Corps, whose part in the Battle of Šumatovac attacked the right flank of the Turkish army and contributed to the victory of the Serbian army.

In the Second Serbian-Turkish War 1877–1878, he commanded the corps of Timok, with which on 24 December 1877 took Bela Palanka. Four days later in conjunction with the Šumadija corps, he took Pirot as well.

From 1881 to 1885 he was a deputy in St. Petersburg, then commander of the active Army and its Minister (1886–1887).

== See also ==
- Mihailo Ilić
- Ranko Alimpić
- Milojko Lešjanin
- Mikhail Chernyayev
- Nićifor Dučić
- František Zach
- Kosta Protić
- Sava Grujić
- Jovan Ristić
- Jovan Belimarković

Government offices
Preceded by Dragutin Filipović	Minister of Defence; 1886–1887	Succeeded by Petar Topalović
