= Svetozar T. Nešić =

Serbian general

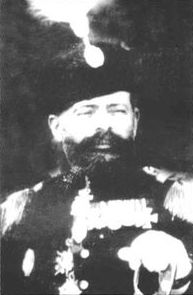
Svetozar T. Nešić

Svetozar T. Nešić (12 November 1851 – 1927) was a general staff colonel of the Royal Serbian Army. In the period from 1902 to 1903. He was the acting Chief of the Serbian General Staff from 1902 to 1903.

== Biography ==
Svetozar T. Nešić was born in Negotin on 12 November 1851. He attended elementary school in his hometown and afterwards graduated from Gymnasium in Zaječar and Belgrade's Velika škola before he enrolled in the Artillery School of the Military Academy in 1869. He graduated from there in 1874, when he was promoted to the rank of artillery lieutenant. In 1885, he was transferred to the General Staff profession, and he pursued further military studies at the Military Academy, also graduating from there.

During his career, he performed the following important functions:

- Chief of Staff of the Krajina Brigade (in the wars of 1876 and 1877–1878)
- v. d. Chief of Staff of the Timok Division in the Great War
- Member of the Serbian General Staff
- King of Milan's ordinance officer
- clerk in the Operations Department of the Supreme Command (1885)
- military envoy to Constantinople
- Commander of the Fourteenth Infantry Regiment
- Chief of the Operational Department of the Staff of the Active Army Command and at the same time c. d. Chief of Staff
- Professor at the Higher School of the Military Academy (1894 - 1899 and 1900 - 1903)
- Chief of the Historical Department of the General Staff (1897 and 1901)

He was acting Chief of the General Staff from 1902 to 1903. In this capacity, in 1903, he drafted the Rule and Plan for the Mobilization of the Whole Army and the Arrangement of the Background to the Eastern and Southern Forts, as well as the War Plan for the War with Turkey, which coincided in all respects with the implemented plan from 1912. Due to illness, he retired at his own request in 1905.

As a military writer, he published several works, mostly in the magazine Ratnik, as well as six books, of which Izdavanje zapovesti from 1899 remained notable.

== Decorations and awards ==
He was awarded the following:

- Order of the Cross of Takovo with Swords of the fifth degree,
- Order of the Cross of Takovo of the second degree,
- The Royal Order of the White Eagle of the third degree,
- The Order of Miloš the Great of the fourth degree,
- The Silver Medal for Bravery,
- The Gold Medal for Zealous Service in Wars,
- The Medal for Military Virtues,
- The Memorials of the Serbian-Turkish Wars of 1876, 1877-1878 and the Serbo-Bulgarian War of 1885,
- The Monument to King Peter the First and
- The Guards Monument.

== Sources ==
- Ivetić, Velimir (2000). Načelnici Generalštaba 1876-2000 [Chiefs of the General Staff] (in Serbian). Beograd: Novinsko-informativni centar VOJSKA.
