= Sava Grujić =

Serbian statesman and military leader (1840–1913)

General Sava Grujić
- Сава Грујић
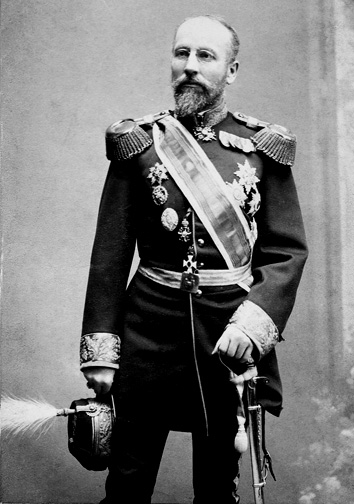
- General Sava Grujić

Prime Minister of the Kingdom of Serbia
- In office 1 January 1888 – 27 April 1888
- Monarch: Alexander I
- Preceded by: Jovan Ristić
- Succeeded by: Nikola Hristić
- In office 7 March 1889 – 23 February 1891
- Monarch: Alexander I
- Preceded by: Kosta Protić
- Succeeded by: Nikola Pašić
- In office 5 December 1893 – 24 January 1894
- Monarch: Alexander I
- Preceded by: Lazar Dokić
- Succeeded by: Đorđe Simić
- In office 4 October 1903 – 10 December 1904
- Monarch: Peter I
- Preceded by: Jovan Avakumović
- Succeeded by: Nikola Pašić
- In office 7 March 1906 – 29 April 1906
- Monarch: Peter I
- Preceded by: Ljubomir Stojanović
- Succeeded by: Nikola Pašić
Ministerial offices 1876–1894
Minister of War of the Principality of Serbia
In office 4 November 1876 – 1 October 1878
Monarch	Milan I
Prime Minister	Stevča Mihailović; Ljubomir Kaljević
Preceded by	Tihomilj Nikolić
Succeeded by	Jovan Mišković
Minister of War of the Kingdom of Serbia
In office 5 July 1887 – 14 April 1888
Monarch	Milan I
Prime Minister	Jovan Ristić
Preceded by	Antonije Bogićević
Succeeded by	Kosta Protić
In office 16 March 1890 – 11 February 1891
Monarch	Alexander I
Prime Minister	Himself
Preceded by	Dimitrije Đurić
Succeeded by	Radovan Miletić
In office 4 June 1893 – 12 January 1894
Monarch	Alexander I
Prime Minister	Lazar Dokić; Himself
Preceded by	Dragutin Franasović
Succeeded by	Milovan Pavlović
In office 1 March 1906 – 17 April 1906
Monarch	Peter I
Prime Minister	Himself
Preceded by	Vasilije Antonić
Succeeded by	Radomir Putnik
Minister of Foreign Affairs of Kingdom of Serbia
In office 7 March 1889 – 23 February 1891
Monarch	Alexander I
Prime Minister	Himself
Preceded by	Čedomilj Mijatović
Succeeded by	Mihailo Djordjević
In office 5 December 1893 – 24 January 1894
Monarch	Alexander I
Prime Minister	Himself
Preceded by	Andra Nikolić
Succeeded by	Đorđe Simić

Personal details
- Born: 25 November 1840: Kolari; Principality of Serbia
- Died: 3 November 1913 (aged 72) Belgrade, Kingdom of Serbia
- Party: People's Radical Party
- Spouses: Milica Magazinović; Milica Radovenović
- Children: 5
- Education: Serbian Military Academy; Prussian Staff College; Mikhailovskaya Military Artillery Academy
- Profession: Politician, and military officer

Military service
- Allegiance: Principality of Serbia; Kingdom of Serbia
- Branch/service: National Army; Royal Serbian Army
- Years of service: 1864–1878
- Rank: General
- Commands: Artillery Commander
- Battles/wars: Serbo-Turkish War

Sava Grujić (Serbian Cyrillic: Сава Грујић, pronounced [sâvə grooit͜ɕ]; 25 November 1840 – 3 November 1913) was a Serbian politician, statesman, general, army officer, and author, serving five times as Prime Minister of the Kingdom of Serbia under two different monarchs from 1887 to 1906.

As an officer Grujić participated in both Serbian-Ottoman Wars (1876–77; 1877–78) which lead to Serbia's full independence from the Ottoman Empire; a military strategist he drafted the war plan before becoming Minister of War carrying out reforms of the military strengthening Serbia's national army before her victory against the Ottomans. Brave and resourceful on the battlefield, he was also a gifted diplomat, advocating the interests of his country in the courtyards of Europe, Russia, and Turkey. During his diplomatic career he was Serbia's representative to the Russian Empire, Serbian Deputy in Constantinople, Serbia's representative to Bulgaria and Serbian Deputy in Athens before serving as minister for foreign affairs. During the conflict between Russia, Turkey, and Austria, Grujić was sent as a special envoy to Constantinople to negotiate with the Turks on behalf of the Russian Empire.

A skilled politician, Grujić was one of the leaders of the People's Radical Party serving as prime minister, Minister of Defence, Minister of Foreign Affairs several times between 1876 and 1910 in the Governments of both Karađorđević and Obrenović. As chairman of the first radical Council of Ministers, he oversaw the introduction of a new constitution, redefining a more democratic and liberal Serbian society. He headed the Serbian delegation at the Second Peace Conference which led to the signing of the Hague Convention 1907. An honorary member of the Serbian Academy of Sciences and Arts, he wrote many books about diplomacy military organisation and war, some of them still in use today. Grujić was considered one of the builders of Yugoslavia and played an instrumental role in its creation. He was an able negotiator and diplomat and with some of his contemporaries put together ideas for the formation of a south Slav state working together with prominent liberals of his day.

== Early life and education ==
Sava Grujić was born on 25 November 1840 in Kolari, a village in the district of Smederevo, just ten years after Serbia became a semi-independent principality after three and a half centuries of Turkish occupation. His paternal grandfather was Gruja Ilić, brother and aide-de-camp of Vule Ilić, a well-known Vojvoda (military commander) who distinguished himself at the battle of Suvobor and at the siege of Belgrade during the First Serbian Uprising.

Sava's childhood was full of stories in which the best and boldest men were relentlessly carrying the guerrilla war against the nation's oppressor dreaming of freeing the Serb lands from Turkish rule once and for all. Once he finished his elementary education at the local school, an Orthodox priest and a local public official recognising Grujić's potential, arranged for him to go to Belgrade for secondary education.

== Early military career ==
=== Officer cadet and lieutenant ===
In 1856 Grujić attended the Serbian Military Academy in Belgrade, the academy known at that time as the Artillery School had been established only 6 years before, was the first military educational institution in Serbia, it contained a military high school, offering secondary level education, and a school of national defence, which conducted officer training, the main military subjects at the Artillery School, and later at the Military Academy, were taught by Prussian instructorship education lasted until 1861.

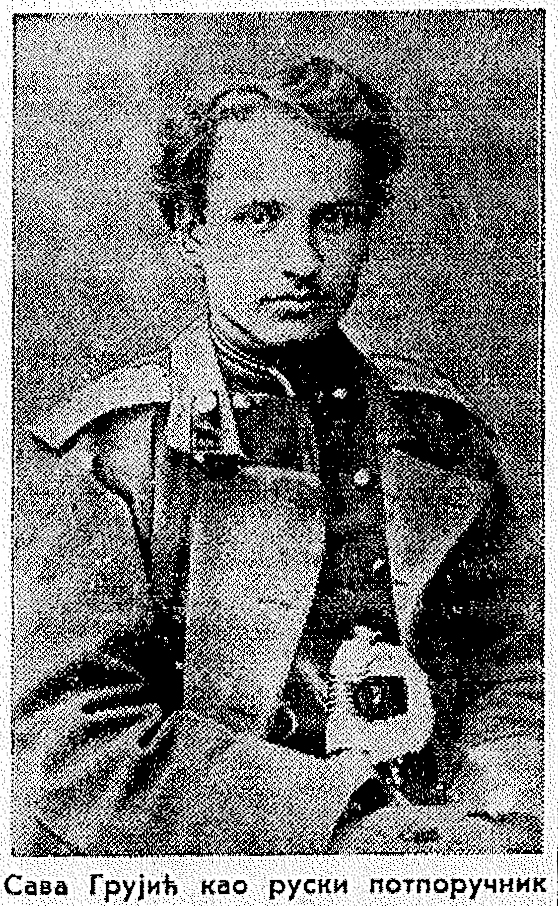
Second Lieutenant Grujić Imperial Russian Army

Upon graduation, he was commissioned as second lieutenant of artillery and as top graduate entered the Kriegsakademie (also known as the Prussian War College) in Berlin to continue his military education and for the practical study of artillery; at the time the academy was the highest military facility of the Kingdom of Prussia to educate, train, and develop general staff officers. Grujić graduated in December 1864, wanting to get a higher theoretical artillery formation, Grujić left Prussia to serve in the Imperial Russian Army, he entered service with the 23rd Artillery Brigade in St Petersburg. While serving with the 23rd Brigade, wishing to achieve a high-level specialisation, Grujić applied then was admitted at the Mikhailovsky Artillery Academy in 1865, the academy prepared officers to become battery commanders, at the time Russian artillerists were the first in the world to develop methods of gunfire from closed fire position.

At the time Russia was going through reforms in the artillery under Minister of War General-Adjutant Dmitrii Miliutin, one of the chief tasks set for the Main Artillery Administration was to organise the production of all kinds of artillery armament, ammunition, artillery instruments and other things for artillery provision. General Adjutant Aleksandr Barantsov, first Chief of the Main Artillery Administration, was responsible for the technical improvement of the artillery materiel, arrangement of artillery education and all measures in the artillery organisation. This would be a very valuable experience for Grujić when, a few years later, he would start reforming the Serbian Army.

Grujić spent the last two years of his training in Russia at St. Petersburg's arsenal. Grujić returned to Serbia in 1870 after graduation, he was promoted to captain and appointed first Director of the state arsenal in Kragujevac as an expert in artillery and armaments and then later chief of artillery control. Kragujevac was Serbia's main centre for arms production and modernisation of armaments, the Kragujevac arms factory was the largest industrial establishment in the principality.

== Political education ==
=== Liberal nationalism and Slavic unity ===
In 1861, Grujić was in Prussia studying at the Military Academy when the January Uprising broke out in the Russian sector of partitioned Poland. Inspired by romantic and revolutionary nationalism that was sweeping across Europe at the time, Sava Grujić traveled to Poland and joined the rebellion. Grujić fought alongside fellow Serbian volunteer Jevrem Marković, another graduate from the Belgrade Military Academy who had also been sent to Prussia to study (training as a cavalry officer). After the failure of the Uprising, Grujić returned to St. Petersburg and was allowed to return to his studies while Jevrem Marković returned to Belgrade

Back in Russia, Grujić participated actively in the founding of Srpska Opština ("Serbian Commune"). Dimitrije Đurić, another artillery officer, was president, Grujić was vice-president. and Jevrem Marković's older brother and notorious radical-socialist Svetozar Marković was secretary. The stated goal of the Commune was "the establishment of fraternal relations among all Serbs in Russia", with a view to cooperation for the "general progress" of the Serbian people and nation. They were also inspired by Omladina ("Youth"), a Serbian youth organisation whose members called for the formation of a Pan-Serb youth movement, a constitutional monarchy for Serbia, and even a Balkan Republic.

After seven years in Russia, Grujić returned to Serbia in 1871 to manage the Kragujevac arms factory. He joined a secret revolutionary society called the Main Board for Serb Liberation based in Kragujevac and founded by members of Omladina. The Main Board sought the liberation and unification of all Serb-inhabited territory in the Ottoman Empire. Grujić and his group started the Associated Printing Press of Kragujevac.

=== From Socialism to Radicalism ===
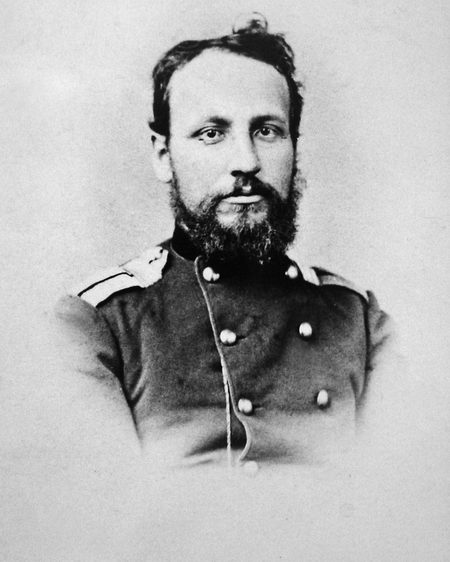
Captain Sava Grujić c. 1871

Under the chairmanship of Captain Sava Grujić and the editorship of Svetozar Marković who joined them, the group started a newspaper called Javnost ("The Public"). Marković was the "paid and responsible" editor and the Associated Printing Press of Kragujevac the publisher. In a very short time what was being advertised as Serbia's second socialist newspaper was out discussing current political issues Aa major theme of Javnost was the fight for freedom of the press.

The first issue of the newspaper appeared on 8 November 1873, discussing the multitude of political and economic problems which confronted Serbia: peasant indebtedness and bankruptcy, usury, bureaucratic corruption, and the strangling of the zadruga and opština by the oppressive police regime. Javnost promised to work for the elimination of such evils by "educating public opinion, giving it a scientific direction, and creating out of public opinion a force which will have a strong influence on the solution of all problems concerning our national life."

Frustrated by the state of Serbian politics, Javnost published an article openly criticising the government and stating that the Serbian people "have the right to overthrow a prince with whom they were dissatisfied." As a result, in December 1873 the Minister of War Kosta Protić ordered the dismissal of Captain Grujić from the service, citing his "treacherous" association with Javnost and the Associated Printing Press of Kragujevac. Svetozar Marković was arrested, charged with defaming the prince and sentenced to nine months in jail. Grujić was temporarily retired from the service.

== Serbian Wars of Independence ==
In July 1875, peasants in Herzegovina rebelled against their Turkish landlords and rulers. The insurrection quickly spread to Bosnia and aroused belligerent sentiment in Serbia, still an autonomous principality within the Ottoman Empire. Prince Milan unable to resist the pressure, eventually decides to declare war. On 28 June 1876, the day of the Battle of Kosovo, Serbia declares war on the Ottoman Empire, at the time Serbia's armed force was an army of a militant type with outdated weapons and without proper military service, but it was, however, a regular military force, facing them the Turkish empire with over 50 million inhabitants had an experienced army equipped with modern weapons and equipment.

=== Major Grujić's War Plan ===
The War Council gathered in the early stage had to decide on a strategy and where to engage the enemy first. Two courses of action were proposed one by Major Dimitrije Djurić and one by Major Sava Grujić, both officers having done their training in Russia together previously. Major Dimitrije Djurić proposed that the majority of the army should be engaged towards Bosnia and Raška while Grujić suggested towards the southeast and Niš, where the Turks were expected to be concentrating the bulk of their forces. The Council meeting took place on 15 May 1876, both proposals were considered.

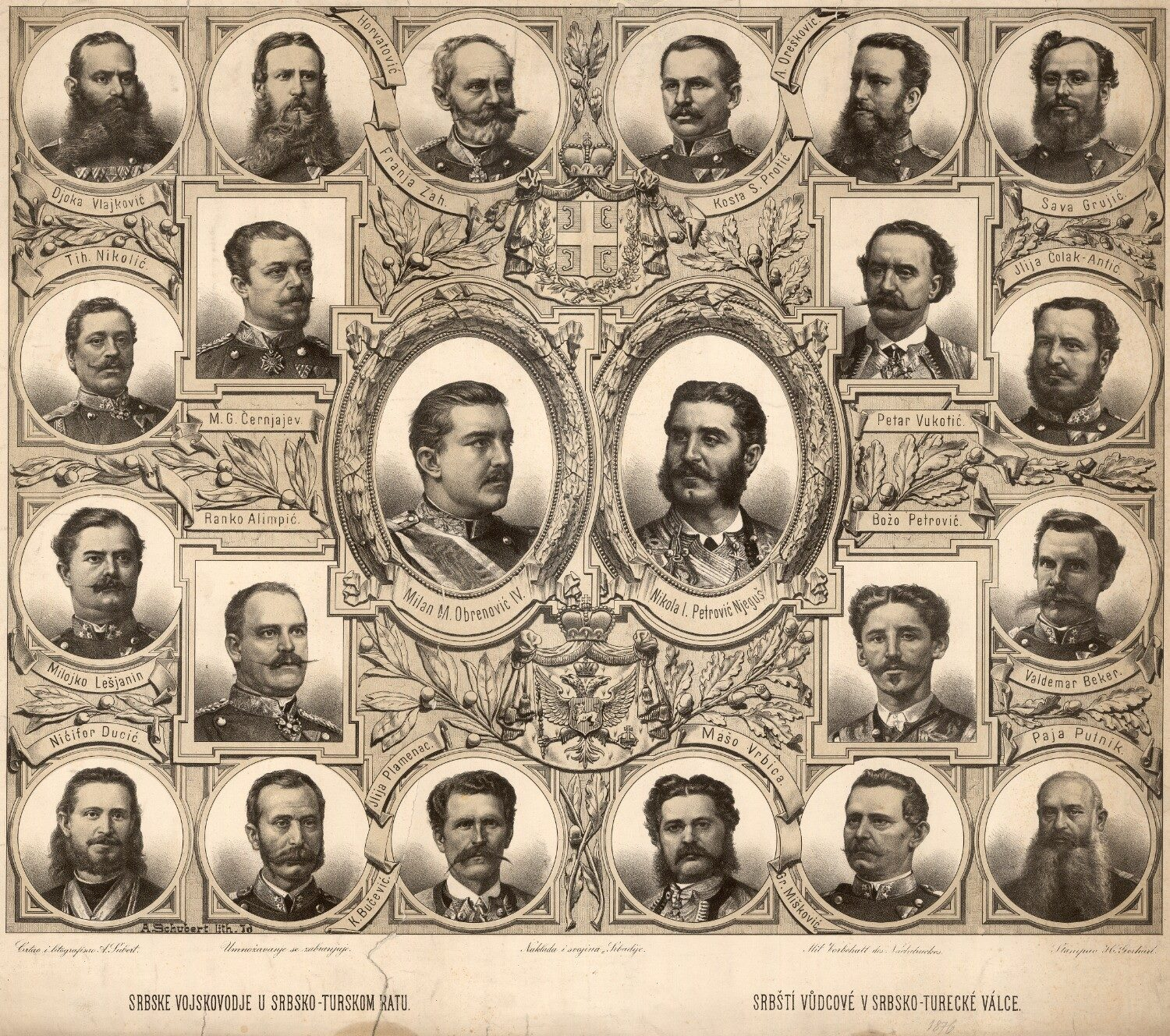
The Serbian Commanders of the First Serbian-Turkish War. Sava Grujić is in the top right corner.

Grujić's proposal was chosen, based on the strategic principle that by moving swiftly into position Serbia could concentrate the bulk of her forces and move offensively against the main Turkish contingent before it had a chance to organise its troops and this way win a decisive battle. The primary objective of this plan was the total destruction of the enemy's army.

To follow Grujić's plan it was thus decided to concentrate most of the army in the Moravian region, then make use of the superior mobilisation and motivation of the Serbian army given the known slowness in mobilisation and concentration of the Turkish army, its outdated tactics and the lack of motivation of Turkish soldiers. At the request of the Serbian government, the war operational plan of Major Grujić was changed at the last moment and Instead of the offensive on the Moravian border, it was decided to launch multiple attacks on all fronts. Orders were sent to redirect troops already in motion according to the previously adopted plan.

=== Artillery Commander ===
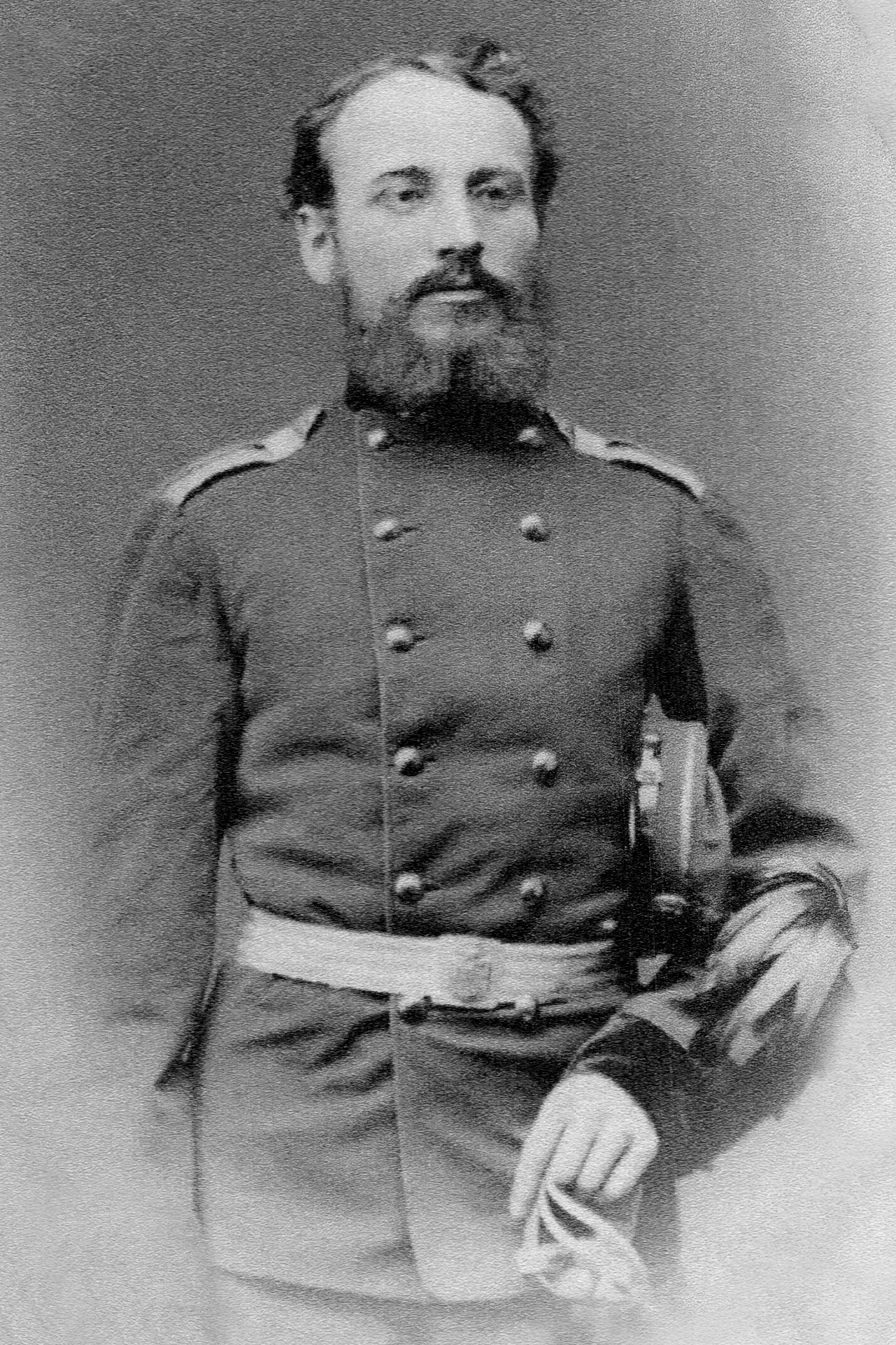
Artillery Commander Major Sava Grujić

Sava Grujić was appointed Artillery Commander serving under General Mikhail Chernyayev, a Russian who took Serbian citizenship. Leading a Serbo Russian army against the Turks, Chernyayev embodied according to historian David MacKenzie "the Panslav ideal of selfless service to Slav Christians groaning under the Ottoman yoke". Grujić recommended that Chernyayev be retained merely in an advisory capacity and insisted of not giving him active command. twenty two-year old Prince Milan, who had great faith in Chernyayev, decided instead to name Chernyayev "commander-in-chief of all Serbo-Russian forces on the eastern front".

As Artillery Commander Grujić took a leading part in the battles and was instrumental in the Serbian Army's efforts and achievements throughout the War, by the end of 1876 he was promoted to the rank of Colonel.

Contrary to Serbia's expectations Russia did not officially enter the war and the changes made in the operational plan, especially abandoning the Grujić's war plan, disrupted the entire war concept of the Serbian General Staff. Chernyayev's insistence on continuing attacks on Turkish fortified positions after the failure of his opening offensive was a contributory cause of defeat. This was the main cause of the unsuccessful attacks by the Serbian army on Niš, Drina, and Ibarska. On 31 October 1876 Russia finally presents an ultimatum to the Turks and force them to conclude an armistice.

== Minister of War ==
=== A professional army ===
On 4 November 1876, at a critical moment for the Principality, Colonel Sava Grujić is appointed Minister of War in the Cabinet of Stevča Mihailović; On 24 April 1877, Russia declares war on the Ottoman Empire and on 13 December is joined by Serbia and by Montenegro, the conflict is known as the Russo-Turkish War.

Sava Grujić started to reorganise the Serbian army using the Prussian experience from the Napoleonic wars: he increased garrison troops from four to eight battalions and ordered that every one of the thirty-two companies of garrison troops became a part of one battalion of National Militia to augment the fighting power of the latter. In August 1877, a new army force structure was established that introduced five active and one reserve army corps instead of the earlier four corps mode. For the next two years, Sava Grujić organised more major reforms in the army, improving her fighting capacity and giving her a new organisation, Grujić realised that it was necessary to stiffen the back of the Serbian militia, so he split the standing army, which had seen little action during the first war, into smaller units that acted as cadres for the larger units of the militia. The troops were led by capable Serbian officers who proved their heroism and tactical ability, one of them was Jevrem Marković with whom Sava had fought alongside in Poland in 1863. In 1876 King Milan had kept the standing army out of combat, fearing to commit the troops he saw primarily as protection for his dynasty, but Grujić reorganisation turned it into the backbone of a considerably improved Serbian fighting force.

=== Congress of Berlin ===
By early 1878, the Royal Serbian Army had captured most of the South Morava basin, liberating Vranje and Leskovac, reaching as far as Preševo, Vitina, and the monastery of Gračanica near Priština in Kosovo, revered by romantic nationalists as the seat of the medieval Serbian Empire.

The Sultan sued for peace, on 3 March 1878 a peace treaty was signed between Russia and the Ottoman Empire at San Stefano, a village west of Istanbul; Serbia became independent according to Article 3. The formal independence of Serbia from the Ottoman Empire is internationally recognised at the Congress of Berlin on 13 July 1878, however, the new treaty significantly changes the terms of the Treaty of San Stefano; Serbia's territory gain is reduced and Austria-Hungary is given a mandate to occupy and administrate Bosnia and Herzegovina. This marked the start of Sava Grujić's diplomatic career.

== Diplomatic service 1878–1887 ==
Grujić quickly proved himself to be a versatile politician and a skilled diplomat, as such he was sent as ambassador and representative of the Serbian Kingdom around Capitals helping secure Serbia's place in Europe. A few years later he became Minister for Foreign Affairs. In 1879, as foreign relations between the Principality of Bulgaria and Serbia are established for the first time, Grujić is sent to Bulgaria as the first diplomatic representative of Serbia.

From 1882 to 1884, he moved to Athens where he was posted as Serbian Minister of the new Kingdom of Serbia. A reformer named Charilaos Trikoupis, having just been elected Prime Minister, was pushing through an aggressive program of reforms to make Greece into a progressive nation, Sava was involved into many negotiations between their respective governments and the Ottoman Porte.

From 1885 to 1887 he became Serbia's representative to the Russian Empire and moved his family to Saint Petersburg. In 1887 Sava Grujić is promoted general. As a trusted political friend of Russia, he is sent as a special envoy to Constantinople, during the conflict between Russia, Turkey, and Austria, to negotiate with the Turks on behalf of the Russian Empire.

== Political career 1887–1894 ==
=== People's Radical Party ===
After first leaning towards the liberal party, Sava Grujić joined the People's Radical Party under the leadership of Nikola Pašić. The Radical Party was formed in 1881 and its ideological origins could be traced to the socialist program of Svetozar Marković that Grujić was familiar with from his time in Russia, especially Marković's ideas of people's state and people's sovereignty. At the time there had been no political parties in Serbia with written programs and organisational structure, only the progressive party had been legally recognised as a political party. The program of the Radical Party was based on major democratic changes in Serbia and the liberation and union of all Serbs. The Radicals insisted on a constitutional reform which implied that all legislative power was the responsibility of the National Assembly and that the country should be organised on the principle of local self-government. By mobilising the peasantry through organising the countryside, the Radical Party was the first to understand the huge political potential of the peasants, because of that the Radicals proved to be "the most original nineteenth-century Balkan political movement"'.

In January 1881, the radical newspaper called "Self-Government" (samouprava) came out with the program of the party. From that moment that the Radicals diverged from the socialist ideas of Svetozar Marković, but insisted on political, rather than economic or social issues. Critical of the monarchy and inspired by French ideas of Radicalism, the Radicals demanded democracy, public liberties, and liberal reforms. In foreign policy, they were strongly Pro-Russian, anti-Austrian and Francophile, which made conflicts with pro-Austrian Prince Milan unavoidable.

=== First Coalition government ===
In June 1887 for the first time in history, the People's Radical Party enters the cabinet, as one of their leader Grujić became Minister of Defence from 17 July, in a coalition government under the Presidency of the Liberal Jovan Ristić. The new government was greeted with great enthusiasm by wide masses. Slobodan Jovanović says that the capital was "overwhelmed" with local party champions who came to congratulate their ministers on coming to power.

Grujić and the Radicals’ first success was the agreement they concluded with the Liberals in the spring of 1886. This agreement was motivated by two important factors: The necessity of legalising the Radical movement after the Timok rebellion affair and the chance of entering the government. This was possible only through an agreement with the opposition party of the Liberals. The Radical-Liberal agreement did not signal any ideological rapprochement between the two political groups. It rather was directed towards collaboration during the elections and, in case of electoral victory, the possibility of forming a coalition government. The major task of that coalition cabinet was to foster constitutional reform. After several months, on 19 December 1887, the Radicals formed the first purely Radical cabinet under the presidency of General Sava Grujić but the conflict with the King soon escalated.

=== Presidency and the Constitution of 1888 ===
On 19 December 1887, the Radicals formed the first purely Radical cabinet under the presidency of General Sava Grujić. The first pure radical government in the history of the Radical Party was formed on 31 December 1887. Sava Grujić became Prime Minister and Minister of the Army, his first act was the promulgation of a new Constitution in December 1888 establishing parliamentary democracy, freedom of citizens and local self-government. Although the Constitution came as a result of the work of all three political parties, its spirit basically reflected the program of Grujić Radical Party. It was one of the most liberal constitutions in Europe of that time, establishing the basis for full democracy and opening the door for the development of an advanced political system in Serbia. It was based on the liberal Constitution of Belgium, itself a slightly modified version of the French Charte of 1830.

The 1888 Constitution did not formally proclaim the sovereignty of the people, because King Milan Obrenović expressly opposed the principle, but it limited royal powers considerably and, by lowering the electoral census threshold, practically introduced universal suffrage. Endorsed by five-sixths of the Radical votes at the Great National Assembly (Velika narodna skupština), the 1888 Constitution, despite reservations of some Radical representatives, was seen as providing for a transition to a parliamentary system, which had already been demanded by the St Andrew's Day Assembly (which overthrew Prince Alexander Karađorđević) in 1858.

If the failure of the Timok rebellion was the King's victory over the Radicals, then the promulgation of the new Constitution was the Radical victory over the ruler. In accordance with the agreement reached, King Milan informed the Prime Minister Colonel Sava Grujić, in a letter dated 3 January 1888, that he had made the decision to allow free emigrants to return to the country, except for Nikola Pašić. Nikola Pašić was not even pardoned this time "because of the treacherous preparations against the fatherland and Serbian thought in the autumn of 1885."

The Radical Government of Sava Grujić envisaged the division of the army into an active (standing) and national by the proposal of the Law on Amendments to the Law on the Organization of the Army adopted on 3 April 1888. This law represented a combination of a national and standing army, with the first call still being regulated as a standing army, and the second and third calls would represent the national army However, the proposed Laws brought great resentment with King Milan, who told the Austro-Hungarian deputy Hengelmiler that "the Radical Party is working on the preparation of the revolution and that they only want to get it on time so that they could pass the Law on the formation of a national army, and on the basis of it arm the people and then start the revolution."

The king was increasingly showing disappointment in the Radicals and sought a way to overthrow the Radical Government.5 When the Radical Government submitted the signed Law on Municipalities to the King, adopted in the Assembly by a large majority, he refused to sign it. Sava Grujić reminded the King that by the agreement of December 1887, "which he had made with the radicals" the enactment of this law was included. To that, King Milan replied: "Well, sue me for the failure to complete the contract!" In such a situation, Grujić had no other option but to resign on 26 April 1888.

The Constitution prescribed that the King should renounce the throne and appoint viceroys who would reign on behalf of his minor son Aleksandar. The King appointed three viceroys. The viceroys were not Radicals, but, as the Radicals were the strongest, they conferred government upon them. Soon after the document's approval by the National Assembly, the King abdicates and leave Serbia. After the abdication of King Milan, the prominent Radical leader Nikola Pašić is finally pardoned and allowed to return to Serbia.

=== The Radical regime 1889–1892 ===
The period from February 1889 to August 1892 was the longest period prior to 1903 in which Sava Grujić and the Radicals were in power. During those three and a half years they were able to implement and develop a political system based on the Constitution of 1888 and on intensive legislative activity. This period of Serbian history was rightfully named "the Radical regime". Sava Grujić serves as Prime Minister for the first two years March 1889– February 1891.

According to the law on elections of representatives, passed in March 1890, the Radicals succeeded in introducing virtually general voting right without any census. It contained several important reforms that secured a democratic electoral procedure: it introduced the secret ballot, power during the elections was assigned to the president of the electoral committee, without any interference of State authorities, and a detailed penal code was introduced for cases of abuse during the elections. Two other legal documents were passed during Radical rule and shed a greater understanding of the Radical interpretation of democracy. The law on ministerial responsibility dated January 1891, gave the right of questioning to both the National Assembly and to the King. The ministerial responsibility was both political and criminal. The law on communes, enforced in November 1889, was designed to introduce the concept of local self-government as the most important political system in the country. The application of this system essentially meant the realisation of the Radical program.

At the end of his mandate, Sava Grujić is sent as the Serbian envoy to Constantinople, from 1891 to 1893 he will continue the policy led by his predecessor Stojan Novaković. During his mandate, there was a conflict between the Turkish authorities and the Patriarchate regarding the Patriarchal privileges. The authorities had tried to impose firm control upon Serbian schools, by issuing an official announcement in January 1892, in which they demanded to review the statutes of all non-Muslim schools Sava Grujić recommended to the Serbian consul to advise people to submit applications directly to the Turkish authorities, in accordance with the Article 129 of the law on Public Education in Turkey.

=== Political isolation ===
On 13 April 1893, the minor King Alexander Obrenović, while dining with members of the Regency, supported by the army and government members, declares himself legally aged and proclaims himself king. At first the Radical accept to work with the new King, and after parliamentary elections, they win the majority of seats once again. Sava Grujić forms his third government in 1893 becoming first Minister of Defence from 4 June to 23 November 1893 then from 23 November 1893 Prime Minister, Minister of War and Acting Minister for Foreign Affairs.

After old King Milan returns from exile the Radicals and the Obrenović dynasty enter again into open confrontation. Radical public meetings are banned and in May 1894 the King abolished the modern 1888 Constitution and reinstitute the one adopted in 1869. The majority of the laws passed under Radical rule are changed or suppressed, King Aleksandar opts for 'neutral' Governments – in other words, he establishes a personal regime.

== Diplomatic service 1897–1903 ==
=== Envoy in St. Petersburg 1897–1899 ===
During this difficult political time for the Radicals, Sava Grujić is sent as the Serbian envoy to St. Petersburg to represent Serbia as Tsar Nicholas II of Russia begins his reign. In Serbia, on 21 June 1899 an abortive attempt on the ex-King Milan's life, an event known as the "St John's Day's Attempt", made by a young man from Bosnia is used by the government as a pretext to arrest the Party's most outspoken leaders and place them before a Court-Martial.

Milan insisted on the death penalty for Pašić and Taušanović in retaliation for all past and present conflicts and clashes. Pašić agreed to accuse some of his Party comrades (Protić and Živković) of anti-dynastic attitudes and possible inspiration for the attempted assassination and, in return, his and Taušanović's lives were spared. In the end, the accused Radicals were sentenced to twenty years of hard labour, Taušanović to 10 years and Pašić to only five years in prison. These measures were accompanied by organised attacks on the Radicals. They were being fired, persecuted, and purged throughout Serbia.

=== Envoy in Constantinople 1900–1903 ===
One more time Sava Grujić is sent as the Serbian envoy to Constantinople as top diplomat. In 1901, the Radical movement re-emerged in Serbian politics with the death of their arch-enemy, ex-King Milan Obrenović, once again, as many times before, the Radicals insist on constitutional reform.

== The 1903 May coup ==
The turning point in modern Serbian history came in 1903. That year was marked by the assassination of King Alexander I of Serbia, Queen Draga, her two brothers and two ministers by a group of young Serbian officers on 10 June 1903. Sava Grujić was in Constantinople at the time, where he was a deputy at the Turkish court. This event marked the end of the Obrenović dynasty which had ruled Serbia with interruptions for more than seventy years, but more importantly, it opened the door for constitutional parliamentary democracy.

In June 1903, only a month after the King's death, a new constitution, with essentially the same text as that of 1888, is passed by the Grand National Assembly. The Serbian Skupština invited Peter Karađorđević to assume the Serbian crown as Peter I of Serbia. The Serbian Radical party was not directly involved in the coup d'etat, but it was one of the groups that benefited the most from the overthrow of the Obrenovic dynasty. As the most popular political party within Serbia by far, it has been estimated that by 1903 as much as 80% of Serbia's population either supported or belonged to the Serbian Radicals, the transformation of Serbia into a parliamentary democracy meant that the Radicals would dominate the parliament and that they would continually form the government and run Serbia.

== Return to government ==
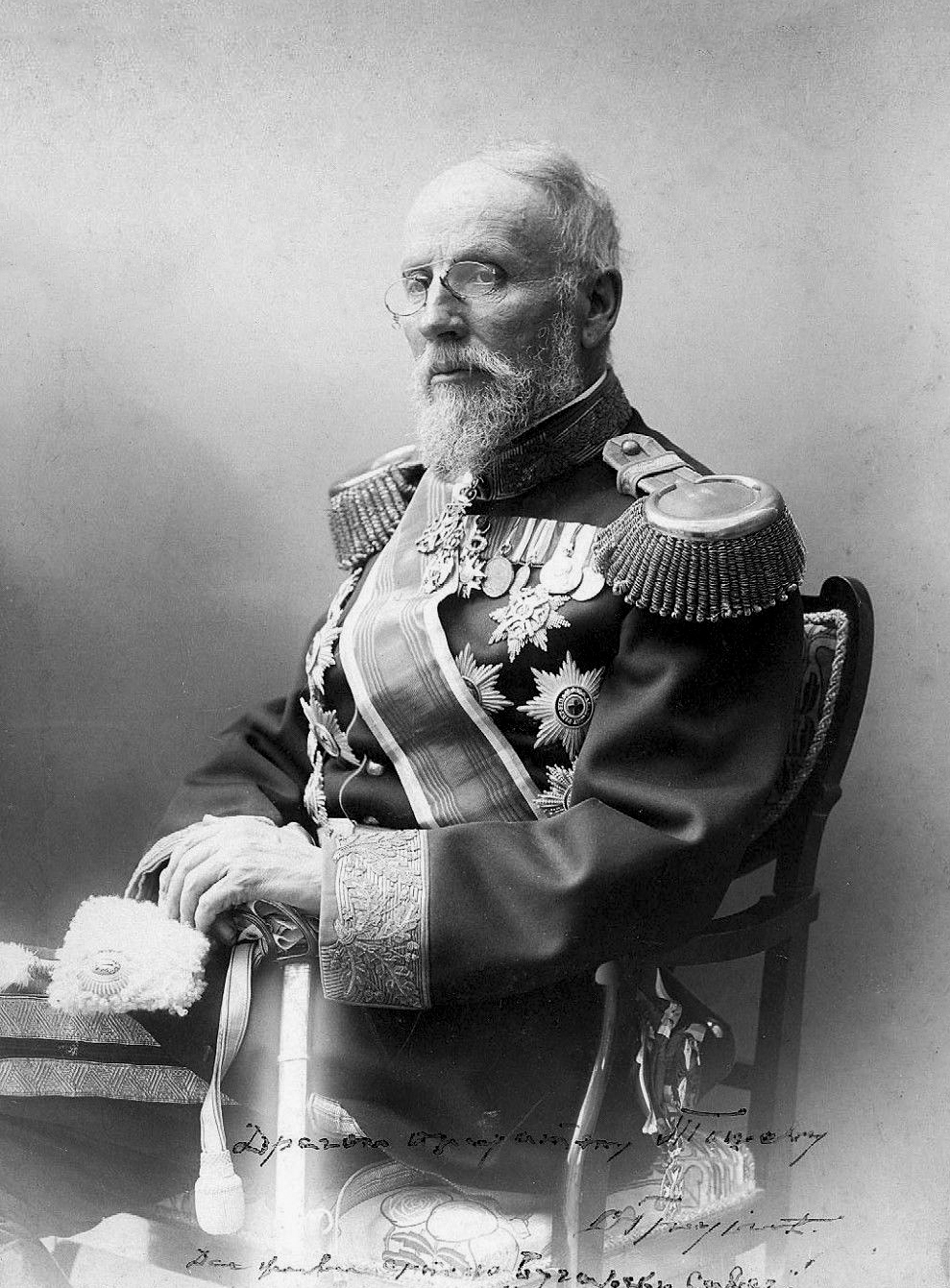
General Sava Grujić in 1912

On 15 June 1903, Peter I of Serbia became the new Serbian head of state, the third son of Alexander Karadjordjević, he had been educated in France and Switzerland. A nationalistic Serb, he had fought in the Bosnian War, Peter was crowned in 1904, the new King was committed to the creation of true parliamentary government.

Sava Grujić, who had replaced Jovan Avakumović's "revolutionary" 1903 Cabinet, was offered to form a new government either with Pašić Old Radicals or with the Independent Radicals Grujić became head of the Council of State in June then, looking for the widest possible support in the National Assembly, on 4 October 1903, Grujić formed a coalition Cabinet embracing both wings of the Radical Party: the Old Radicals of Pašić and the Independent Radicals led by the younger French-oriented intellectuals.

On 21 November 1903, Grujić became prime minister staying in that position until 27 November 1904. In the negotiations for a new Cabinet, in November 1904, both groups concluded that their coalition could not continue, given their differences in major issues such as floating a loan, the purchase of guns and the railway construction. From 1 March 1906 to 17 April 1906, Sava Grujić was Prime Minister and War Minister. The Radical Party entered its Golden Age. After over twenty years of struggle, rebellion, crisis, compromise, and success, it became powerful and mature enough to dominate Serbian politics and decisively contribute to Serbia's emergence as a democratic European state.

== Later life and death ==
=== The Hague Peace Conference of 1907 ===
In 1907, Sava Grujić headed the Serbian delegation to the second Hague convention where he spent several months as President of the Serbian Council of State and Delegate Plenipotentiary. The conference sat from 15 June to 18 October 1907 and was attended by the representatives of 44 states, it was convened as a restraint on war, to reduce the amount nations spent on armaments, and to ensure ‘to all peoples the benefits of a real and lasting peace’.

The Hague Conventions treaty also established the laws and customs of war in the strict sense, by defining Methods of warfare: the rules that belligerents must follow during hostilities. This branch of international law is known as the laws of war, as opposed to the one governing the right to receive relief, as defined in the Geneva Conventions that establish the protection of victims of conflict as well as the limitation of methods of warfare.

=== Retirement and death ===
In 1906 he retired from active political life but remained President of the State Council a position he kept from 1906 to 1910. October 1913 saw the end of the Balkan War against the Turks when Serbia together with Greece and Bulgaria liberated the Balkan Peninsula from the Turks. The following month, Grujić died peacefully at home on his 73rd birthday.

=== Writings ===
Grujić wrote a number of military manuals and books, including Vojna organizacija Srbije (The military organization of Serbia; 1874) and Osnovi vojnog uredzienja knez¡ evine Bugarske (The foundations of the military structure of the principality of Bulgaria; 1880). One of his best known publications which was very popular at the time was the History of the Serbo-Turkish Wars of 1816–1818 in four volumes, in it he wrote about his wartime experience and his memoir is considered one of the best analyses of the wars.

== Personal life ==
=== Marriage and children ===
After his first wife Angelina died at a young age, Sava Grujić remarried Milica Radovanović in 1867; they had four children; two sons: Captain Borislav (Boro) Grujić was born in 1876, Captain Aleksandar (Alek) Grujić born in 1879; and two daughters: Marija born in 1883, married to Cavalry Divisional General Vojin Tcholak-Antitch, Chief Inspector of Cavalry, a member of the Čolak-Antić family and a descendant of Čolak-Anta Simeonović and Olga, Lady-in-Waiting to Princess Olga of Yugoslavia, married to Professor Milivoje S. Lozanić, son of Sima Lozanić. They were parents of Stanka, Countess of Lauderdale, wife of the 17th Earl of Lauderdale.

=== Legacy ===
Generala Save Grujića is a street of the western section of downtown Belgrade.

== Affiliations ==
- Honorary member, Serbian Academy of Science
- Honorary member, Russian Archaeological Institute

== See also ==
- List of prime ministers of Serbia
- Grujić family (in Serbian)

Political offices
Preceded by Jovan Ristić	Prime Minister of the Kingdom of Serbia; 1887–1888	Succeeded by Nikola Hristić
Preceded by Jovan Ristić	Minister of Defence of the Kingdom of Serbia; 1888–1889	Succeeded by Nikola Hristić
Preceded by Kosta Protić	Prime Minister of the Kingdom of Serbia; 1889–1890	Succeeded by Koste Protić
Preceded by Sava Grujić	Prime Minister of the Kingdom of Serbia; 1890–1891	Succeeded by Nikola Pašić
Preceded by Lazar Dokić	Prime Minister of the Kingdom of Serbia; 1893–1894	Succeeded by Đorđe S. Simić
Preceded by Jovan Đ. Avakumović	Prime Minister of the Kingdom of Serbia; 1903–1904	Succeeded by Sava Grujić
Preceded by Sava Grujić	Prime Minister of the Kingdom of Serbia; 1904–1904	Succeeded by Nikola Pašić
Preceded by Ljubomir Stojanović	Prime Minister of the Kingdom of Serbia; 1906–1906	Succeeded by Nikola Pašić
