= Military archives =

Military archives may refer to:

- Irish Military Archives, at Cathal Brugha Barracks, Rathmines, Dublin, Ireland
- Liddell Hart Centre for Military Archives, at King's College, London, United Kingdom
- Military Archives of Serbia, located in Belgrade, Serbia
- Military Archives of Sweden, located in Arninge, Täby, Stockholm County, Sweden
