= Jovan Atanacković =

Serbian general

- Јован Атанацковић
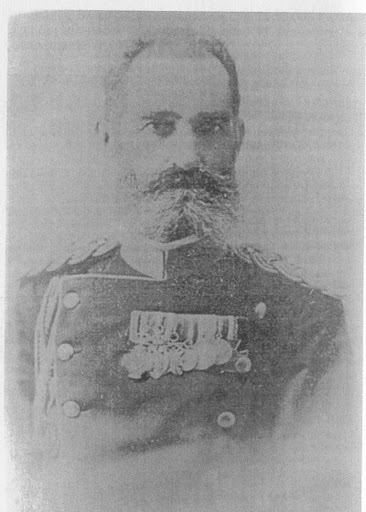

Minister of Defence
- In office 1899–1900
- Monarch: Alexander I of Serbia
- Preceded by: Dragomir Vučković
- Succeeded by: Miloš Vasić

Personal details
- Born: 24 March 1848 Negotin, Principality of Serbia
- Died: 9 August 1921 (aged 73) Belgrade, Kingdom of Yugoslavia
- Occupation: General, Minister of Defence

(Note: Serbia remained on the Julian calendar until 10 January 1919, when the Kingdom of the Serbs, Croats and Slovenes adopted the Gregorian calendar. During the 19th century, the Julian calendar was 12 days behind the Gregorian calendar, and the difference became 13 days in the 20th century. Thus, Atanacković's birth date of 24 March 1848 was on 5 April 1848 in the Gregorian calendar. However, his death date of 9 August 1921 was on that day on the Gregorian calendar used in Serbia.)

Jovan Atanacković (Serbian Cyrillic: Јован Атанацковић, 24 March 1848 – 9 August 1921) was a Serbian general, Minister of Defence, and president of the Central Board of Belgrade of the Serbian Chetnik Organization.

== Life ==
Born in Negotin, he finished gymnasium in his home town, after which he entered the Serbian Military Academy in Belgrade. Jovan entered the army service as a cadet of the 7th Artillery School on 9 October 1865. He was ranked third in his class when he finished his education in 1870, and then he was made the 1st artillery lieutenant.

After he finished the Artillery School he was first made sergeant of the 1st field battery of the Standing Army, on 7 January 1871; he was then made registrar in the Artillery Inspection. From April 1872 he was a commander of the people's battery of Ćuprija, and from 8 April 1874, he was made sergeant in the 1st Artillery Regiment of the Standing Army. He was made commander of the 1st Mountain Battery on 15 April 1875. He was made commander of the 2nd Heavy Battery of Timok Valley on 17 April 1876, with which he participated in the First Serbian-Turkish War in 1876/77. He became chief of staff of the Krajina Army on 10 June 1877. After three months, on 9 September, he was appointed chief of staff of Drina Corps and he remained on that function during operations in the Second Serbian-Turkish War. He became chief of staff of Drina Division on 5 October 1878 and after a year, on 23 October 1879, he was transferred to the General Staff Division and attached to the Office of Prince Milan Obrenović.

On 1 April 1880 Jovan was appointed acting Chief of Staff of the Artillery Brigade until 30 October 1882, when he became Chief of Staff of the Active Army Command. On 15 February 1883, he was appointed commander of the 11th Battalion of the Standing Army, and on 12 October that year he was named acting commander of the Šumadija Standing Infantry Regiment. He became Chief of Operative Division of the Staff of the Supreme Command on 2 November 1885. While there he participated in the war against Bulgaria in 1885. He was named Chief of Staff of the Danube Division Area on 1 March 1886. Afterwards, he returned to the Šumadija Standing Infantry Regiment on 30 April 1888 but this time as commander.

On 25 August Jovan was appointed chief of the Internal Section of the Operative Division of the Main General Staff. He was then named chief of History and Archive Division of the Main General Staff on 27 March 1889, and remained on that duty until 10 February 1893 when he became commander of the Timok Division Area. On 2 September 1894, he was appointed chief of General Military Division of the Ministry of Defense. While he was on that duty, in the period 1894-1896, he was the editor of the Official Military Gazette. He was named assistant and acting chief of the Main General Staff on 18 March 1897. After that, on 1 February 1899, he was appointed commander of the Belgrade Fortress and he remained on that duty until 25 May that year. At the same time, he was appointed president of the Artillery Committee.

From 11 October 1897 he was minister of civil engineering in the Cabinet of Vladan Đorđević. He remained in that position until 22 January 1899, when he retired. He returned to that position on 25 May and remained there until he was appointed Minister of Defense in December that year. With the reconstruction of the Cabinet of Vladan Đorđević, after the death of Dragomir Vučković on 10 December 1899, he was named Minister of Defense until 12 July 1900. On 12 July 1900, he retired for the first time, but on 20 November 1902, he was reactivated and appointed infantry inspector of the Ministry of Defense. Seven days after this appointment, he also became a member of the Higher Military Council.

After the May Coup (Serbia) which was carried out on 29 May 1903, in the Cabinet of Jovan Avakumović, from 29 May 1903 until 12 July 1903, he was reappointed Minister of Defense. He was at the same duty in the Cabinet of Jovan Avakumović from 12 July until 2 August 1903, when he resigned. After he left the duty of the minister of defence, on 8 August, he was appointed Chancellor of Royal Decorations. At about the same time he became a member of the Serbian Committee (Српски комитет) which was established in September 1903 in Belgrade, by the combined Central Boards of Belgrade, Vranje, Skopje and Bitola. There he was elected president of the Central Board of Belgrade. He remained on that duty until 31 March 1906, when he was retired for the second time, this time upon his own request. During the war in 1912, as reserve general, he was mobilized and made a delegate of the Serbian Government with King Nikola Petrović and the Montenegrin Supreme Command. He remained a delegate until his return to Serbia in December 1913, when he was appointed Chancellor of Royal Decorations for the second time.

After he was released from this duty, on 1 April 1917, he went to Switzerland, where he established the Bureau for Prisoners of War. He was head of this organization until the end of 1918 when he turned over all the archival files to the International Federation of Red Cross, and he finally retired. Besides the mentioned wartime and peacetime appointments, he performed other duties as well. During the 1880s and 1890s on several occasions, he was a member of the Examination Commission for officers. In 1899, besides numerous other duties, he was also president of the Disability Tribunal.

== Decorations ==
=== National ===
- Order of the White Eagle of the 4th and 5th degree
- Order of the Cross of Takovo with Swords of the 5th degree
- Order of the Cross of Takovo of the 2nd degree
- Silver Medal of Courage
- Memorial for wars in 1876-78, 1885–86 and 1912–18

=== International ===
==== French ====
- Legion of Honour of the 5th degree

==== Austrian ====
- Order of Franz Joseph of the 3rd degree

Political offices
Preceded by Dragomir Vučković	Minister of Defence; 1899–1900	Succeeded by Miloš Vasić
Preceded by Milovan Pavlović	Minister of Defence; 1903	Succeeded by Leonid Solarević
Preceded by Jovan Mišković	Chief of the General Staff; 1897–1898	Succeeded by Dimitrije Cincar-Marković
