= Jovan Andjelković (general) =

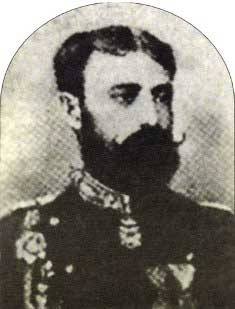
Jovan Andjelković

Jovan Andjelković also spelled Jovan Anđelković (Serbian: Јован Анђелковић; (14) 26 June 1840 – (16) 28 August 1885) was a general of the Armed Forces of the Principality of Serbia, a professional writer, professor at the Military Academy in Belgrade. In the period from 1880 to 1882, he was the acting Chief of the Serbian General Staff. In 1879 he also served as the 5th Dean of the Academic Board and chief of the Military Academy.

== Biography ==
He was born in Belgrade, Principality of Serbia on (14) 26 June 1840. After completing his high school education, he enrolled at the Artillery School of the Military Academy in 1855. In time he was promoted to the rank of lieutenant when he completed the five-year course. In 1862 and 1867 two Bulgarian legions of volunteers were founded, thanks to the Serbian General Staff of which Andjelković was a member. Later, he was promoted to the rank of major (1873), lieutenant colonel (1876), colonel (1879) and general (1885). He died on August (16) 28 1885 in Plzeň, Austria-Hungary while observing Austro-Hungarian Army maneuvers.

== Military career ==
In his military career, he performed the following important functions:

- Adjutant Commander of the Right Wing of the Defense (1862);
- Adjutant to Milan Obrenović;
- Chief of Staff of the South Morava Army (1876);
- Chief of Staff of the Drina Corps;
- Chief of the Operational Department of the Supreme Command Staff (1877–1878).

He was also a professor and chief of the Military Academy in Belgrade.

== Bibliography ==
He has published several articles and books:

- "Bosnia according to Roskijević" (1876)
- "Terms for warfare" (1876)
- "Trojan War" (1882)
- "Notes from military history" (from Ratnik, books 7, 8, 11 and 12 from 1882 and 1884)

== Decorations ==
- Order of the Cross of Takovo with swords of the III class,
- Order of the Cross of Takovo, V class,
- Order of the White Eagle, IV class,
- Order of Prince Danilo I,
- The Gold Medal for Zealous Service in Wars,
- The Commemorative War Memorial of 1876–1878,
- Order of the Star of Romania, III class, and
- The Turkish Order of the Medjidie, III class

== Sources ==
- Ivetić, Velimir (2000). Načelnici Generalštaba 1876-2000 [Chiefs of the General Staff] (in Serbian). Beograd: Novinsko-informativni centar VOJSKA.

Military offices
Preceded by Ljubomir Ivanović	Chief of the Military Academy; 1879	Succeeded by Stevan Zdravković
Preceded by Milojko Lešjanin	Chief of the Serbian General Staff; 1880–1882	Succeeded by Milojko Lešjanin
