= Kosta Protić =

Serbian general (1831–1892)

General Kosta S. Protić
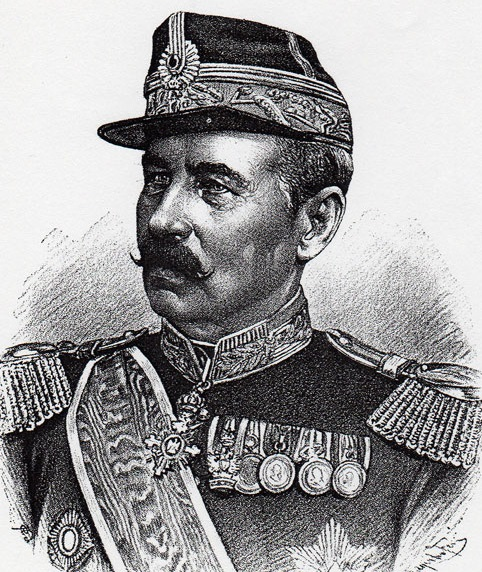

7th Prime Minister of the Kingdom of Serbia
- In office 19 January 1889 – 7 March 1889
- Monarch: Milan I
- Preceded by: Nikola Hristić
- Succeeded by: Sava Grujić

7th Minister of Army the Principality of Serbia
- In office 22 October 1873 – 19 August 1875
- Monarch: Milan I
- Prime Minister: Jovan Ristić; Jovan Marinović; Aćim Čumić; Danilo Stefanović
- Preceded by: Milojko Lešjanin
- Succeeded by: Tihomilj Nikolić

Minister of Construction of the Principality of Serbia
- In office 21 September 1883 – 7 February 1884
- Monarch: Milan I
- Prime Minister: Nikola Hristić
- In office 2 May 1885 – 23 March 1886
- Monarch: Milan I
- Prime Minister: Milutin Garašanin

8th Minister of Army of the Kingdom of Serbia
- In office 14 April 1888 – 22 February 1889
- Monarch: Milan I
- Prime Minister: Sava Grujić; Nikola Hristić; Himself
- Preceded by: Sava Grujić
- Succeeded by: Dimitrije Đurić

3rd Chief of the General Staff of the Principality of Serbia
- In office 1878 – 1879; Acting
- Monarch: Milan I
- Preceded by: Jovan Dragašević (acting)
- Succeeded by: Milojko Lešjanin

Head of the Regency Council of Serbia
- In office 6 March 1882 – 4 June 1892 Serving with Jovan Ristić; Jovan Belimarković
- Preceded by: Milan I (as king)
- Succeeded by: Alexander I (as king)

Personal details
- Born: 29 September 1831 Požarevac, Principality of Serbia
- Died: 4 June 1892 (aged 60) Brestovačka Banja, Kingdom of Serbia
- Party: Independent
- Occupation: Military

Kosta Protić (Serbian Cyrillic: Коста Протић; 29 September 1831 – 4 June 1892) was a Serbian general who served as Prime Minister of Serbia and the Chief of the Serbian General Staff.

== Biography ==
His maternal grandfather was revolutionary Ilija Stošić. During the Herzegovinian Uprising in 1875, Kosta Protić was sent by the Serbian government to Russia to investigate the possibilities for a war loan. Ivan Aksakov received Protić, instructed him and gave him letters of recommendation to the right persons in Saint Petersburg; moreover, since Aksakov's wife was a former lady-in-waiting with connections at the court, she introduced Protić to the empress Maria Alexandrovna and to the heir, the future Alexander III of Russia. The two were in favor of helping the Serbs of Bosnia and Herzegovina rid themselves of the Turks, more so than their government. Through their intercession public subscription for a loan was authorized by the tsar.

Protić served as a military officer during the Serbian-Ottoman War (1876-1877) and the Russo-Turkish War (1877–78). He served as the Chief of the Serbian General Staff during the Russo-Turkish War. He later briefly served as Prime Minister of the Kingdom of Serbia during 1889. Upon the abdication of King Milan, Protić was appointed to a Regency council with Jovan Ristić and Jovan Belimarković for the underage Alexander I, on which he served until his death.

== Honors ==
Domestic

- Order of the White Eagle
- Order of the Cross of Takovo with swords, First and Second class
- Order of the Cross of Takovo, Third class
- Medal for Zealous Service, Gold with diamonds
- Commemorative Medal for the War of 1876–1878
- Commemorative Medal for the Serbian-Bulgarian War of 1885

Foreign

- Order of St. Stanislaus, First class (Russia)
- Order of St. Anna, Second class (Russia)
- Order of the Crown of Romania, with a star (Romania)
- Order of the Star of Romania (Romania)
- Military Virtue Medal (Romania)
- Order of the Iron Crown, Third class (Austria-Hungary)

== See also ==
- List of prime ministers of Serbia

Government offices
Preceded by Nikola Hristić	Prime Minister of Serbia; 1889	Succeeded by Sava Grujić
Preceded by Milojko Lešjanin	Minister of Defence; 1873–1875	Succeeded by Tihomilj Nikolić
Preceded by Jovan Dragašević	Chief of the General Staff; 1878–1879	Succeeded by Milojko Lešjanin
Preceded by Sava Grujić	Minister of Defence; 1888–1889	Succeeded by Dimitrije Đurić
Preceded by Nikola Hristić	Prime Minister of Serbia; 1889	Succeeded by Sava Grujić
