= Vojvoda (Serbia and Yugoslavia) =

Army rank in kingdoms of Serbia and Yugoslavia in first half of 20th century

Vojvoda Војвода / Vojvoda
- Rank flag of a Vojvoda from 1929.

- Insignia of the shoulder strap used from 1901 until 1918 and from 1918 until 1945.
- Country: Kingdom of Serbia; Kingdom of Yugoslavia
- Service branch: Royal Serbian Army; Royal Yugoslav Army
- Rank: Field marshal
- Formation: 9th century (historical); January 27, 1901
- Abolished: April 24, 1946
- Next lower rank: Army general

Vojvoda (Serbian Cyrillic: Војвода lit. 'war-leader' from old Serbian) was the highest rank in the army of the Kingdom of Serbia and Kingdom of Yugoslavia from 1901 until end of Second World War in 1945. It has roots from the medieval term Voivode used during medieval Kingdom, Empire and Principality of Serbia. Vojvoda in medieval and later Principality of Serbia it had a similar meaning as a Duke title in other feudal states as it was both a military and noble title. In modern military terms the rank of Vojvoda is equivalent with field marshal and Generalfeldmarschall, but since it can be an honorable title, it is not always a military rank of a commissioned military officer.

It was first created with the passing of the law on the Organization of the Army of the Kingdom of Serbia in 1901 and later confirmed in Kingdom of Yugoslavia laws on the Organization of the Army and Navy from 1923 and 1929. Law from 1901 was passed on the suggestion of Lieutenant colonel (later Divisional General) Miloš Vasić who was Minister of the Defense at the time. The rank was awarded only during the war for Particular military contributions of top generals.

In the Balkan Wars and World War I this title was used to designate the highest military rank in Serbian Army. The first Vojvoda was promoted by the Great military decree of the Kingdom of Serbia on October 20, 1912. Only four people ever officially held that rank: Radomir Putnik (in 1912), Stepa Stepanović (middle 1914), Živojin Mišić (late 1914) and Petar Bojović (1918). Before this rank was introduced, the highest rank in the Kingdom of Serbia was Army general. After Second World War, the newly formed Yugoslav People's Army stopped using the Royal ranking system, so this rank ceased to exist.

== Insignia of rank ==
The rank insignia of a Vojvoda was an epaulet consisting of braids and in the middle was added a two-headed white eagle, the national emblem of the Kingdom of Serbia. In 1923 the design of epaulets remained the same with one amendment, the national emblem of the Kingdom of Serbia was replaced by the state coat of arms of the Kingdom of Yugoslavia.

== Introduction of rank ==
In late 1897 and early 1898 took place the fracture stages in the development of the army. King Milan returned to Serbia and initiated the process of military reform. The most important date in the history of the Kingdom of Serbia was December 25, 1897. On that day, King Alexander I of Serbia signed two decrees. The first re-established active Army Command, which was supposed to start work on Saint Sava next year, while the other was the appointment of King Milan as the new commander. On the same day, an active Army Command is a military regulation that was subordinate to the Ministry of the military. In practice, this was not so, because practically active military commanders commanded all commands, units and military institutions, while a Minister of Defense has no right to use military force, and he turned into a military administrator. At that time, the First Minister of War was Dragomir Vučković who had the rank of colonel. He formally subordinate to the commander of the active army held the rank of general. When the post of Minister of War set up Jovan Atanacković who had the rank of general, there is a need for the introduction of a new military rank for the active military commander.

=== Former rank ===
The change in the structure of the army from 1897 to 1900 year was a time when new military ranks were introduced. The then existing Law on Organization of the Army from 1886 included eight military ranks. Sub-lieutenant, Lieutenant, Captain II class, Captain I class and they were lower officer ranks, while major, lieutenant colonel, colonel and general where were higher officer ranks. At this time new ranks were introduced warrant officer and army general that was honorary rank. In December 1898, King Alexander I had signed a decree and authorized the then minister of defence to submit it for approval to the assembly. The new command is related to the increase in salaries of lower-ranking officers and generals grading rank within: Brigade, Divisional and Corps. This command is not passed with the amendments in the national assembly, but for a little more than a year in a modified form, this project is finally realized.

At the XXVI regular session of the National Assembly, following the report of the Military Committee, adopted new amendments to the Law on the organization of the army. Minister Ilija Stojanović during the parliamentary debate, before the adoption of the law, emphasized the need for introducing a higher rank than the current staff, the act of army general. According to him, the victim would not be large because the Serbian Army had one, and then in the future two or three. It was clear that the new act is intended for an active army commander to King Milan. The opposite opinion was Živan Živanović, who pointed out that the allocation of this act, in this case, had more political than military significance. This is supported by the aforementioned fact that King Milan, before returning, it is not intended that their military rank, raised by this, but by their desire other military action, which was the title of the Supreme Commander. Therefore, in the summer of 1897 addressed to Stojan Novaković opinion, if anyone other than Karađorđe, was the holder. How Novaković did not know that the founder of the house Obrenović, Prince Miloš was in the Second Serbian uprising, also holds the title of Supreme Leader, King Milan knowing only then that the founder of another dynasty holder of this title, he refused to accept the proposal of this title.

And without this title, the former king has become the holder of the highest military rank in the state, and not only in relation to all the other generals, but also in relation to his son, the then supreme commander King Alexander I. Decision Assembly, and adopted the draft Law on amendments to the Law on the organization of the army, confirmed King Alexander January 12, 1900. Two days later (January 14), the new act is due to the merit of the two-year work on reforming the Army awarded the King's father. The act was introduced due to the rise of the military rank of King Milan. According to the legislation on the organization of the Army (Article 27), the rank of an army general was granted to only by the monarch any general regardless of the time spent in a general's rank. The departure of the King of the Kingdom of Serbia, Milan, gone is the main reason for the existence of this act. General Mihailo Srećković successor as commander of the active army, wasn't promoted to this rank. The new law on the organization of the army from 1901 (Article 7), contrary to earlier, it is not anticipated that the Minister of War in command only performs the tasks laid down in-laws and was administrator of the army.

=== Vojvoda rank ===
The new law on the Organization of the army of January 27, 1901, whose creator was then Minister of War, Lieutenant Colonel (later Divisional general) Miloš Vasić, has introduced a new highest military rank in the Serbian army. Vojvoda rank brought changes in the general officer ranks. Instead of the previously divided into the upper and lower system, it was introduced a new category for generals, made up of the two highest ranks – General and Vojvoda. The introduction of this act repealed the act of Army General a mark on the epaulets, which previously belonged to the previous act, have been taken as a mark of the rank of Vojvoda. According to the law (Article 17), the rank of Vojvoda could only get during the war and it had allocated monarch at its discretion. The new amendments to the Law on Organization of the Army of March 31, 1904, the rank of Vojvoda could get only in war and in him only improve the general who was awarded for successful work. On the first promotion to the rank, the Serbian army waited eleven years.

The first promoted general was Radomir Putnik in 1912, and he was the sole carrier of the Vojvoda rank for two years. Stepa Stepanović and Živojin Mišić were acquired this rank in the space of five months in 1914. Petar Bojović earned rank in 1918 and he was the last Serbian general promoted. Essentially, only these four Serbian general have been de facto promoted to this rank and had clear hierarchical positions because of it, whereas in all the other cases it was merely a monarch's honorific title, or an honorary decoration as in the case of d'Espèrey.

The newly formed army of the Kingdom of Yugoslavia continued the system of military ranks of the army of the Kingdom of Serbia, with small changes. In 1919, former Austria-Hungarian Generalfeldmarschall Svetozar Borojević filed a petition over the command in Klagenfurt, to be accepted into a new army of the Kingdom of Serbs, Croats and Slovenes. This request had been rejected as Vojvoda Mišić said that one of the Ministers from the Croatia protested. On 19 July 1923, a new law on the organization of the army and navy was introduced graduation generals act modelled on the French system of grading: Brigadier general, Divisional general and Army general. According to the law from the regular structure of general promotion, Vojvoda was singled out and could only be obtained in a war, by exceptional merit.

According to the constitutions of the Kingdom of Serbia and the Kingdom of Yugoslavia, the supreme commanders assumed their rank after taking the oath to the constitution, and the Minister of the Army and Navy awarded them a uniform with the special Vojvoda insignia. Among them are Kings: Milan I, Alexander I (Obrenović), Peter I, Alexander I (Karađorđević) and Peter II. The Constitution permitted that in case of war, in the case of underage the king, deputy Supreme Commander would be Vojvoda active or in reserve.

After the end of World War II, the proclamation of the Socialist Federal Republic of Yugoslavia on 29 November 1945, and the establishment of the Yugoslav People's Army on April 24, 1946, adopted the military hierarchy modelled on the Soviet Union with Marshal as the highest rank, which however became essentially an honorific title with political connotations used only by Josip Bros Tito. This decree abolished all ranks which had previously been in force, and the Vojvoda rank that existed for forty four years ceased to exist.

| Date of promotion | Image | Name and style | Annulled/Dead | Notes |
|---|---|---|---|---|
| January 14, 1900 | | King Milan I | † February 11, 1901 | Ad honorem; Commander of Active Army; Royal Family – House of Obrenović |
| January 27, 1901 | | King Alexander | † June 11, 1903 | Ex officio; Royal Family – House of Obrenović |
| June 15, 1903 | | King Peter I | † August 16, 1921 | Ex officio; Royal Family – House of Karađorđević |
| October 20, 1912 | | Radomir Putnik | † May 17, 1917 | Promotion; Chief of Staff of the Supreme Command of the Serbian Army |
| August 20, 1914 | | Stepa Stepanović | † April 29, 1929 | Promotion; Commander of Second Army |
| December 4, 1914 | | Živojin Mišić | † January 20, 1921 | Promotion; Commander of First Army |
| September 13, 1918 | | Petar Bojović | † January 19, 1945 | Promotion; Commander of First Army |
| January 29, 1921 | | Louis Franchet d'Espèrey | † July 8, 1942 | Ad honorem; Commander of Allied Army of the Orient |
| August 16, 1921 | | King Alexander I | † October 9, 1934 | Ex officio; Royal Family – House of Karađorđević |
| October 9, 1934 | | King Peter II | November 29, 1945 (Note: On 29 November 1945 parliament of Democratic Republic of Yugoslavia deposed Peter II as head of state but he did not formally abdicate.) † November 3, 1970 | Ex officio; Royal Family – House of Karađorđević |

== Sources ==
- Bjelajac, Mile (2004). Generali i admirali Kraljevine Jugoslavije 1918—1941. Belgrade: Institut za novu istoriju Srbije. ISBN 86-7005-039-0.
- Mičić, Rajko St. (1923). Four Field Marshal's. COBISS 41902087
- Milićević, Milić (2002). Reforma Vojske Srbije: 1897—1900. Beograd: Vojnoizdavački zavod. ISBN 86-335-0112-0.
- Milićević, Milić; Popović, Ljubodrag (2003). Generali Vojska Kneževine i Kraljevine Srbije. Beograd: Vojnoizdavački zavod. ISBN 86-335-0142-2.
- Milićević, Milić; Popović, Ljubodrag (1998). Ministri vojni Kneževine i Kraljevine Srbije: 1862—1918. Beograd: Vojnoizdavački zavod. ISBN 86-335-0035-3.
