= Orders, decorations, and medals of the Principality of Serbia =

Medals of the Principality of Serbia

Coat of Arms of the Principality of Serbia

This is a list of the orders and decorations of the Principality of Serbia (1804 – 1882).

== Orders ==
- Order of the Cross of Takovo (5 Classes)

== Medals ==
- Silver Medal for Bravery 1876
- Medal for Bravery 1877 – 1878 (Gold and Silver Classes)
- Distinguished Service Medal 1876 – 1878 (Gold and Silver Classes)
- Distinguished Service Medal for "aiding wounded and ailing soldiers for the 1876 and 1877 – 1878 wars" aka Princess Natalia Medal (Gold and Silver Classes)
- Order of the Serbian Red Cross Society

== Commemorative medals ==
- Commemorative Memorial Medal for the 1876 and 1877 – 1878 wars
