= Radovan Miletić =

Serbian defence minister

Radovan Miletić (Serbian Cyrillic: Радован Милетић; 12 January 1844 – 1919) was a Serbian army colonel and geographer.

He fought in 1885 in the Serbo-Bulgarian War, commanding the Timok Division in the rank of colonel under the leadership of Milojko Lešjanin. He also served as Minister of the Army of Serbia in the Ministry of Defence from 11 February 1891 to 7 May 1891. He was succeeded by Jovan Praporčetović.

Radovan Miletić was born on 12 January 1844 in Požarevac, Principality of Serbia. He completed his undergraduate degree at Velika škola and military schooling at the Military Academy before pursuing further studies in Vienna, where he graduated from the Geography Department in 1872.

In 1880, the Ministry of National Economy founded a commission to establish a Geography Department in the headquarters of the Serbian General Staff under the direction of Staff Colonel Radovan Miletić who performed the first topographic survey of the entire Kingdom of Serbia from 1881 to 1892 with a team composed of customs officer Kosta Stefanović, engineers Miša Marković and Svetozar Zorić of the Ministry of Engineering.

From 23 February 1891 Colonel Radovan Miletić and Andra Nikolić were elected ministers in the cabinet of Nikola Pašić until 22 August 1892.

Radovan Miletić in his career held the posts of Chief of Staff, Colonel of the General Staff, Chief of the Geographical Department, Chief of the General Staff.

He died in 1919 as a retired politician and officer in Belgrade, Kingdom of Serbia.
