= Military Archives of Serbia =

Serbian military archives

- Војни архив Србије
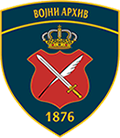

Agency overview
- Formed: 1876; 150 years ago
- Jurisdiction: Ministry of Defence
- Headquarters: Ratka Resanovića 1, Belgrade, Serbia; 44°44′23″N 20°24′31″E
- Website: Official website

The Military Archives of Serbia (Serbian: Војни архив Србије, romanized: Vojni arhiv Srbije), formally the Military Archives of the Ministry of Defence of the Republic of Serbia (Serbian: Војни архив Министарства одбране Републике Србије, romanized: Vojni arhiv Ministarstva odbrane Republike Srbije), are the primary military archives of Serbia, located in Belgrade. The institution was originally established by a decree from Prince Milan Obrenović on 5 February 1876, based on proposal of Jovan Dragašević in 1865. The Military Archives have preserved records of significant events, including the Serbian-Ottoman wars, Balkan Wars, the World War I, and World War II, with approximately 40 million archival records in institutional holdings. The Military Archives are not legally allowed to directly communicate with foreign citizens or organizations. Instead, researchers with foreign citizenship who wish to access its materials must submit their applications via the Serbian diplomatic missions abroad or through their respective embassy in Serbia.

== History ==
The Military Archives were originally established as a department of the General Staff Organization of the Armed Forces of the Principality of Serbia and the Royal Serbian Army. The third department of the General Staff was charged with collecting and documenting war history, organizing it, and ensuring its preservation. This department was also responsible for managing the library and the entire General Staff archives which later evolved into what are now the Military Archives.

On 6 March 1940, a royal decree of the Kingdom of Yugoslavia restructured the History department into the Military History Institute. On 1 March 1945, the Yugoslav People’s Army and the Yugoslav Partisans’ Supreme Commander established History and War Experiment Departments within the Yugoslav Army General Staff, which also included an Archival Department. In January 1946, the History Department was renamed the History Institute of the Yugoslav Army, later becoming the Military Scientific and Publishing Institute in April 1947. From 1949 to 2006, it was known as the Military History Institute, with the Military Archives as part of it.

In 1999, the NATO bombing of Yugoslavia severely damaged the Military Archives, destroying much of its microfilming equipment and conservation laboratory. However, swift actions by the staff saved most of the documents. In 2006, the institution gained independent legal status. In 2018, Croatia requested return of the original documentation produced by the World War II puppet Independent State of Croatia citing the Agreement on Succession Issues of the Former Socialist Federal Republic of Yugoslavia. The Ministry of Defence of Serbia asserted that the original Independent State of Croatia archival materials, organized into 555 boxes, must remain in the Military Archives of Serbia, though copies can be provided based on government agreements and security protocols.

== See also ==
- List of archives in Serbia
- State Archives of Serbia
