= Koželj =

Coordinates: 43.6853°N 22.2006°E

- Village (Selo)
- Interactive map of Koželj
- Country: Serbia
- District: Zaječar District
- Municipality: Knjaževac

Population (2002)
  - Total: 181
- Time zone: UTC+1 (CET)
  - Summer (DST): UTC+2 (CEST)

Koželj is a village in the municipality of Knjaževac, Serbia. According to the 2002 census, the village has a population of 181 people.
