= Lešje, Serbia =

Coordinates: 43.8519°N 21.5303°E

Lešje
- Village
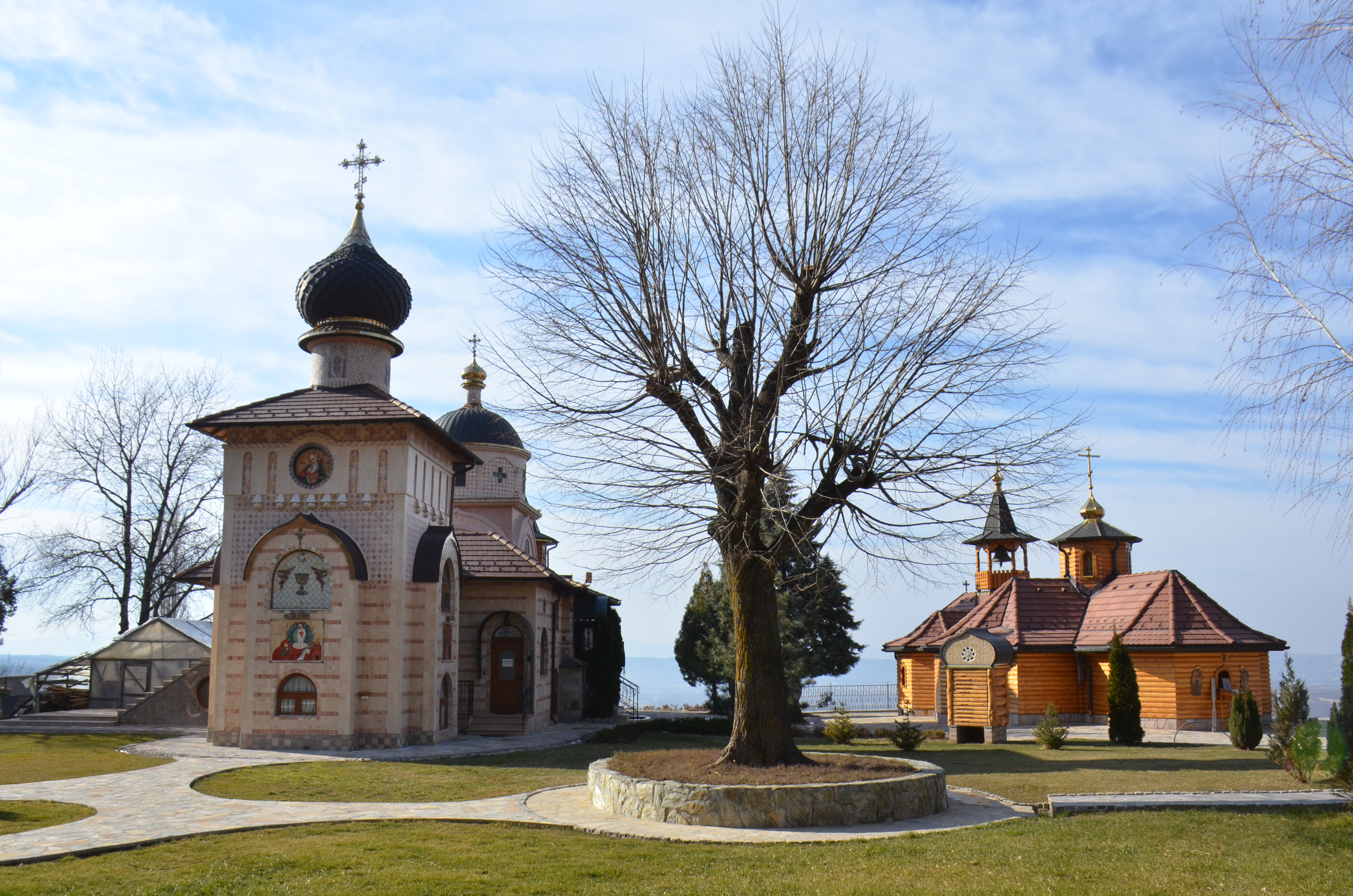
- Lešje monastery
- Interactive map of Lešje
- Country: Serbia
- District: Pomoravlje District
- Municipality: Paraćin

Population (2002)
  - Total: 422
- Time zone: UTC+1 (CET)
  - Summer (DST): UTC+2 (CEST)

Lešje is a village in the municipality of Paraćin, Serbia. According to the 2002 census, the village has a population of 422 people.
