= Ministry of Defence (Serbia) =

Government ministry of Serbia

- Министарство одбране Ministarstvo odbrane
- Emblem of the Ministry of Defence

Ministry overview
- Formed: 10 April 1862; 164 years ago (current form since 2006)
- Jurisdiction: Government of Serbia
- Headquarters: General Staff Building, Birčaninova 5, Belgrade Old General Staff Building, Kneza Miloša 33, Belgrade
- Annual budget: 261.8 billion RSD $2.3 billion (2025)
- Minister responsible: Bratislav Gašić
- Website: mod.gov.rs

The Ministry of Defence (Serbian: Министарство одбране, romanized: Ministarstvo odbrane) is a ministry in the Government of Serbia which is in charge of national defence of Serbia. The current minister is Bratislav Gašić, in office since 2 May 2024.

== Organization ==
The organization of the ministry is as follows:

- Secretariat–General
  - Department for Legal Affairs
  - Department for Financial Affairs
  - Department for Operational Affairs
- General Staff of the Serbian Armed Forces
- Directorate for Defence Policy
  - Department for Strategic Planning
  - Department for International Military Cooperation
- Directorate for Human Resources
  - Department for Personnel
  - Department for Recruitment
  - Department for Veterans and Military Traditions
- Directorate for Material Resources
  - Department for General Logistics
  - Department for Military Technology
    - Military Technical Institute
    - Technical Overhaul Institute "Đurđe Dimitrijević-Đura"
  - Department for Procurement and Sale
- Directorate for Budget and Finances
  - Department for Budget
  - Accounting Center
  - Military Social Security Fund
- Directorate for Infrastructure and Standard of Living
  - Department for Infrastructure
  - Department for Standard of Living
- Directorate for Military Health-care System
  - Military Medical Academy
  - Military Hospital Novi Sad
  - Military Hospital Niš
  - Center for Military Medical Stations
  - Military Ambulance Service
  - Pharmacy Service
  - Veterinary Medicine Service
- Directorate for Public Relations
- Military Attorney's Office
- Defence Inspectorate
- Military Intelligence Agency
- Military Security Agency
- University of Defence
- Military Archives
- Military Museum
- Military Geographic Institute "General Stevan Bošković"

== List of ministers ==
The list includes the ministers of army of the Principality of Serbia and the Kingdom of Serbia from the creation of the post in 1862 to the formation of Yugoslavia after World War I in 1918. The list also includes ministers of defence of the Republic of Serbia from 1991 to 1993, and after the restoration of independence in 2006. For ministers of defence for the 1918–1991 and 1993–2006 periods, see List of ministers of defence of Yugoslavia.

=== Principality of Serbia ===
Minister	Took office	Left office	Prince
Hyppolyte Mondain; Иполит Монден (1811–1900)	10 April 1862	2 April 1865	Mihailo Obrenović
Milivoje Petrović Blaznavac; Миливоје Петровић Блазнавац (1824–1873)	2 April 1865	21 June 1868	Mihailo Obrenović
Jovan Belimarković; Јован Белимарковић (1827–1906)	21 June 1868	10 August 1872	Milan Obrenović
Milivoje Petrović Blaznavac; Миливоје Петровић Блазнавац (1824–1873)	10 August 1872	23 March 1873	Milan Obrenović
Jovan Belimarković; Јован Белимарковић (1827–1906)	23 March 1873	2 April 1873	Milan Obrenović
Milojko Lešjanin; Милојко Лешјанин (1830–1896)	2 April 1873	22 October 1873	Milan Obrenović
Kosta Protić; Коста Протић (1831–1892)	22 October 1873	19 August 1875	Milan Obrenović
Tihomilj Nikolić; Тихомиљ Николић (1832–1886)	19 August 1875	4 November 1876	Milan Obrenović
Sava Grujić; Сава Грујић (1840–1913)	4 November 1876	1 October 1878	Milan Obrenović
Jovan Mišković; Јован Мишковић (1844–1908)	1 October 1878	21 October 1880	Milan Obrenović
Milojko Lešjanin; Милојко Лешјанин (1830–1896)	21 October 1880	12 February 1882	Milan Obrenović

=== Kingdom of Serbia ===
People's Radical Party Serbian Progressive Party Independent Radical Party Non-party

Minister	Took office	Left office	King
Tihomilj Nikolić; Тихомиљ Николић (1832–1886)	12 February 1882	21 September 1883	Milan I
Jovan Petrović; Јован Петровић (1843–1902)	21 September 1883	24 November 1885	Milan I
Dragutin Filipović; Драгутин Филиповић	24 November 1885	23 March 1886	Milan I
Đura Horvatović; Ђура Хорватовић (1835–1895)	23 March 1886	5 February 1887	Milan I
Petar Topalović; Петар Топаловић (1840–1891)	5 February 1887	1 June 1887	Milan I
Antonije Bogićević; Антоније Богићевић (1836–1916); Acting	1 June 1887	5 July 1887	Milan I
Sava Grujić; Сава Грујић (1840–1913)	5 July 1887	14 April 1888	Milan I
Kosta Protić; Коста Протић (1831–1892)	14 April 1888	22 February 1889	Milan I
Dimitrije Đurić; Димитрије Ђурић (1838–1893)	22 February 1889	16 March 1890	Alexander I
Sava Grujić; Сава Грујић (1840–1913)	16 March 1890	11 February 1891	Alexander I
Radovan Miletić; Радован Милетић (1844–1919)	11 February 1891	7 May 1891	Alexander I
Jovan Praporčetović; Јован Прапорчетовић	7 May 1891	21 March 1892	Alexander I
Dimitrije Đurić; Димитрије Ђурић (1838–1893)	21 March 1892	9 August 1892	Alexander I
Antonije Bogićević; Антоније Богићевић (1836–1916)	9 August 1892	1 April 1893	Alexander I
Dragutin Franasović; Драгутин Франасовић (1842–1914)	1 April 1893	4 June 1893	Alexander I
Sava Grujić; Сава Грујић (1840–1913)	4 June 1893	12 January 1894	Alexander I
Milovan Pavlović; Милован Павловић (1842–1903)	12 January 1894	25 June 1895	Alexander I
Dragutin Franasović; Драгутин Франасовић (1842–1914)	25 June 1895	17 December 1896	Alexander I
Jovan Mišković; Јован Мишковић (1844–1908)	17 December 1896	11 October 1897	Alexander I
Dragomir Vučković; Драгомир Вучковић (1844–1899)	11 October 1897	10 December 1899	Alexander I
Jovan Atanacković; Јован Атанацковић (1848–1921)	10 December 1899	12 July 1900	Alexander I
Miloš Vasić; Милош Васић (1859–1935)	12 July 1900	27 April 1901	Alexander I
Božidar Janković; Божидар Јанковић (1849–1920)	27 April 1901	3 August 1901	Alexander I
Čedomilj Miljković; Чедомиљ Миљковић	3 August 1901	21 December 1901	Alexander I
Vasilije Antonić; Василије Антонић (1860–1929)	21 December 1901	7 October 1902	Alexander I
Milovan Pavlović; Милован Павловић (1842–1903)	7 October 1902	29 May 1903	Alexander I
Jovan Atanacković; Јован Атанацковић (1848–1921)	29 May 1903	2 August 1903	Peter I
Leonid Solarević; Леонид Соларевић (1854–1929)	2 August 1903	21 September 1903	Peter I
Milan Andrejević; Милан Андрејевић (1853–1916)	21 September 1903	26 January 1904	Peter I
Radomir Putnik; Радомир Путник (1847–1917)	26 January 1904	16 May 1905	Peter I
Vasilije Antonić; Василије Антонић (1860–1929)	16 May 1905	1 March 1906	Peter I
Sava Grujić; Сава Грујић (1840–1913)	1 March 1906	17 April 1906	Peter I
Radomir Putnik; Радомир Путник (1847–1917)	17 April 1906	30 March 1908	Peter I
Stepa Stepanović; Степа Степановић (1856–1929)	30 March 1908	23 December 1908	Peter I
Mihailo Živković; Михаило Живковић (1856–1930)	23 December 1908	1 October 1909	Peter I
Ljubomir Stojanović; Љубомир Стојановић (1860–1930); Acting	1 October 1909	11 October 1909	Peter I
Milutin Marinović; Милутин Мариновић (1861–1941)	11 October 1909	4 March 1910	Peter I
Ilija Gojković; Илија Гојковић (1854–1917)	4 March 1910	24 February 1911	Peter I
Stepa Stepanović; Степа Степановић (1856–1929)	24 February 1911	22 May 1912	Peter I
Radomir Putnik; Радомир Путник (1847–1917)	22 May 1912	19 September 1912	Peter I
Radivoje Bojović; Радивоје Бојовић (1864–1948)	19 September 1912	3 January 1913	Peter I
Miloš Božanović; Милош Божановић (1863–1922)	3 January 1913	4 January 1914	Peter I
Dušan Stefanović; Душан Стефановић (1870–1951)	4 January 1914	22 November 1914	Peter I
Nikola Pašić; Никола Пашић (1845–1926); Acting	22 November 1914	14 December 1914	Peter I
Radivoje Bojović; Радивоје Бојовић (1864–1948)	14 December 1914	6 December 1915	Peter I
Božidar Terzić; Божидар Терзић (1867–1939)	6 December 1915	31 May 1918	Peter I
Stojan Protić; Стојан Протић (1857–1923); Acting	31 May 1918	24 June 1918	Peter I
Mihailo Rašić; Михаило Рашић (1858–1932)	24 June 1918	1 December 1918	Peter I

=== Republic of Serbia ===
Political Party: n-p DS SNS PS

No.	Portrait	Minister	Took office	Left office	Time in office	Party	Cabinet
1	Miodrag Jokić	Miodrag Jokić (1935–2022)	11 February 1991	31 July 1991	170 days	Independent	Zelenović
2	Tomislav Simović	Tomislav Simović (1934–2026)	31 July 1991	23 December 1991	145 days	Independent	Zelenović
3	Marko Negovanović	Marko Negovanović (1935–2023)	23 December 1991	6 November 1993	1 year, 318 days	Independent	Božović; Šainović
Part of Ministry of Defence of FR Yugoslavia and the State Union of Serbia and Montenegro
4	Zoran Stanković	Zoran Stanković (1954–2021)	4 June 2006	15 May 2007	345 days	Independent	Koštunica I
5	Dragan Šutanovac	Dragan Šutanovac (born 1968)	15 May 2007	27 July 2012	5 years, 73 days	DS	Koštunica II; Cvetković
6	Aleksandar Vučić	Aleksandar Vučić (born 1970)	27 July 2012	2 September 2013	1 year, 37 days	SNS	Dačić
7	Nebojša Rodić	Nebojša Rodić (born 1953)	2 September 2013	27 April 2014	237 days	SNS	Dačić
8	Bratislav Gašić	Bratislav Gašić (born 1967)	27 April 2014	5 February 2016	1 year, 284 days	SNS	Vučić I
–	Dušan Vujović	Dušan Vujović (1951–2025); Acting	5 February 2016	2 March 2016	26 days	Independent	Vučić I
9	Zoran Đorđević	Zoran Đorđević (born 1970)	2 March 2016	29 June 2017	1 year, 119 days	SNS	Vučić I–II
10	Aleksandar Vulin	Aleksandar Vulin (born 1972)	29 June 2017	28 October 2020	3 years, 121 days	PS	Brnabić
11	Nebojša Stefanović	Nebojša Stefanović (born 1976)	28 October 2020	26 October 2022	1 year, 363 days	SNS	Brnabić II
12	Miloš Vučević	Miloš Vučević (born 1974)	26 October 2022	2 May 2024	1 year, 189 days	SNS	Brnabić III
(8)	Bratislav Gašić	Bratislav Gašić (born 1967)	2 May 2024	Incumbent	2 years, 182 days	SNS	Vučević; Macut
