= Milojko Lešjanin =

Serbian military officer and politician

General Milojko Lešjanin
- Serbian Cyrillic: Милојко Лешјанин
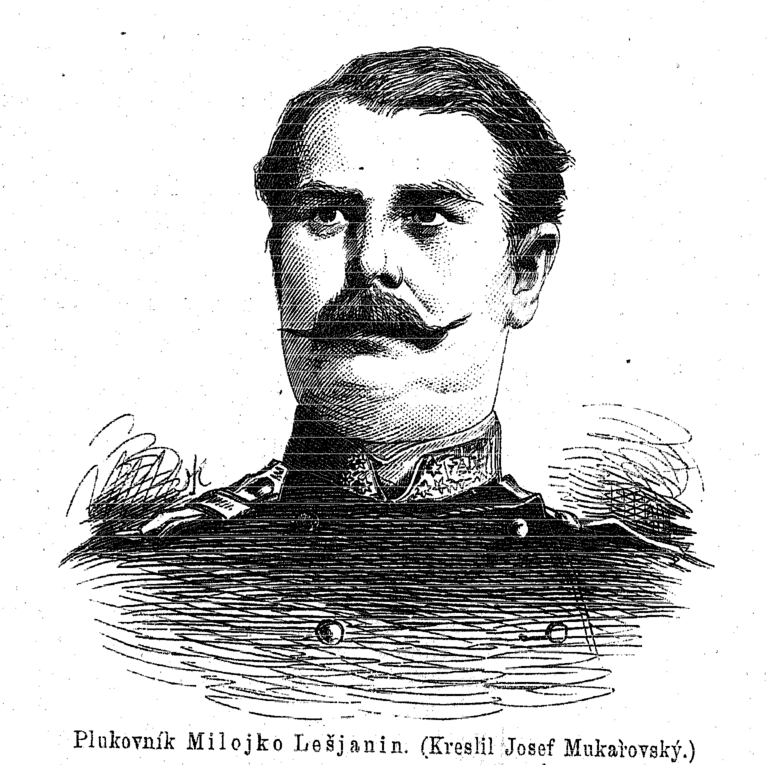
- Lešjanin portrayed by Josef Mukařovský and depicted in Světozor, 28 July 1876.
- Born: January 15, 1830; Lešje, Principality of Serbia
- Died: February 15, 1896 (aged 66); Belgrade, Kingdom of Serbia
- Military career
- Allegiance: Principality of Serbia; Kingdom of Serbia
- Branch: Armed Forces of the Principality of Serbia; Royal Serbian Army
- Service years: 1849–1888
- Rank: General
- Commands: Military Academy; Timok Army/Corps; Morava Corps; General Staff
- Conflicts: Serbian–Turkish Wars (1876–1878); Serbo-Bulgarian War
- Other work: Minister of Army

Milojko Lešjanin (Serbian Cyrillic: Милојко Лешјанин; Lešje, 15 February 1830 – Belgrade, 15 February 1896) was a Serbian military officer and politician. He served as Minister of Army and Chief of the Serbian General Staff for several times in the 1870s and 1880s. As corps and army commander he took part in the wars with Ottoman Turks and Bulgarians in 1876–1885. He led the Serbian troops at the liberation of Niš in 1877 (together with Jovan Belimarković) and at the blockade of Vidin in 1885. He also served as Chief of the Military Academy of Serbia for several times in the 1860s and 1880s.

== Biography ==
=== Education and teaching career ===
The son of a merchant from Lešje (near Paraćin), Lešjanin joined the Armed forces of the Principality of Serbia in 1849. He graduated from the Artillery School (modern Military Academy) in Belgrade as a lieutenant in engineering, and later completed a three-year course at the Prussian Staff College in Berlin and a one-year internship at the Prussian General Staff.

After his return to his homeland, he was a longtime teacher (between 1859 and 1880, intermittently) at the Artillery School, and served three times (1865–1868, 1874–1875, June–November 1880) as its Chief. In 1870 (now with the rank of major) he was again in the Prussian General Staff, this time as an observer of the fighting in the Franco-Prussian War. He witnessed the sieges of Metz and Strasbourg.

=== Military career ===
In 1862, during the bombardment of Belgrade by the Ottoman Turks, Lešjanin commanded a section of the defence and was promoted to the rank of captain I class. At the beginning of the First Serbian–Turkish War in the summer of 1876, Lešjanin (who was promoted to the rank of colonel the previous year) commanded the Timok Army, which aimed to invade the northwestern Ottoman Bulgaria and to raise the Bulgarians in revolt. His attempt to accomplish this task was thwarted by the Turks; Lešjanin then ceded command to the Imperial Russian Army general Mikhail Chernyayev. At Veliki Izvor, Lešjanin led the Zaječar detachment on the left flank of the Serbian troops. The battle ended in defeat for the Serbs, who were soon forced to abandon Zaječar to the Turks.

During the Second Serbian–Turkish War in the winter of 1877–1878, Colonel Lešjanin was commander of the Morava Corps (16,715 soldiers and 46 cannons), advancing on both banks of South Morava and took part in the operations (29 December 1877 – 11 January 1878) that led to the capture of Niš. After this success, Lešjanin was entrusted with the joint command of the Morava and Timok Corps to take over Pristina. He failed to accomplish this task due to unsuccessful assault on Turkish–Albanian positions near Samokovo. In February 1878 he was a special envoy of the Prince Milan Obernović to the Russian headquarters in San Stefano (modern Yeşilköy) for the negotiations that led to the Treaty of San Stefano, unfavorable for Serbia.

Upon his return from San Stefano, Lešjanin was promoted to the rank of general. He commanded the Timok Corps, and in 1879–1880 and 1882–1885 he was Chief of the Serbian General Staff, and in 1883–1884 he was also the commander of the active army. In the Serbo-Bulgarian War in November 1885, General Lešjanin commanded the Timok Army during the unsuccessful siege of Vidin. After the war, Lešjanin took over the leadership of the General Staff for the third time, in 1886–1888; afterwards, he left the Royal Serbian Army and entered politics.

In 1888 he replaced Đorđe Simić as president of The Red Cross of Serbia. His tenure lasted from 1888 to 1896 when he was succeeded by General Jovan Mišković.

=== Political career ===
Lešjanin became Minister of Army for the first time in 1873, when he entered the Liberal government headed by Jovan Ristić. From 1880 to 1882 he held the same position in the Progressive government of Milan Piroćanac. After his dismissal, he participated in the drafting of the Constitution of 1888 and in the work of the Parliament (representing the Liberal Party) in the early 1890s.

== Sources ==
- Chief of the General Staff: 1876–2000, Ivetić Velimir, Belgrade 2000.

Military offices
| Preceded by František Zach | Chief of the Military Academy; 1865–1868 | Succeeded by František Zach |
| Preceded by František Zach | Chief of the Military Academy; 1874–1875 | Succeeded by Ljubomir Ivanović |
| Preceded by Kosta Protić | Chief of the Serbian General Staff; 1879–1880 | Succeeded by Jovan Andjelković |
| Preceded by Stevan Zdravković | Chief of the Military Academy; 1880 | Succeeded by Stevan Zdravković |
| Preceded by Jovan Andjelković | Chief of the Serbian General Staff; 1882–1885 | Succeeded by Himself |
| Preceded by Himself | Chief of the Serbian General Staff; 1886–1888 | Succeeded by Jovan Mišković |
Political offices
| Preceded by Jovan Belimarković | Minister of Army; 1873 | Succeeded by Kosta Protić |
| Preceded by Jovan Mišković | Minister of Army; 1880–1882 | Succeeded by Tihomilj Nikolić |
