= Dragomir Vučković =

Serbian colonel and politician (1844–1899)

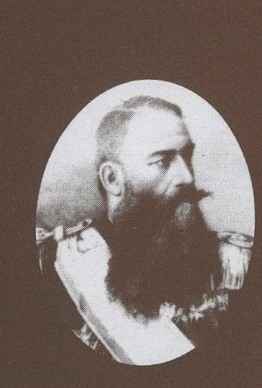
Dragomir Vučković

Dragomir Vučković (Serbian Cyrillic: Пуковник Драгомир Вучковић; 1844 – 10 December 1899) was a Serbian colonel who participated in the Serbian-Turkish Wars and the Serbo-Bulgarian War of 1885. As Minister of the Army, he was heavily involved in the modernisation of the Serbian Army.

In 1874, he served as an adjutant to Colonel Radovan Miletić before and during the Serbian-Turkish Wars. He then served as Minister of the Army of Serbia in the Ministry of Defence from 11 October 1897 until his death. During that period, he was part of the Cabinet of Vladan Đorđević.

On 10 December 1899, Vučković died in Belgrade due to a sudden heart attack during transit.
