= Jovan Belimarković =

Serbian general and politician (1827–1906)

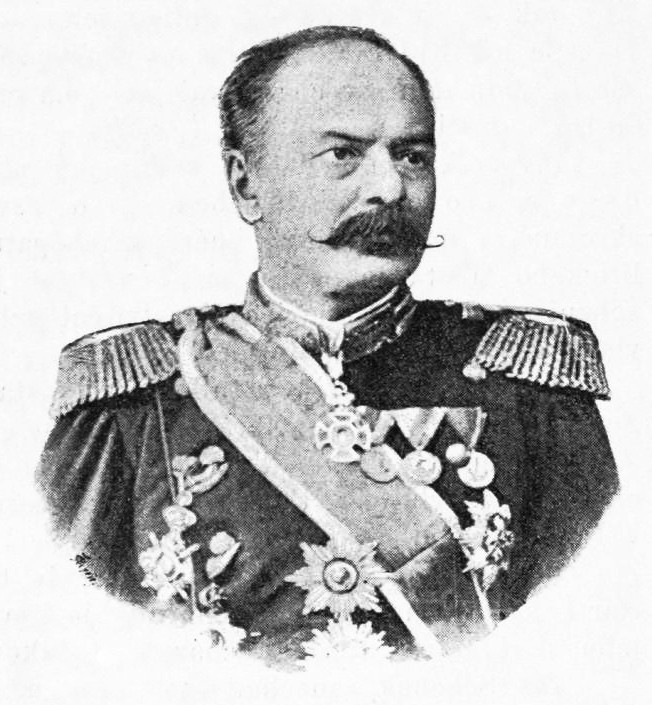
- 1889 photograph by Milan Jovanović
- Born: 1 January 1827; Belgrade, Principality of Serbia
- Died: 16 August 1906 (aged 79); Vrnjačka Banja, Kingdom of Serbia
- Occupations: general and politician

Jovan Belimarković (Serbian Cyrillic: Јован Белимарковић, 1827–1906), was a Serbian general and politician.

Belimarković was born on January 1, 1827, in Belgrade, Principality of Serbia. He finished military school in Berlin.

He was awarded Order of Prince Danilo I, Order of the Cross of Takovo, Order of Miloš the Great and other decorations.

== Military career ==
- Bombing of Belgrade (1862)
- Serbian–Ottoman War (1876–78)
  - Liberation of Vranje

Government offices
Preceded by Milivoje Petrović Blaznavac	Minister of Defence; 1868–1872	Succeeded by Milivoje Petrović Blaznavac
Preceded by Milivoje Petrović Blaznavac	Minister of Defence; 1873	Succeeded by Milojko Lešjanin
