= Order of the Cross of Takovo =

Order of the Cross of Takovo Орден Таковског крста
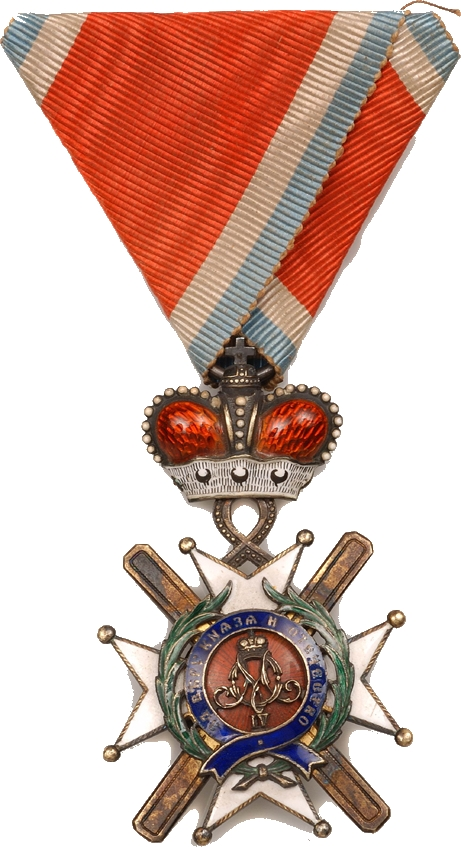
- Order of the Cross of Takovo
- Type: State order
- Awarded for: unknown
- Presented by: Principality of Serbia; Kingdom of Serbia
- Eligibility: distinguished military veterans
- Status: discontinued
- Established: 1865
- First award: 1865
- Final award: 1903

Highlights
- Total: unknown
- Ribbon of the order

Precedence
- Next (higher): None (before 1883); Order of the White Eagle (1883-1903)
- Next (lower): None (before 1883); Order of St. Sava (1883-1903)

The Order of the Cross of Takovo (Serbian: Орден Таковског крста, romanized: Orden Takovskog krsta) was a Serbian state order.

== History ==
It was instituted in the Principality of Serbia in 1865 to mark the 50th anniversary of the Second Serbian Uprising against the Ottoman Empire, which had started with the Takovo Meeting.

The decree that established the Cross and Silver Medal was signed on 22 May 1865 by Mihailo Obrenović, Prince of Serbia. The Order was suppressed in 1903.

== Notable recipients ==
- Albert I of Belgium
- Archduke Albrecht, Duke of Teschen
- Alexander of Battenberg
- Alfred, Duke of Saxe-Coburg and Gotha
- Jovan Belimarković
- Petar Bojović
- Count Otto von Bray-Steinburg
- Vlaho Bukovac
- Mikhail Chernyayev
- Dimitrije Cincar-Marković
- Nićifor Dučić
- Dimitrije Đurić
- Grand Duke Dmitry Konstantinovich of Russia
- Ernest II, Duke of Saxe-Coburg and Gotha
- Ernst I, Duke of Saxe-Altenburg
- Gaston Errembault de Dudzeele (died 1929)
- Géza Fejérváry
- Franz Joseph I of Austria
- Frederick III, German Emperor
- Jevrem Grujić
- Iosif Gurko
- Wilhelm von Hahnke
- Paul von Hatzfeldt
- David Edward Hughes
- Sima Igumanov
- Paulina Irby
- Nikola Ivanov
- Joachim III of Constantinople
- Count Gustav Kálnoky
- John Mākini Kapena
- Gustav von Kessel
- Konstantin of Hohenlohe-Schillingsfürst
- Hermann Kövess von Kövessháza
- Franz Kuhn von Kuhnenfeld
- Leopold II of Belgium
- Prince Leopold of Bavaria
- Louis IV, Grand Duke of Hesse
- Archduke Ludwig Viktor of Austria
- Luís I of Portugal
- Aleksandar Mašin
- Charles McLaren, 1st Baron Aberconway
- Čedomilj Mijatović
- Milan I of Serbia
- Milan Milićević
- Prince Mirko of Montenegro
- Živojin Mišić
- Dumitru C. Moruzi
- Nicholas I of Montenegro
- Artur Nepokoychitsky
- Petar Perunović
- Racho Petrov
- Constantin Poenaru
- Constantin Prezan
- Radomir Putnik
- Alexander Arkadyevich Suvorov
- Dmitry Milyutin
- Eduard Totleben
- Fyodor Eduardovich Keller
- Fyodor Radetsky
- Fyodor Trepov (senior)
- Grand Duke Nicholas Nikolaevich of Russia (1856–1929)
- Grand Duke Vladimir Alexandrovich of Russia
- Illarion Vorontsov-Dashkov
- Kalākaua
- Konstantin von Stackelberg
- Mikhail Annenkov
- Mikhail Dragomirov
- Nikolai Obruchev
- Terty Filippov
- Viktor Sakharov
- Rudolf, Crown Prince of Austria
- Mikhail Skobelev
- Leonid Solarević
- Stepa Stepanović
- Rudolf Stöger-Steiner von Steinstätten
- Dejan Subotić
- Eduard Taaffe, 11th Viscount Taaffe
- Queen Victoria
- Sergei Witte
- Pavel Zelenoy

== Gallery ==
=== Description ===
Elements of the decoration of the Order of the mark and the stars:

Coat of arms of the Principality of Serbia

Maltese cross

Saint Andrew's Cross

=== Order insignia ===
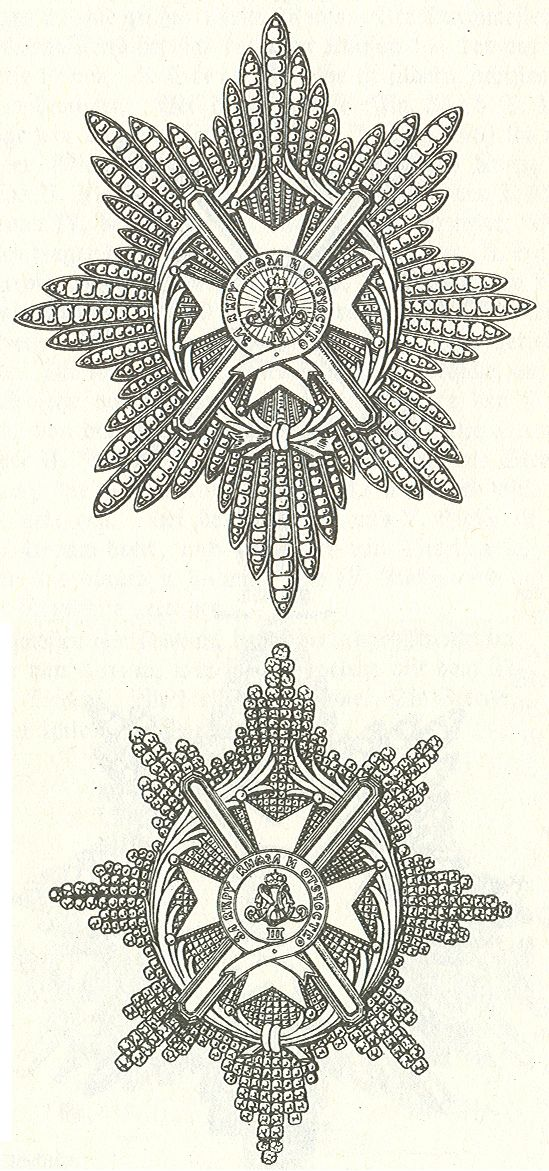
Stars of the order

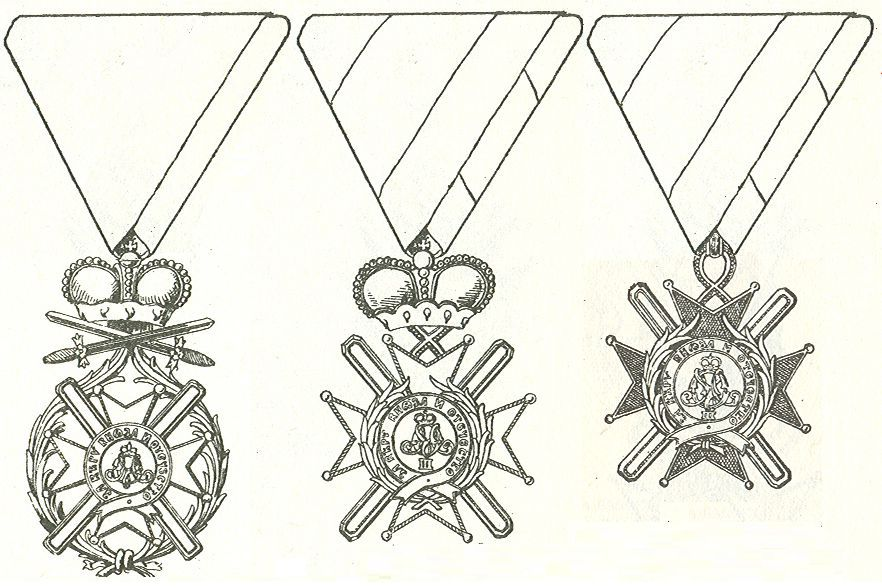
Crosses of the order
