= 224th Center for Electronic Action =

- 224. Центар за електронска дејства
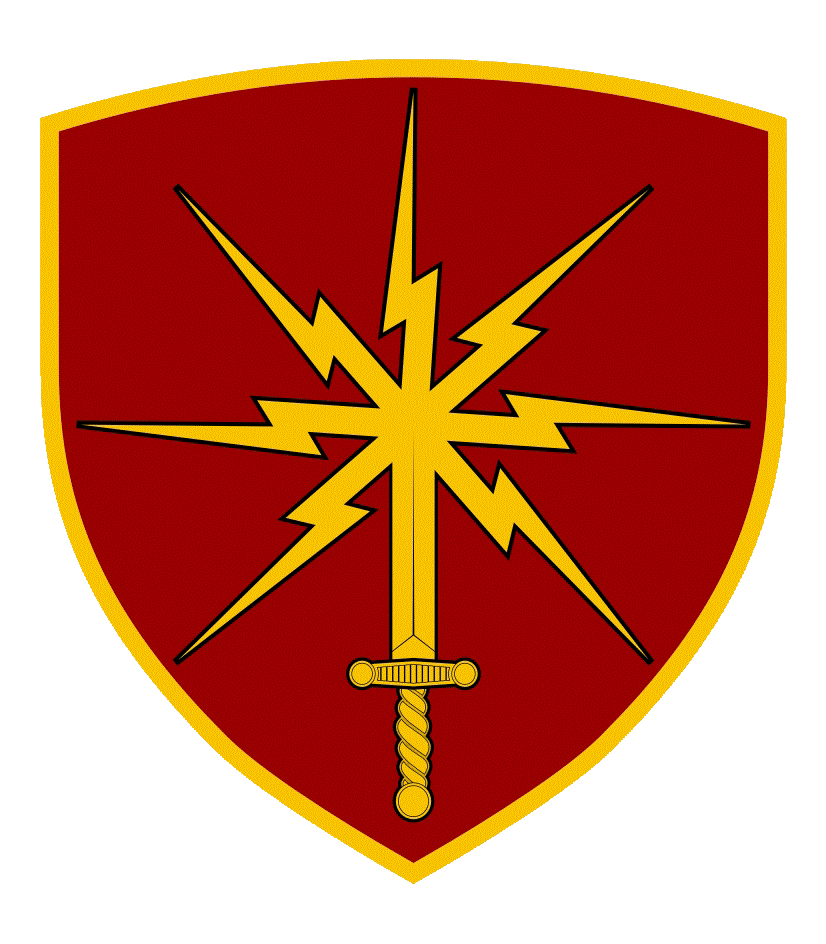
- Active: 1946 – present
- Country: Serbia
- Branch: Serbian General Staff
- Type: Electronic warfare
- Part of: Serbian Armed Forces
- Garrison/HQ: Banjica (Belgrade)
- Anniversaries: 11 November

Commanders
- Current commander: Colonel Veselin Jelovac

The 224th Center for Electronic Action (Serbian: 224. Центар за електронска дејства, romanized: 224. Centar za elektronska dejstva) is unit of the Serbian Armed Forces directly subordinated to the Intelligence and Reconnaissance Directorate of the General Staff. The main duty of the center is to plan, organize and conduct all aspects of electronic warfare.

== Structure ==
The 224th Center for Electronic Action consists of command platoon and 2 battalions:

- Command platoon
- 1st Electronic Warfare Battalion
- 2nd Electronic Warfare Battalion

== Equipment ==
The unit is equipped with gamma of modern Russian electronic warfare systems: Krasukha (including both Krasukha-2 and Krasukha-4), Moskva-1, and Repellent-1.

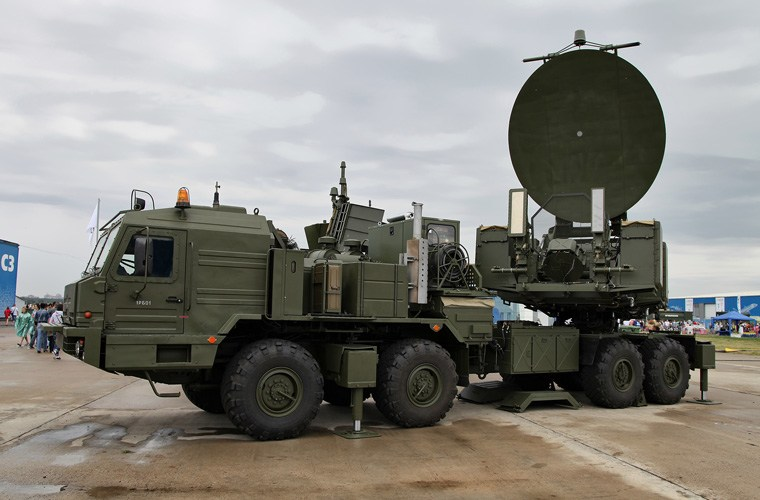
Krasukha-2

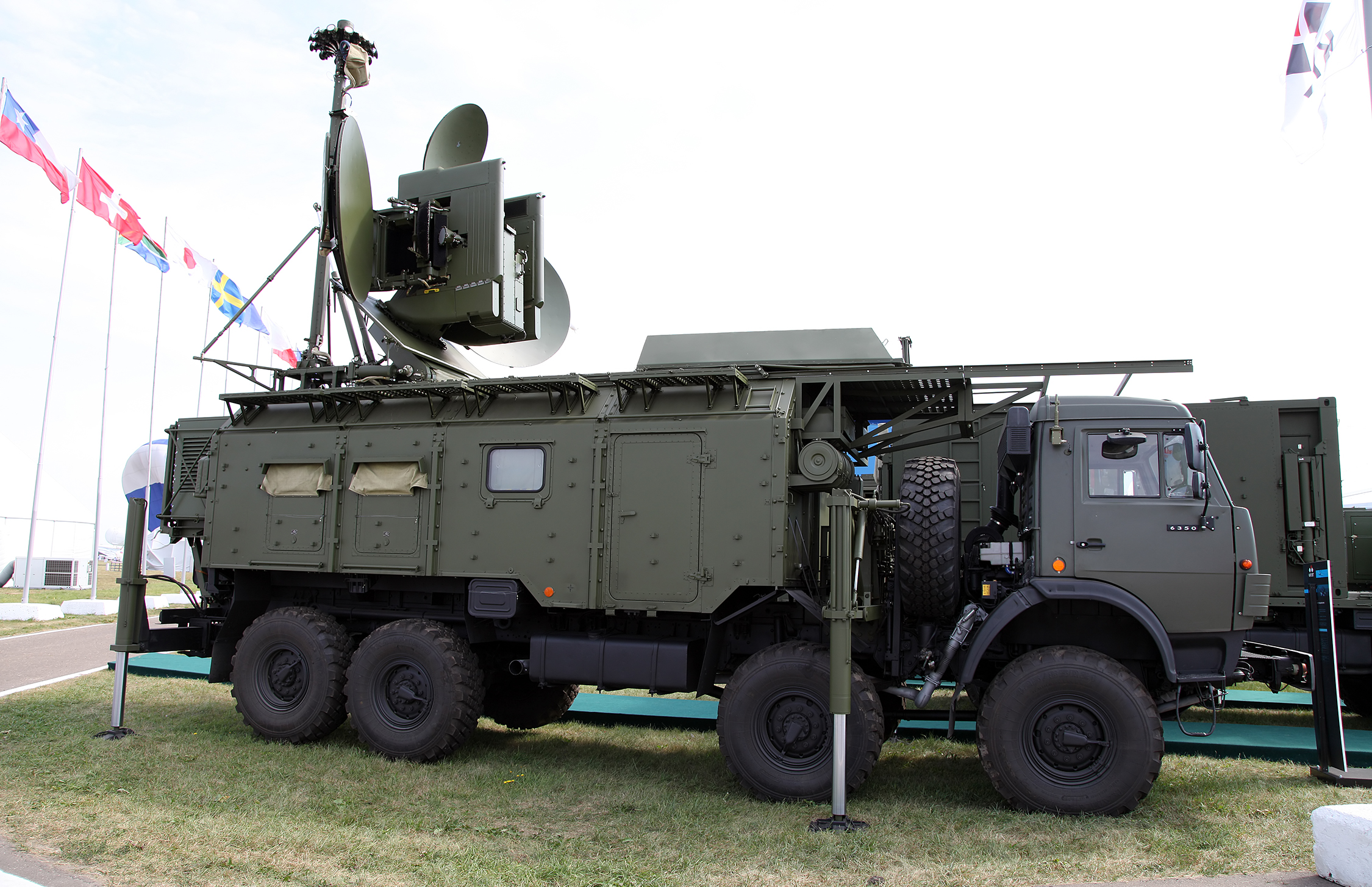
Krasukha-4

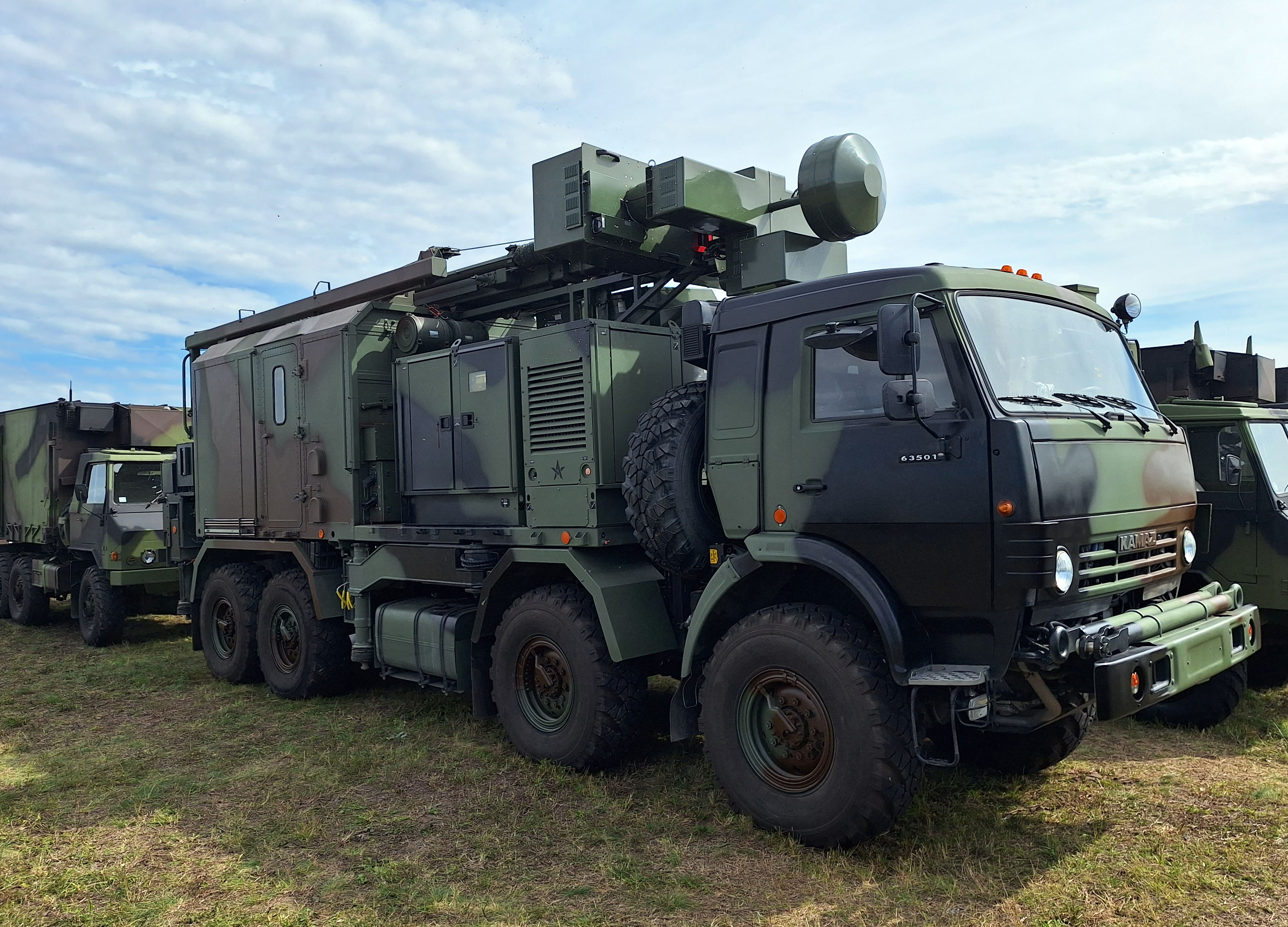
Repellent-1
