= Joint operations =

Joint operations can mean:

- Joint warfare, the basis of modern military doctrine
  - More loosely, Combined arms, an element of joint warfare
- Literal operations on joints of the body, see Orthopedic surgery
- Joint Operations: Typhoon Rising, a video game, and its expansion packs

== See also ==
- Joint Operations Cell, a British law enforcement collaboration
- Joint Operations Division, component of the South African National Defence Force
- Joint Operations Command (disambiguation), the name of numerous military organizations
