= JOC =

JOC may refer to:

- Japanese Olympic Committee, the national Olympic committee in Japan for the Olympic Games movement
- Young Christian Workers (Jeunesse ouvrière chrétienne in French), an international Catholic organization of the Young Trade Unionists
- Joint Operations Command (disambiguation), various military organisations
- The Journal of Organic Chemistry, a peer-reviewed scientific journal
- JOC Group Inc., a provider of information on international trade, trade, and logistics professionals.

Joc may refer to:

- Joc dance ensemble, Moldovan republic
- Joc Pederson (born 1992), American professional baseball outfielder
- Joc Simmons, American tennis player in the 1990s
- Yung Joc, stage name of American rapper Jasiel Amon Robinson (born 1983)

JoC may refer to:

- Jews of color, a neologism that describes Jews from non-white racial and ethnic backgrounds
