= Intelligence and Reconnaissance Directorate =

Intelligence and Reconnaissance Directorate of the Serbian General Staff
- Управа за обавештајно-извиђачке послове Генералштаба Војске Србије

Agency overview
- Formed: 1884 (current form since 2004)
- Preceding agency: Intelligence Directorate of the General Staff
- Headquarters: Belgrade
- Agency executive: Brig. general Miroljub Čupić
- Parent agency: Serbian General Staff

The Intelligence and Reconnaissance Directorate of the Serbian General Staff (Serbian: Управа за обавештајно-извиђачке послове Генералштаба Војске Србије, romanized: Uprava za obaveštajno-izviđačke poslove Generalštaba Vojske Srbije) is a military intelligence unit of the Serbian Armed Forces subordinated to the General Staff. It provides operational and tactical intelligence on various topics relating to the defense of the country, including electronic warfare.

The 224th Center for Electronic Action and Military Geographic Institute are under the direct command of the Intelligence and Reconnaissance Directorate.

== See also ==
- Serbian Armed Forces
- Military Intelligence Agency
- Military Security Agency
