= Serbian General Staff =

Highest staff organization in the Serbian Armed Forces

General Staff of the Serbian Armed Forces
- Генералштаб Војске Србије
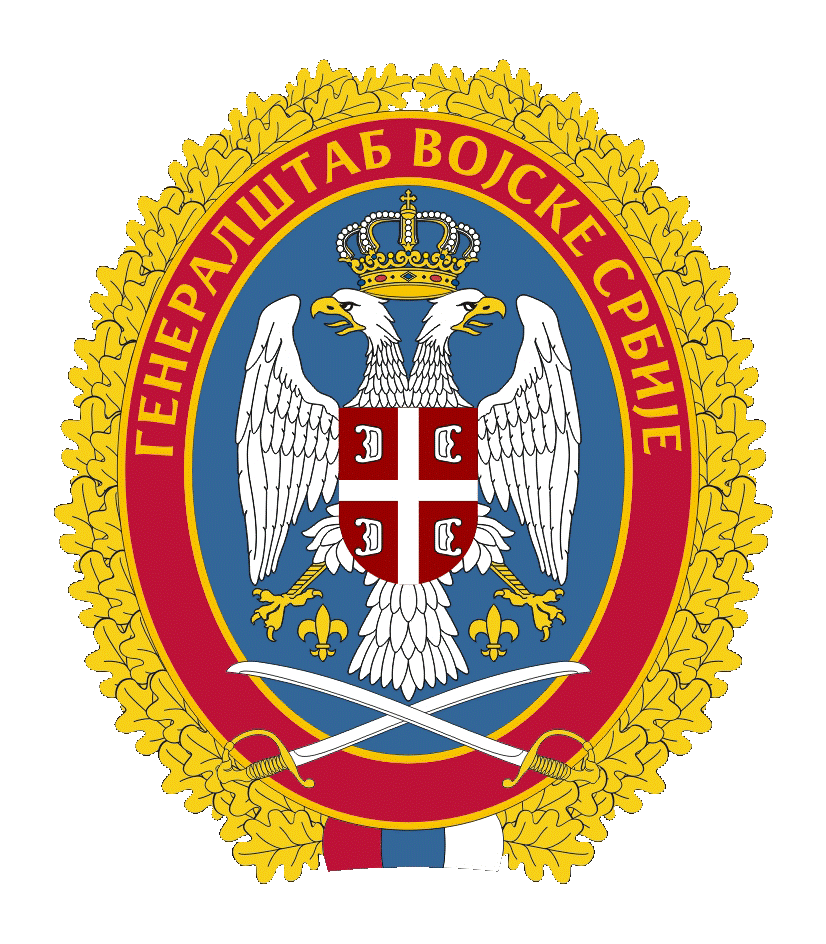
- Emblem of the Serbian General Staff
- Active: 1876–present (current form since 2006)
- Country: Serbia
- Type: Staff
- Size: 4,300 (Note: The figure includes all brigades and organizational entities directly subordinated to the General Staff.)
- Part of: Serbian Armed Forces
- Garrison/HQ: Dedinje (Belgrade)
- Website: Official website

Commanders
- Chief of the General Staff: Lt. Col. General Tiosav Janković (acting)
- Deputy Chief of the General Staff: Vacant
- Notable commanders: General František Zach; Field Marshal Radomir Putnik; Field Marshal Stepa Stepanović; Field Marshal Živojin Mišić; Field Marshal Petar Bojović

The General Staff of the Serbian Armed Forces (Serbian: Генералштаб Војске Србије, romanized: Generalštab Vojske Srbije) is the highest authority within the Serbian Armed Forces and a significant command entity with numerous organizational units under its direct command.

== Missions ==
General Staff possess operational authority over the armed forces. Its primary roles and responsibilities include:

- developing the command structure
- establishing a plan of recruitment and schedule for recruits
- regulating training of the armed forces
- establishing plans for education and training,
- performing other tasks determined by law.

== Composition ==
=== Members ===
Members of six most senior ranking officers who make strategic and tactical preparations and procedures for use during peacetime and war.

Position	Portrait	Name	Rank	Service branch
Chief of the General Staff (acting)		Tiosav Janković	Lt. Col. General	Air Force
Deputy Chief of the General Staff				
Commander of the Army		Zoran Nasković	Maj. general	Army
Commander of the Air Force and Air Defence		Tiosav Janković	Lt. Col. General	Air Force
Training Commander		Vladan Milosavljević	Maj. general	Army
Commander of the Guard		Vladimir Vukajlović	Brig. general	Army

== Structure ==
Special Forces Guard Signal Brigade Central Logistics Base
Military Police Directorate Intelligence and Reconnaissance Directorate

There are various brigades and brigade-size entities directly subordinated to the General Staff, including two brigades of the special forces (thus reducing reaction time when need arise for their operational use).

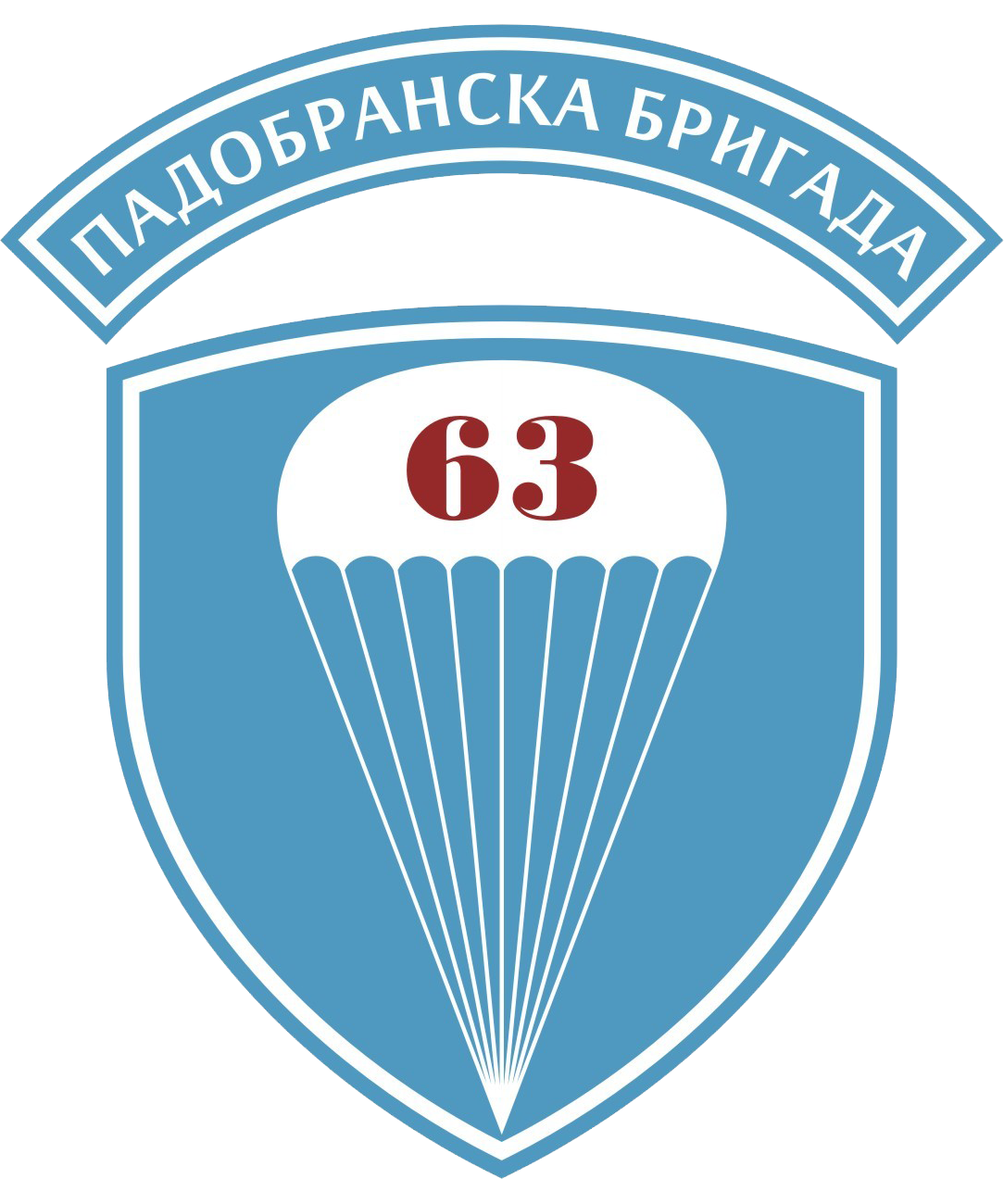
- 63rd Parachute Brigade
- 72nd Brigade for Special Operations
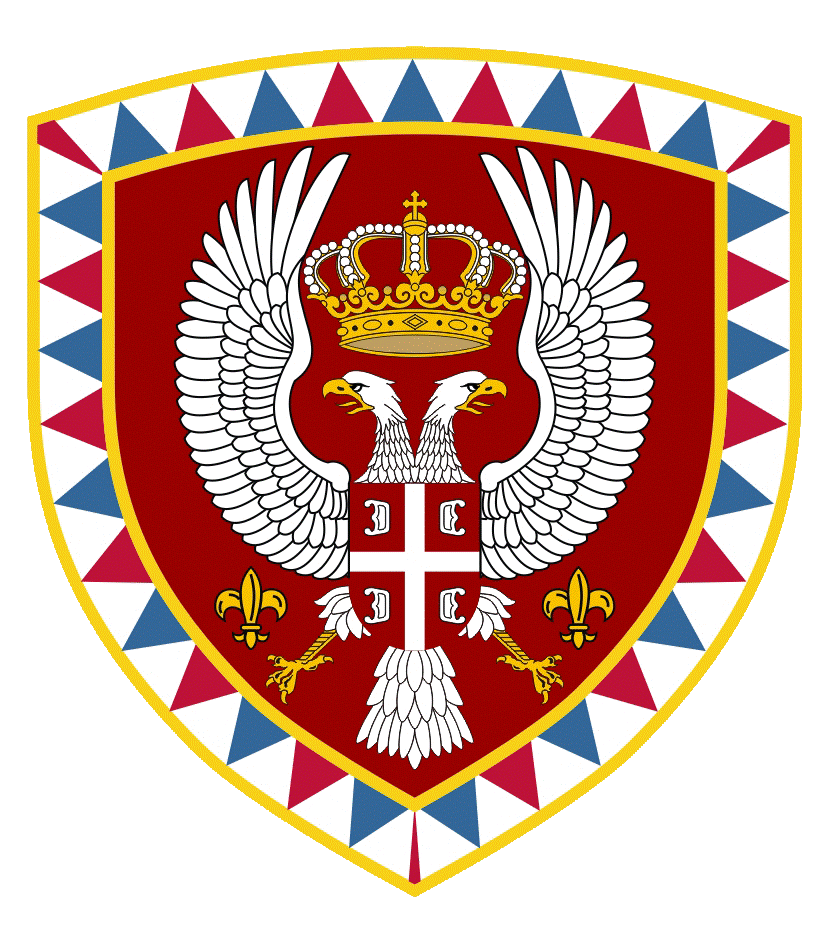
- Guard
  - Command Battalion (Belgrade)
  - Honor Guard Battalion (Belgrade)
  - 25th Military Police Battalion (Belgrade)
  - Logistics Battalion (Belgrade)
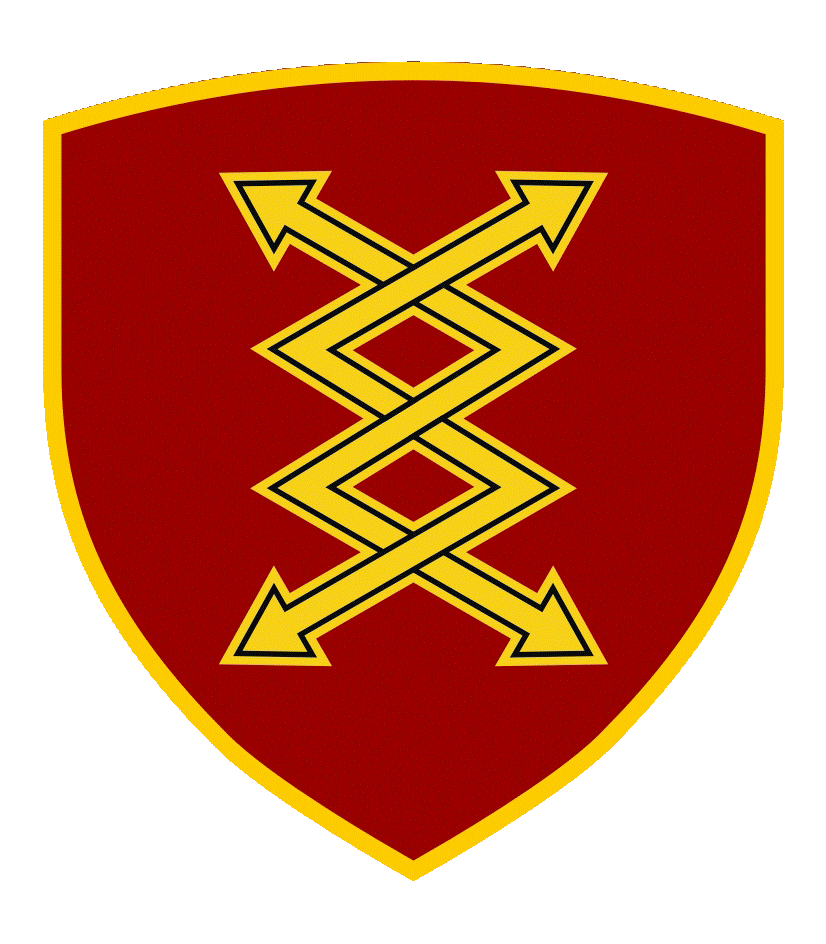
- Signal Brigade
  - Command Platoon (Belgrade)
  - 1st Signal Battalion (Belgrade)
  - 2nd Signal Battalion (Belgrade)
  - 3rd Signal Battalion (Belgrade)
  - 4th Signal Battalion (Belgrade)
- Central Logistics Base
  - Command Company (Belgrade)
  - 1st Logistics Center (Belgrade)
  - 1st Depot Battalion (Gornji Milanovac)
  - 2nd Depot Battalion (Kragujevac)
  - 3rd Depot Battalion (Niš)
  - 2nd Retail Center (Niš)
- Technical Testing Center
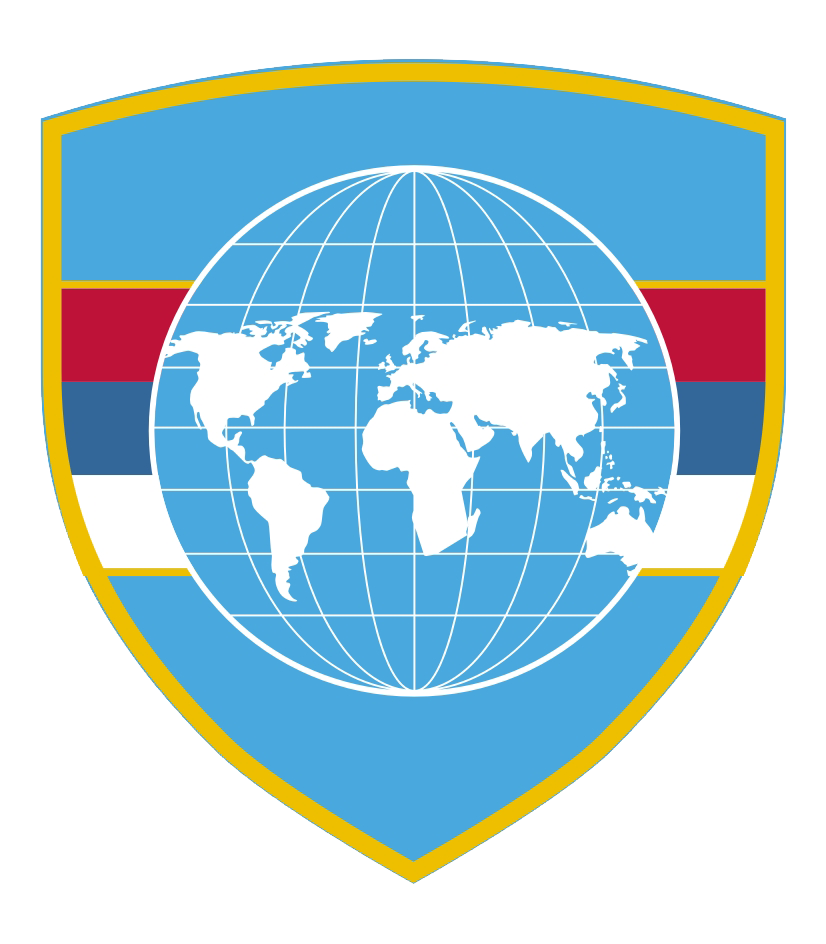
- Peacekeeping Operations Center
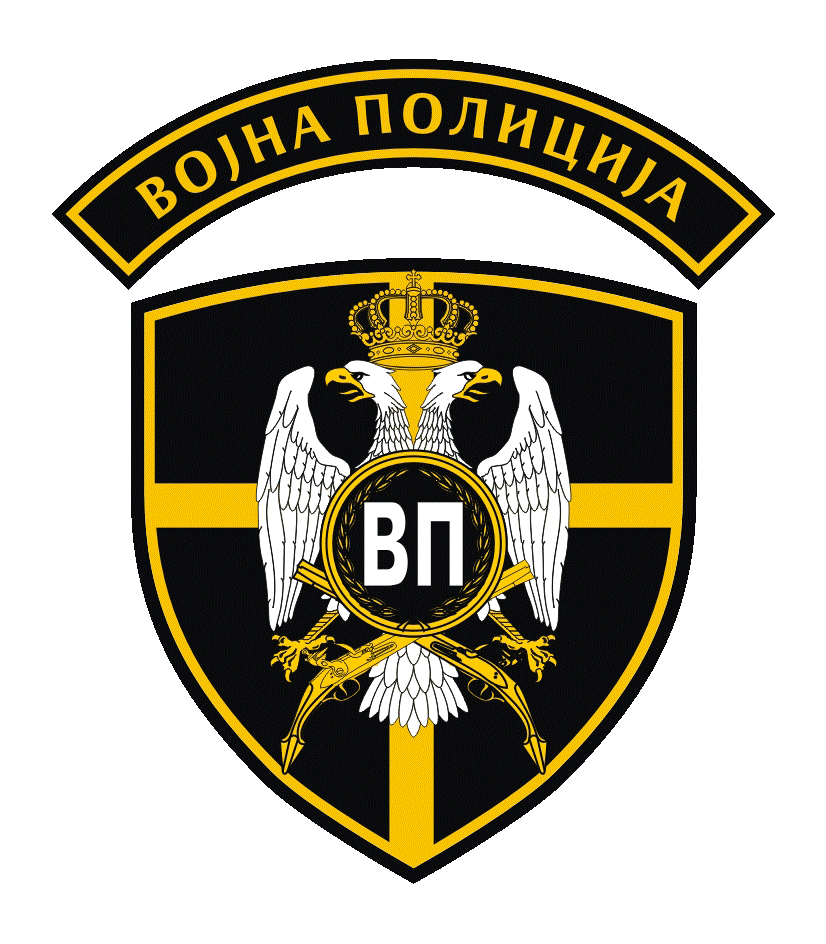
- Military Police Directorate
  - Criminal Investigative Group
  - MP Special Operations Detachment "Cobras"
- Intelligence and Reconnaissance Directorate
  - 224th Center for Electronic Action
  - Military Geographic Institute "General Stevan Bošković"

== Traditions ==
=== Patron saint ===
The General Staff's slava or its saint's feast day is Saint George known as Đurđevdan.

== See also ==
- Joint Operations Command
