= Criminal Investigative Group =

- Криминалистичко-истражна група
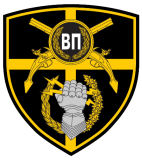
- Active: 2006 – present
- Country: Serbia
- Branch: Serbian General Staff
- Type: Military criminal investigations
- Part of: Serbian Armed Forces
- Garrison/HQ: Belgrade

Commanders
- Current commander: Colonel Dejan Jovanović

The Criminal Investigative Group (Serbian: Криминалистичко-иситражна група, romanized: Kriminalističko-istražna grupa) is organizational unit of the Directorate of Military Police within the General Staff of the Serbian Armed Forces. The personnel of the Group perform tasks of preventing, discovering and resolving criminal acts in the Serbian Armed Forces. It is established on 10 May 2006.

== Missions ==
Through nearly a two decade of existence, the unit has been performing a wide range of tasks in the field of crime suppression. By taking technical and operative measures, the Criminal Investigation Group personnel have discovered and documented many crimes and provided relevant prosecutors with valid information for processing perpetrators. The duties of Criminal Investigative Group (CIG) are,

- to operate under administering powers defined by the Act on the Serbian Armed Forces, Criminal Code of the Republic of Serbia and the Police Act.
- to perform prevention, detection and documentation of criminal acts in accordance with the requests of the responsible prosecutor, and technical and other expert support to the Military Security Agency, as required.
- to cooperate with competent prosecutor offices and courts, and act on their requests in accordance with the prescribed powers.
- to cooperate with the Ministry of Internal Affairs, the Military Security Agency of the Ministry of Defence, commands, units and institutions of the Ministry of Defence and the Serbian Armed Forces and other government organizations and institutions.

== Structure ==
The organizational structure consists of two groups and four centers:

- Operational Affairs Group
- General Affairs Group
- 1st Criminal Investigative Center (Belgrade)
- 2nd Criminal Investigative Center (Belgrade)
- 3rd Criminal Investigative Center (Novi Sad)
- 4th Criminal Investigative Center (Niš)
