= Cobras (Serbia) =

Detachment of the Military Police for Special Operations "Cobras"
- Одред војне полиције специјалне намене „Кобре“
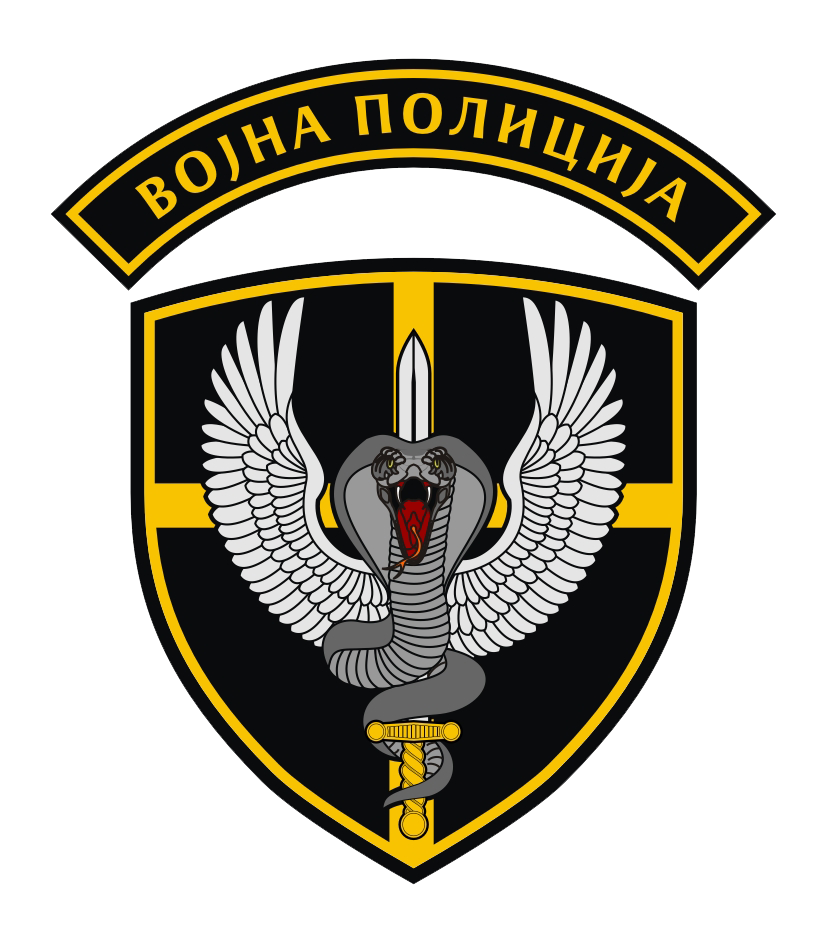
- Active: 1978–present
- Country: Serbia
- Branch: Serbian General Staff
- Type: Military police Special forces
- Role: Close protection Close-quarters combat Special operations
- Part of: Serbian Armed Forces
- Garrison/HQ: Belgrade

Commanders
- Current commander: Vacant

The Detachment of the Military Police for Special Operations "Cobras" (Serbian: Одред војне полиције специјалне намене „Кобре“, romanized: Odred vojne policije specijalne namene „Kobre“) is a military police unit of the Serbian Armed Forces directly subordinated to the General Staff. The unit is responsible for close protection, counter-terrorism and special operations.

== History ==
The unit was first established in Yugoslavia by the order of the Federal Secretary of People's Defence Nikola Ljubičić on 14 April 1978. The unit was included in a special 'Anti-terrorist Department' (Odeljenje Vojne policije za protivteroristička dejstva) within the 282nd battalion of the Yugoslav People's Army. In 1985 the department expanded and transformed into an 'Anti-terrorist platoon' (Vod za protivteroristička dejstva) within the Guard Brigade.

In 1992 it was transferred to the Special Units Corps of newly-formed Armed Forces of Serbia and Montenegro, which included the 63rd Parachute Brigade, 72nd Reconnaissance-Commando Battalion and 1st Guard Brigade. In 2000 the unit was placed under the direct command of the Chief of General Staff. The unit further expanded, with the help of colonel Stojan Kljajić who commanded the unit until 2005. In this period the symbol of a winged cobra twisted around a sword was adopted.

It was organized as an anti-terrorist detachment in 2006 and has been since a component of the Military Police. Since 2013 a number of women have been included in the unit.

== Missions ==
The main responsibilities in recent years include personal and technical protection of the President of the Republic, Minister of Defence, and Chief of the General Staff.

== See also ==
- List of military special forces units
