= Joint Operations Command (Serbia) =

- Здружена оперативна команда
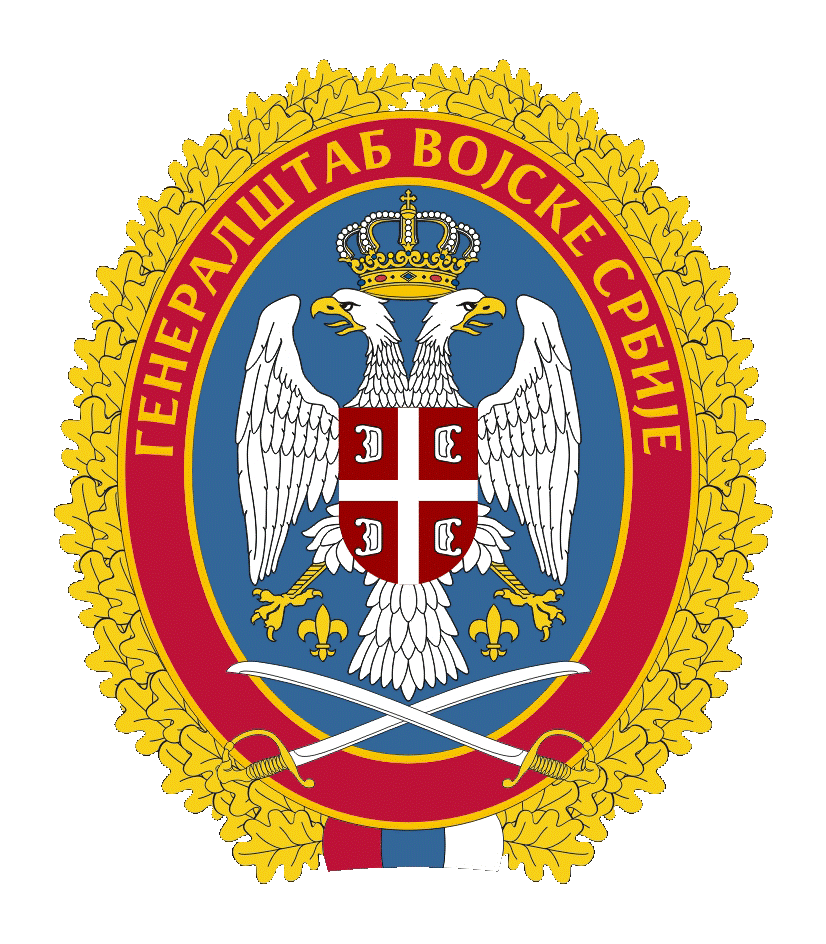
- Active: 2007–present
- Country: Serbia
- Branch: Serbian General Staff
- Type: Operational command
- Part of: Serbian Armed Forces
- Garrison/HQ: Belgrade

Joint Operations Command (Serbian: Здружена оперативна команда, romanized: Združena operativna komanda) is an organizational unit of the Serbian General Staff which conducts operational command of the Serbian Armed Forces.

== Missions ==
Although Joint Operations Command’s main function is to command, it also performs tasks including planning, organizational, control and operational function. The main duties include:

- planning crisis response operations
- commanding forces engaged in operations
- planning the use of forces
- commanding and monitoring the engagement of Serbian Armed Forces units in multinational operations

== Structure ==
The Joint Operations Command has a flexible formation, which is expanded by representatives of other organizational units of the General Staff, and, if there is a need, operational level commands. In peacetime, its commander is also Deputy of the Chief of the General Staff.

The units directly subordinate to the Joint Operations Command are the Peacekeeping Operations Center (PKOC), the Operational Center of the Defence System (OC DS) and the Military Technical Agreement Implementation Commission (MTA IC).

=== Peacekeeping Operations Center ===
The Peacekeeping Operations Center (PKOC) is responsible for training, selecting, equipping, preparing and deploying individuals and units from the Ministry of Defence and the Serbian Armed Forces to multinational operations outside Serbia's borders.

PKOC is a full member of the European Association of Peace Operations Training Centers and the International Association of Peacekeeping Operations Training Centers. It was established on January 1, 2005 as the successor to the National Center for Peacekeeping Missions. It comprises five departments:

- Human Resources Department
- Department for Operations and Staff Affairs
- Training Department
- Support Department
- Finance Group

=== Operational Center of the Defence System ===
The Operational Center of the Defence System (OC DS) monitors activities within the Ministry of Defence and Serbian Armed Forces and force engagement in operations. It was subordinated to the Joint Operations Command in March 2007. Before that, it was within the Directorate of Operations (Ј-3) of the General Staff. It comprises three units:

- Data Monitoring, Recording and Processing Department
- Administration Department
- Section for Traffic and Transit of Foreign Armed Forces

The main duties of OC DS are organization of operational duty, database management, management of operational and functional capability data, regulation of waterways and air space traffic, and recording and providing statistical analysis of emergency situations.

=== Military Technical Agreement Implementation Commission ===
The Military Technical Agreement Implementation Commission (MTA IC) controls the implementation of MTA regulations, cooperates with the NATO-led Kosovo Force (KFOR) and maintains communication between Serbian security forces and KFOR. Based on Article IV of the 1999 Military Technical Agreement between the then Yugoslav Armed Forces and NATO, a Joint Implementation Commission for the implementation of the MTA was established, composed of KFOR representatives and representatives of the Serbian Armed Forces and Ministry of Internal Affairs. This agreement, and Resolution 1244 of the UN Security Council, led to the discontinuation of NATO air strikes against the FR Yugoslavia. NATO was authorized to establish multinational forces for conducting peace operations in Kosovo and Metohija. These multinational units became KFOR, with headquarters in Priština.
