= Central Logistics Base =

- Централна логистичка база
- Active: 1992 – present
- Country: Serbia
- Branch: Serbian General Staff
- Type: Logistics
- Size: Brigade
- Part of: Serbian Armed Forces
- Garrison/HQ: Belgrade
- Anniversaries: 16 November

Commanders
- Current commander: Brigade General Goran Zeković

The Central Logistics Base (Serbian: Централна логистичка база, Centralna logistička baza) is the main central logistics unit of the Serbian Armed Forces. It is under the direct command of the General Staff.

== History ==
In Yugoslavia, the Procurement Base for the Imported Materiel of Yugoslav People's Army was established in 1953. The base was transformed in 1961. In 1987, the Technical-Supply Base of Yugoslav Ministry of Defence was formed. In the Federal Republic of Yugoslavia, the 608th Rear Base was formed on November 16, 1992, under direct command of the General Staff.

The Central Logistics Base was formed on 15 December 2006 with the reorganization of 608th Rear Base and subordinating storage facilities of 793rd Rear Base as well as 524th and 201st Logistics base.

== Tasks ==
The main task of Central Logistics Base is providing units and institutions of Serbian Armed Forces with basic moveable materiel and reserve parts, ordnance and fuels, quartermaster, medical and vet moveable supplies. It is also in charge of maintenance of special-purpose resources, ordnance and missiles, fuels and wiring.

== Structure ==
Central Logistics Base comprises a total of 21 warehouses and 9 sections in 49 locations. It consists of command company and 4 battalions (including battalion-size 1st Logistics Center):

- Command company
- 1st Logistics Center - Belgrade (Kneževac)
- 1st Depot Battalion - Gornji Milanovac (Lunjevica)
- 2nd Depot Battalion - Kragujevac
- 3rd Depot Battalion - Niš
- 2nd Retail Center - Niš
