= Peacekeeping Operations Center =

Unit within Serbian Armed Forces

- Центар за мировне операције
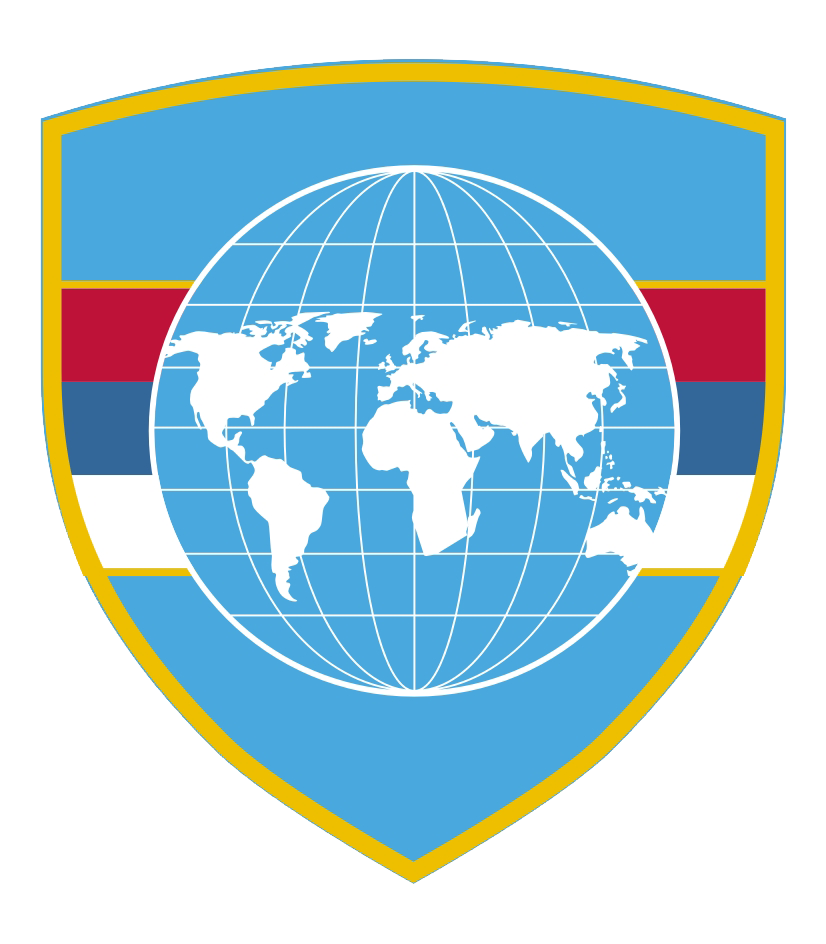
- Active: 2005–present
- Country: Serbia
- Branch: Serbian General Staff
- Type: Peacekeeping operations
- Part of: Serbian Armed Forces
- Garrison/HQ: Belgrade

Commanders
- Current commander: Colonel Milivoje Pajović

Peacekeeping Operations Center (Serbian: Центар за мировне операције, romanized: Centar za mirovne operacije) is a unit of the Joint Operations Command within the Serbian General Staff. It is the major authority for training, selection, equipping, preparation and deployment of individuals and units from the Ministry of Defense and Serbian Armed Forces to multinational operations outside the borders of Serbia.

== History ==
Following the end of the Yugoslav Wars, the Armed Forces of Serbia and Montenegro joined multinational peace operations in 2002. They participated in UNMISET in East Timor and ONUB in Burundi. In these multinational operations, the officers were individually deployed as military observers. Since 2002 peacekeeping missions in the military were coordinated by the Section for International Integration and Peace Operations from the Operational Department of the General Staff of the Armed Forces of Serbia and Montenegro. In 2003, this section became the National Center for Peacekeeping Missions, subordinated to the Deputy Chief of General Staff of the Armed Forces of Serbia and Montenegro.

The Peacekeeping Operations Center, as the legal successor of the National Center for Peacekeeping Missions, was established on January 1, 2005. Thereafter, it was subordinated to the Joint Operations Command of the General Staff. The Peacekeeping Operations Center celebrates its day on November 17 in memory of the day when, in 1956, the precursor of the JNA Detachment was sent to the UN Emergency Force (UNEF) in Sinai.

== Tasks ==
Deploying individual officers requires the existence of an organizational unit to coordinate activities in selecting staff, logistics, preparing for specific duties and resolving their status. The center has various duties:

- Selection, training and preparation of personnel and participation in training and preparation
- Monitoring, coordination and control
- Planning, organization, and transport of individuals, units, weapons and equipment
- Planning, organization and execution of national and international courses, seminars and lectures
- Development of criteria for manning units and key staff
- Proposing individuals for training in the country and abroad
- Participate in the selection and development of unit training
- Coordination of the preparation of forces with the organizational units of the Ministry of Defense and the Serbian Armed Forces General Staff and the relevant entities in the Republic of Serbia and other international entities and organizations.
- Proposing the costs of preparing and deploying individuals and units to participate
- Participate in the assessment of the capabilities of the units for deployment
- Preparation of the Memorandum of Understanding and technical agreements for the deployment of members of the Serbian Armed Forces
- Drafting and amending the normative and legal framework
- Cooperation with peace-support operations, training centers and international organizations
- Cooperation with the Ministry of Defence and the General Staff in charge of international military cooperation and training.
- Cooperation with international entities for the exchange of ideas and experiences from multinational operations

== Structure ==
The center consists of four departments and one group:

- Human Resources Department
- Operations and Staff Affairs Department
- Training Department
- Support Department
- Finance Group
