= Signal Brigade (Serbia) =

- Бригада везе
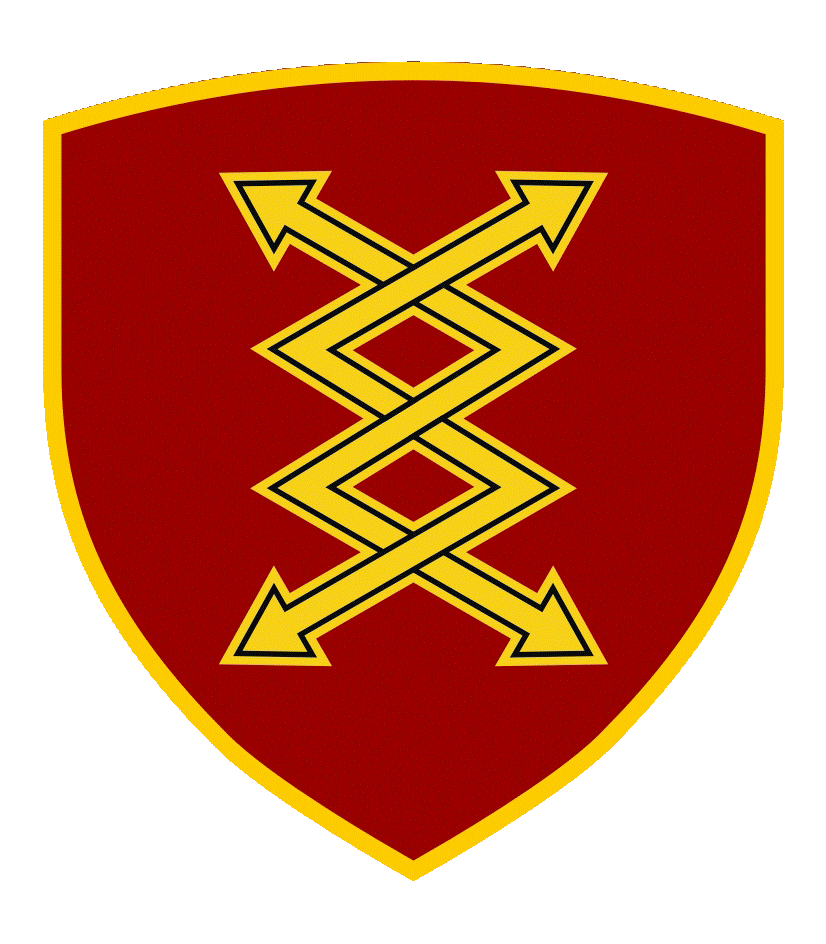
- Active: 2006 – present
- Country: Serbia
- Branch: Serbian General Staff
- Type: Signal
- Part of: Serbian Armed Forces
- Garrison/HQ: Belgrade
- Anniversaries: 20 September

Commanders
- Current commander: Colonel Zoran Dragićević

The Serbian Signal Brigade (Serbian: Бригада везе, romanized: Brigada veze) is a main unit of Serbian Armed Forces responsible for the military communications (signals). It is under direct command of General Staff.

== History ==
The brigade was formed on 30 October 2006 by merging the former 389th Signal Brigade and 235th Stationary Signal Unit.

== Tasks ==
The main task of the brigade is establishing and maintaining the stationary signal systems on the whole territory of the country. It provides joint command over the signalling system of Serbia.

== Structure ==
Signal Brigade consists of command platoon and 4 battalions which are based in garrisons and detached establishments all over the country.

- Command platoon
- 1st Signal Battalion
- 2nd Signal Battalion
- 3rd Signal Battalion
- 4th Signal Battalion
