= Joint Operations Command =

Joint Operations Command may refer to:

- Canadian Joint Operations Command
- Joint Operations Command (Australia)
- Joint Operations Command (Italy)
- Joint Operations Command (Japan)
- Joint Operations Command (Serbia)
- Joint Operations Command (Sri Lanka)
- Joint Operations Command (Zimbabwe)

== See also ==
- Joint Forces Command (UK)
- Joint Special Operations Command (US)
- United States Joint Forces Command
- Joint Special Operations Command (Jordan)
- Permanent Joint Headquarters (UK)
