= Serbian Armed Forces =

Combined military forces of Serbia

- Bojcка Србије
- Emblem of the Serbian Armed Forces
- Founded: 6 May 1830; 196 years ago
- Current form: 8 June 2006
- Service branches: Serbian Army; Serbian Air Force and Air Defence
- Headquarters: Belgrade, Serbia
- Website: vs.rs

Leadership
- Commander-in-chief: President Aleksandar Čupić (acting)
- Minister of Defence: Bratislav Gašić
- Chief of the General Staff: Lt. Col. General Tiosav Janković (acting)

Personnel
- Military age: 18 years of age
- Conscription: No
- Active personnel: 22,500
- Reserve personnel: 2,000 (active reserve); 600,000 (passive reserve)
- Deployed personnel: 336

Expenditure
- Budget: $3.1 billion (2026)
- Percent of GDP: 2.7% (2026)

Industry
- Domestic suppliers: Yugoimport–SDPR (armored vehicles and artillery systems); Zastava Arms (firearms); Sloboda (large-caliber ammunition); Krušik (large-caliber ammunition); Prvi Partizan (small-caliber ammunition); Milan Blagojević (gunpowder); Utva (trainer aircraft and drones); FAP (light utility vehicles); Zastava Tervo (light utility vehicles); Yumco (combat uniforms, helmets, and ballistic vests)
- Foreign suppliers: France; China; Israel; Russia; Germany
- Annual exports: $1.6 billion (2023)

Related articles
- History: History of the Serbian Army; History of the Serbian Air Force
- Ranks: Military ranks of Serbia

The Serbian Armed Forces (Serbian: Војска Србије, romanized: Vojska Srbije) is the military of Serbia.

The President of the Republic acts as commander-in-chief of the armed forces, while administration and defence policy is carried out by the Government through the Ministry of Defence. The highest operational authority, in charge of the deployment and preparation of the armed forces in peace and war, is the General Staff. Military service is voluntary, though conscription may occur in wartime.

The Serbian Armed Forces consists of two branches: the Serbian Army and the Serbian Air Force and Air Defence.

== History ==
Serbia has a long military tradition dating to early medieval period. The modern Serbian military dates back to the Serbian Revolution which started in 1804 with the First Serbian Uprising against the Ottoman occupation of Serbia. The victories in the battles of Ivankovac (1805), Mišar (August 1806), Deligrad (December 1806) and Belgrade (November–December 1806), led to the establishment of the Principality of Serbia in 1817. The subsequent Second Serbian Uprising of 1815–1817 led to full independence and recognition of the Kingdom of Serbia and weakened the Ottoman dominance in the Balkans. In November 1885 the Serbo-Bulgarian War occurred following Bulgarian unification and resulted in a Bulgarian victory. In 1912 the First Balkan War (1912–1913) erupted between the Ottoman Empire and the Balkan League (Serbia, Greece, Montenegro and Bulgaria). Balkan League victories in the Battle of Kumanovo (October 1912), the Battle of Prilep (November 1912), the Battle of Monastir (November 1912), the Battle of Adrianople (November 1912 to March 1913), and the Siege of Scutari (October 1912 to April 1913) resulted in the defeat of the Ottoman Empire, which lost most of its remaining Balkan territories per the Treaty of London (May 1913). Shortly after, the Second Balkan War (June to August, 1913) broke out when Bulgaria, dissatisfied with the division of territory, declared war against its former allies, Serbia and Greece. Following a string of defeats, Bulgaria requested an armistice and signed the 1913 Treaty of Bucharest, formally ending the war.

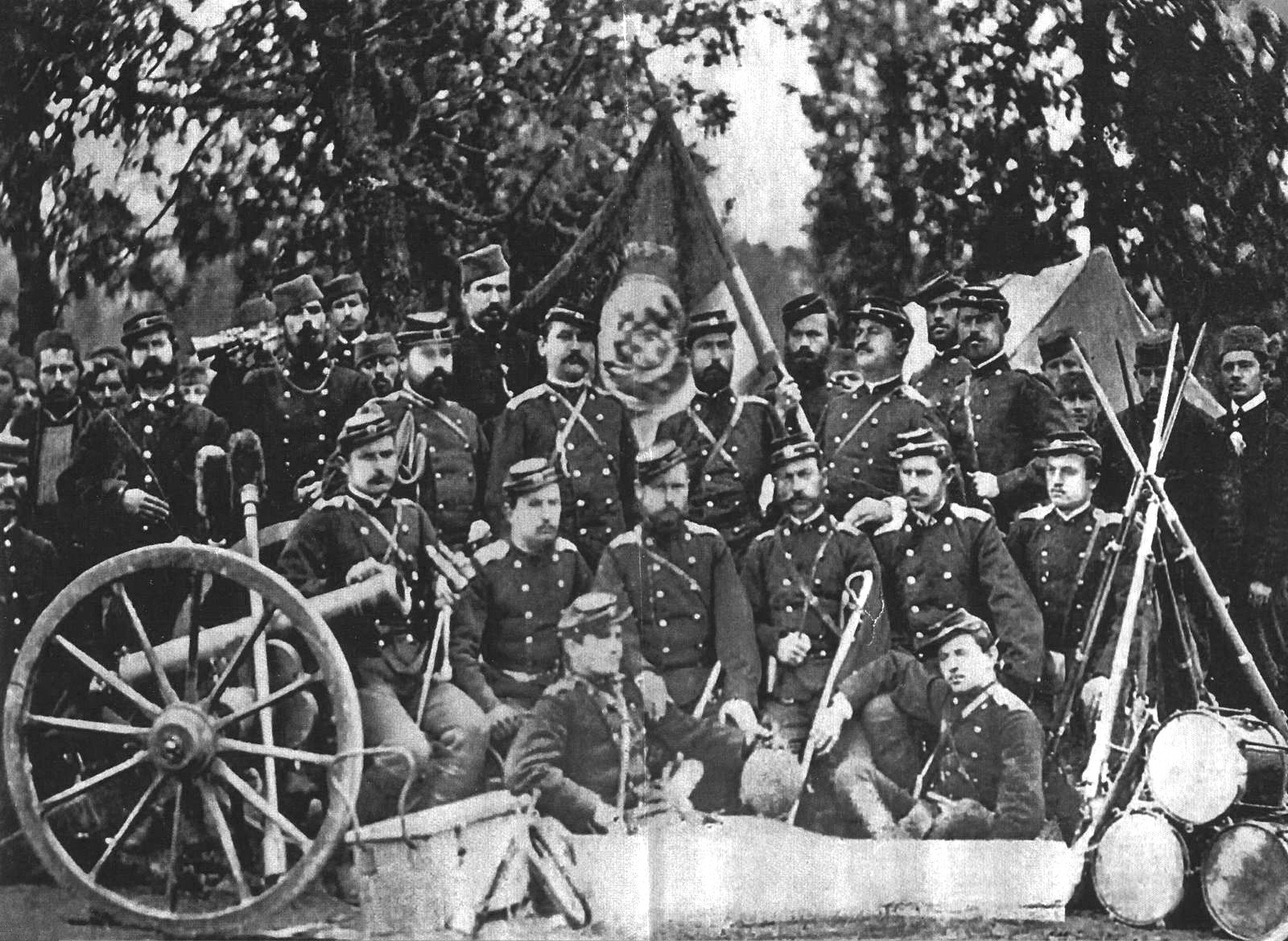
Camp of the Armed Forces of the Principality of Serbia during Serbian–Ottoman Wars, 1876

Serbia's independence and growing influence threatened neighboring Austria-Hungary which led to the Bosnian crisis of 1908–09. Consequently, from 1901, all Serbian males between the ages of 21 and 46 became liable for general mobilization. Following the assassination of Archduke Franz Ferdinand of Austria in June 1914, Austria-Hungary implicated Serbians and declared war on Serbia (July 1914), which marked the beginning of the First World War of 1914–1918. Serbian forces repelled three consecutive invasions by Austria in 1914, securing the first major victories of the war for the Allies, but were eventually overwhelmed by the combined forces of the Central Powers (October–November 1915) and forced to retreat through Albania (1915–1916) to the Greek island of Corfu (1915–1916).

Serbian military activity after World War I took place in the context of various Yugoslav armies until the breakup of Yugoslavia in the 1990s and the restoration of Serbia as an independent state in 2006.

== Organization ==
The Serbian Armed Forces are commanded by the General Staff corp of senior officers. The general staff is led by the Chief of the General Staff. The President of the Republic who is the Commander-in-Chief appoints the Chief of the General Staff on the suggestion of the Minister of Defence. The current Chief of the General Staff is General Milan Mojsilović.

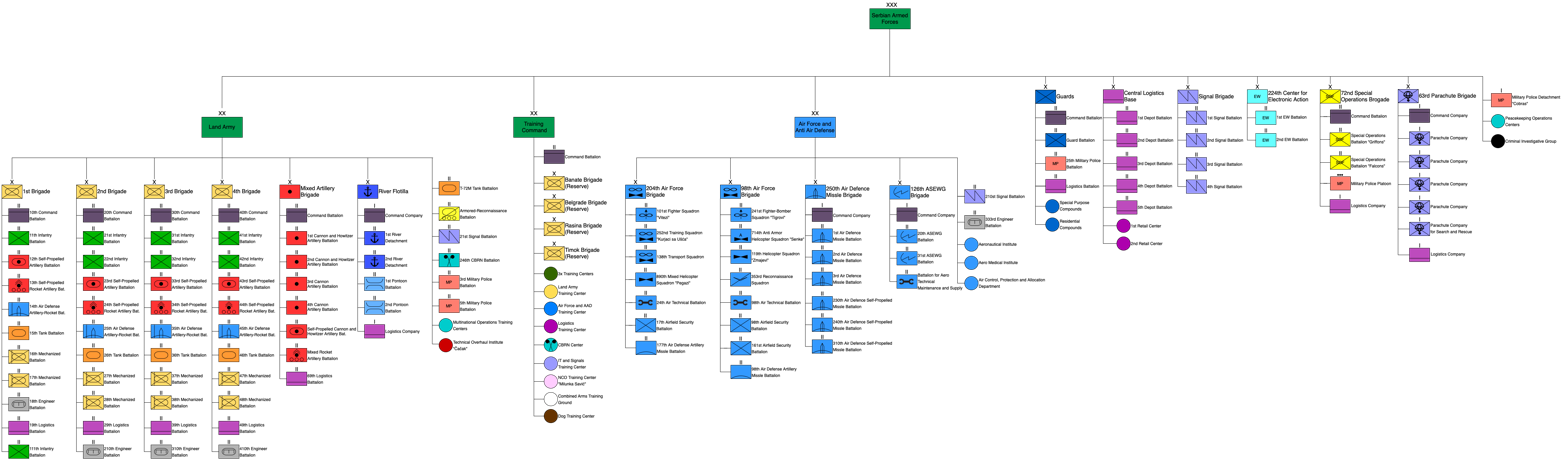
Organization of the Serbian Armed Forces

=== Service branches ===
The armed forces consist of the following service branches:

- Serbian Army
- Serbian Air Force and Air Defence

==== Serbian Army ====
The Serbian Army (Kopnena vojska Srbije - KoV) is the land-based and the largest component of the armed forces consisting of: infantry, armoured, artillery, engineering units as well as River Flotilla. It is responsible for defending the sovereignty and territorial integrity of Serbia; participating in peacekeeping operations; and providing humanitarian aid and disaster relief.

==== Serbian Air Force and Air Defence ====
The Serbian Air Force and Air Defence (Ratno vazduhoplovstvo i protivvazduhoplovna odbrana Vojske Srbije - RViPVO) is the aviation and anti-aircraft defence based component of the armed forces consisting of: aviation, anti-aircraft, surveillance and reconnaissance units. Its mission is to guard and protect the sovereignty of Serbian airspace, and jointly with the Army, to protect territorial integrity.

=== Command structure ===
Command structure of the Serbian Armed Forces is centered around General Staff as the highest command authority, and three separate commands: one for each of the branches (Army Command and Air Force and Air Defence Command) and one responsible for training (Training Command).

==== General Staff ====
The Serbian General Staff (Generalštab Vojske Srbije) makes strategic and tactical preparations and procedures for use during peacetime and war. Special forces (63rd Parachute Brigade and 72nd Brigade for Special Operations) are under direct command of the Chief of the General Staff. Organizational units of the Armed Forces subordinated to the General Staff are: Guard, Signal Brigade, Central Logistics Base, 224th Center for Electronic Action, Technical Testing Center, Peacekeeping Operations Center, as well as the Directorate of Military Police (which includes Criminal Investigative Group and Detachment of the Military Police for Special Operations "Cobras").

==== Army Command ====
Army Command (Komanda Kopnene vojske) is responsible for unitary, administrative and operational control of the Army. Army Command headquarters is in Niš.

==== Air Force and Air Defence Command ====
Air Force and Air Defence Command (Komanda Ratnog vazduhoplovstva i protivvazduhoplovne odbrane) is responsible for unitary, administrative and operational control of the Air Force and Air Defence. Its headquarters is in Zemun.

==== Training Command ====
The Training Command (Komanda za obuku) is responsible for providing basic and specialist training for soldiers, non-commissioned officers and officers of Serbian Armed Forces as well the members of foreign armies. It also serves the role of maintaining the reserve regional brigade structure of the Serbian Armed Forces.

== Personnel ==
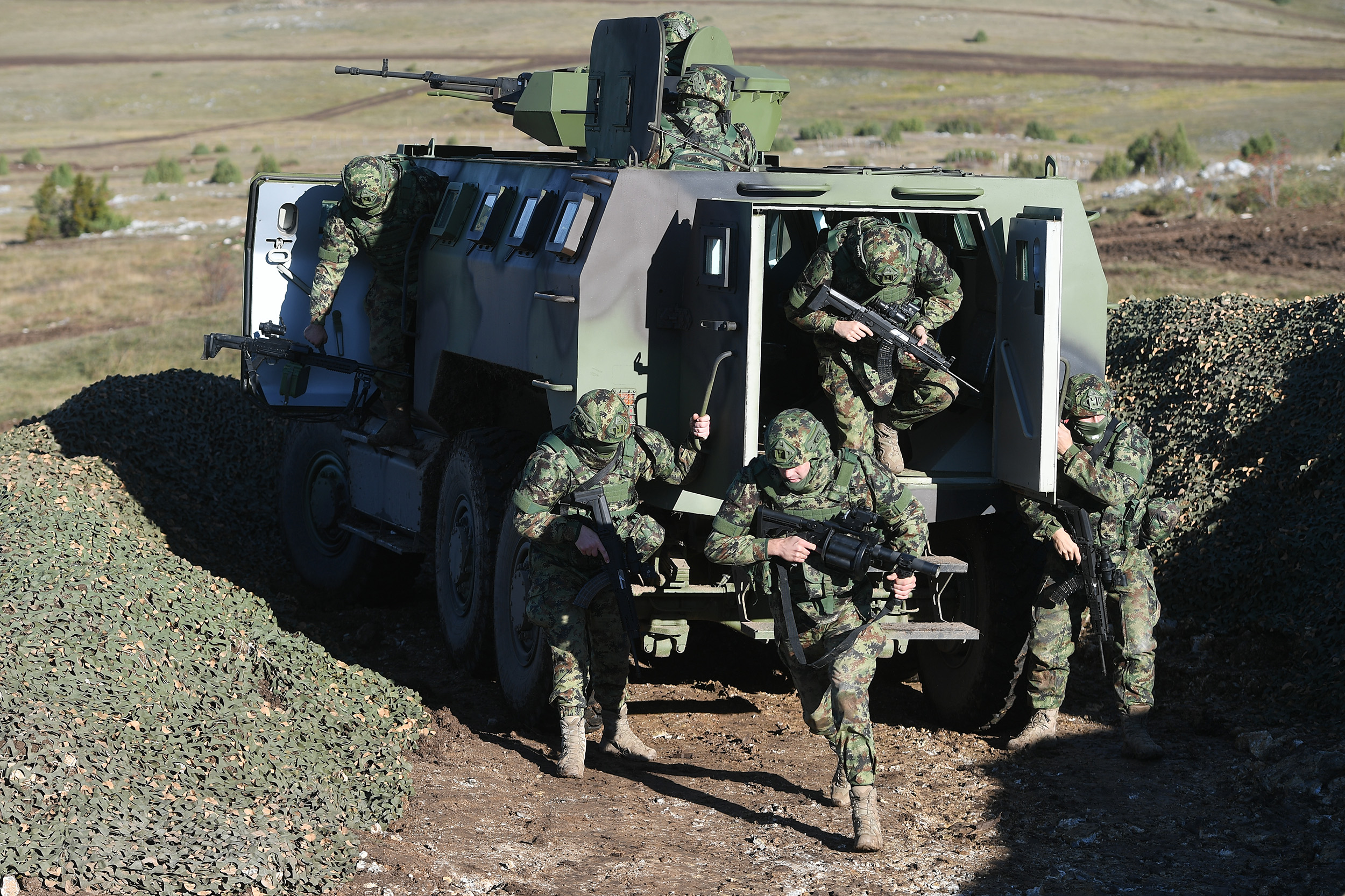
Serbian Army infantrymen during 2020 Sadejstvo exercise

The Serbian Armed Forces are composed entirely of professionals and volunteers following the suspension of mandatory military service in 2011.

=== Active personnel ===
There are 22,500 active members: 4,200 officers, 6,500 non-commissioned officers, 8,200 active-duty soldiers and 3,500 civilians in volunteer military service. It breaks down as follows:

- General Staff (including attached units: special forces brigades, Guard, Signal Brigade, logistics, etc.): 4,300
- Army Command: 13,200
- Air Force and Air Defence Command: 3,000
- Training Command: 2,300

=== Reserve force ===
The reserve force is composed of an active reserve and passive (i.e. war-time) reserve. The active reserve forces have 2,000 members and they are generally required to perform 45 days of military service per year. They are assigned to one of four reserve territorial brigades (Banat Brigade, Belgrade Brigade, Timok Brigade, and Rasina Brigade), each having active HQ, command company and logistics company predicted for rapid deployment in case of war. The passive reserve totals about 600,000 citizens with past military training or experience and is activated only in the events of war.

== Equipment ==
The Serbian Armed Forces has a wide variety of equipment, mix of new equipment, either domestically-produced from Serbian defence contractors or acquired from foreign producers (main suppliers being France, China, Israel, Russia, and to a lesser extent Germany) and older Yugoslav and Soviet products (dating back to the 1980s, modernized or being in the process of modernization).

The inventory of the Serbian Army includes: 242 tanks (30 Russian-made T-72 B1MS and 212 Yugoslav-made M-84), 96 self-propelled howitzers (24 domestically-produced Nora B-52 and 72 Soviet-made Gvozdika), Israeli-made PULS multiple rocket launcher systems (armed with Predator Hawk tactical ballistic missiles and EXTRA artillery rockets) and 60 Yugoslav-made M-77 Oganj multiple rocket launcher systems, 320 Yugoslav-made BVP M-80 infantry fighting vehicles, 80 domestically-produced Lazar armoured personnel carriers, 108 Russian BTR-80 amphibious armoured personnel carriers, some 130 domestically-produced MRAPs (M20 and Miloš) as well as around 30 pieces of domestically-produced PASARS-16 short-range air-defence missile system (armed with French Mistral 3 missiles).

The Serbian Air Force and Air Defense has in operational use the following equipment: 13 Soviet-made MiG-29 fighter aircraft (10 of which are modernized to SM standard and armed with R-77 missiles), 13 Yugoslav-made J-22 attack aircraft, 2 Spanish C-295 transport aircraft, 15 Russian Mi-35 attack helicopter (armed with Ataka missiles), 15 German H145M utility helicopters (of which ten are armed with HForce weapon system), 5 Russian Mi-17 utility helicopters, Israeli Hermes 900 and Chinese CH-95 and CH-92 combat drones, Chinese HQ-22 and HQ-17 medium- and short-range air-defence missile systems (4 and 2 batteries respectively), as well as one battery of Russian Pantsir short-range air-defence missile system (2 more on order but delivery postponed due to sanctions on Russia).

Over the last several years, Serbia has embarked on an ambitious program of equipment modernization and acquisition. Whenever possible, the Serbian Ministry of Defence favors products that are manufactured in Serbia, such as: Lazar 3M infantry fighting vehicles, Lazar 3 armoured personnel carriers, M20 and Miloš MRAPs, Nora B-52 self-propelled howitzers, ALAS guided missiles, Lasta 95 training aircraft, Pegaz combat drones, Gavran 145 and Osica loitering munitions, Vrabac reconnaissance drones, and Zastava M19 assault rifles. Largest procurement of foreign equipment included: Chinese HQ-22 and HQ-17 air-defence missile systems; Israeli PULS multiple rocket launcher systems; Airbus H145M utility helicopters; Russian Mi-35 attack helicopters; as well as various missile and radar acquisitions (Israeli Predator Hawk tactical ballistic missiles and EXTRA artillery rockets for PULS multiple rocket launcher systems; French surface-to-air Mistral missiles for PASARS-16 short-range air-defence missile system; Russian R-77 air-to-air missiles for MiG-29 fighter aircraft, Ataka air-to-surface missiles for Mi-35 attack helicopters, and Kornet man-portable anti-tank guided missiles; as well as French Ground Master 400α and Ground Master 200 long- and medium-range radar systems), and drones (Israeli Hermes 900 and Chinese CH-95 and CH-92 combat drones; Israeli SkyStriker and Lanius-X loitering munition as well as gamma of Emirati loitering munition - Shadow 25, Shadow 50, and SM2). Also, various Russian electronic warfare systems were acquired: Krasukha, Moskva-1, and Repellent-1.

Significant acquisitions of military equipment are also planned in the near future. Purchase of 12 new French Rafale multirole fighter aircraft was announced in 2024 with the aim of replacing MiG-29 which will be in service until the end of the 2020s. In 2025, a $1.6 billion contract was signed with Israeli defence company, Elbit Systems, focusing on advanced command and control systems (including intelligence solutions that encompass all operational levels, from strategic to tactical), electro-optical devices, and night vision. Purchase of Chinese HQ-9 long-range air-defence and anti-ballistic missile systems was announced in 2026.

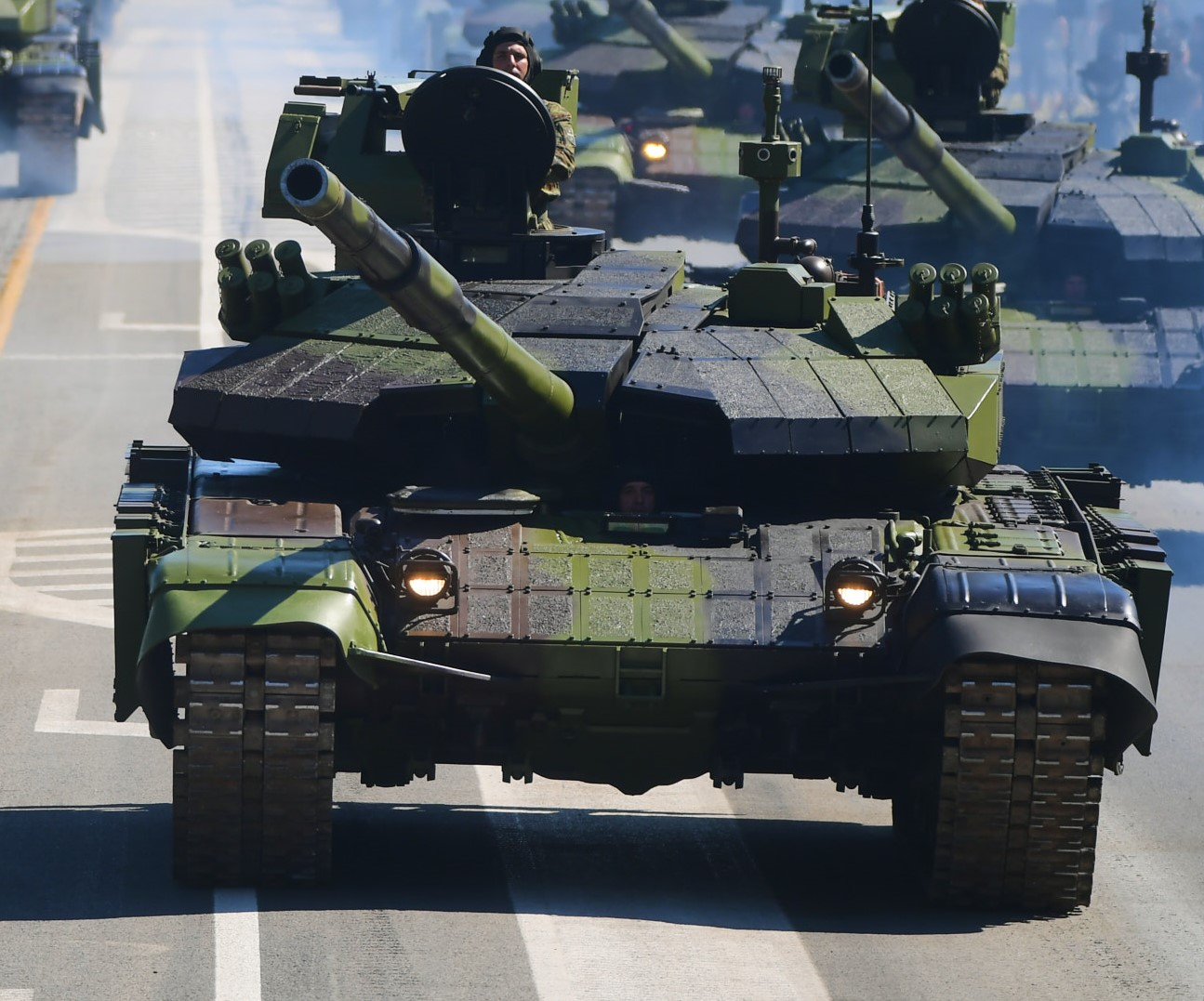
M84AS2 tank

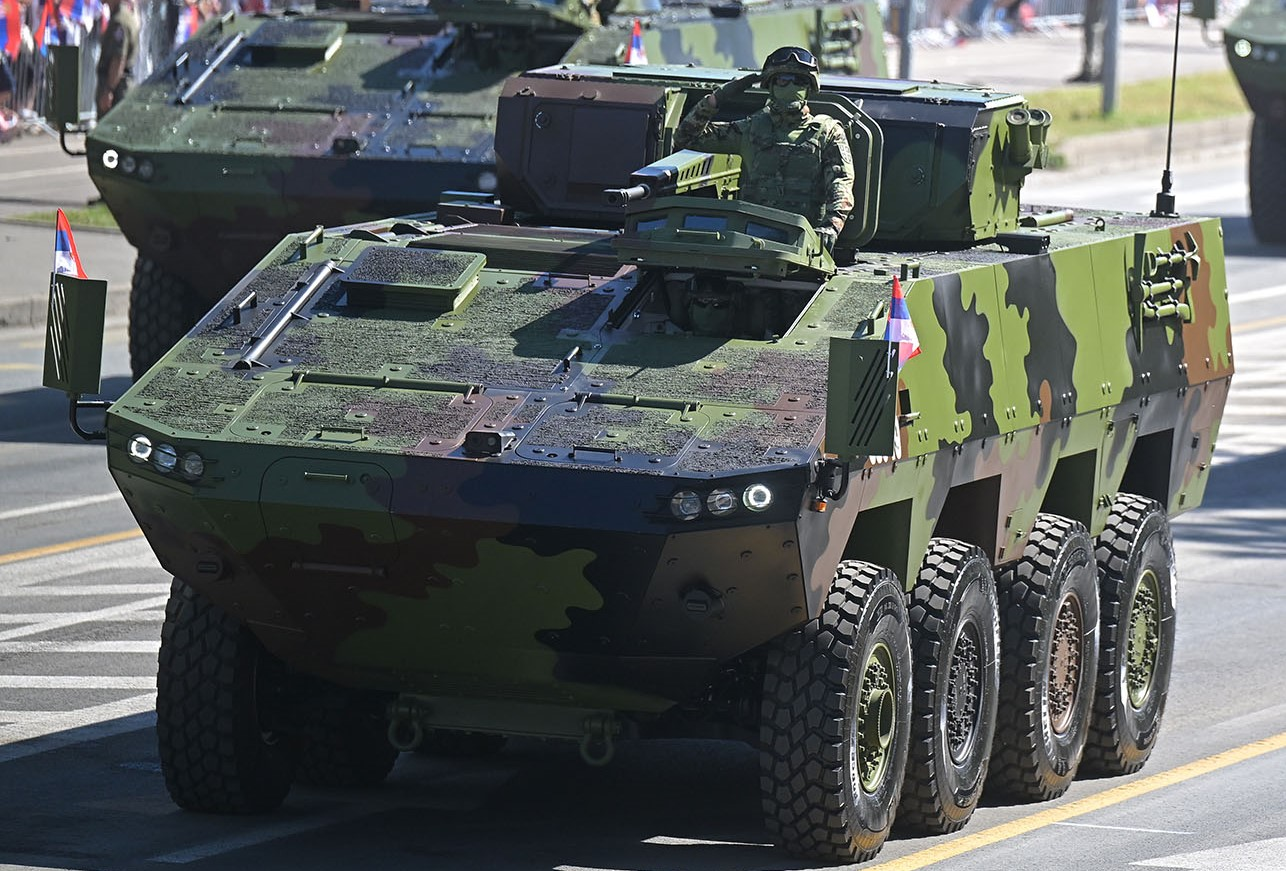
Lazar 3M infantry fighting vehicle

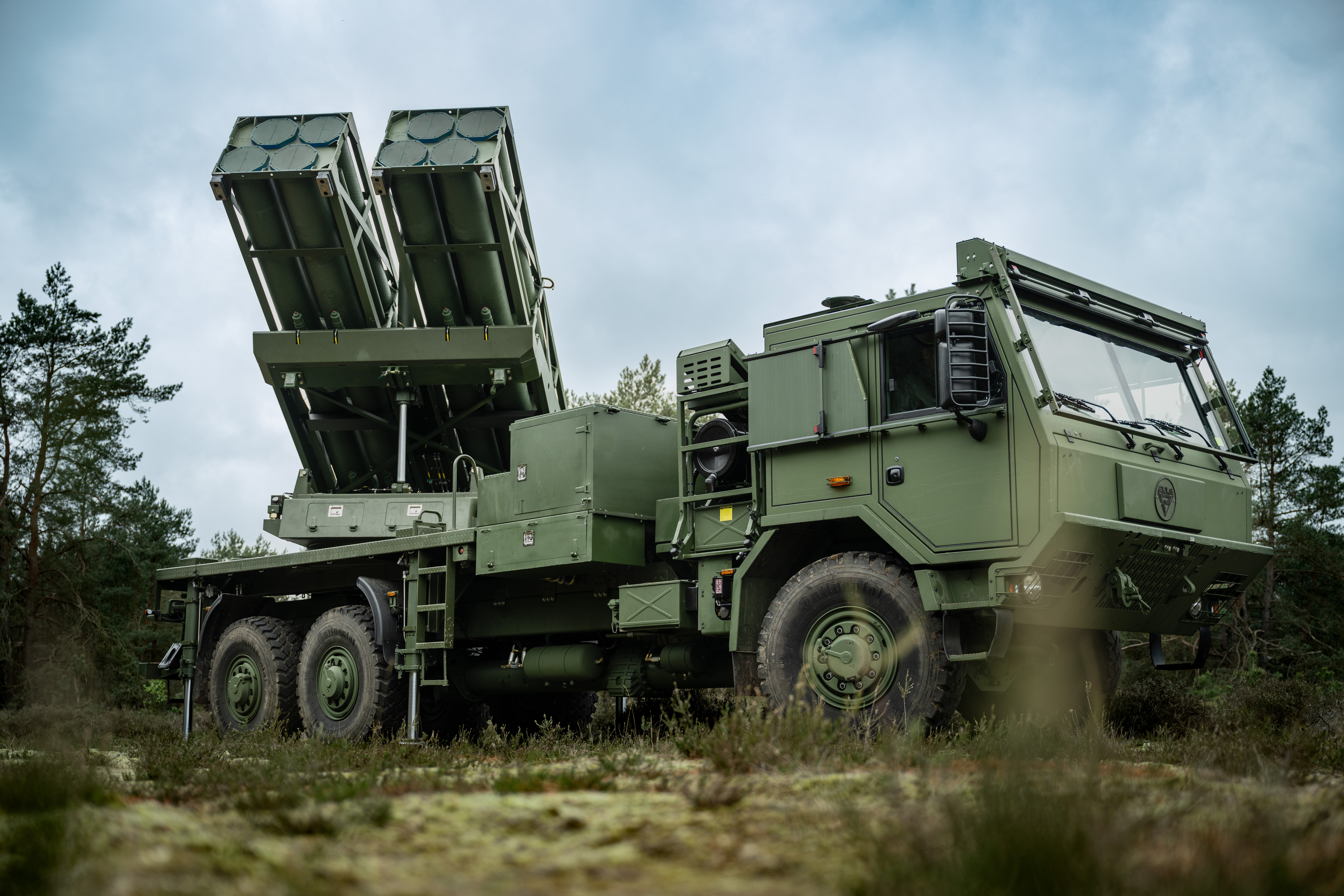
PULS multiple rocket launcher

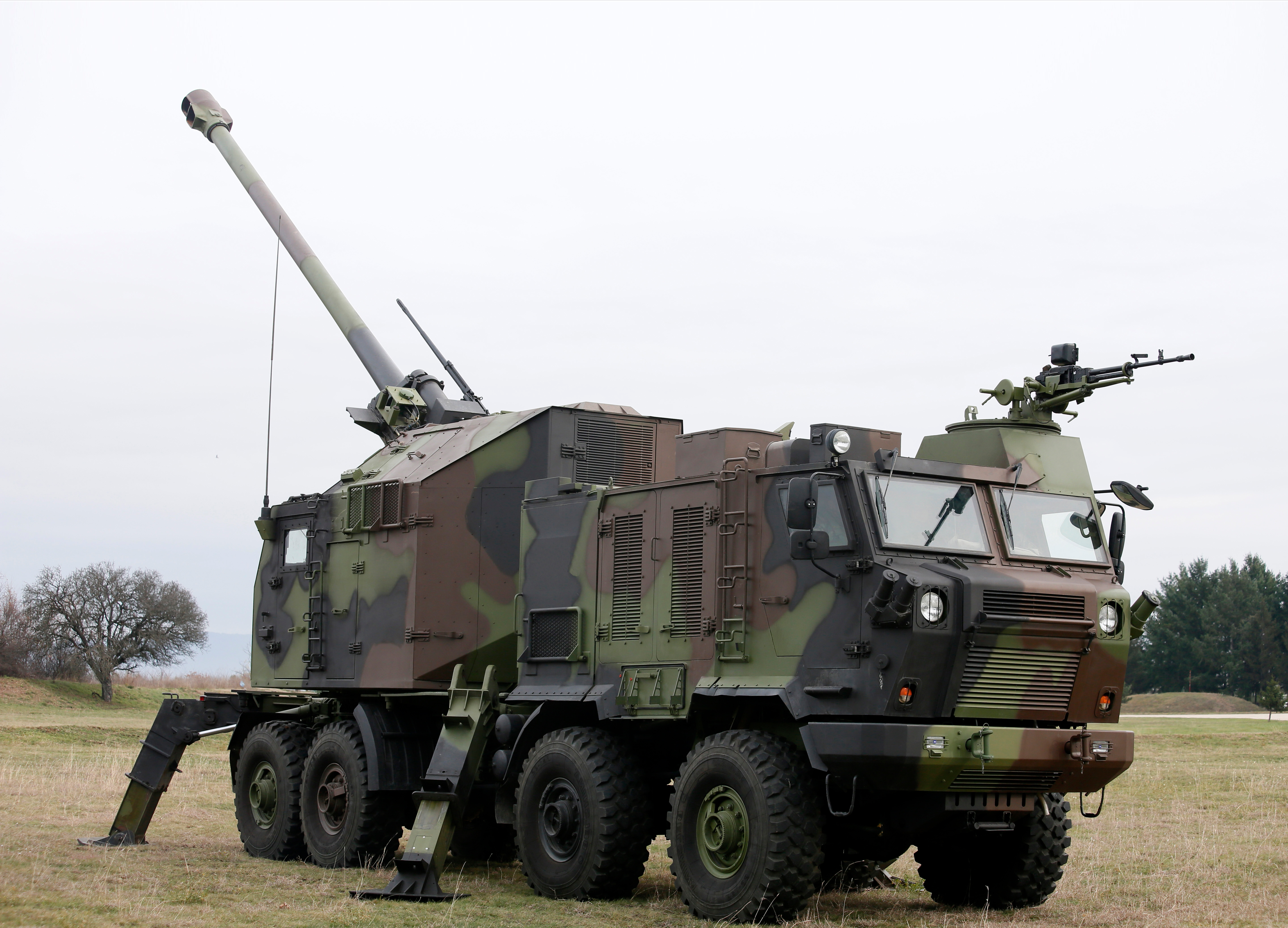
Nora B-52 self-propelled howitzer

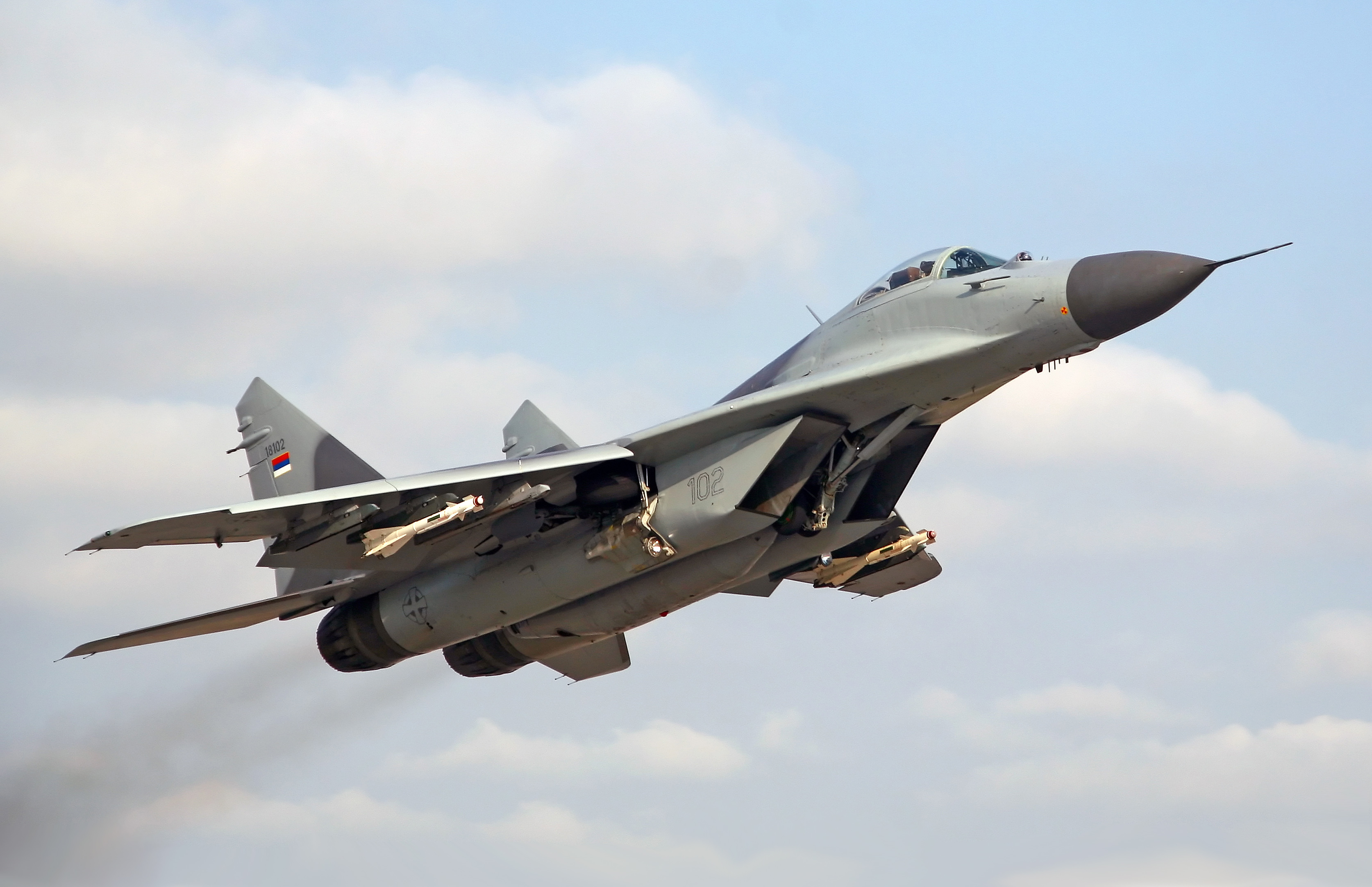
MiG-29 fighter aircraft

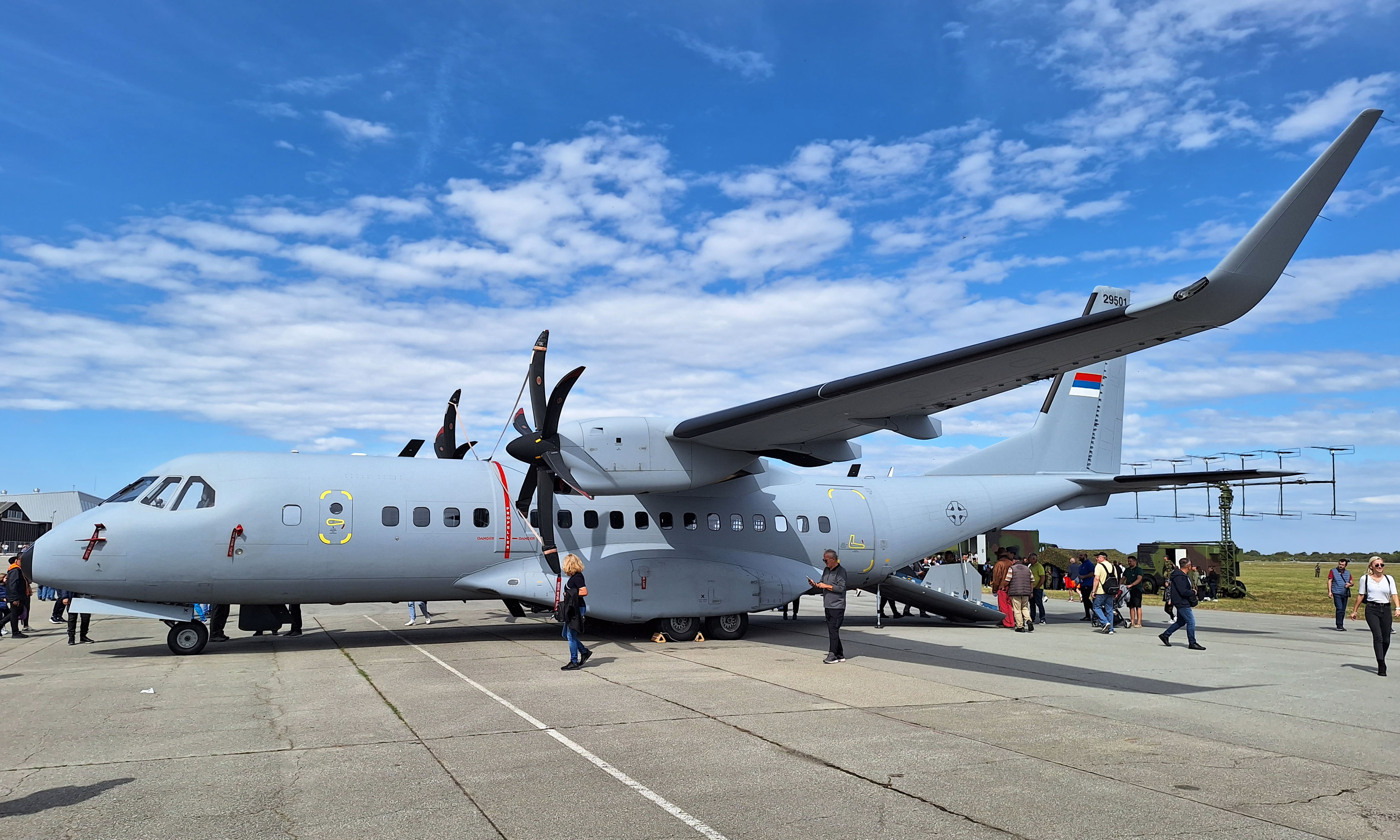
C-295 transport aircraft

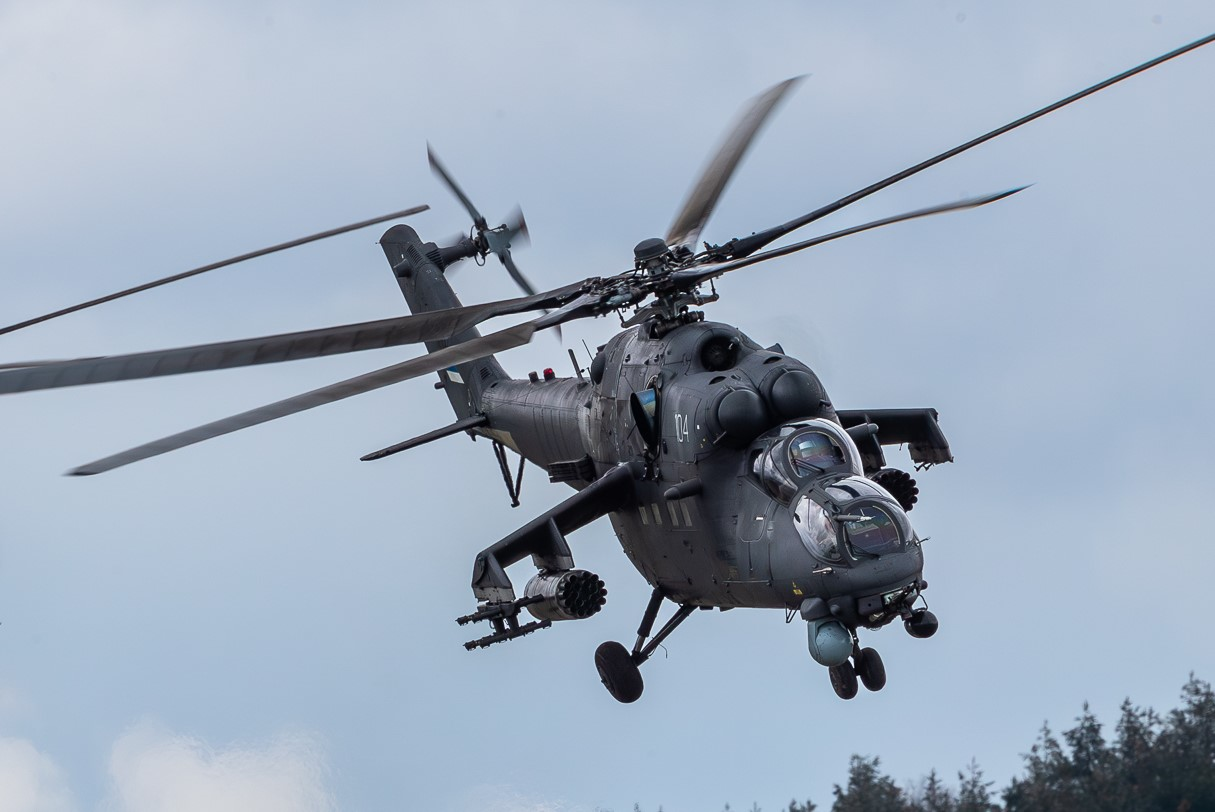
Mi-35 attack helicopter

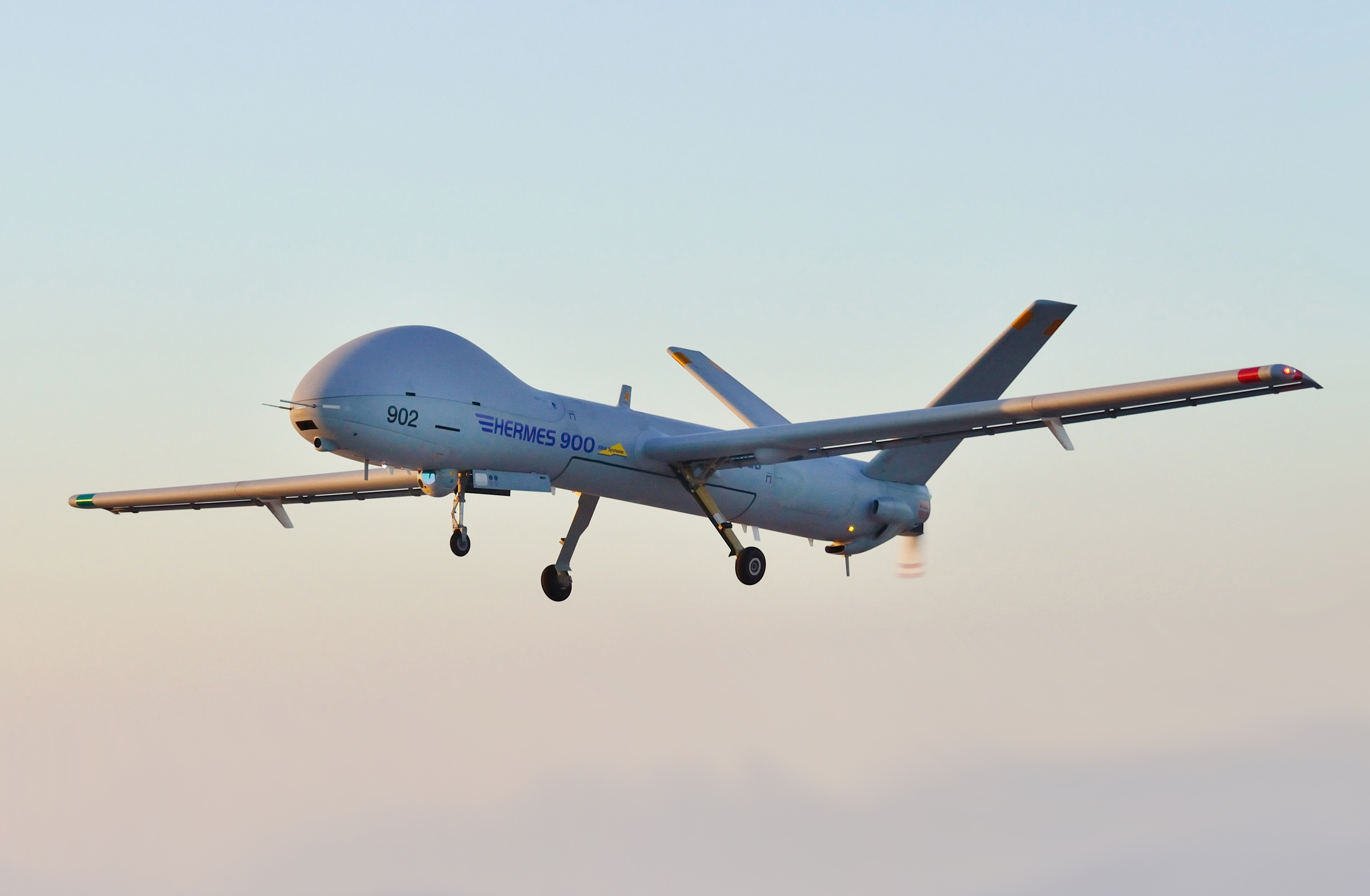
Hermes 900 combat drone

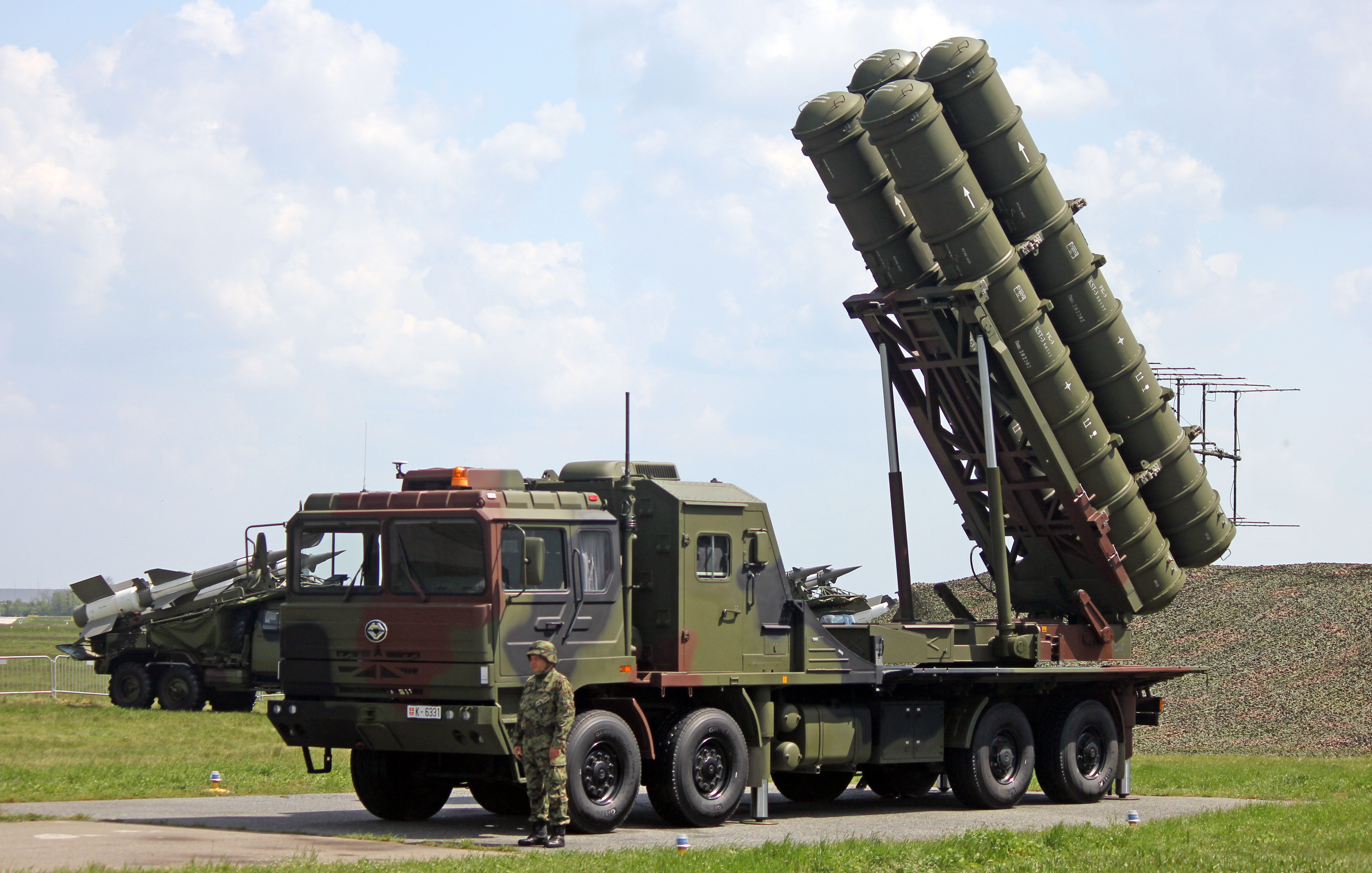
HQ-22 medium-range air-defence missile system

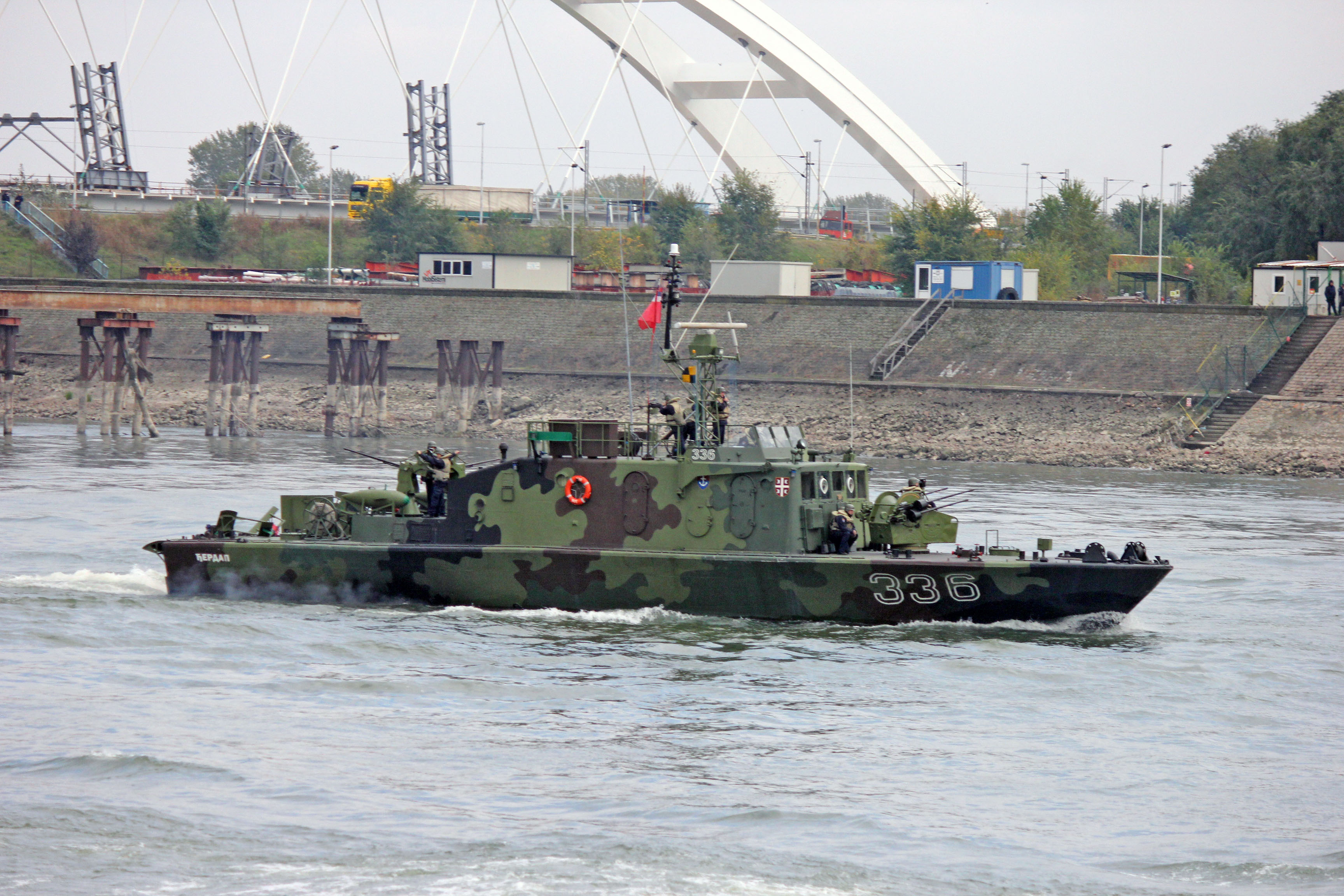
Neštin-class river minesweeper

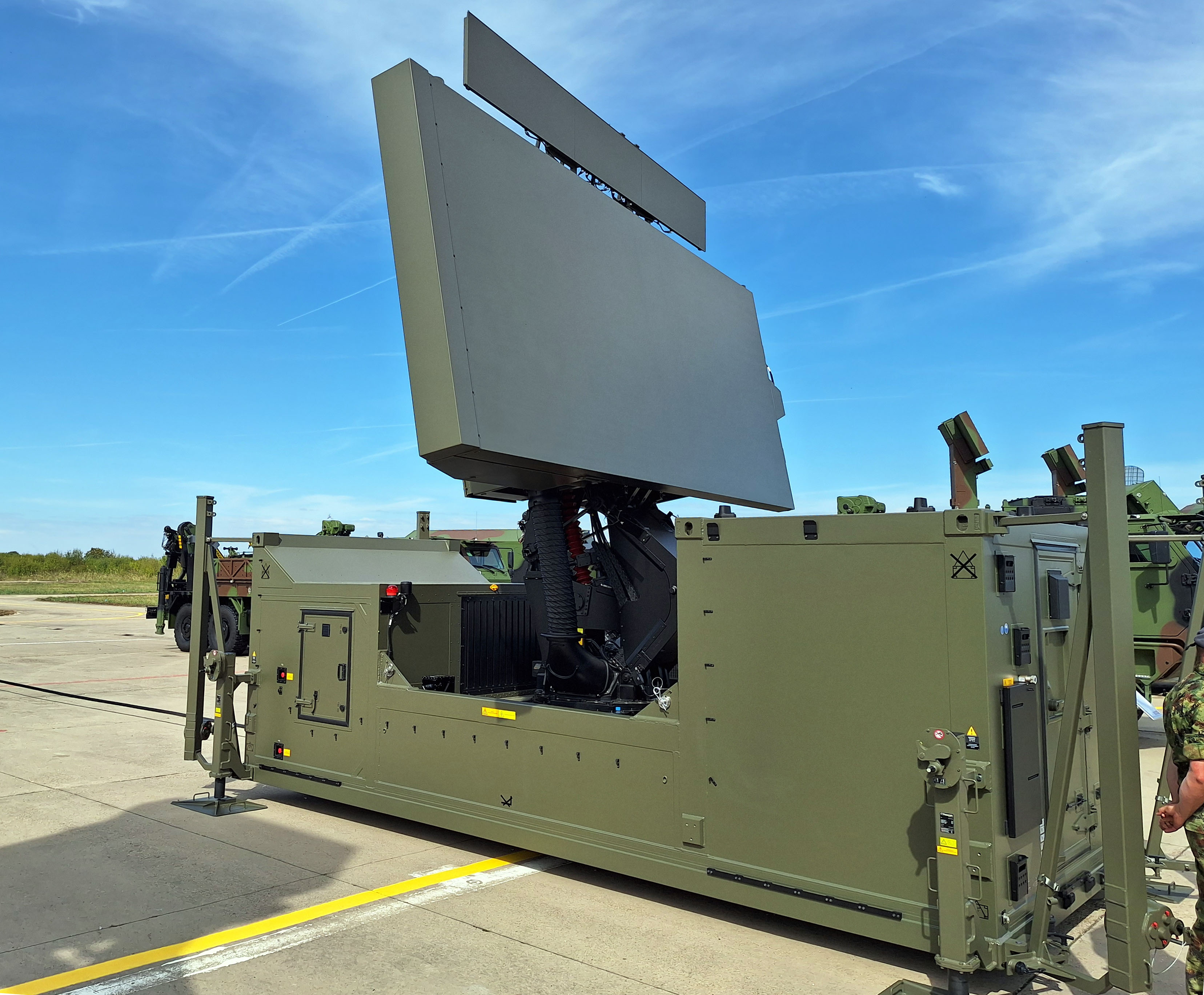
Ground Master 400α long-range radar system

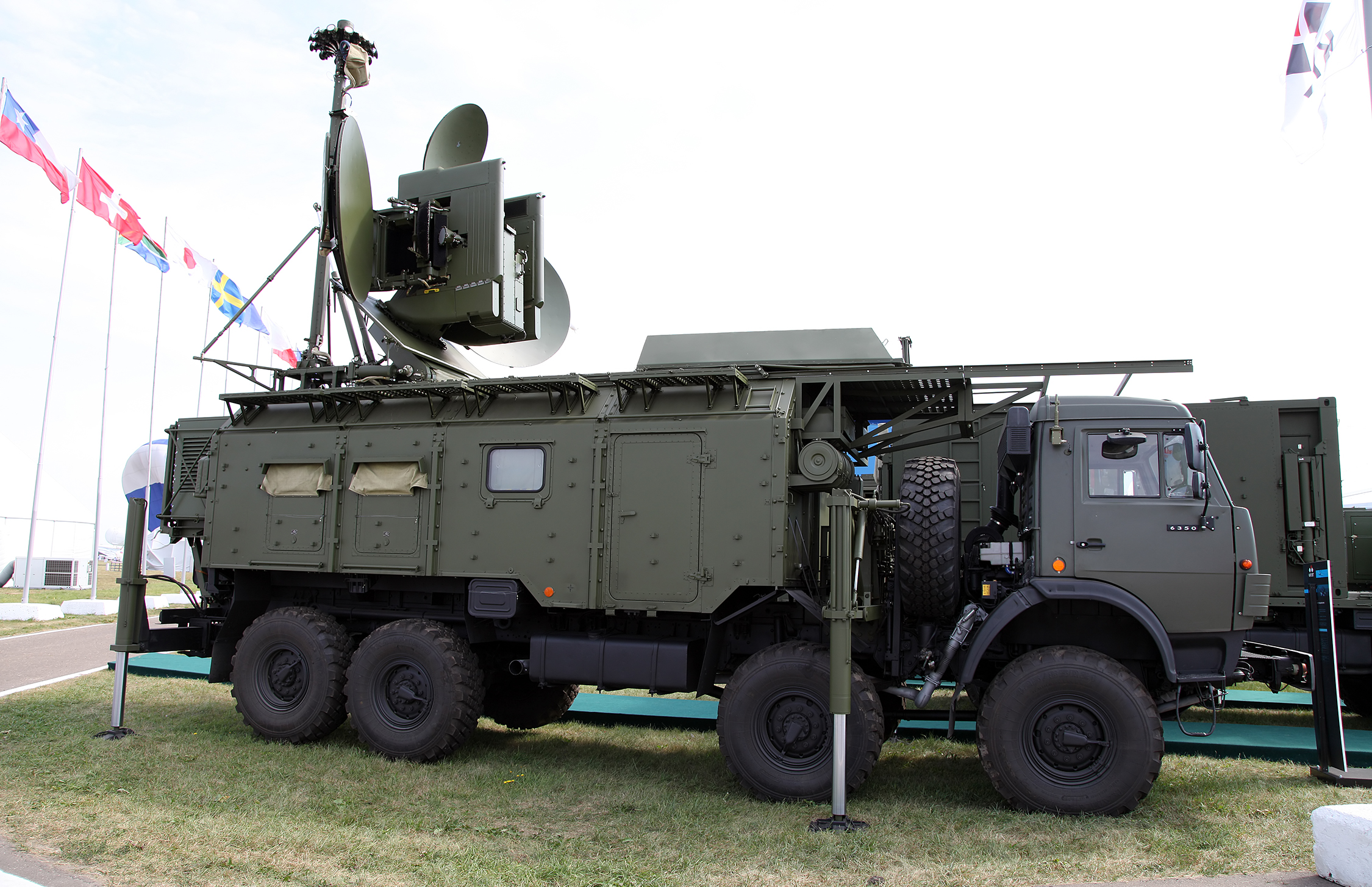
Krasukha electronic warfare system

== Traditions ==
=== Motto ===
Motto of the Serbian Armed Forces is "For Freedom and Honour of the Fatherland" (Za slobodu i čast Otadžbine) and is found on uniforms as well as on brigade flags.

=== Armed Forces Day ===
Serbian Armed Forces Day (Dan Vojske Srbije) is marked on 23 April, the anniversary of the Second Serbian Uprising. On that day in 1815, in Takovo, prominent elders met and decided to start the fight for liberation of Serbia from the Turkish authorities, which eventually led to the free and independent Serbia.

=== Patron saint ===
The patron saint (krsna slava) of the Serbian Armed Forces is Saint Stefan Visoki. The first celebration was held in 2023; earlier that year, the Holy Council of Bishops of the Serbian Orthodox Church decided that the patron saint of the Serbian Armed Forces should be Saint Stefan Visoki, 15th-century Serbian ruler and saint, remembered as a wise statesman and a successful military leader.

=== Marches and marching music ===
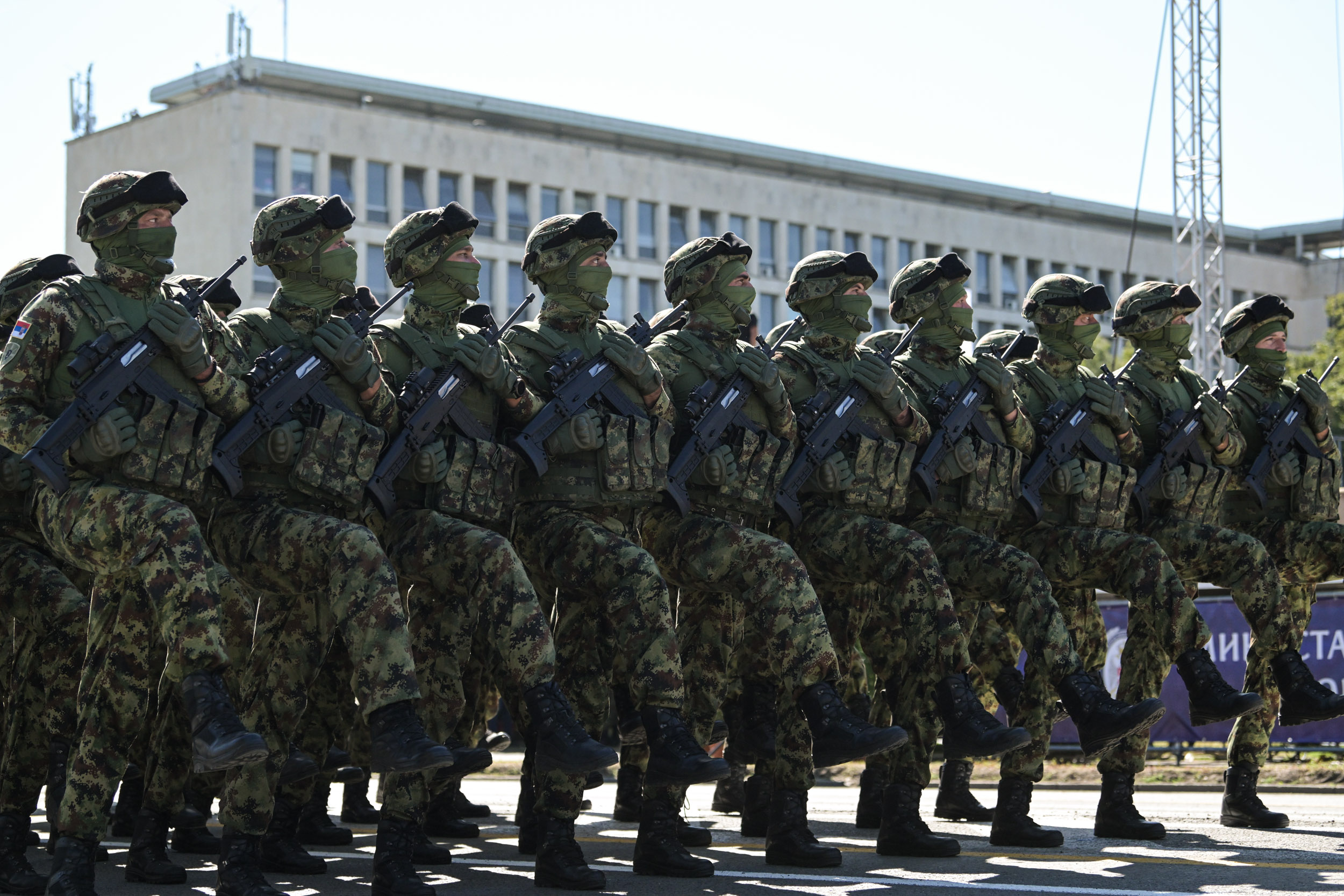
The high-stepping Parade March in the 2025 Snaga jedinstva military parade

The Serbian military was the first to pioneer the high-step as a military step. It is similar to the goose step, with the difference being that the knee is bent at the top of the arc. It was used by the Royal Yugoslav Army and at the time was called the "male step". The Yugoslav People's Army abandoned it after World War II, being in use for over two decades before being replaced by high-stepping in the 1975 Victory Day Parade, to assert itself as independent from Soviet influence. High-stepping is still used today by Serbian Armed Forces.

There are several marches in use in Serbian Armed Forces. The standard one is Parade March (Paradni marš), while the Guard uses its own Guard March (Gardijski marš) as standard march music. Also frequently used and the most popular and recognizable by the general public in Serbia is famous March on the Drina (Marš na Drinu). Other frequently used march is Vojvoda Stepa Stepanović March (Marš vojvode Stepe Stepanovića).

== Deployments ==
The Serbian Armed Forces actively take part in numerous multinational peacekeeping missions.

Country	Mission	Number of personnel
Cyprus	UNFICYP	1 staff officer, 2 observers, 6 non-commissioned officers and 37 infantry
Central African Republic	MINUSCA	3 staff officers, 2 observers, 68 medical infantry
Central African Republic	EUTM RCA	7 medical infantry
DR Congo	MONUC	2 staff officers, 2 doctors and 4 technicians
Lebanon	UNIFIL	8 staff officers, 5 national support element and 164 infantry
Liberia	UNMIL	1 officer as military observer
Mali	EUTM Mali	3 medical infantry
Middle East	UNTSO	1 officer
Somalia	EUTM Somalia	1 staff officer, 1 doctor and 3 medical technicians
Somalia	EUNAVFOR	4 OHQ staff officers, 1 OHQ non-commissioned officer, 2 FHQ staff officers and 12 members of AVPD

== See also ==
- Military history of Serbia
- Military ranks of Serbia
