= Training Command (Serbia) =

- Команда за обуку
- Emblem of the Training Command
- Active: 2007–present
- Country: Serbia
- Type: Military training
- Size: 2,300
- Part of: Serbian Armed Forces
- Garrison/HQ: Topčider (Belgrade)
- Anniversaries: April 23

Commanders
- Chief of the Staff: Brigade General Dragiša Zlatković
- Training Sergeant Major: Warrant officer 1st class Bratislav Drenovac

The Training Command (Serbian: Команда за обуку, romanized: Komanda za obuku) is the command responsible for training members of the Serbian Armed Forces.

== History ==
The Training Command was established on 23 April 2007, by merging training units of the Operational Forces, the Serbian Army and the Serbian Air Force and Air Defence.

== Missions ==
Training Command is primary responsible for providing soldiers, non-commissioned officer and officers of Serbian Armed Forces, as well the members of foreign armies basic and specialist military training.

== Structure ==
The structure of the Training Command is three basic training centers, six specialist military training centers, four (reserve) territorial brigades as well as seven exercise ranges, all located throughout the country.

The basic training center consists of one command company and one training battalion.

Specialist training centers include: the Army Training Center (in addition to one command company and one training battalion, it is extended for battalion dedicated to training and development of Army non-commissioned officers); Air Force and Air Defense Training Center (consisted of command platoon, three air defence batteries, anti-aircraft artillery battery, air reconnaissance/intelligence and guidance company, and air force technical services training company); Informatics, Signals and Electronic Warfare Training Center (consisted of command platoon, training center, development center, and logistics company); NBC Defence Training Center (made of command company and development company); and Logistics Training Center (consisted of command company, company for training of intendant service, company for training of sanitation and veterinary service, company for training of technical service, and battalion for training of traffic service).

Basic Training Center Specialist Training Center
Reserve Training Center (Territorial Brigade) Training Ground

Territorial brigades constitute active reserve with active HQ, command company and logistics company predicted for rapid deployment in case of war. These brigades prepare mobilization of war units, conduct training of war commands and units, conduct training of temporary units, securing objects, people and equipment as well as providing logistics support.

In addition, there are training grounds and ranges, of which only "Pasuljanske Livade" Multibranch Training Ground is seaparate unit with its own command, logistics and security platoons.

- Basic Training Centers
  - 1st Training Center (Sombor)
  - 2nd Training Center (Valjevo)
  - 3rd Training Center (Leskovac)
- Specialist Training Centers
  - Army Training Center (Požarevac)
  - Air Force and Air Defence Training Center (Batajnica Air Base)
  - Informatics, Signals, and Electronic Warfare Training Center (Gornji Milanovac)
  - NBC Defence Training Center (Kruševac)
  - Logistics Training Center (Kruševac)
  - Non-commissioned Officers Training Center (Pančevo)
- Reserve Training Centers (Territorial Brigades)
  - Command for rapid deployment of Banat Brigade (Zrenjanin)
  - Command for rapid deployment of Belgrade Brigade (Jakovo)
  - Command for rapid deployment of Timok Brigade (Zaječar)
  - Command for rapid deployment of Rasina Brigade (Kruševac)
- Training Grounds
  - Pasuljanske Livade Multibranch Training Ground (near Ćuprija)
  - Orešac Army Training Ground (near Bela Crkva)
  - Mogila Army Training Ground (near Požarevac)
  - Peskovi Army Training Ground (near Veliko Gradište)
  - Međa Army Training Ground (near Doljevac)
  - Vrtogoš Army Training Ground (near Bujanovac)
  - Borovac Army Training Ground (near Bujanovac)
