= Repellent-1 =

Russian anti-UAV electronic warfare system

Repellent-1 Репеллент-1
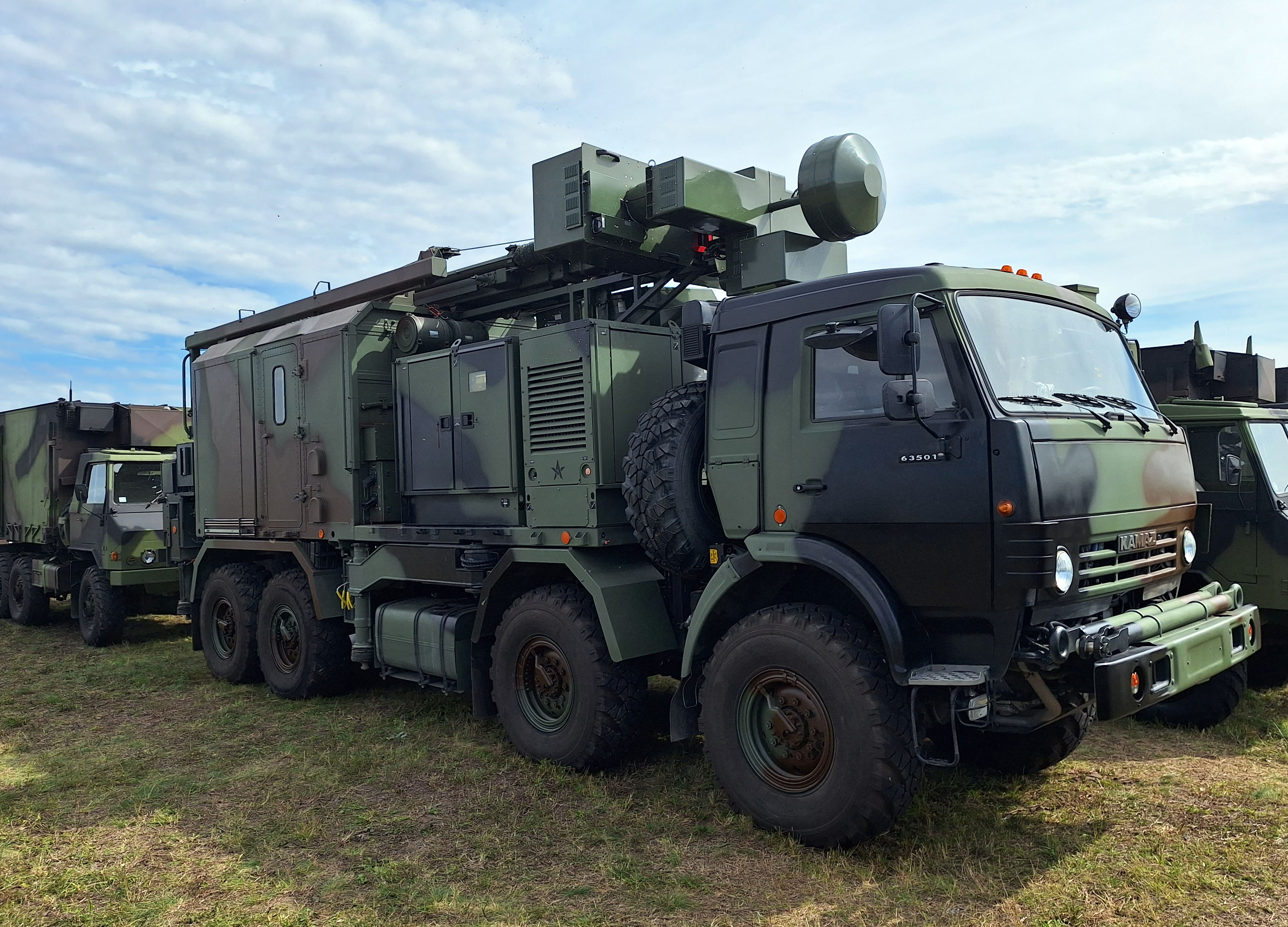
- Repellent-1 of the Serbian Armed Forces
- Type: Electronic warfare and anti-UAV system
- Place of origin: Russia

Service history
- Wars: Russian-Ukrainian war; Russian invasion of Ukraine; Armenian-Azerbaijani border conflict

Production history
- Produced: 2016–present

Repellent-1 (Russian: Репеллент-1) is a Russian electronic warfare system designed to suppress the operation of unmanned aerial vehicles at a distance of up to 30 to 35 km (19 to 22 mi). It weighs more than 20 tons.

The system is capable of detecting miniature air targets from their control signals at a distance of more than 35 km (22 mi), but is able to suppress drones only at a distance of not more than 2.5 km (1.6 mi). The cabin is protected against small arms fire and NBC (nuclear, bacteriological and chemical) agents.

== History ==
The Repellent-1 was developed by the Russian Scientific and Technical Center for Electronic Combat (Russian: Научно-техническом центре радиоэлектронной борьбы). It is installed on the chassis of MAZ (MAZ-6317) or KAMAZ depending on the wishes of the customer.

The system's development was completed in 2016 and it was later shown at an arms fair.

== Operational history ==
=== War in Donbas ===
On August 11, 2018, the OSCE SMM noted in a report that one of its UAVs had detected four electronic warfare systems near the village of Chornukhyne on July 28, including the Repellent-1.

=== Armenian–Azerbaijani border conflict ===
Armenia lost two Repellent-1 operating stations during the 2021–2022 Armenia–Azerbaijan border crisis.

=== Russo–Ukrainian war ===
On May 1, 2022, it was reported that a Russian Repellent-1 had been destroyed as part of the Russo–Ukrainian war.

== Operators ==
- Algeria
- Armenia
- Azerbaijan
- Kazakhstan - a supply contract was signed in 2016.
- Russia
- Serbia

== See also ==
- Krasukha (electronic warfare system)
- Divnomorya (electronic warfare system)
- Shypshyna-AERO
