= Krasukha =

Russian electronic countermeasure system

1L269 Krasukha-2/4 1Л269 Красуха-2/4
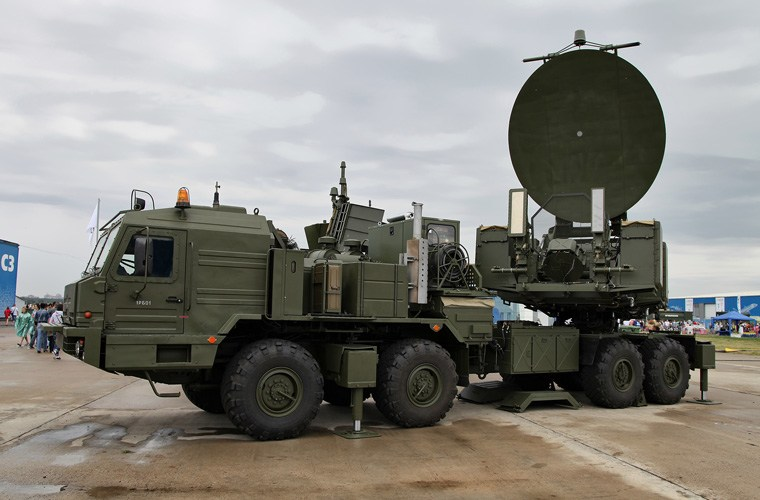
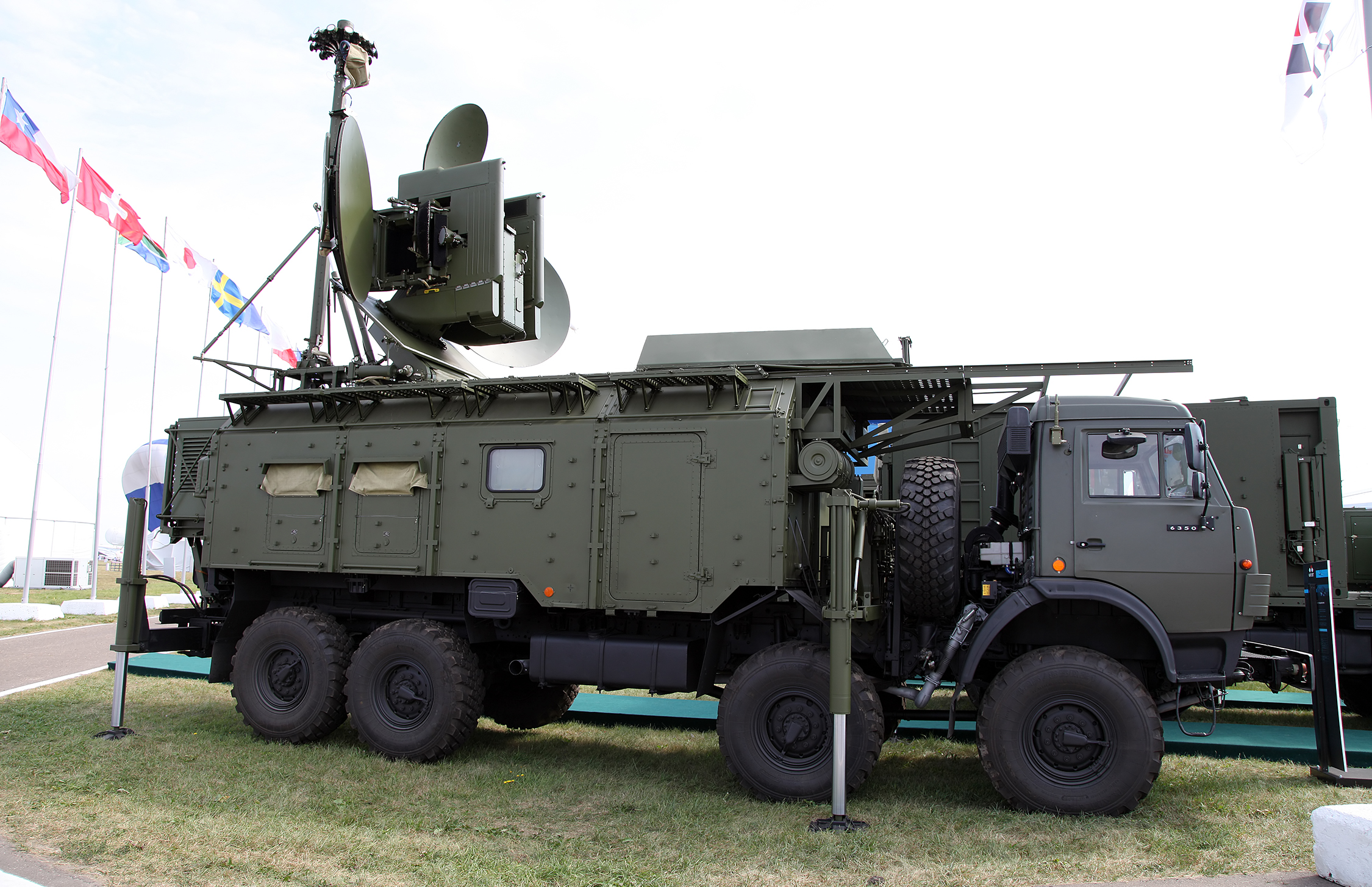
- Krasukha-2 and 4 at Engineering Technologies 2014
- Type: Electronic counter-measure system
- Place of origin: Russia

Service history
- In service: 2014–present
- Used by: Russian Federation

Production history
- Designer: KRET corporation
- Manufacturer: KRET corporation, BAZ (for wheeled platform of Krasukha-4)
- Produced: 2010–present
- Variants: 1L269 Krasukha-2; 1RL257 Krasukha-4

Specifications
- Operational range: Krasukha-2: 250 km; Krasukha-4: 300 km

The Krasukha (Russian: Красуха; English: Belladonna or Deadly Nightshade) is a Russian mobile, ground-based, electronic warfare (EW) system. This system is produced by the KRET corporation on different wheeled platforms. The Krasukha's primary targets are airborne radio-electronics (such as UAVs) and airborne systems guided by radar. The Krasukha has multiple applications in the Russian Armed Forces, has been deployed beyond Russia's borders, and supplied to additional armed forces, such as those of Iran.

== Krasukha-2 ==
The Krasukha-2 is an S-band system designed to jam Airborne Early Warning and Control (AWACS) aircraft such as the Boeing E-3 Sentry at ranges of up to 250 kilometres (160 mi). The Krasukha-2 can also jam other airborne radars, such as those for radar-guided missiles. The missiles, once jammed, then receive a false target away from the original to ensure that the missiles no longer pose a threat. The Krasukha-2 guards mobile high-priority targets such as the 9K720 Iskander SRBM.

== Krasukha-4 ==
The Krasukha-4 is a broadband multifunctional jamming station mounted on a BAZ-6910-022 four-axle-chassis. It complements the Krasukha-2 system by operating in the X-band and Ku-band, and counters airborne radar aircraft such as the Joint Surveillance Target Attack Radar System (JSTAR) Northrop Grumman E-8. The Krasukha-4 has enough range to effectively disrupt low Earth orbit (LEO) satellites and can cause permanent damage to targeted radio-electronic devices. Ground based radars are also a viable target for the Krasukha-4.

== Operational history ==
Krasukha jammers were reportedly deployed to support Russian forces in Syria. They have reportedly been blocking small U.S. surveillance drones from receiving GPS satellite signals. During the Turkish intervention in the Syrian civil war, the complex apparently destroyed a Bayraktar drone by causing it to lose control, subsequently crashing. The Israeli Defense Force had problems in 2021 with the Krasukha S-4 GPS denial system, which led to Israel's successful development of non-GPS weapons targeting and anti-GPS-jamming technology.

In July 2018, an OSCE monitoring mission drone recorded a 1L269 Krasukha-2 among other electronic warfare equipment deployed near Chornukhyne, Ukraine.

In 2018, Russia’s Krasukha-4 microwave cannon reportedly grounded an American AH-64 Apache attack helicopter in Syria by damaging its electrical circuits.

In 2020, Krasukha was claimed (without evidence) to have operated around the Russian military base at Gyumri in Armenia to counter the use by Azerbaijan of Turkish-made Bayraktar TB2 armed drones as well as Israel-made Harop loitering munition (suicide drones).

The first export contract was officially signed in August 2021.

Krasukha-4 models are also being employed in the ongoing Russian invasion of Ukraine, as Ukrainian forces captured one of these devices in the field near Kyiv. A photograph posted to social media claims to show part of the system, which has been separated from its truck mount and shows some damage. The unit was then sent to the United States for examination.

On 9 August 2023, a source in the Russian defense industry told the state news agency TASS that several Southeast Asian nations and an Eastern European country have ordered the Krasukha and Sapphire EW systems.

In August 2025, it was confirmed that Russia had supplied Iran with Krasukha EW systems.

== Operators ==
- Algeria
- Ethiopia
- Iran
- Libya
- Russia
- Serbia
- Vietnam

== See also ==
- Repellent-1
- KORAL
