= Propaganda during the Yugoslav Wars =

During the Yugoslav Wars (1991–2001), propaganda was widely used in the media of the Federal Republic of Yugoslavia, and, to a lesser extent, of Croatia and Bosnia.

Throughout the conflicts, all sides used propaganda as a tool. The media in the former Yugoslavia was divided along ethnic lines, and only a few independent voices countered the nationalist rhetoric.

Propaganda was prominently used by Slobodan Milošević and his regime in Serbia. He began his efforts to control the media in the late 1980s, and by 1991, he had successfully consolidated Radio Television of Serbia and the other Serbian media, which largely became a mouthpiece for his regime. Part of the International Criminal Tribunal for the former Yugoslavia's indictment against Milošević charged him with having used the media for propaganda purposes.

In Croatia, the media included the state's main public broadcaster, Croatian Radio and Television, and it largely came under the control of Franjo Tuđman and his party, the Croatian Democratic Union (HDZ). The Croatian media engaged in propaganda during both the Croatian War of Independence and the Bosnian War.

Some analysts have also claimed that propaganda tactics were used by the Western media in covering of the wars, particularly in its negative portrayal of Serbs during the conflicts.

== Background and analysis ==
During the Breakup of Yugoslavia, the media played a critical role in swaying public opinion on the conflict. Media controlled by state regimes helped foster an environment that made war possible by attacking civic principles, fueling fear of ethnic violence and engineering consent. Although all sides in the Yugoslav Wars used propaganda, the regime of Slobodan Milošević played a leading role in its dissemination. In 1987, Milošević began to use state television to portray the Socialist Federal Republic of Yugoslavia as "anti-Serb", which prompted rival propaganda from Croatia and from Bosnia and Herzegovina. Most media outlets were complicit in those tactics, succumbed to their respective ethnic and political parties and acted as tools for nationalist propaganda. The exceptions were a handful of independent media.

There were a number of prominent media scandals in the 1980s, such as the Đorđe Martinović incident of 1985 and the Vojko i Savle affair of 1987. The SANU Memorandum gained prominence after it had been leaked in the mainstream media in 1986.

Long before the conflict in Croatia had broken out, both Serbian and Croatian media primed their audiences for violence and armed conflict by airing stories of World War II atrocities perpetrated by the other. Thus, in the Croatian media, Serbs represented Chetniks (or occasionally Partisans), and in the Serbian media, Croats were portrayed as Ustaše. Once the fighting began, those were the labels routinely used in media war reports from both sides; they instilled hatred and fear among the populace. The Serbian and Croatian propaganda campaigns also reinforced each other. The nationalist rhetoric put forth by Croatian President Franjo Tudjman and other Croatian public figures before and after the 1990 Croatian parliamentary election helped Milošević. Likewise, Milošević's policies in Croatia provoked nationalist sentiment among Croats, which Tudjman used to his advantage. In 1990, the path to war began to be drummed up by Serbian and Croatian nationalists alike and later by Bosnian Muslims as well.

Both Milošević and Tudjman seized control of the media in their respective republics and used news reports from newspapers, radio and television to fan the flames of hatred. The journalist Maggie O'Kane noted how both leaders were aware of the importance of instigating propaganda campaigns "that would prepare the country of Tito's children – essentially an ethnically mixed country – for the division of the Yugoslav ideal". Regarding the state of the media in both Serbia and Croatia at the time, Kemal Kurspahić wrote:

The dominant media in both republics – state radio and television as well as state dailies such as Politika and Politika ekspres in Belgrade and Vjesnik and Večernji list in Zagreb—were fully in line for an all out "us versus them" showdown. In the newsroom, there was no space for or interest in "the other's" concern or point of view, not even a pretense of objectivity or curiosity to hear another side of the story, and no questioning or criticism of what "our side" was doing.

In Bosnia, the media was also divided along ethnic lines, which helped prolong the Bosnian War and was an obstacle to achieving peace.

Various propaganda tactics were used by the warring sides in the Yugoslav Wars like exaggerated reports of war crimes. For instance, both the Bosnian Muslim and Serbian media reported that their babies were used as food to zoo animals. Victims of massacres were misrepresented as members of their own ethnic group or that the other side had killed its own people for propaganda purposes. All sides used documentaries and films to support their own agendas.

== Serbian media ==
In the International Criminal Tribunal for the former Yugoslavia (ICTY), one of the indictments against Serbian President Slobodan Milošević was his use of the Serbian state-run mass media to create an atmosphere of fear and hatred in Yugoslavia's Orthodox Serbs by spreading "exaggerated and false messages of ethnically based attacks by Bosnian Muslims and Catholic Croats against the Serb people...".

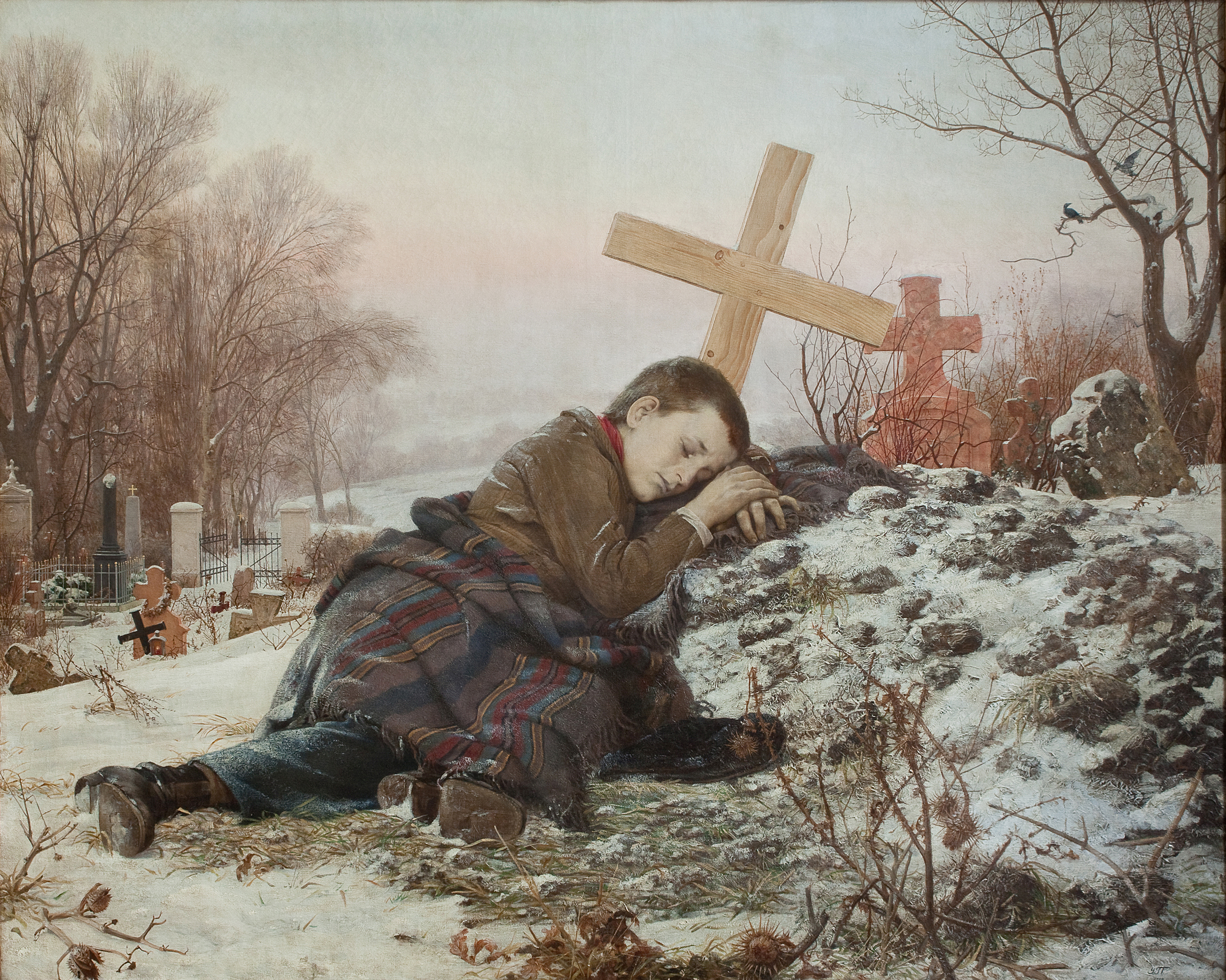
During the Bosnian War, Serbian newspaper Večernje novosti published a war report supposedly from Bosnia illustrated with Uroš Predić's 1888 painting (below) presented as an actual photograph (above) of a "Serbian boy whose whole family was killed by Bosnian Muslims". The original title of Predić's painting is "Siroče na majčinom grobu" (Orphan at mother's grave).

=== Milošević's reign and control of Serbian media ===
Milošević began his efforts to gain control over the media in 1986 to 1987, a process that had been completed by the summer of 1991. In 1992, Radio Television Belgrade, together with Radio Television Novi Sad (RTNS) and Radio Television Pristina (RTP), became part of Radio Television of Serbia, a centralized and closely-governed network, which was intended to be a loudspeaker for Milošević's policies. During the 1990s, Dnevnik (Daily News) was used to promote the "wise politics of Slobodan Milošević" and to attack "the servants of Western powers and the forces of chaos and despair", the Serbian opposition.

According to Danielle S. Sremac, contrary to the Croats and the Bosnians, Serbian public relations efforts were nonexistent, as the Milošević government held a disdain for the Western press. However, Wise Communications in Washington represented Serbia's interests by a contract with the Serbian-owned oil company Jugopetrol until sanctions were imposed by the UN embargo on Serbia. Bill Wise, the president of the firm, stated, "We arranged television interviews and placed articles in US publications for Slobodan Milosevic. Part of our role was to get some balance to the information coming out of Yugoslavia". A group of Serbian businessmen hired Ian Greer Associates to organise a lobby of Westminster, communicate the Serbian message and prevent economic sanctions by the European Economic Community. It stopped working as well when the UN imposed sanctions in June 1992. Other PR activities included Burson-Marsteller, which handled the media and political relations for the visit of the new Yugoslav prime minister, Milan Panić, and a host of Serbian information centres and individual lobbyists from both sides.

According to Professor Renaud De la Brosse, a senior lecturer at the University of Reims, a witness called by the ICTY's Office of the Prosecutor, Serbian authorities used media as a weapon in their military campaign. "In Serbia specifically, the use of media for nationalist ends and objectives formed part of a well thought through plan - itself part of a strategy of conquest and affirmation of identity". According to de la Bosse, nationalist ideology defined the Serbs partly according to a historical myth, based on the defeat of Serbia by the Ottoman forces at the Battle of Kosovo in 1389, and partly on the Genocide of Serbs committed during World War II by the Croatian fascist Ustashe, which governed the Independent State of Croatia. The Croatians' desire for independence fed the flames of fear, especially in Serbian-majority regions of Croatia. According to de la Bosse, the new Serbian identity became one in opposition to the "others": Croats (collapsed into Ustashe) and Muslims (collapsed into Poturice). Even Croatian democracy was dismissed since "Hitler came to power in Germany within the framework of a multi-party mechanism but subsequently became a great dictator, aggressor and criminal" Terms such as "genocidal", "fascistoid", "heir of Ustaše leader Ante Pavelić" and "neo-Ustaše Croatian viceroy" were used by the Serbian media to describe Croatian President Franjo Tudjman. By contrast, Milošević was described as "wise", "decisive", "unwavering" and "the person who was restoring national dignity to the Serbian people".

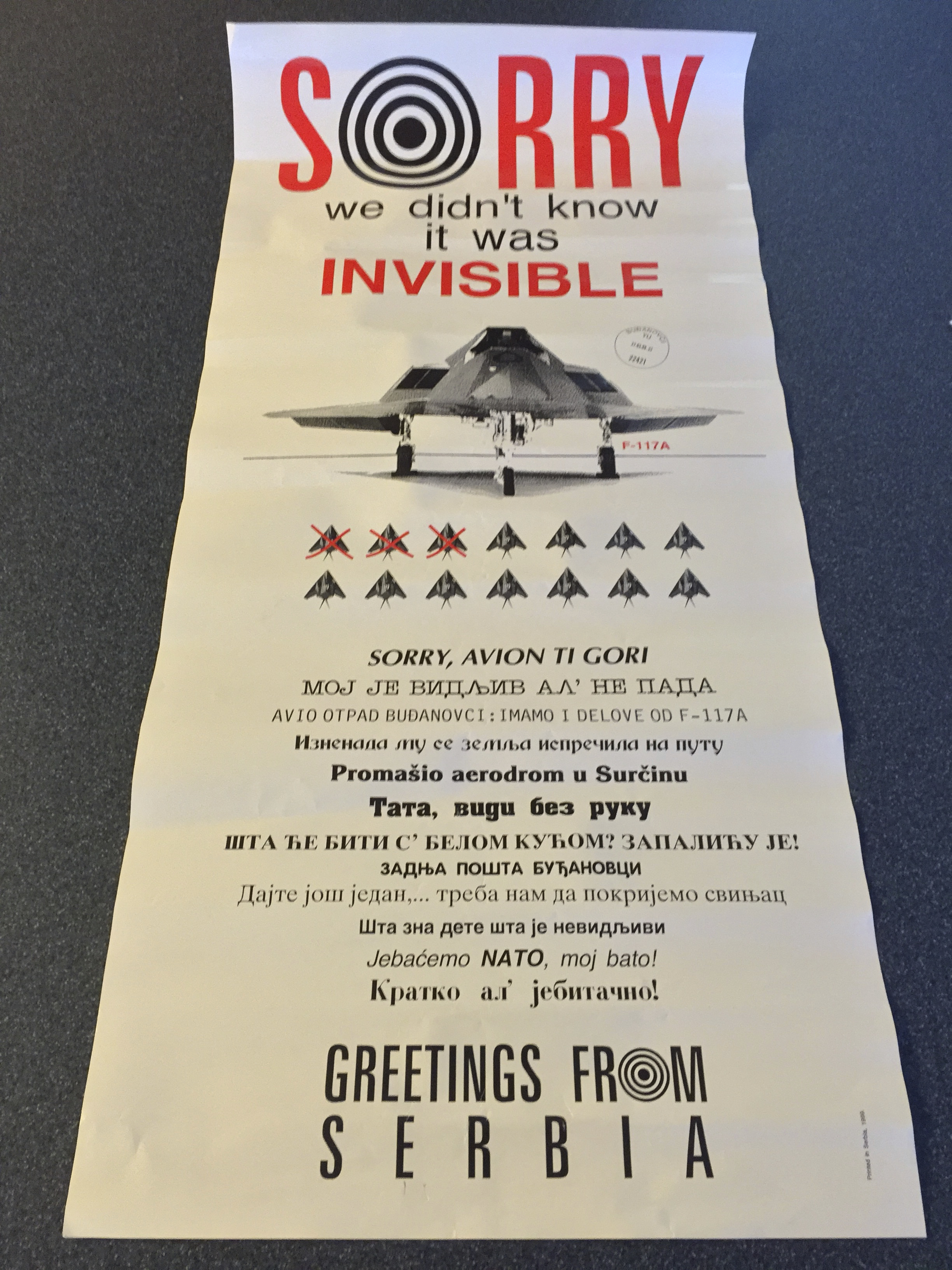
A propaganda poster celebrating the 1999 shootdown of the NATO F-117 Nighthawk during NATO bombing of Serbia in 1999.

Milošević, before the Kosovo War, allowed independent print media to publish, but their distribution was limited. His methods of controlling the media included creating shortages of paper, interfering with or stopping supplies and equipment and confiscating newspapers for being printed without proper licenses or other reasons. For publicly-owned media, he could dismiss, promote, demote or publicly condemn journalists. In 1998, he adopted a media law that created a special misdemeanor court to try violations and had the ability to impose heavy fines and to confiscate property if they were not immediately paid. Human Rights Watch reported that five independent newspaper editors were charged with disseminating misinformation because they had referred to Albanians who had died in Kosovo as "people", rather than "terrorists". The government crackdown on independent media intensified when NATO forces were threatening intervention in Kosovo in late September and early October. Furthermore, the government also maintained direct control of state radio and television, which provided news for most of the population. According to the report by de la Brosse, the Milošević-controlled media reached more than 3.5 million people every day. Given that and the lack of access to alternative news, de la Brosse states that it is surprising how great the resistance to Milošević's propaganda was among Serbs, as evidenced not only in massive demonstrations in Serbia in 1991 and 1996–97, both of which almost toppled the regime, but also in widespread draft resistance and desertion from the military. More than 50,000 people participated in many anti-war protests in Belgrade, and more than 150,000 people took part in the most massive protest, "The Black Ribbon March", in solidarity with people in Sarajevo. It is estimated that between 50,000 and 200,000 people deserted from the Yugoslav People's Army, and between 100,000 and 150,000 people emigrated from Serbia for refusing to participate in the war.

De la Brosse describes how RTS (Radio Television of Serbia) portrayed events in Dubrovnik and Sarajevo: "The images shown of Dubrovnik came with a commentary accusing those from the West who had taken the film of manipulation and of having had a tire burnt in front of their cameras to make it seem that the city was on fire. As for the shells fired at Sarajevo and the damage caused, for several months it was simply as if it had never happened in the eyes of Serbian television viewers because Belgrade television would show pictures of the city taken months and even years beforehand to deny that it had ever occurred". The Serbian public was fed similar disinformation about Vukovar, according to a former Reuters correspondent, Daniel Deluce: "Serbian Radio Television created a strange universe in which Sarajevo, the Bosnian capital, had never been besieged and in which the devastated Croatian town of Vukovar had been 'liberated'".

The ICTY judgement in the sentencing of Milan Babić, the first president of the Republic of Serbian Krajina, a self-proclaimed Serbian dominated entity within Croatia, declared:

Babić made ethnically based inflammatory speeches during public events and in the media that added to the atmosphere of fear and hatred amongst Serbs living in Croatia and convinced them that they could only be safe in a state of their own. Babic stated that during the events, and in particular at the beginning of his political career, he was strongly influenced and misled by Serbian propaganda, which repeatedly referred to an imminent threat of genocide by the Croatian regime against the Serbs in Croatia, thus creating an atmosphere of hatred and fear of the Croats. Ultimately this kind of propaganda led to the unleashing of violence against the Croat population and other non-Serbs.

— The ICTY in its judgement against Milan Babić

Željko Kopanja, the editor of the independent newspaper Nezavisne Novine, was seriously hurt by a car bomb after he had published stories detailing atrocities committed by Serbs against Bosniaks during the Bosnian War. He believed that the bomb was planted by Serbia's security services to stop him from publishing further stories. An FBI investigation supported his suspicions.

=== Serbian propaganda cases ===
==== "Pakrac genocide" case ====
During the Pakrac clash, the Serbian newspaper Večernje novosti reported that about 40 Serb civilians had been killed in Pakrac on 2 March 1991 by the Croatian forces. The story was widely accepted by the public and by some ministers in the Serbian government like Dragutin Zelenović. The report could not be confirmed in other media from all seven municipalities with the name "Pakrac" in the former Yugoslavia.

==== "Vukovar baby massacre" case ====
A day before the execution of 264 Croatian prisoners-of-war and civilians in the Ovčara massacre, Serbian media reported that 40 Serb babies had been killed in Vukovar. Dr. Vesna Bosanac, the head of Vukovar hospital from which the Croatian prisoners-of-war and civilians were taken, said she believed the story of slaughtered babies was released intentionally to incite Serbian nationalists to execute Croats.

==== "Dubrovnik 30,000 Ustaše" case ====
A Yugoslav People's Army soldier reads the propaganda of Pobjeda in which the newspaper describes Ustaše hiding behind the walls of Dubrovnik.

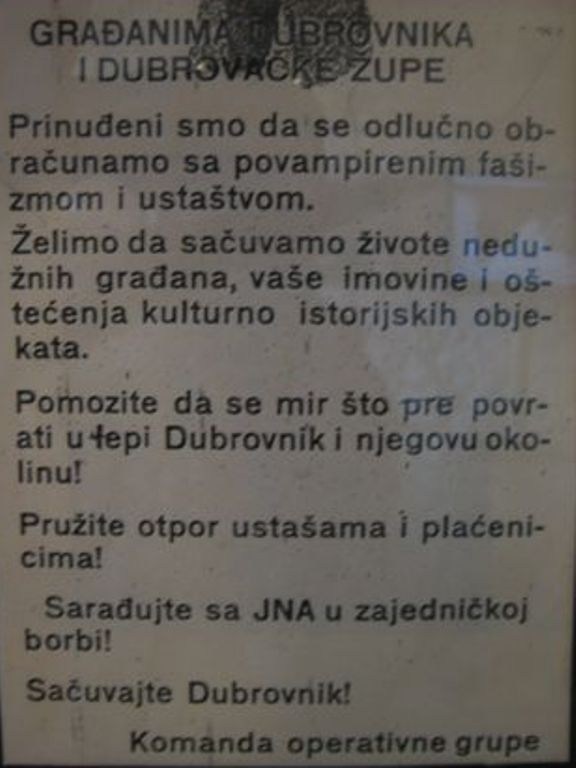
A flyer calling upon citizens of Dubrovnik to co-operate with the Yugoslav People's Army against the Croats' "vampired fascism and Ustašism"

Before the Siege of Dubrovnik, Yugoslav officers (namely Pavle Strugar) made a concerted effort at misrepresenting the military situation on the ground and exaggerated the "threat" of a Croatian attack on Montenegro by "30,000 armed Ustaše and 7000 terrorists, including Kurdish mercenaries". That propaganda was widely spread by the state-controlled media of Yugoslavia.

In reality, Croatian military forces at the area in September were virtually non-existent. The Croat forces consisted of just one locally-conscripted unit, which numbered less than 1,500 men and had no tanks or heavy guns. Also, there were no mercenaries, Kurdish or otherwise, fighting for the Croats.

==== "Dubrovnik burning tires" case ====
During the Siege of Dubrovnik in 1991, the Yugoslav Army shelled the Croatian port town, and Radio Television of Serbia showed Dubrovnik with columns of smoke and claimed that the local people were burning automobile tires to simulate the destruction of the city.

==== "Fourth Reich" and "Vatican conspiracy" ====
The Belgrade-based media sometimes reported about the alleged conspiracy of "foreign forces" to destroy Yugoslavia. In one instance, TV Belgrade showed Tuđman shaking hands with German Chancellor Helmut Kohl and accused them of plotting to impose "a Fourth Reich", and even the Holy See was blamed for "supporting secessionists". As a consequence, in September 1991, the German and Vatican embassies were targets of Serbian protesters, who shouted, "Pope John Paul II supports neo-fascism in Croatia".

==== Operation Opera Orientalis ====
During the notorious false-flag Operation Opera Orientalis, which was conducted in 1991 by the Yugoslav Air Force intelligence service, the Serbian media repeatedly made false accusations in which Croatia was connected with World War II, fascism, Nazism and anti-Semitism with the aim to discredit the Croatian demands for independence in the West.

==== 1992 Tuđman quote about "Croatia wanting the war" ====
The Serbian media emphasized that Croatian President Franjo Tuđman had started the war in Croatia. To corroborate that notion, the media repeatedly referenced his speech in Zagreb on 24 May 1992 and claimed that he had allegedly said, "There would not have been a war had Croatia not wanted one". During their trials at the ICTY, Slobodan Milošević and Milan Martić also frequently resorted to Tuđman's quote to prove their innocence.

However, the ICTY prosecutors obtained the integral tape of his speech, played it in its entirety during Martić's trial on 23 October 2006, and proved that Tuđman had never said that Croatia "wanted the war". Upon playing that tape, Borislav Đukić was forced to admit that Tuđman had not said what had been claimed. The quote is actually the following: "Some individuals in the world who were not friends of Croatia claimed that we too were responsible for the war. And I replied to them: Yes, there would not have been a war had we given up our goal to create a sovereign and independent Croatia. We suggested that our goal should be achieved without war, and that the Yugoslav crisis should be resolved by transforming the federation, in which nobody was satisfied, particularly not the Croatian nation, into a union of sovereign countries in which Croatia would be sovereign, with its own army, own money, own diplomacy. They did not accept".

==== "Bosnian mujahideen" case ====
Serbian propaganda during the Bosnian War portrayed the Bosnian Muslims as violent extremists and Islamic fundamentalists. After a series of massacres of Bosniaks, a few hundred (between 300 and 1,500) Arabic-speaking mercenaries primarily from the Middle East and North Africa, called Mujahideen, came into Bosnia in the second half of 1992 with the aim of helping "their Muslim brothers". The Serb media, however, reported a much larger number of mujahideen and presented them as terrorists and a huge threat to European security to inflame anti-Muslim hatred among Serbs and other Christians. No indictment was issued by the ICTY against any of the foreign volunteers. However, cases of mujahideen units perpetrating war crimes, including the killing, torture and beheading of Serbian and Croat civilians and soldiers, have been documented. A former commander of the Bosnian Army, Rasim Delić, was sentenced to three years in prison by the ICTY, partly for crimes committed by a mujahideen unit that was part of his division, which had tortured, beheaded and mutilated captured Serb prisoners.

==== "Prijedor monster doctors" case ====
Just before the Prijedor massacre of Bosniak and Croatian civilians, Serbian propaganda characterized prominent non-Serbs as criminals and extremists who should be punished for their behaviour. Dr. Mirsad Mujadžić, a Bosniak politician, was accused of injecting drugs into Serbian women to make them incapable of conceiving male children, which in turn contributed to a reduction in the birth rate among Serbs. Also, Dr. Željko Sikora, a Croat, referred to as the Monster Doctor, was accused of forcing abortions onto Serbian women if they were pregnant with male children and of castrating the male babies of Serbian parents. Moreover, in a "Kozarski Vjesnik" article dated 10 June 1992, Dr. Osman Mahmuljin was accused of deliberately having provided incorrect medical care to his Serb colleague, Dr. Živko Dukić, who had a heart attack.

Mile Mutić, the director of Kozarski Vjesnik, and the journalist Rade Mutić regularly attended meetings of Serb politicians to get informed on the next steps of spreading propaganda.

==== "Markale conspiracy" case ====
The Markale massacres were two artillery attacks on civilians at the Markale marketplace, committed by the Army of Republika Srpska during the Siege of Sarajevo. Encouraged by the initial United Nations Protection Force report, Serbian media claimed that the Bosnian government had shelled its own civilians to get the Western powers to intervene against the Serbs. However, in January 2003, the ICTY concluded that the massacre had been committed by Serbian forces around Sarajevo. Although widely reported by the international media, the verdict was ignored in Serbia itself.

==== Lions from Pionirska Dolina case ====
During the Siege of Sarajevo, Serbian propaganda was trying to justify the siege at any cost. As the result of that effort, Serbian national television showed a report that stated, "Serb children being given as food for lions in Sarajevo Zoo called Pionirska Dolina by Muslim extremists".

==== Kravica and Bratunac killings as triggers for the Srebrenica massacre ====
While the Srebrenica enclave was under siege by the Army of the Republika Srpska, its commander, Naser Orić, led several attacks around the nearby Serbian-held villages, many of which had been Bosnian prior to the war but were overtaken by Serbian forces during the first months of the siege. The operations resulted in many Serb casualties. Orić was later indicted by the ICTY in his trial judgment. It was established that the regular Bosnian troops in Srebrenica were often unable to restrain the large groups of starving civilians that took part in the attacks to get food from Serbian villages. Nonetheless, the attacks were described by some Serbian media as the main trigger for the Serb perpetrated Srebrenica massacre. A television presenter in Pale said that "Srebrenica was liberated from terrorists" and that "the offensive took place after the Muslim side attacked the Serb villages outside the Srebrenica protected zone".

Republika Srpska organizations claim that 3,267 Serbs were killed in Bratunac and Srebrenica from 1992 to 1995 by the Bosniak Army prior to the Srebrenica massacre. Nonetheless, this number could not be independently verified. In 2006, the Research and Documentation Center in Sarajevo (IDC) compiled a list of 119 Serb civilians and 428 Serb soldiers who died in Bratunac during the war. Another revised account by IDC cites 158 Serb civilian fatalities in Srebrenica during the war and 127 in Bratunac.

=== Propaganda as part of the indictment at ICTY ===
==== Propaganda as part of indictment against Milošević ====
Two members of the Federal Security Service (KOG) testified for the prosecution in Milosevic's trial about their involvement in his propaganda campaign. Slobodan Lazarević revealed alleged KOG clandestine activities designed to undermine the peace process, including mining a soccer field, a water tower and the reopened railway between Zagreb and Belgrade. These actions were blamed on Croats. Mustafa Čandić, one of four assistant chiefs of the KOG, described the use of technology to fabricate conversations to make it sound as if Croat authorities were telling Croats in Serbia to leave in order to create an ethnically-pure Croatia. The conversation was broadcast after a Serbian attack on Croatians living in Serbia forced them to flee. He testified to another instance of disinformation involving a television broadcast of corpses, described as Serbian civilians killed by Croats. Čandić testified that he believed they were in fact the bodies of Croats killed by Serbs, but that statement has not been verified. He also corroborated the existence of Operations Opera and Labrador.

=== Bombing of RTS and aftermath ===
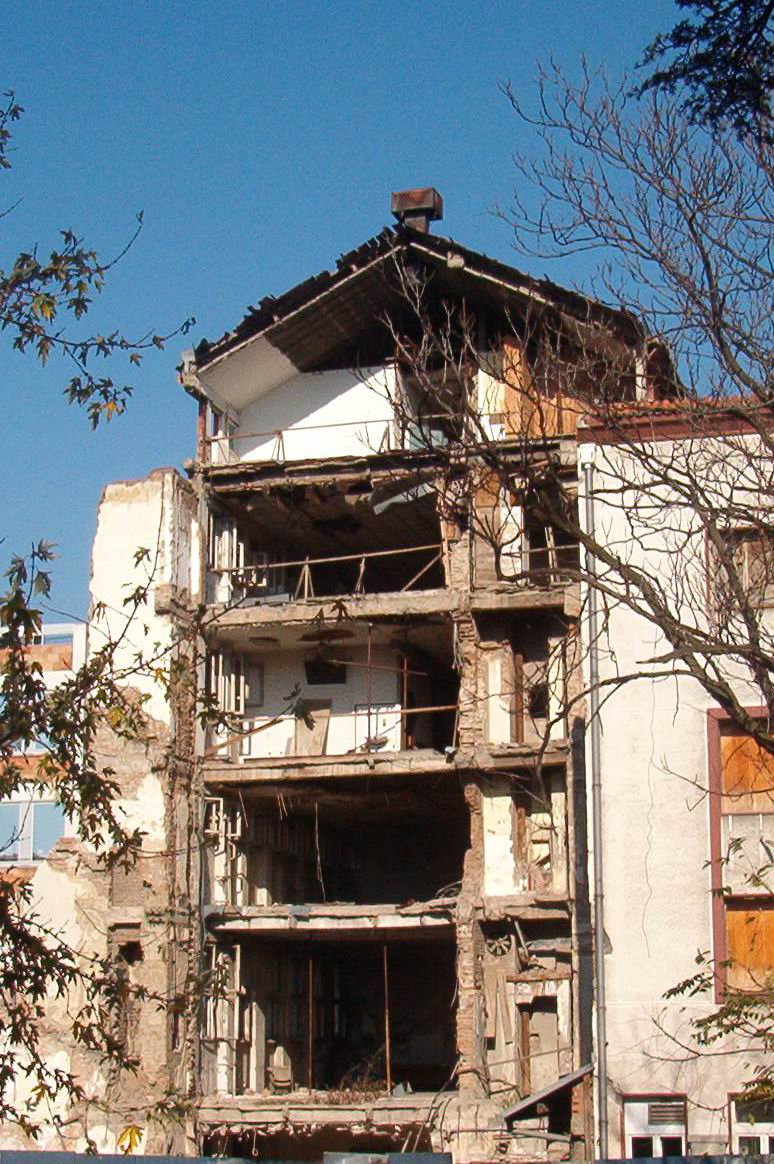
The building of Radio Television of Serbia was destroyed by NATO on 24 April 1999.

During the 1999 NATO bombing of Yugoslavia, the building of Radio Television of Serbia in Belgrade was destroyed by NATO despite a controversy. France opposed the bombing, and Amnesty International and Human Rights Watch condemned it as an attack on a civilian target.

When Milošević's government was overthrown in October 2000, the RTS was a primary target of demonstrators. After attacking the Parliament, the demonstrators headed for the RTS building.

==== RTS apology ====
On 23 May 2011, RTS issued an official apology how its programming had been misused to spread propaganda and discredit political opponents in the 1990s and for its programming having "hurt the feelings, moral integrity and dignity of the citizens of Serbia, humanist-oriented intellectuals, members of the political opposition, critically minded journalists, certain minorities in Serbia, minority religious groups in Serbia, as well as certain neighbouring peoples and states".

=== Resistance ===
A number of independent Serbian media outlets resisted Milošević's influence and control and tried to counterbalance its nationalist rhetoric. They included B92 radio, Studio B Television and Vreme magazine. In May 1992, Vreme published articles on the destruction of cities in Bosnia and Croatia, and in November 1992 described attacks on cultural heritage sites (by both Serb and non-Serb forces). The most notable dissident voice, however, came from the daily Belgrade newspaper Borba. A team of researchers from the University of Ljubljana studied Serbian and Croatian media during the war and found that Borba tried to "maintain a rational attitude" towards the war that included the publishing of comprehensive information and objective reporting on the Croatian government's reactions to individual events, which was lacking in the Croatian media. It was the first newspaper to cover the destruction of five mosques in the city of Bijeljina in March 1993 during the Bosnian War. In the Milošević-controlled press, the editors of Borba were singled out as "traitors". The independent outlets were regularly harassed and struggled to stay afloat.

== Croatian media ==
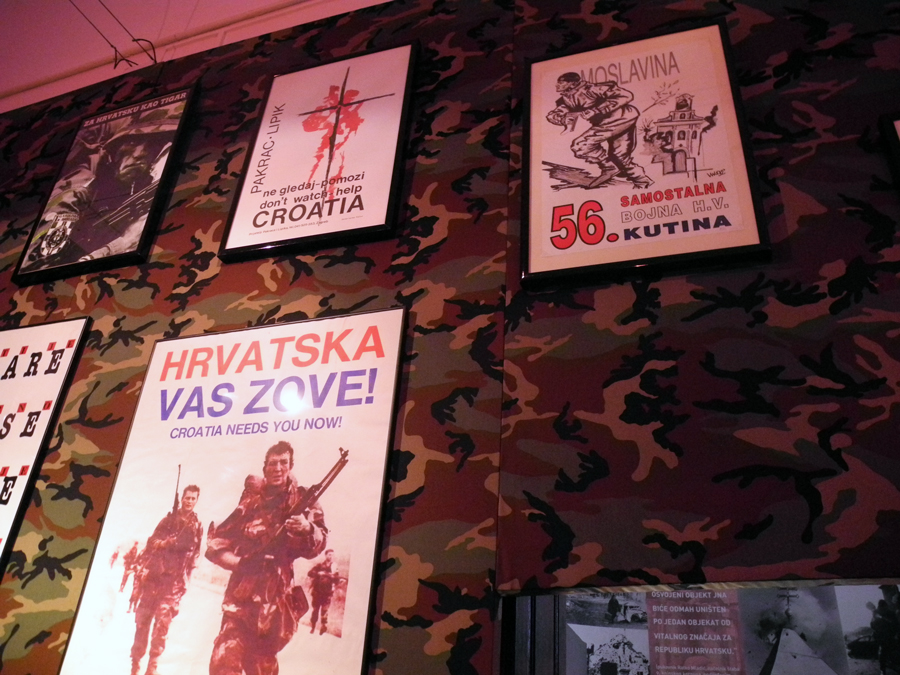
Croatian propaganda posters during the Croatian War of Independence

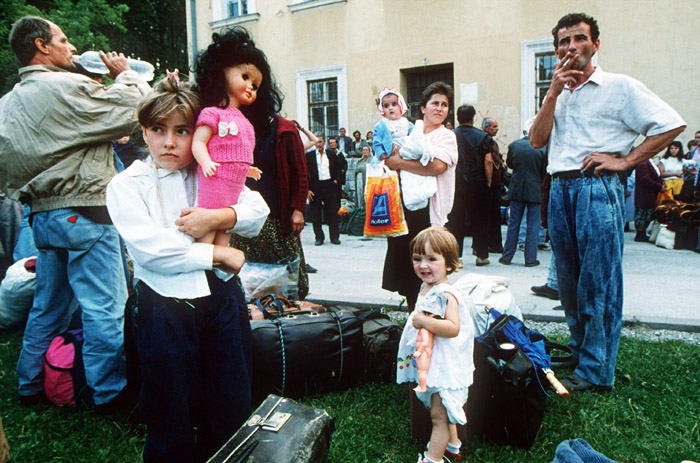
Refugees in Travnik, a town in the Lašva Valley, 1992-1993. Photo by Mikhail Evstafiev

The war in Croatia was the second secessionist conflict in Yugoslavia and followed the conflict in Slovenia. Tudjman and his government portrayed the conflict to the US as a war of democracy versus communism and good against evil. The Croatian ministry of information grew in size and the ruling party, the Croatian Democratic Union (HDZ), strengthened its influence over Croatian television, radio and print media. The Western media was then based in Croatia and so susceptible to being influenced by the Croatian government. In the summer of 1991, Croatia hired Ruder Finn, a public relations firm whose services included communications with US government representatives, as well as the international news media, to bolster the country's public image. The strategy had included mobilising the 2.5 million Croats in the US to lobby their own representatives in Congress. The firm organized trips to Croatia by US representatives and combined the visits with videos of death and destruction. The dominant perspective in Western media and discourse remained that Serbian expansionism, not Croatian secessionism, had caused the conflict. In London, Croatian representatives entered negotiations with lobbying firms, including Hill and Knowlton, and offered 500,000 pounds for the creation of a media campaign to win official recognition and raise the profile of Croatia.

In May 1990, Croatian President Franjo Tuđman and his ruling HDZ began their takeover of Croatian radio and television. To help with the process, Tuđman appointed the longtime film director Antun Vrdoljak, who decried that "it was unacceptable for the Croatian TV to have six and a half Serbs running its evening TV journal" (the "half" was the one with "mixed blood"). The HDZ-dominated Croatian Parliament soon appointed party loyalists to top managerial and editorial positions to the Croatian Radio and Television (HRT). In September 1991, 300 employees at HRT were fired for "security reasons." As it turned out, they had been fired because they were of Serbian ethnicity, married to a Serb, had a father who was a member of the Yugoslav Army (JNA) or were not HDZ-supporters.

As war loomed, television broadcasts from the capital, Zagreb, accused the Yugoslav communist regime of "rubbing in" the Croatia's Ustaše legacy. Croatian media presented Croats as victims of a communist conspiracy that wanted to stigmatize them permanently. At the same time, some Croatian Partisan graves and war monuments were desecrated or destroyed, particularly those dedicated to the victims of Ustaše camps. After the first insurrection by Croatian Serbs in 1990, the Croatian media began to refer to Serbs as "bearded Chetnik hordes", "terrorists and conspirators" and a "people ill inclined to democracy". Serbian President Slobodan Milošević was described as a "Stalinist and Bolshevik", "Stalin's bastard", a "bank robber" and an "authoritarian populist". Meanwhile, the Croatian media portrayed Tuđman as "wise", "dignified", "steady" and "a mature statesman".

After the war had broken out, Croatian propaganda progressively played into a moral superiority of the victims by showing the devastation in cities like Dubrovnik and Vukovar and omitting Serbian villages that were in flames.

The Croats also used propaganda against Serbs and against Bosniaks during the 1992-1994 Croat-Bosniak War, which was part of the larger Bosnian War. In its 1993 report, the OHCHR warned that most of the Croatian television media was under the government control and that the state of the media has a "prevailing climate of national and religious hatred which is often encouraged through misinformation, censorship and indoctrination". During the Croat-Bosniak conflict, the Croatian media called Bosnian Muslims "aggressors". A report by Vjesnik alleging that 35 Croats were hanged near the Catholic church in Zenica on 9 August 1993 was later proven to be false.

During the Bosnian War, Croat forces seized the television broadcasting stations like at Skradno and created their own local radio and television to broadcast propaganda. In the same incident, they seized the public institutions, raised the Croatian flag over public institution buildings and imposed the Croatian dinar as their currency. According to ICTY Trial Chambers in the Blaškić case, Croat authorities created a radio station in Kiseljak to broadcast nationalist propaganda. A similar pattern was applied in Mostar and Gornji Vakuf, where the Croats created a radio station, Radio Uskoplje.

Local propaganda efforts in parts of Bosnia and Herzegovina that were controlled by the Croats were supported by Croatian daily newspapers such as Večernji List and Croatian Radio-Television, especially by the controversial reporters Dijana Čuljak and Smiljko Šagolj, who are still blamed by the families of Bosniak victims in the Vranica Case for inciting the massacre of Bosnian prisoners-of-war in Mostar by broadcasting a report on alleged terrorists, arrested by Croats, who victimized Croat civilians. The bodies of the Bosnian prisoners-of-war were later found in a Goranci mass grave. Croatian Radio-Television presented the Croat attack on Mostar, as a Bosnian Muslim attack on Croats who were aligned with the Serbs.

During the ICTY trials against Croat war leaders, many Croatian journalists who participated as the defence witnesses tried to relativise war crimes committed by Croatian troops against non-Croat civilians (Bosniaks in Bosnia and Herzegovina and Serbs in Croatia). During the trial against General Tihomir Blaškić, who was later convicted of war crimes, Ivica Mlivončić, a Croatian columnist in Slobodna Dalmacija, tried to defend the general by presenting a number of claims in his book Zločin s Pečatom ("Crime with a Seal") about the alleged genocide against Croats (most of then are unproven or false), which was considered by the Trial Chambers as irrelevant for the case. After the conviction, he continued to write in Slobodna Dalmacija against the ICTY by presenting it as the court against Croats, with chauvinistic claims that the ICTY cannot be unbiased because it is financed by Saudi Arabia (i.e. Muslims).

Croatian and Bosnian cinema followed the discourse started in the Hollywood by portraying Serbs and Serbia as conquerors, war criminals, robbers and terrorists as an instrument to raise national consciousness.

Despite Tuđman's control over the media, independent newspapers such as Slobodna Dalmacija and the Feral Tribune lent their publications to critical voices. Journalists from the Feral Tribune were the first to reveal the extent of the damage that the Croatian Defence Council (HVO) had inflicted on Islamic heritage sites during the war in Bosnia in May 1994. Their criticism of Tuđman and his regime resulted in threats against the staff and their families from the public that he encouraged. In July 1994, a 50% tax was levied on the publication, normally reserved for pornographic magazines, but it was later rescinded.

== Bosnian media ==
There were instances of politicians "exaggerating" the toll of casualties and/or rape cases for supposed political gain. For example, a former Prime Minister of Bosnia and Herzegovina, Haris Silajdžić, claimed that from April to December 1992, 60,000 instances of rape against Bosniak women had been committed by Serbs. The Parliamentary Assembly of the Council of Europe estimates the total number to be around 20,000 from all three sides during the war.

In June 1992, Bosnian President Alija Izetbegović signed a contract with the Washington-based Ruder Finn to promote a stronger leadership for the United States in the Balkans. The "Bosnian Crisis Communication Centre" set up by the firm put local Bosnian leaders in contact with Western officials and mass media. It also prepared news articles and war narratives for American outlets such as the New York Times, The Washington Post, USA Today, and the Wall Street Journal. The agency also worked to secure a UN resolution in support of military intervention in Bosnia for "humanitarian reasons".

In a 1993 interview, James Harff, the president of Ruder Finn, lauded his firm's contacts with politicians, human rights organizations, journalists and other members of the media and boasted about its accomplishments, most notably in winning over Jewish public opinion for Croats, Bosniaks and Kosovars following the antisemitic "historical past[s] of Croatia and Bosnia" during World War II. After New York Newsday reported a story on "death camps" in August 1992 set up by Serbs, Ruder Finn contacted major Jewish organizations. The result was more frequent emotive language in the press which evoked the memories of the Holocaust and equation of Serbs with Nazis. Harff remarked that speed was the key in transmitting information as the first message was "the most important" and "subsequent denials [had] no effect" and added that its job was not to verify the information, only to accelerate its distribution for their clients.

== NATO and Western media ==
=== Demonization of Serbs ===
Some scholars and observers, such as Nicholas Cull, David Welch, Noam Chomsky, Michael Parenti and Scott Taylor argue that throughout the wars, the Western media framed the conflict in a way that amounted to demonizing not only Slobodan Milošević but also the Serbian people as a whole. Others reject the idea that Western media was involved in anti-Serb propaganda. The historian Marko Attila Hoare disputed the claims, which he saw as coming from "left revisionists", and emphasized that "demonization of Serbs" actually represented a diversity of opinions on the war and that those on the "Western far left" making such arguments were among other things "cynical and hypocritical in [their] use of both facts and arguments". Publishers Weekly's review of Parenti's book stated, "While other Balkan political and military leaders may also deserve blame, Milošević does not deserve a defense."

The journalist David Binder argues that US policy throughout the 1990s was ruled by a "simplistic dogma that blames one nation, the Serbs, as the origin of evil in the Balkans" and that the "unwritten doctrine was endorsed and spread by the mainstream media". In contrast, Roger Cohen a columnist for The New York Times, stated that narratives asserting the "demonization" of the Serbs were used as a manoeuvre to turn the general view of the Yugoslav Wars on its head by transforming Serbs from aggressors into victims. The journalist Michel Collon wrote that if perpetrators of crimes were of Serbian ethnicity, the Western media would accuse the entire Serb nation ("the Serbs"), instead of using precise terminology like "Serb extremists". Philip Hammond, a professor of media and communications who focuses on the role of the media in post-Cold War conflicts and international interventions, claimed that in reporting on the Yugoslav Wars, the British media resorted to stereotypes of Serbians to report on the war.

Sylvia Hale, commenting on the role of the media in legitimizing wars, stated that Ruder Finn established The Crisis Center, which prepared regular stream of articles and war narratives for American media outlets. She claimed that Ruder Finn was focused only on Serbian prison camps, but Bosnian Muslims and Croats also set up camps for people whom they considered a threat to the territory that they controlled. She also noted that vastly inflating numbers of casualties was another tactic in the mass media propaganda war. According to Herbert N. Foerstel, Ruder Finn's main goal was "painting the Serbs as barbarians". In every communiqué with their contacts, the message was that "Serbs were responsible for all the carnage in the Balkans." The author Florence Levinsohn wrote that Croatia, Bosnia and Kosovo sought to "win the hearts and minds of Americans" through Ruder Finn by advocating for an American intervention in the wars. To do this it was necessary that "Serbs be demonized, that the West sympathize with the plight of the former republics in their heroic struggle".

The American journalist Peter Brook examined 1,500 articles published in 1992 by a number of Western medias and agencies. The ratio of articles that presented a positive image of Serbs to articles that presented an overwhelmingly negative image was 40:1.

=== Kosovo War ===
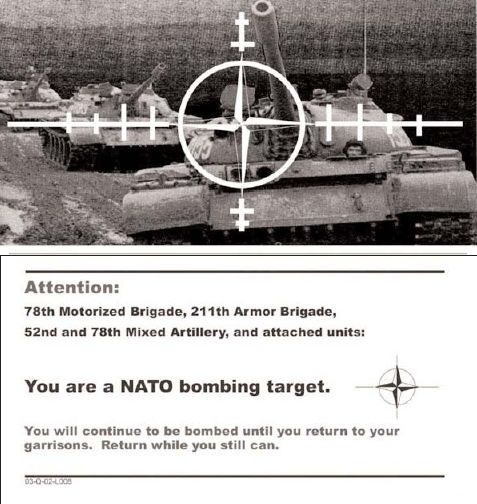
Psychological warfare by NATO

Historians specializing in propaganda, Nicholas Cull, David Holbrook Culbert and David Welch, described the Kosovo War as the "extreme case of the use propaganda by all sides in late 20th century", and also as the first war in which the internet played a significant role in the propaganda campaign. They explained countries in NATO viewing the public support for their actions as "critical areas of vulnerability". The strategy included daily special government press conferences and updates of websites.

During the Kosovo War, the Clinton administration and NATO officials were accused of inflating the number of Kosovar Albanians killed by Serbs to justify US involvement in the conflict. US President Bill Clinton compared the events of Kosovo to The Holocaust and the persecution of Jews during World War II. The administration repeatedly referred to the situation in Kosovo as a genocide. On 16 May 1999, Defense Secretary William Cohen appeared on CBS' Face the Nation and suggested that 100,000 men might have been murdered. Postwar examinations revealed the genocide statements and casualty figures had been greatly exaggerated. The Canadian political scientist Mark Wolfgram said that Western media sources presented the executions in the village of Rogovo, near Gjakova, as the killing of ethnic Albanians but failed to state that most of the killed were Kosovo Liberation Army (KLA) fighters or supporters, as reported by an Organization for Security and Co-operation in Europe (OSCE) investigation. Rudolf Scharping, the German Minister of Defence, described the killings as a massacre of civilians.

Wolfgram stated that the Račak massacre was a proven war crime, but he claimed that there were many problematic parts with the story as reported and as manipulated by the Clinton administration, for example by uncritical ignoring of the fact that the KLA used Račak as base to attack Serbian targets. After the massacre, the Clinton administration launched a "propaganda blitz" to convince the American people that intervention in Yugoslavia was necessary. Public support for intervention among American citizens remained only at about 50%, even after the extensive media attention of Račak, which denoted that war against Yugoslavia would be significantly less popular than previous conflicts and interventions undertaken by the US in its recent history. The accusations of mutilation through decapitation were false but had attracted a lot of media attention as alleged evidence of "Serbian barbarism".

Wolfgram also criticized reporting on the alleged Operation Horseshoe and explained that it was clear that there was co-ordinated action by Milošević's forces, but NATO had tried to make it known that it was reacting to something that had been underway since November 1998. Many scholars, including Sabrina P. Ramet, question the existence of the Operation Horseshoe. Jing Ke showed in his study that The Washington Times and The Washington Post failed or ignored to report some of the crucial issues related to the Kosovo crisis, such as part of the Rambouillet Agreement, cluster-bombing of non-military targets and the bombing of the Radio Television of Serbia. Philip Hammond concluded that British media coverage of the NATO air campaign "encountered familiar problems of news management and propaganda" that were observed in post-Cold War conflict reporting.

== See also ==
- Living Marxism § ITN vs. LM
- Milovan Drecun, journalist from Radio Television of Serbia in the 1990s
- Joint criminal enterprise
- Serbia Strong, Serb nationalist propaganda music video from the Bosnian War

== Sources ==
- EXPERT REPORT OF RENAUD DE LA BROSSE "Political Propaganda and the Plan to Create 'A State For All Serbs:' Consequences of using media for ultra-nationalist ends" in five parts 1 2 3 4 5
- BIRN Bosnian Institute, Analysis: Media Serving the War, Aida Alić, 20 July 2007
- Milosevic's Propaganda War, by Judith Armatta, Institute of War and Peace Reporting, 27 February 2003
- Goodman, Geoffrey (June 1999). "Too many truths". British Journalism Review. 10 (2): 3–6. doi:10.1177/095647489901000201. S2CID 144617752.
