= National Security Council (Serbia) =

National Security Council of the Republic of Serbia
- Савет за националну безбедност Републике Србије
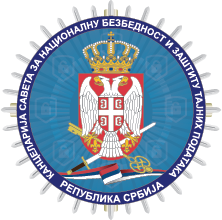
- Emblem of the Office of the National Security Council

Agency overview
- Formed: 2007
- Jurisdiction: Serbia
- Agency executive: President of the Republic (as Chairman of the National Security Council); Minister of Defence (as Secretary of the National Security Council)

National Security Council of the Republic of Serbia (Serbian: Савет за националну безбедност Републике Србије, romanized: Savet za nacionalnu bezbednost Republike Srbije) is the state body of Serbia which considers issues of importance for national security and directs the works of the security services.

== History ==
Before the establishment of the National Security Council, there were several unsuccessful attempts to form a body which could bring together key decision-makers in the security sector. The State Security Council eas established by a decree of the government of Zoran Đinđić, but it did not last long. The first government of Vojislav Koštunica established such a council in 2006 in order to establish better coordination of the work of the security and intelligence agencies, but this council was never convened.

The term National Security Council was first used in 2006 when the Government of Serbia decided to form a council, which was formally established in 2007, following the adoption of the Law on the Fundamentals of Security Services.

== Composition ==
The National Security Council is composed of:

1. President of the Republic (chairman)
2. Prime Minister
3. Minister of Defence
4. Minister of Internal Affairs
5. Minister of Justice
6. Director of the Security and Intelligence Agency
7. Director of the Military Security Agency
8. Director of the Military Intelligence Agency
9. Secretary of the National Security Council

Sessions of the council are convened by the President of the Republic, at least once every three months, and more often if necessary. The agenda is determined by the president together with the prime minister. If the president is prevented and unable to chair, the prime minister takes office.

The President of the Republic, as the chairman, may, on his own initiative, or on the initiative of one of the members, invite to a meeting the heads of state bodies and institutions, or some other persons who are not members of the council. All conclusions and other acts that are passed are signed personally by the President of the Republic.

== Organization ==
=== Secretary ===
The Secretary of the National Security Council participates in the work of the council, but has no right to decide. Its main function is to ensure the implementation of all Council conclusions. The President of the Republic appoints and dismisses the Secretary of the National Security Council.

=== Office ===
The Office of the National Security Council performs professional and administrative tasks for the needs of the council, and in particular:

- Affairs related to convening and preparing the sessions of the Council
- professional work related to monitoring the implementation of the guidelines and conclusions of the Council
- administrative and technical support to the Coordination Bureau
- keeping and making available to the members of the Council reports and other acts of the Council

== Missions ==
Missions of the council are confined to the coordination of the elements of the security sector - the armed forces, the police and the security and intelligence agencies. The following are the roles of the National Security Council:

- It takes care of national security by addressing security issues
- Coordinates the work of state bodies that make up the security sector and considers measures to improve national security
- Directs and coordinates the work of security services by reviewing intelligence and security assessments and making conclusions regarding the work of security services and the Bureau for Coordination of Security and Intelligence Agencies
- Determines priorities and ways of protection and directs the realization of national interests that are carried out by performing intelligence and security activities
- Directs and coordinates the work of security services
- Gives the Government an opinion on the budget proposals of the security services, on the proposals of the annual and medium-term work plans of the security services, as well as on the proposal for the appointment and dismissal of the heads of the security services
- Takes care of the harmonized application of regulations and standards for the protection of personal data, as well as other regulations that protect human rights that may be endangered by the exchange of information or other operational activities

== See also ==
- National security of Serbia
