= National security of Serbia =

National security of Serbia relates to the issues of Serbian national security.

== Security and intelligence system ==
The National Security Council considers issues of importance for national security and coordinates the work of the security and intelligence services.

There are three security and intelligence agencies in Serbia, one civilian and two military. The Security and Intelligence Agency, is a civil security and intelligence agency, responsible for collecting, reporting and disseminating intelligence, and conducting counterintelligence in the interest of national security. Under the auspices of the Ministry of Defence, there are the Military Security Agency and Military Intelligence Agency.

== Status of Kosovo ==
The political status of Kosovo is the subject of a long-running political and territorial dispute between the Serbian government and the Government of Kosovo, stemming from the breakup of Yugoslavia and the ensuing Kosovo War. In 1999, the administration of the Autonomous Province of Kosovo and Metohija was handed on an interim basis to the United Nations under the terms of UNSCR 1244 which ended the Kosovo conflict of that year. That resolution reaffirmed the territorial integrity of Serbia over Kosovo but required the UN administration to promote the establishment of 'substantial autonomy and self-government' for Kosovo pending a 'final settlement' for negotiation between the parties.

The UN-sponsored talks began in 2006, and though no agreement was reached between the parties, a proposal from UN Special Envoy Martti Ahtisaari was presented in 2007 which recommended 'supervised independence' for the province. After many weeks of discussions at the UN in New York, the United States, United Kingdom and other European members of the United Nations Security Council formally 'discarded' a draft resolution backing Ahtisaari's proposal, as they had failed to secure Russian backing.

On 17 February 2008, representatives of the people of Kosovo, acting outside the Provisional Institutions of Self-Government framework established by the UN governance mission, issued a declaration of independence establishing the Republic of Kosovo. The International Court of Justice ruled that the declaration did not violate international law and argued that the signatory authors represented the broad will of the People of Kosovo, rather than the Assembly of Kosovo under the umbrella of UN resolution 1244.

== Relations with NATO ==
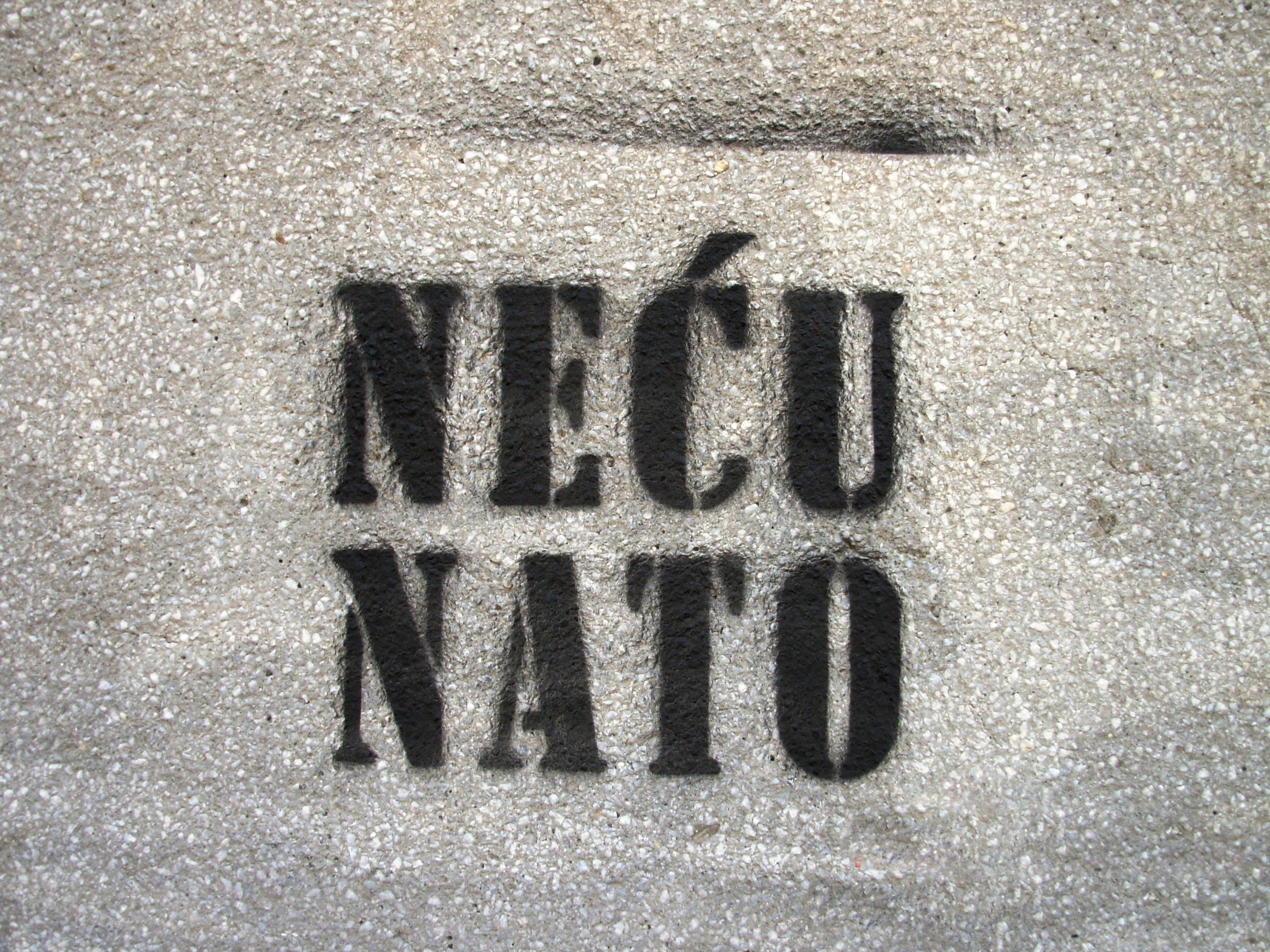
NEĆU NATO (I do not want NATO), anti-NATO graffiti in Belgrade

Serbia is a militarily neutral country with no intentions of joining NATO.

The NATO intervention in Bosnia and Herzegovina in 1994–95 and the NATO bombing of Yugoslavia in 1999 resulted in strained relations between Serbia and NATO. Relations were further strained following Kosovo's declaration of independence in 2008 while a protectorate of the United Nations with security support from NATO. However, Serbia was invited and joined the Partnership for Peace programme during the 2006 Riga summit and in 2008 was invited to enter the intensified dialogue programme whenever the country is ready.

National Assembly of Serbia passed a resolution in 2007 which declared country's military neutrality until such time as a referendum holding on the issue. In 2008, Serbian Defence Minister Dragan Šutanovac signed the Information Exchange Agreement with NATO, one of the prerequisites for fuller membership in the Partnership for Peace programme. In 2011 Serbia's request for an IPAP was approved by NATO, and Serbia submitted a draft IPAP in 2013 with agreement finalized in 2015.

Following the start of the Russian invasion of Ukraine, several neutral states reconsidered their alignment and applied for NATO membership. However, Serbian President Aleksandar Vučić, reiterated that Serbia was not interested in NATO membership. The minor Serbian Renewal Movement, which has two seats in the National Assembly, remain the only parliamentary party in favor of NATO membership.

A 2022 poll found that only 10 percent of those polled supported country's NATO membership while 82 percent were opposed.

== See also ==
- National Security Council
- Foreign relations of Serbia
