= Serbian National Council of Kosovo and Metohija =

- Formation: 1999 (first time); 2023 (second time)
- Dissolved: 2013 (first time)
- Location: Kosovo
- Official language: Serbian
- President: Momir Stojanović

Serbian National Council of Kosovo and Metohija (abbreviated as SNC Kosovo and Metohija, Serbian: Srpsko nacionalno Veće Kosova i Metohije, SNV KiM) is an elected political and coordinating body acting as a representative of Serbs of Kosovo.

== History ==
=== North Kosovo barricades ===
Tensions flared over the issue of controlling Kosovo-Serbia checkpoints. From Kosovo's independence in 2008 until mid-July, the two main border posts in the north were controlled by EULEX. But on July 25, the Republic of Kosovo deployed special police to these two checkpoints to enforce a recent trade ban on goods entering from Serbia proper. Kosovo Serbs then erected barricades on various roads, preventing access to the Jarinje and Brnjak border posts. KFOR has since requested the removal of the barricades. President of the council, Nebojsa Jovic, said Serbs would keep the barricades and were ready to protect them with their lives: "If the barricades are taken down, EULEX and KFOR will have to pass through us, We don’t want to threaten anyone. But the moment they march on the barricades, even if they use tanks, they will have to run over us first [...] If we find ourselves in a life threatening situation, then of course we will have to defend ourselves with other means, but I hope this will never happen."

The four municipalities of North Kosovo are under the de facto control of Serbia, which finances all the main institutions.

The President of the council, Nebojša Jović, said that 50,000 Serbs living in North Kosovo want the territory to become part of Serbia and are ready to die for the cause. He stressed that Serbs would never accept the independence proclamation by Republic of Kosovo: "They cannot force us to be part of the independent Kosovo. This will never happen, There are two options. The first is that we are allowed to live inside Serbia, separated from independent Kosovo. The second is that someone expels us from here, which believe me, is hard to achieve. Deporting 50,000 people looks like a big risk." Commenting on EU Enlargement Commissioner Stefan Fule's urging of Belgrade to improve its relation with Pristina in order to begin EU accession talk, Jovic said that Fule "means absolutely nothing compared with Resolution 1244. This resolution is stronger than Stefan Fule, and it is more powerful than the German Chancellor [Angela Merkel] and other statesmen." He also said "What's happening in the north is a private war of [Kosovo Prime Minister] Hashim Thaci," and "It’s not a war between the Albanian and Serbian nation [...] No one can force us love each other, The Albanians don't love us and I don’t like them, but don’t hate them either" stressing that multi-ethnic institutions could not function in Kosovo. He added: "It’s a fact that in the past we [Serbs] tried through violence and war to achieve our goals, but we failed. That was the case pre-1999 and afterwards. Now is the time to talk to each other. Dialogue and an agreement should be based upon reality [on the ground] and on the readiness of both sides to compromise".

The EULEX has been allowed free movement into North Kosovo on the conditions that they do not transport Kosovo Albanian customs officers. Zvečan Deputy Mayor Dragiša Milović explained that the barricades would remain as long as "Albanian customs officers are at the Brnjak and Jarinje administrative crossings".

=== North Kosovo referendum ===
The referendum was announced on December 25, 2011, by Kosovska Mitrovica Mayor Krstimir Pantić, after a joint decision by the four municipalities in North Kosovo.

The Serb National Council fully supported the referendum. Velić, answering to newspapers in Kosovska Mitrovica, said that the referendum showed, in a democratic manner, the "true will" of the Serb people, in which state and with which institutes the people want to live with. He also sought for the municipalities to the south of Ibar to organize a referendum with the same question: "Do you want Kosovan institutions in this region" ("Da li želite kosovske institucije na ovom području?").

The result saw 99.74% of voters reject the writ of the Republic of Kosovo's institutions. The Republic of Kosovo adopted a resolution declaring the referendum an attack on Kosovo's sovereignty. The poll was rejected by the governments of both Serbia and Kosovo.

=== Reactivation in 2023 ===
The SNV was reactivated at a conference in Belgrade in November 2023. The main organizer of the event was Momčilo Trajković, who highlighted the SNV's opposition to Aleksandar Vučić's administration and to the "normalization" of relations between Belgrade and Priština under the Ohrid Agreement. Trajković contended that the Vučić administration was a "puppet" of international powers that were attempting to make Kosovo an independent state without a Serb population. The conference elected Nenad Kojić as the SNV's new leader.

Kojić was subsequently dismissed amid acrimony in February 2024, and Momir Stojanović was chosen as his replacement.

== Serbian National Council of North Kosovo and Metohija ==
Serbian National Council of North Kosovo and Metohija (Српско национално веће северног КиМ) was founded in June 1999, officially, on December 19, 1999, in Leposavić. North Kosovo was administrated by the Serb National Council of North Kosovo. The first president was Oliver Ivanović, who served until 6 June 2001. It was later led by Dr. Milan Ivanović. The seat of the National Council is in Mitrovica.

North Kosovo is joined with the remaining Serb enclaves in the Association of Serb Municipalities (Zajednica srpskih opština), founded in February 2003 in Mitrovica, the president of which was Marko Jakšić.

== Presidents ==
- Dragan Velić (1999)
- Nebojša Jović (2011)
- Dragan Velić (2012–13)
- Nenad Kojić (2023–24)
- Momir Stojanović (2024–)

== See also ==
- Assembly of the Community of Municipalities of the Autonomous Province of Kosovo and Metohija
