= Security Administration =

Security Administration may refer to:

- Transportation Security Administration
- State Security Administration, intelligence agency of SFR Yugoslavia
- Security Administration (FR Yugoslavia), military intelligence agency of FR Yugoslavia
