= Momir Stojanović =

Serbian politician (born 1958)

- Момир Стојановић

President of the Serb National Council of Kosovo and Metohija
- Incumbent
- Assumed office 27 February 2024
- Preceded by: Nenad Kojić

Member of the National Assembly of the Republic of Serbia
- In office 31 May 2012 – 3 June 2016

Director of the Military Security Agency of Serbia and Montenegro
- In office 1 January 2004 – 27 May 2004
- Preceded by: position established
- Succeeded by: Svetko Kovač

Director of the Military Security Service of Serbia and Montenegro
- In office 7 April 2003 – 31 December 2003
- Preceded by: Aco Tomić
- Succeeded by: position eliminated

Personal details
- Party: SRS (2007); SPS (2007–09); SNS (2010–16) "Honestly for Niš" (2016–20)

Military service
- Allegiance: SFR Yugoslavia; FR Yugoslavia; Serbia and Montenegro
- Branch/service: Yugoslav People's Army; Yugoslav Army; Armed Forces of Serbia and Montenegro
- Years of service: ?–2005
- Rank: Major General
- Unit: Priština Corps
- Battles/wars: Kosovo War

Momir Stojanović (Serbian Cyrillic: Момир Стојановић; born 12 October 1958) is a Serbian politician and retired general. He was the head of military intelligence for Serbia and Montenegro in 2003–04 and a member of the Serbian parliament from 2012 to 2016. Stojanović has at different times been a member of the Serbian Radical Party (SRS), the Socialist Party of Serbia (SPS), and the Serbian Progressive Party (SNS). He is now the leader of the Serb National Council of Kosovo and Metohija (SNV).

At different times in his career, Stojanović has been accused of war crimes in the 1998–99 Kosovo War. He has never faced trial in these matters and has consistently rejected the accusations as false.

== Early life ==
Stojanović was born to a Kosovo Serb family in Đakovica, in what was then the Autonomous Region of Kosovo and Metohija in the People's Republic of Serbia, Federal People's Republic of Yugoslavia. He entered the Yugoslav People's Army (JNA) in the time of the Socialist Federal Republic of Yugoslavia and served in the army's anti-aircraft missile defence units.

== Military career ==
=== Federal Republic of Yugoslavia (1992–2003) ===
The Federal Republic of Yugoslavia, comprising the republics of Serbia and Montenegro, was constituted in April 1992. Its military was known simply as the Yugoslav Army (VJ). Stojanović was appointed as deputy head of security for the VJ's Priština Corps in 1993 and was promoted to head of security in 1996, serving in this capacity until 1999.

In May 1999, during the NATO bombing of Yugoslavia, Stojanović was placed on a European Union (EU) travel ban. Serbia lost effective control over most of Kosovo in the aftermath of the 1998–99 conflict, and virtually all of Đakovica's formerly sizeable Serb population fled the province.

Reflecting on his experiences from the Kosovo War in a March 2010 interview, Stojanović described the crimes committed by Serb forces as "shameful for the Serb people" but also as isolated and not planned or systemic. By contrast, he described the actions of Germany, the United States of America, and other NATO countries as "a planned and systemic crime, a crime against peace," with the intent of using the Kosovo Liberation Army (KLA) to separate Kosovo from Serbia.

He was appointed as head of the operational department of the Priština Corps Command on 15 May 2002.

=== Serbia and Montenegro (2003–06) ===
The Federal Republic of Yugoslavia was reconstituted as the State Union of Serbia and Montenegro in February 2003.

On 25 March 2003, the Serbia and Montenegro Supreme Defence Council appointed Stojanović as head of the country's Military Security Service (VSB), in which capacity he was responsible to the general staff of the Armed Forces of Serbia and Montenegro. The appointment came into effect on 7 April. Following his appointment, human rights activist Nataša Kandić issued a public letter accusing Stojanović of breaching the Geneva Convention and domestic laws on the protection of citizens during the Kosovo War. He rejected the accusations, saying, "I have never in my military career breached the Geneva Convention or the domestic norms on the protection of civilians in times of armed conflict." He added that Kandić's letter erroneously identified him as head of operations for the Priština Corps during the Kosovo War and accused him of issuing orders for which he was not and could not have been responsible.

Stojanović announced in December 2003 that Serbia and Montenegro's VSB would soon be replaced by a new entity called the Military Security Agency (VBA), falling under the authority of the civilian ministry of defence. The new organization was established on 1 January 2004 with Stojanović in the role of director; he indicated that the agency's main goal would be the fight against domestic and international terrorism and organized crime. The agency was criticized by representatives of the Montenegrin government, including retired general Blagoje Grahovac, who raised objections concerning the manner of its creation.

Stojanović made a number of controversial statements in early 2004. He claimed that representatives of al-Qaeda were active in Kosovo, northern Albania, and the predominantly Albanian areas of western Macedonia, and that other Islamist extremist organizations of a Wahhabist orientation had become active in Serbia and Montenegro, including in the Sandžak and the northern part of Montenegro. He said that the strategic goal of these extremist groups was to create an independent Muslim state in the Balkans, adding that agents from Serbia and Montenegro had infiltrated the "leadership of the separatist movement" and the "leadership of the terrorist organizations" in Kosovo. He later said that the VBA was monitoring these groups with regard to their involvement in paramilitary formation and the illegal arms trade and their actions toward the Kosovo Serb community, and that the VBA's oversight of these groups was not unusual in the broader framework of intelligence gathering.

Stojanović's claims were widely criticized. The Albanian and Macedonian governments rejected the suggestion that al-Qaeda was active in their territories, and the North Atlantic Treaty Organization (NATO) denied that al-Qaeda had a presence in Kosovo. (NATO officials also dismissed Stojanović's claims about the infiltration of Kosovo paramilitary groups.) The Sandžak Democratic Party (SDP) called on Stojanović to substantiate his claims about extremist groups in their area, and party leader Rasim Ljajić accused Stojanović of "sull[ying] the reputation of an entire region" by not providing specific information about the alleged terrorist groups. Perhaps the most damaging criticism, however, came from Montenegrin officials. Blagoje Grahovac described Stojanović's claims about Islamist extremist infiltration as "a scandal of international proportions," and Montenegrin assembly president Ranko Krivokapić said that he would seek Stojanović's dismissal from office.

Stojanović was, in fact, dismissed from office on 27 May 2004. Serbia and Montenegro president Svetozar Marović indicated that he had been fired for making unauthorized statements about agents in Kosovo. He was subsequently promoted to the rank of major-general and reassigned as the main commander of the army's Niš Corps. He was mandated to retire from the military in 2005. Eight years later, he won a lawsuit against the state for illegal retirement.

The federal state of Serbia and Montenegro ceased to exist in June 2006, when Montenegro declared independence.

== Politician ==
=== Socialist Party of Serbia ===
Stojanović entered political life after leaving the military. He initially joined the far-right Serbian Radical Party (SRS) in 2007, though he left the party later in the year to join the Socialist Party of Serbia (SPS).

In October 2007, he charged that the Albanian National Army paramilitary organization was active in Kosovo, Montenegro, western Macedonia, and Albania. He also said that Albanian paramilitaries were planning for a possible attack on the predominantly Serb community of northern Kosovska Mitrovica in the event that Kosovo did not attain independence via diplomatic means. (The Priština authorities later unilaterally declared independence as the Republic of Kosovo in February 2008, a decision that is recognized by about half of the countries of world, not recognized by the other half, and rejected as illegal by the Serbian government.)

Stojanović received the second position (after former mayor Mile Ilić) on the SPS's electoral list for Niš in the 2008 Serbian local elections and was given a mandate in the city assembly after the list won seven out of sixty-one seats. The election did not produce a clear winner, but the SPS ultimately joined a coalition government with the Democratic Party (DS) and G17 Plus, and Stojanović served as a supporter of the administration. He briefly led the SPS group in the city assembly. His first term in elected office was ultimately brief, however; he resigned his seat in early 2009 against the backdrop of divisions in the party.

=== Serbian Progressive Party ===
Stojanović joined the Serbian Progressive Party in 2010. He was given the sixty-fifth position on the party's Let's Get Serbia Moving coalition list in the 2012 Serbian parliamentary election and was elected when the list won seventy-three mandates. The Progressives and Socialists formed a coalition government after the election, and Stojanović served as part of its parliamentary majority. In his first term, he was a member of the committee on defence and internal affairs and the committee on Kosovo and Metohija, the leader of Serbia's parliamentary friendship group with Tunisia, and a member of the friendship groups Austria, Belarus, Ireland, Luxembourg, Mexico, Russia, and Turkmenistan. During this time, he urged passage of a law to ban the participation of Serbian nationals as volunteers or mercenaries in international conflicts.

He also appeared in the fourth position on the SNS's list for Niš in the 2012 Serbian local elections, which took place concurrently with the parliamentary vote, and was re-elected to the city assembly when the list won seventeen mandates. He served for the term that followed. As at the republic level, the Progressives and Socialists formed a new administration in Niš, and Stojanović was part of its assembly majority.

In late 2013, Stojanović was one of two candidates nominated for director of Serbia's Security Intelligence Agency (BIA). He was ultimately not selected for the position.

He was promoted to the twenty-sixth position on the SNS list in the 2014 Serbian parliamentary election and was re-elected when the list won a landslide victory with 158 out of 250 mandates. He became president of the security services control committee after the election and in this capacity encouraged the reform and rationalization of Serbia's intelligence services, with new integrated agencies for intelligence, counter-intelligence, and the fight against organized crime. In May 2015, he said that Serbia's main security threat was the realization of the "Greater Albania" project by Albanian irredentists. He also said that Serbia should not, on security grounds, run the risk of losing territory in southern Central Serbia (i.e., in Preševo and the surrounding area) in the context of defending its interests in the north of Kosovo.

In his second parliamentary term, Stojanović was also a member of the defence and internal affairs committee and the committee on Kosovo and Metohija, a member of Serbia's delegation to the parliamentary assembly of the Collective Security Treaty Organization, the leader of Serbia's parliamentary friendship group with Mexico, and a member of the friendship groups with Belarus, Brazil, Cuba, Malta, Russia, Slovenia, and Tunisia.

In February 2015, Stojanović was placed on an Interpol red notice on the charge of war crimes during the Kosovo War at the request of the European Union Rule of Law Mission in Kosovo (EULEX), which in turn acted at the instigation of the Basic Court in Gjakova [Đakovica]. Stojanović responded that the charge was obviously political, made in retaliation against a United Nations decision to form a court to adjudicate war crimes by the Kosovo Liberation Army (KLA). He added that he was innocent of the charge and that it was inappropriate for a municipal court to have initiated the action. He later described the charge against him as "totally ridiculous" and said, "in Kosovo today it is possible to bribe any false witness to testify against any member of the Serbian army or police."

=== "Honestly for Niš" ===
Stojanović was not a candidate in the 2016 parliamentary election. Citing differences with the local SNS leadership, he contested the 2016 local elections at the head of an independent list called Honestly for Niš list and was re-elected to the city assembly when the list won three mandates. He formally left the SNS later in the year.

Stojanović brought the Honestly for Niš movement into an alliance with New Serbia (NS) and the People's Freedom Movement (NSP), collectively known as the People's Blok, in November 2019. He appeared in the second position on the alliance's list in the 2020 Serbian parliamentary election and was not re-elected when the list fell below the electoral threshold. He also led the People's Blok list in Niš for the concurrent 2020 local elections; this list also fell below the threshold, and his tenure in the city assembly ended that year.

Stojanović remained a frequent commentator on security issues in the Serbian media during these years. In 2019, he said that Serbia's approach to surveillance and data harvesting was chaotic and in need of reform.

=== Serb National Council of Kosovo and Metohija ===
In late 2023, Stojanović became a member of the reactivated Serb National Council of Kosovo and Metohija (SNV). He was appointed as the council's president in February 2024, replacing Nenad Kojić. The council is a rival within the Kosovo Serb community to the Serb List, which is closely linked with Serbia's SNS-led government.

Stojanović discussed various issues relating to the status of Kosovo in a May 2024 interview. He reiterated his opposition to any "normalization" of relations between Belgrade and Priština and said that the proposed Community of Serb Municipalities was not an acceptable solution for the status of Kosovo Serb community. He supported direct dialogue between the parties but said the process should be shifted from Brussels to the United Nations. Stojanović said he was in favour of a referendum for the final status of Kosovo, adding that the Serbian media would first need to be freed to allow voters to properly understand the situation. He added that, while conflict should be avoided, Serbia should make clear to the Priština authorities and the international authorities that it will protect the Kosovo Serb community if the community's safety is threatened.

In an October 2024 interview with Danas, Stojanović said that joining the SNS was the greatest mistake of his life, as the party had undermined Serbia's institutions and robbed the country of democracy and freedom during its time in power. While he credited the SNS's first leader Tomislav Nikolić with initially appointing competent people to oversee the party's regional bodies, he accused Nikolić's successor Aleksandar Vučić of appointing "extremely low-quality people, based on the principle of loyalty," resulting in the entire SNS organization being dominated by "servile, incompetent and blindly loyal cadres." He added that crime and corruption had become worse in Serbia under SNS.
