= Security and Intelligence Agency (Serbia) =

National security and intelligence agency of Serbia

- Безбедносно-информативна агенција
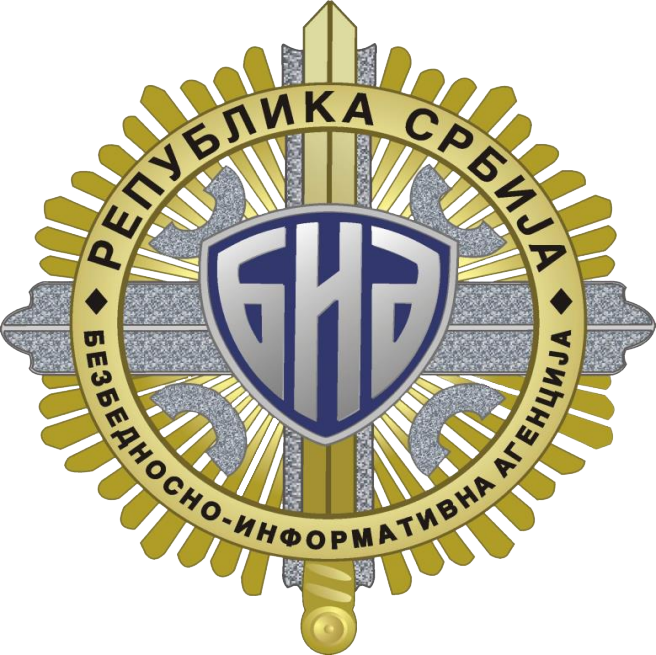
- Emblem of the Security and Intelligence Agency

Agency overview
- Formed: 1899; 127 years ago (current form since 2002)
- Preceding agency: State Security Directorate
- Jurisdiction: Serbia
- Headquarters: Belgrade, Serbia
- Employees: 1,953
- Annual budget: 9.67 billion RSD (€83.5 million) (2026)
- Agency executive: Vladimir Orlić, Director
- Website: bia.gov.rs

The Security and Intelligence Agency (Serbian: Безбедносно-информативна агенција, romanized: Bezbednosno-informativna agencija; abbr. БИА / BIA) is a national security and intelligence agency of Serbia. The agency is responsible for collecting, reporting and disseminating intelligence, and conducting counterintelligence in the interest of Serbia's national security.

== History ==
=== 19th century ===
During the First Serbian Uprising (1804–1813) the civil security and intelligence work was not organized in a separate institution, but was carried out within the military-administrative service of the Revolutionary Serbia. The suppression of espionage conducted by Ottoman Empire and other countries (Habsburg Empire, Russian Empire and at one point in time France as well) was very challenging for military and police authorities of the revolutionary state. Revolutionary authorities targeted infiltrated Ottoman spies and Serbs who provided information to Ottomans.

In 1808 the Governing Council of Revolutionary Serbia issued order to preventively banish from Belgrade and other Serbian cities all individuals that are potentially involved in espionage for the enemy purposes, while police and judicial authorities "were to pay special attention to malevolent people, outlaws, spies and similar". The founding of Ministry of Internal Affairs in 1811 had great significance for the development of security and intelligence functions, since the Ministry of Internal Affairs was, among other missions, in charge of the civil security and intelligence work.

During the rule of Prince Miloš Obrenović great attention was devoted to the organization of security and intelligence activities. The security and intelligence authorities were engaged in secret procurement of weaponry and war equipment from abroad, protection from top secret disclosure, gathering of political and diplomatic notifications, revealing of misinformation on Serbia and its Prince, as well as in channeling of foreign political views towards Prince's policy.

Following the 1878 Congress of Berlin, Serbia became an independent country. King Milan Obrenović implemented reforms in 1882 related to the security and intelligence institutions.

=== Department for Secret Police Work and Police Department ===
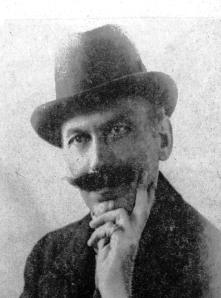
Milorad Vujičić, head of the Police Department (1909–1916)

The civil security and intelligence work has been institutionalized for the first time by 1899 Law on amendments of the Organization of the Central State Administration. Law stipulated establishment of the Department for Secret Police Work (Odeljenje za poverljive policijske poslove) within the Ministry of Internal Affairs, with field of work encompassing intelligence and counterintelligence activities, suppression of anti-state propaganda and outlaw activities, suppression of terrorism. In terms of organization, the secret polices of France and Austria-Hungary served as role models for the Department for Secret Police Work. Jovan Milovanović was named the first head of the department. Apart from the Head of department, the department had secretary and lower ranking officials, as well as an independent archive that stored "all the acts of confidential nature under the special surveillance and care of the Head of Department".

In accordance with the King Aleksandar Obrenović's 1900 Decree, the Department for Secret Police Work was merged into Police Department (Policijsko odeljenje) of the Ministry of Internal Affairs.

=== Department for Public Security and Department for State Protection ===
After the end of World War I and formation of a new state, the Kingdom of Serbs, Croats and Slovenes, short-lived Department for Public Security (Odeljenje za javnu bezbednost) of the Ministry of Internal Affairs was in charge of performing civil security and intelligence work. It was succeeded by the Department for State Protection (Odeljenje za državnu zaštitu) of the Ministry of Internal Affairs, established in 1920, with task to conduct intelligence and counter-intelligence work, control, security and keeping of records on foreigners, dealing with immigrant issues and repatriation, suppression of anti-state propaganda, control of foreign military defectors, monitoring and control of associations, various gatherings and manifestations and other issues on which a proper record was kept. Furthermore, the department was in charge of drafting new bills with aim to protect the state.

After introduction of 6 January Dictatorship in 1929 by King Alexander I and subsequent change of the name of the country to the Kingdom of Yugoslavia, a series of laws and regulations on state administration were enacted. According to the 1929 Law on Internal Administration, the Department for State Protection was divided into two sections (First Section – for suppressing internal anti-state and destructive propaganda and conducting actions along with the intelligence service; Second Section – for suppressing external anti-state propaganda and conducting actions along with the intelligence service) and three subsections (Subsection for police supervision of foreigners and passenger traffic, Administrative Subsection and Subsection for the Press).

=== World War II ===
Upon the invasion of Yugoslavia and signing of capitulation on 17 April 1941, the Ministry of Internal Affairs of the Kingdom of Yugoslavia continued to act within the Yugoslav government-in-exile. Intelligence service of the government-in-exile continued its work within diplomatic missions in allied and neutral countries. The work was primarily oriented towards maintaining relations with homeland and providing financial help to the Chetnik Detachments of the Yugoslav Army, as well as conducting intelligence activities directed to the diplomatic mission of the self-proclaimed Independent State of Croatia in Madrid.

From the very beginning of World War II and establishment of Yugoslav Partisans, committees of the People's Liberation were set up as governing bodies in liberated territories and included bodies in charge of order and security. In September 1941, first Partisan intelligence and counter-intelligence services were established, while in October 1941 there were first intelligence officers in partisan headquarters appointed. In September 1943, the Department for People's Protection (Odeljenje za zaštitu naroda), better known as OZNA, was established within the Anti-Fascist Council for the National Liberation of Yugoslavia as well as within Partisan units with task to unite intelligence and counter-intelligence work and set up an intelligence service.

=== Department for Protection of the People (OZNA) ===
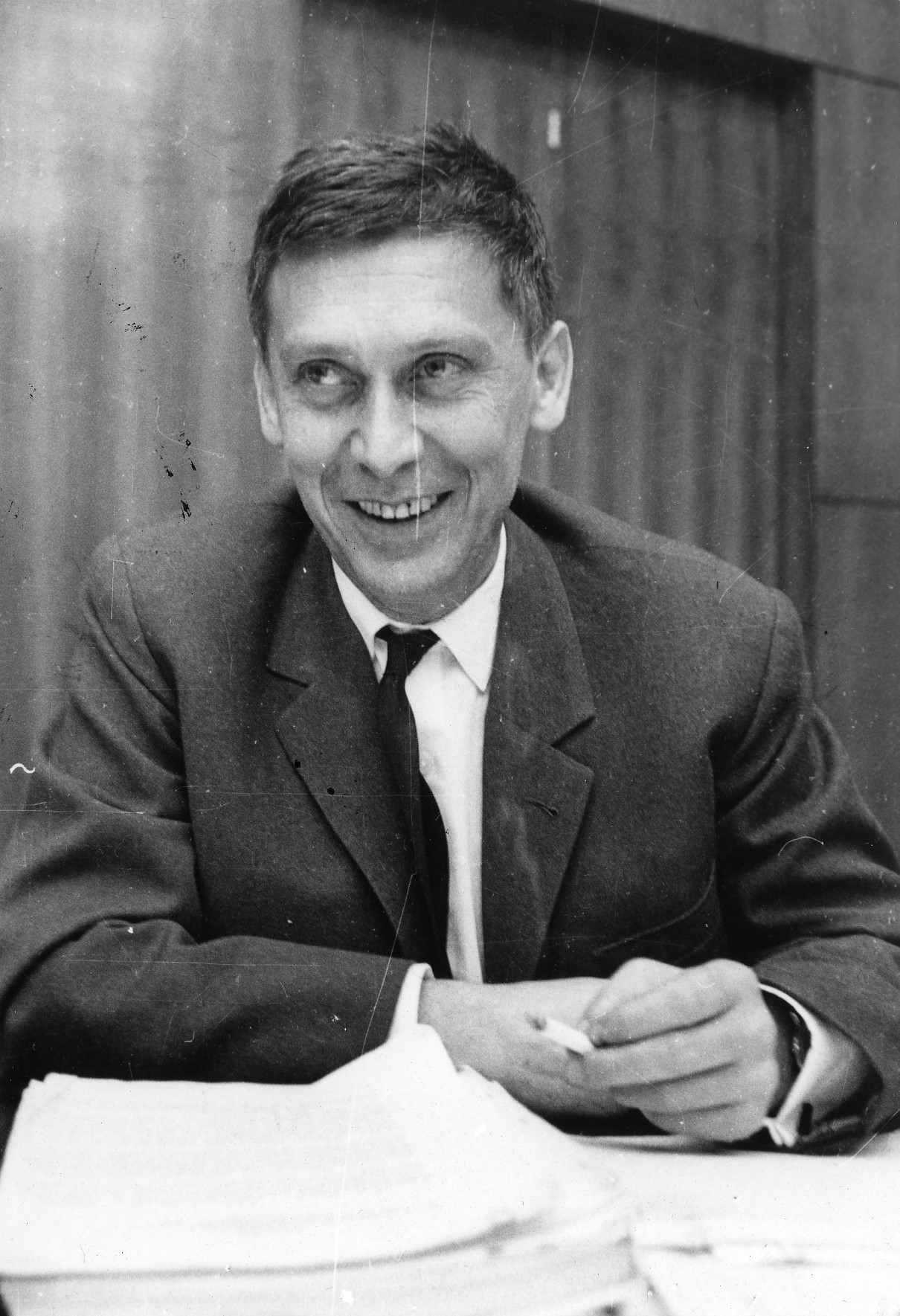
Slobodan Penezić "Krcun", head of Serbian branch of OZNA

The Department for Protection of the People – OZNA (Odeljenje za zaštitu naroda) was established on 13 May 1944 as central intelligence and counter-intelligence service within the National Committee for the Liberation of Yugoslavia. The division of OZNA for Central Serbia was established in June 1944, divisions for Vojvodina and Kosovo were set up in August that year while in October a special division was established for the City of Belgrade.

OZNA missions included intelligence work directed abroad and towards occupied territory, counter-intelligence protection of liberated territory and military counter-intelligence work.

During its two-year existence, the OZNA used illegal practices which included occasional mass murders of the "enemies of the people" having a notion of conducting the "revolution". The "enemies of the people" included not only local anti-communist forces but also notable individuals who did not support the communists, collaborators with the Axis powers during the occupation, wealthy individuals, and the Serbian Orthodox Church clergy as well as representatives of other religions. This period was also characterized by the strong presence of armed anti-communist operating in western Serbia representing a serious challenge to the new communist authorities. In combating armed anti-communist groups, the OZNA murdered prisoners without any investigation or trial, sometimes also murdering the civilians associated with them. The majority of the atrocities committed by OZNA were hidden from the public during the period of existence of the socialist Yugoslavia.

The Ministry of Justice established in 2005 the commission to research atrocities that were committed by members of the Yugoslav Partisan Movement after they gained control over Serbia in autumn 1944. The report of this commission presented a list of 59,554 registered killings after communist takeover in Serbia.

=== Directorate for State Security (UDB) and State Security Service (SDB) ===
After the adoption of Constitution of the Federal People's Republic of Yugoslavia in 1946, subsequent reorganisation of state bodies and state administration followed, according to which a "military" and "civil" part of the OZNA separated. Civilian sections transferred from the Secretariat of National Defence to the Secretariat of Internal Affairs and was renamed State Security Directorate while part which remained under the auspices of the Secretariat of the National Defence formed the Counterintelligence Service – KOS (Kontraobaveštajna služba).

Directorate for State Security – UDB (Uprava državne bezbednosti) was centralized at the federal level (through the Federal Secretariat of Internal Affairs) as well as at the level of secretariats of the internal affairs of six constituent republics and two autonomous provinces. It had the following missions: "organising service, undertaking measures and performing governing tasks with the aim of detecting and preventing activities oriented towards undermining and disrupting constitutionally determined economic, political and legal order and gathering information to this effect."

The UDB was a "political police", answerable to the Communist party organization from which it received its guidelines and to which it reported. The UDB was so deeply rooted in the political system that one of its tasks was the preparation of "political security assessments".

After the ousting of Aleksandar Ranković from power in 1966, process of transformation and decentralization of UDB began. The Federal State Security Service – SSDB (Savezna služba državne bezbednosti) was established within the Federal Secretariat for Internal Affairs and was mainly responsible for intelligence work abroad and coordinating republics' security services. Republics' state security services – SDBs (Službe državne bezbednosti), functioning within republic's secretariats of internal affairs, carried bulk of security work from then forward. This was the first time since the establishment of the socialist Yugoslavia that republics, therefore Serbia as well, gained control and greater influence over their respective security services.

Of primary interest to the SDB was domestic security; identifying and obstructing activities of the "domestic enemy" (i.e. the "bourgeois rightwing", clericalists, members of the Cominform, nationalists, and separatists). Intelligence work abroad was deemed less important and was under federal control.

=== State Security Directorate (RDB) ===
Emblem of the RDB

In 1991, in the midst of the break-up of Yugoslavia, the State Security Service of Serbia was transformed into the State Security Directorate – RDB (Resor državne bezbednosti) as part of the Ministry of Internal Affairs.

The State Security Directorate established in 1991 the Special Operations Unit whose numerous members have been implicated and some sentenced, for war crimes during the Yugoslav Wars, as well as for criminal activities.

On 3 October 1999, a vehicle column of Serbian Renewal Movement, one of largest opposition parties at the time, was attacked while moving down Ibar Highway. Four party officials were killed in the staged accident and party president Vuk Drašković was injured. In a 2007 ruling by the Belgrade District Court former State Security officer and unit's commander Milorad Ulemek, was sentenced to 15 years in prison, former Head of the State Security Directorate Radomir Marković received eight years while other members of the unit were sentenced to 14 years in prison.

On 25 August 2000, former president of Serbia and once a rival of Slobodan Milošević, Ivan Stambolić, was detained by the police. Soon after, he was gone missing during his every-day jogging routine. His remains were uncovered in 2003, in Fruška Gora. After a yearlong trial in special court in Belgrade, a judge found Radomir Marković and Milorad Ulemek, guilty of planning and carrying out the assassination of Ivan Stambolić.

=== Security and Intelligence Agency (BIA) ===
The State Security Directorate ceased to exist when the Security and Intelligence Agency was established, on 27 July 2002. For the first time in Serbian history, civil security and intelligence work was separated from the Ministry of Internal Affairs.

In May 2018, the Law on the Security and Intelligence Agency was amended, which gave additional powers to the director and it additionally defined details related to the work of the agency's employees. In March 2019, Directorate for Operations of the Security and Intelligence Agency was awarded the Order of Merit for Defense and Security.

During 2019, the BIA intercepted the handover of funds by a Russian intelligence lieutenant colonel to a retired Serbian Armed Forces officer.

In November 2023, the BIA exposed the activities of high-ranking Croatian diplomat Hrvoje Šnajder, who, as part of intelligence activities, collected information from Serbians active in politics, business and the NGO sector. Schneider was expelled from Serbia. In December 2023, a Bulgarian spy active in Bosilegrad, who was collecting information about Serbian police and military forces stationed in the south of Serbia, was arrested. On two occasions during January 2024, BIA agents arrested Serbian citizens who were collecting data, secrets and installing surveillance devices with the aim of threatening the movements of the Serbian Armed Forces, working on the behalf of the Albanian service. In February 2024, the BIA discovered the representative office of a foreign organization that was acting as an intelligence and subversive agent in Serbia, conducting classic espionage activity. Four Serbian citizens were arrested. In July 2024, the BIA in cooperation with the Military Security Agency and the Serbian police arrested employees of the Krušik defence company who had disclosed secret and confidential information to a foreign state.

== Missions ==
The main missions of the Security and Intelligence Agency are:

- security of the Republic of Serbia
- detection and prevention of the activities aimed at undermining or disrupting of constitutional order of the Republic of Serbia
- research, processing and assessing the security and intelligence data and information significant for the security of the Republic of Serbia and informing state authorities
- other activities defined by law

== Organization ==
The Security and Intelligence Agency is headed by the Director and is subdivided into directorates:

- Directorate for Operations (Uprava za operativni rad)
- Directorate for Intelligence (Uprava za obaveštajni rad)
- Directorate for Analytics (Uprava za analitiku)
- Directorate for Counterintelligence Protection (Uprava za bezbednosnu zaštitu)
- Directorate for Security (Uprava za obezbeđenje)
- Technical Directorate (Uprava za tehniku)
- Directorate for Research, Development and Education (Uprava za istraživanje, razvoj i obrazovanje)
- Logistics Directorate (Uprava za logistiku)

There are also six regional centers (regionalni centri) located in largest cities as well as 28 territorial centers (teritorijalni centri) in smaller towns spread throughout the country.

== Directors ==
The following is a list of heads of the Security and Intelligence Agency and its predecessors:

Name	Tenure
Department for Secret Police Work
Jovan Milovanović	1899–1900
Police Department
Tasa Milenković	1900–1901
Milutin Popović	1901–1903
Đorđe Đorđević	1903–1905
Dragutin Milićević	1905–1906
Obrad Blagojević	1906–1907
Čedomilj Kostić	1907–1909
Milorad Vujičić	1909–1916
Department for Public Security
Živojin Lazić	1919–1921
Department for State Protection
Vasa Lazarević	1921–1925
Radomir Todorović	1925–1929
Dobrica Matković	1929
Branko Žegarac	1929–1934
Nemanja Ljubisavljević	1934
Dragoslav Lazić	1934–1939
Cvetan Đorđević	1939–1940
Negoslav Ocokoljić	1940
Pavle Đorđević	1940
Department for Protection of the People (for Serbia)
Slobodan Penezić	1944–1946
Directorate for State Security (for Serbia)
Milorad Milatović	1946–1953
Vladan Bojanić	1953–1955
Srećko Milošević	1955–1961
Sava Radojčić	1961–1964
Dragoslav Novaković	1964–1966
State Security Service
Rajko Đaković	1966–1971
Milorad Bisić	1971–1974
Srdan Andrejević	1974–1976
Živomir Jovanović	1976–1978
Obren Đorđević	1978–1985
Dragutin Mitrović	1985–1990
Predrag Todorović	1990
Zoran Janaćković	1990–1991
State Security Directorate
Jovica Stanišić	1991–1998
Radomir Marković	1998–2001
Goran Petrović	2001
Andreja Savić	2001–2002
Security and Intelligence Agency
Andreja Savić	2002–2003
Miša Milićević	2003–2004
Rade Bulatović	2004–2008
Saša Vukadinović	2008–2012
Nebojša Rodić	2012–2013
Aleksandar Đorđević	2013–2017
Bratislav Gašić	2017–2022
Aleksandar Vulin	2022–2023
Tomislav Radovanović	2023–2024
Vladimir Orlić	2024–present

== Traditions ==
=== Day of the Agency ===
Day of the Security and Intelligence Agency is celebrated on 17 October, the anniversary of the establishment of the first security and intelligence service of Serbia. On that day in 1899, the Department for Secret Police Work is founded.

=== Patron saint ===
The patron saint (krsna slava) of the Security and Intelligence Agency is Saint Michael the Archangel (Aranđelovdan).

== In popular culture ==
- Serbian TV series Državni službenik follows the work of one BIA field agent.
- Documentary TV series produced by Radio Television of Serbia Tajne službe Srbije explores the history and lives of notable people during the history of the Agency.
- Novel Služba (English: Service) by the former BIA agent Goran Živaljević.

== See also ==
- National security of Serbia
- National Security Council
- Military Security Agency
- Military Intelligence Agency
- List of intelligence agencies
