= Military Security Agency =

Security and counterintelligence agency of the Serbian Armed Forces

- Војнобезбедносна агенција
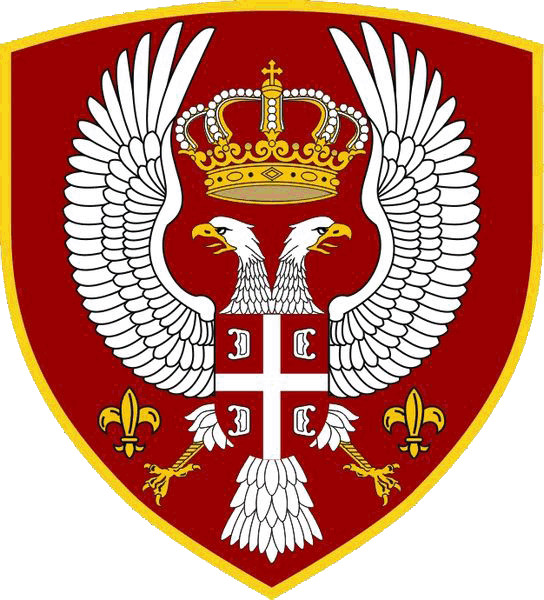
- Emblem of the Military Security Agency

Agency overview
- Formed: 1876; 150 years ago (current form since 2004)
- Preceding agency: Military Security Service
- Jurisdiction: Serbia
- Minister responsible: Bratislav Gašić
- Agency executive: Major general Đuro Jovanić, Director
- Parent agency: Ministry of Defence
- Website: www.vba.mod.gov.rs

The Military Security Agency (Serbian: Војнобезбедносна агенција, romanized: Vojnobezbednosna agencija; abbr. ВБА / VBA) is a Serbian military security and counterintelligence agency of Serbia, organizational unit of the Ministry of Defence.

== History ==
=== XIX century ===
During the reign of Prince Miloš Obrenović, precautionary measures and prudence were taken during admission to military service. Those measures were applied to select recruits, assess the behavior of soldiers in the unit, but also to prevent the disclosure of military secrets.

The first legal act in which the security issues of the armed forces were defined in a comprehensive way is the Military Law, adopted on 12 November 1839. Chapters XIV and XV of the Military Law specify acts and sanctions for treason, desertion, rebellion and other forms of individual or collective action of military personnel against the interests of the people. In articles 7 and 8, acts of espionage and acts against the constitution and "the freedom of the people" are elaborated in particular.

Military security and intelligence activities gradually developed in the Principality of Serbia and experienced significant development, especially after gaining independence in 1878. On 6 February 1876, a Department for Intelligence and Counterintelligence Tasks (Odeljenje za obaveštajne i kontraobaveštajne zadatke) was established within the General Staff of the Armed Forces of the Principality of Serbia.

=== Intelligence Department and Intelligence Directorate ===
In 1920, four departments were established within the General Staff of the Armed Forces of the newly-formed Kingdom of Serbs, Croats and Slovenes, the fourth of which, the Intelligence Department (Obaveštajno odeljenje), performed military intelligence and counterintelligence activities. Intelligence Department was in charge of suppressing enemy actions harmful to the interests of the army and the country, monitoring the writings of the domestic and foreign press, as well as research and the creation of military codes. Counterintelligence centers were established in 1928.

With the reorganization of the General Staff in 1941, three separate directorates were established, among them the Intelligence Directorate (Obaveštajna direkcija), which had three departments: intelligence, counterintelligence and the code department. The competence of the counterintelligence department was the protection of military units, army commands and headquarters, as well as military institutions and institutes. The structure of that department consisted of counterintelligence departments in military territorial institutions and counterintelligence bodies in military units, in charge of counterintelligence protection of commands, headquarters and units.

=== World War II ===
In 1942, the Supreme Headquarters of the People's Liberation Army and Partisan Detachments issued the first instruction on the organization of intelligence and counterintelligence services in Yugoslav Partisans units. The unified intelligence and counterintelligence service was established that same year and was organized into two sections: the Intelligence Section and the Counter-espionage Section - both tasked with the protection of partisan units, the fight against the “fifth column”, the enemy's propaganda and breaking his codes.

In 1943, the Section for the Protection of the People was established with mission of counterintelligence protection of free territory and partisan units. Following year it was succeeded by the Department for People's Protection (OZNA) which at first dealt with the collection of intelligence data for the needs of operational units, and later it increasingly turned to the fight against espionage. The task of the Second Section of OZNA was the counterintelligence protection of the liberated territory and the fight against the internal enemy, while the Third Section was in charge of counter-intelligence protection of the armed forces of the People's Liberation Movement.

=== Counterintelligence Service ===
On 13 March 1946, the Third Section of OZNA was abolished and replaced with newly-formed the Counterintelligence Service - KOS (Kontraobaveštajna služba). Its main mission was counterintelligence protection of the Yugoslav Army from intelligence-subversive activities, prevention of the actions of foreign intelligence services to Yugoslav Army, as well as security measures in the units of the armed forces.

The KOS was reorganized several times, in accordance with changes in the organization of the Yugoslav Army. As part of the reorganization of the army in 1948, the Directorate of the KOS became part of the General Staff of the Yugoslav Army, as the 12th Directorate of the General Staff.

Simultaneously with counterintelligence work, KOS organized special courses for the training and education of its members. The KOS School was established in 1950 with course lasting one year. In 1955, the School Security Center was founded in Pančevo, which included the Security School and the Military Police School. Since 2009, that institution has been operating as the Center for the Training of Personnel of the Military Security Agency.

=== Security Directorate ===
In 1955, the counterintelligence service was renamed the Security Directorate (Uprava bezbednosti) and has been subordinated to the Federal Secretariat for National Defence.

The main mission of the Military Security Directorate was to detect and prevent activities directed against the security and combat readiness of the Yugoslav People's Army as well as to protect military secrets. The Security Directorate was organized in two main divisions: counterintelligence and preventive. The Counterintelligence Division dealt with preventing the activities of foreign intelligence services, using counterintelligence work methods and special purpose means. The Preventive Security Division worked in order to protect secret military data and the most important military facilities.

In 1992, after the break-up of Socialist Federal Republic of Yugoslavia and formation of Federal Republic of Yugoslavia (consisting of Serbia and Montenegro), the Security Directorate was subordinated to the General Staff of the Armed Forces of Serbia and Montenegro.

=== Military Security Service ===
In 2002, the Security Directorate was transformed into the Military Security Service (Vojna služba bezbednosti) and was transferred back from the General Staff to the Federal Ministry of Defence.

Within its jurisdiction, the Military Security Service was responsible for: security and counterintelligence protection of the commands, units and institutions of the Armed Forces of Serbia and Montenegro and the Federal Ministry of Defence; counterintelligence protection of the highest-ranking military officers and officials of defence ministry; organizing and carrying out preventive security work in the commands, units and institutions of the Armed Forces of Serbia and Montenegro; implementation and control of data protection measures; carrying out security checks of persons for admission to work of the Armed Forces of Serbia and Montenegro and the Federal Ministry of Defence.

Mechanisms of democratic and civilian control of the Military Security Service were introduced. The law stipulated establishment of parliamentary commission responsible for the control of the constitutionality and legality of the work of the Military Security Service; the compliance of its work with the national security policy, for the control of respect of human rights and freedoms; respect for the political, interest and ideological neutrality; control the application of special means and methods for data collection; the audit of spending budgetary funds.

The military police and counterintelligence functions were separated in 2003, on the basis of which the Military Security Agency, as an organizational unit of the Federal Ministry of Defence, and the Directorate of Military Police, as an organizational unit of the General Staff, were formed.

=== Military Security Agency ===
The Military Security Agency officially began functioning on 1 January 2004. The work of the Military Security Agency is regulated by the Law on the Military Security Agency and the Military Intelligence Agency which stipulates the competences, missions, supervision and control of both VBA and VOA, cooperation as well as other issues important for their work.

== Missions ==
The Military Security Agency is tasked with providing security to the defence system of the Republic of Serbia i.e. planning, organizing and realization of tasks and activities which pertain to the security and counterintelligence functions.

Security missions include:

- Security protection of forces, facilities, assets and activities of the Ministry of Defence and the Serbian Armed Forces
- Security protection of classified data of the Ministry of Defence and the Serbian Armed Forces
- Security protection and crypto-protection of information and telecommunication systems the Ministry of Defence and the Serbian Armed Forces
- Industrial safety of the Serbian defence industry

Counterintelligence missions are:

- Suppressing intelligence and other activities of foreign services, organizations and persons directed at the Ministry of Defence and the Serbian Armed Forces
- Counterintelligence protection of persons, facilities and activities of the Ministry of Defence and the Serbian Armed Forces
- Discovering and documenting criminal acts against the constitutional order and security of the Republic of Serbia, as well as against humanity and international law, when the perpetrators of those acts appear to be persons employed in the Ministry of Defence and the Serbian Armed Forces
- Detecting and documenting criminal acts with elements of organized crime, as well as criminal acts of corruption within the Ministry of Defence and the Serbian Armed Forces or when the aforementioned crimes are directed towards the Ministry of Defence and the Serbian Armed Forces

== Organization ==
The Military Security Agency is headed by the Director and is subdivided into directorates:

- Operations (Operacije)
- Analytics (Analitika)
- Logistics (Podrška)
- Administration (Opšti poslovi)
- Inspector General (Unutrašnja kontrola)

There are also VBA centers (Centri VBA) detached to organizational units of the Ministry of Defence and the Serbian Armed Forces.

== Directors ==
The following is a list of heads of the Military Security Intelligence Agency and its predecessors:

| Name | Tenure |
Third Section of the Department for Protection of the People
| Jefto Šašić | 1944–1945 |
| Vjekoslav Klišanić | 1945 |
| Ivan Rukavina | 1945–1946 |
Counterintelligence Service
| Ivan Rukavina | 1946–1947 |
| Blažo Janković | 1947–1948 |
| Đoko Jovanić | 1948 |
| Srećko Manola | 1948–1953 |
| Ivan Rukavina | 1953–1955 |
Military Security Directorate
| Ivan Rukavina | 1955–1959 |
| Rudolf Pehaček | 1959–1960 |
| Srećko Manola | 1960–1963 |
| Mirko Bulović | 1963–1970 |
| Radovan Vojvodić | 1970–1974 |
| Asim Hodžić | 1974–1980 |
| Georgije Jovičić | 1980–1984 |
| Stane Brovet | 1984–1988 |
| Đorđe Miražić | 1988–1990 |
| Vuleta Vuletić | 1990–1992 |
| Nedeljko Bošković | 1992–1993 |
| Aleksandar Dimitrijević | 1993–1999 |
| Geza Farkaš | 1999–2000 |
| Milan Đaković | 2000–2001 |
| Aco Tomić | 2001–2002 |
Military Security Service
| Aco Tomić | 2002–2003 |
| Momir Stojanović | 2003 |
Military Security Agency
| Momir Stojanović | 2004 |
| Svetko Kovač | 2004–2014 |
| Petar Cvetković | 2014–2018 |
| Đuro Jovanić | 2018–present |

== Traditions ==
=== Day of the Agency ===
Day of the Military Security Agency is celebrated on 17 November, the anniversary of the adoption of the 1839 Military Law of the Principality of Serbia, first legal act in which the security issues of the armed forces were defined in a comprehensive way.

=== Patron saint ===
The patron saint (krsna slava) of the Military Security Agency is Saint Stefan Teoctist.

== See also ==
- Military Intelligence Agency
- Intelligence and Reconnaissance Directorate
- Security and Intelligence Agency
