= Nebojša Rodić =

Serbian politician (born 1953)

- Небојша Родић
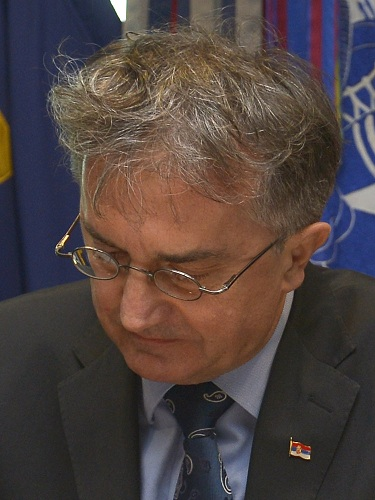

Ambassador of Serbia to Austria
- Incumbent
- Assumed office 26 July 2018

Ambassador of Serbia to Azerbeijan
- In office 2014–2018

Minister of Defence
- In office 2 September 2013 – 27 April 2014
- Prime Minister: Ivica Dačić
- Preceded by: Aleksandar Vučić
- Succeeded by: Bratislav Gašić

Director of the Security Intelligence Agency
- In office 3 August 2012 – 3 September 2013
- Prime Minister: Ivica Dačić
- Preceded by: Saša Vukadinović
- Succeeded by: Aleksandar Đorđević

Personal details
- Born: 1953 (age 72–73) Šabac, PR Serbia, FPR Yugoslavia
- Party: Serbian Progressive Party
- Education: University of Belgrade

Nebojša Rodić (Serbian Cyrillic: Небојша Родић, born 1953) is a Serbian politician, lawyer and diplomat who currently serves as the Ambassador of Serbia to Austria. He served as the Minister of Defence of Serbia from 2 September 2013 to 27 April 2014 and as the Director of the Security Intelligence Agency from 3 August 2012 to 3 September 2013. He is a member of the Serbian Progressive Party.

== Biography ==
He graduated from the University of Belgrade, Faculty of Law in 1977, while he passed the bar exam in 1979. In addition, he graduated from the School of National Defense in the center of military high schools "Maršal Tito".

He worked in the state administration bodies of Serbia and later was the Assistant Minister of Information and Deptuty State Secretary.

From 2005 to 2007, he was the director of the High Technological School of Vocational Studies in Šabac.

After the 2012 Serbian parliamentary election and the formation of the new Dačić cabinet, Rodić was appointed Director of the Security Intelligence Agency. He served at this function until September 2013, when he was named as the new Minister of Defence replacing Aleksandar Vučić. He served at this function until April 2014 when he was named as the Ambassador of Serbia to Azerbaijan.

In 2018, he was named as the new Ambassador of Serbia to Austria.

Political offices
Preceded by Aleksandar Vučić	Minister of Defence of Serbia; 2013 – 2014	Succeeded by Bratislav Gašić
Preceded by Saša Vukadinović	Director of the Security Intelligence Agency; 2012 – 2013	Succeeded by Aleksandar Đorđević
