= Blagoje Grahovac =

Montenegrin author

Blagoje Grahovac (Montenegrin Cyrillic: Благоје Граховац; born 6 April 1949) is a Montenegrin author, journalist, geopolitical analyst, and retired Yugoslavian general.

== Early life, military career, and career as a political advisor ==
Grahovac was born Bosnian Serb family in Nevesinje, in what was then the People's Republic of Bosnia and Herzegovina in the Federal People's Republic of Yugoslavia. He finished high school in Mostar and afterward joined the Air Force of the Yugoslav People's Army (JNA), graduating from the academy in Zadar, Croatia, in 1970. He later graduated from the Army and Air Defence Command and Staff Academy and the School of National Defence in Belgrade. As a pilot officer, he served in Zadar, Titograd, Sarajevo, and Belgrade.

After the dissolution of the Socialist Federal Republic of Yugoslavia in 1992, Grahovac served as an officer in the Federal Republic of Yugoslavia's Yugoslav Army (VJ). On 25 December 1998, he was promoted from major general to lieutenant colonel general. He was deputy chief of staff for air force and anti-aircraft defence at the VJ headquarters before being retired against his will in 1999. Within the VJ, Grahovac was an opponent of Nebojša Pavković, who served as commander of Third Army during the Kosovo War and was later convicted by the International Criminal Tribunal for the former Yugoslavia (ICTY) for war crimes and crimes against humanity.

In 2000, Grahovac began working for Montenegrin president Milo Đukanović as a defence and military advisor. During this time, he was frequently attacked in the Montenegrin media by journalists loyal to Yugoslavian president Slobodan Milošević. Grahovac later worked as an advisor to the president of Serbia and Montenegro and the president of the Montenegrin assembly.

The Federal Republic of Yugoslavia was reconstituted as the State Union of Serbia and Montenegro in 2003. Grahovac strongly opposed the appointment of Momir Stojanović as the first head of the new federal state's Military Security Service (VSB), later describing Stojanović as having been "both the left and the right hand of General Pavković in Kosovo." The state union ceased to exist in 2006, when Montenegro declared independence.

In 2012, Grahovac identified corruption and organized crime as the leading threats facing Montenegro. Despite his previous affiliation with Milo Đukanović, he criticized Đukanović in this period as overseeing a fundamentally corrupt administration.

== Author and journalist ==
Grahovac has written for journals including the Montenegrin Vijesti and the Serbian Danas. In July 2017, he wrote an article for the latter paper addressing the 1991–92 breakup of Yugoslavia. In reviewing the causes of the breakup, he wrote, "The main culprits are bandit networks made up of military and state secret services, criminal and underground and above-ground, and elected politicians who were firmly supported by their political parties. Those politicians were elected based on their personality profile, which was dominated by their greed for the power of money and the power of government. The work of the network of domestic bandits on the ground was coordinated by a powerful service from the East, but some from the West were also involved."

Grahovac implicated Serbian parties such as the Socialist Party of Serbia (SPS), the Yugoslav Left (JUL), and the Serbian Radical Party (SRS), as well as the Croatian Democratic Union (HDZ), the Bosniak Party of Democratic Action (SDA), and the Democratic Party of Socialists of Montenegro (DPS) in this process, also identifying the Serbian Progressive Party (SNS) as part of the same legacy. He wrote, "The question arises as to why the institutions and officials of the international community have been cooperating so closely with the Balkan criminal political gamblers for so long. The answer lies in the fact that neoliberalism, as the most vicious form of fascism, is sweeping the planet, and that the Balkan war gamblers have very skillfully adapted to that process." He ended the essay by calling for a new anti-fascist rising of the Balkan people to break this cycle, as well as for European Union officials to end their cooperation with the parties responsible for this state of affairs.

He has advocated for Serbia to recognize the independence of Kosovo if a variety of conditions are met, including representation of Kosovo's Serb and Montenegrin populations in a bicameral parliament, Serbian access to natural resources equal to Serbia's level of investment, a guarantee that Kosovo will not unite with any other state for a period of ninety-nine years (which, in practice, would prevent the union of Kosovo with Albania), and an agreement for Serbia and Kosovo to enter an alliance (union) of independent and internationally recognized states for a period of at least twenty years. Barring this, he has said that the next best approach would be a mutually acceptable division of Kosovo, with verification by the United Nations Security Council.

Grahovac has written several books, including the following:

- Opasne stvari (2010)
- Lice nacije (2011)
- Geopolitika i Balkan (2012)
- Geopolitički rebus (2013)
- Braća po gluposti (2014)
- Glasovi iz gluve sobe (2015)
- Banditosi ili Ubice država (2016)
- Tri cunamija (2017)
