= Military Intelligence Agency =

Intelligence agency of the Serbian Armed Forces

- Војнообавештајна агенција
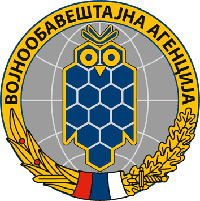
- Emblem of the Military Intelligence Agency

Agency overview
- Formed: 1886; 140 years ago (current form since 2004)
- Preceding agency: Security Directorate
- Jurisdiction: Serbia
- Headquarters: Belgrade
- Minister responsible: Bratislav Gašić
- Agency executive: Brigadier general Vladimir Planić, Director
- Parent agency: Ministry of Defence
- Website: www.voa.mod.gov.rs

The Military Intelligence Agency (Serbian: Војнообавештајна агенција, romanized: Vojnoobaveštajna agencija; abbr. ВОА / VOA) is the military intelligence agency of Serbia, organizational unit of the Ministry of Defence. It is responsible for providing military information, as well as representing and protecting the military interests of Serbia abroad and carries out its tasks through activities of military intelligence and military diplomacy.

== History ==
With establishment of the General Staff of the Armed Forces of the Principality of Serbia, by the 1876 Act on the General Staff Organization, the bearer of the military intelligence activities was the First Susbsection of Operations Section of the General Staff (Prvi odsek Operativnog odeljenja Đeneralštaba). In 1884, it was transformed in the External Subsection of the Operation Section of the General Staff (Spoljni odsek Operativnog odeljenja Đeneralštaba) acting as the intelligence service of the Royal Serbian Army.

The missions and competneces of the External Subsection were subsequently extended and in 1900 it was renamed to Subsection for Reporting of the Operation Section (Izveštajni odsek Operativnog odeljenja).

During World War I, when the General Staff was transformed into the Serbian Supreme Command, the Subsection for Reporting of the Operation Section became the Intelligence Subsection of the Operation Section of the Supreme Command (Obaveštajni odsek Operativnog odeljenja Vrhovne komande).

In 1920, four departments were established within the General Staff of the Armed Forces of the newly-formed Kingdom of Serbs, Croats and Slovenes, the fourth of which, the Intelligence Department of the General Staff (Obaveštajno odeljenje Generalštaba), performed military intelligence and counterintelligence activities.

After the World War II, the General Staff of the Yugoslav People’s Army had an Intelligence Section which in 1947 became Second Directorate within the General Staff of the Yugoslav People’s Army. Subsequently, in 1950s it was renamed to the Intelligence Directorate the General Staff of the Yugoslav People’s Army (Obaveštajna uprava Generalštaba). It was in charge of assessing the level of threat to Yugoslavia, as well as of the intentions and capacities of the potential aggressor. Those estimates represented the basis for definition and adoption of the war doctrine and elaboration of the Yugoslav People’s Army’s war plans.

In 1992, after the break-up of Socialist Federal Republic of Yugoslavia and formation of Federal Republic of Yugoslavia (consisting of Serbia and Montenegro), the Intelligence Directorate was subordinated to the General Staff of the Armed Forces of Serbia and Montenegro.

In 2004, the Intelligence Directorate of the General Staff was disbanded, and its members were transferred to a newly formed Military Intelligence Agency (which assumed the greatest part of the tasks and competencies of the Intelligence department was established as an independent organizational entity and subordinated to the Ministry of Defense) and Intelligence and Reconnaissance Directorate of the General Staff (which was in charge of reconnaissance military units: infantry reconnaissance units of the Army, 353rd Recconnaissance Squadron of the Air Force and 224th Center for Electronic Action).

== Missions ==
The Military Intelligence Agency has three missions:

- providing support to the state and military leadership by submitting intelligence reports on risks and threats directed from abroad against the security of Serbia;
- Intelligence support to the Serbian Armed Forces in realization of its missions and tasks;
- Representation and protection of the Ministry of Defence and Serbian Armed Forces’s interests abroad;

Agency performs military intelligence tasks related to collection, analysis, assessment, protection and submission of data and information on potential and real threats, activities, plans or intentions of foreign countries and their armed forces, international organizations, groups and individuals. Data and information are of military, military-political and military-economical character.

== Organization ==
The Military Intelligence Agency is headed by the Director and is subdivided into following directorates:

- Operations (Operacije) – in charge of intelligence work, its planning, organization, coordination and management
- Analytics (Analitika) - in charge of processing collected information, including the production of informative and analytical materials on global and regional occurrences and processes, intentions and activities of conductors of military and non-military that threaten the security of the country from abroad as well as on the situation in areas of multinational operations in which members of the Serbian Armed Forces are deployed.
- Logistics (Podrška) - tasked with personnel, financial, technical and logistics support necessary for all the functions and tasks of the agency through activities of human, material and financial resources management including the intelligence education and training of agency members
- Cooperation (Saradnja) - tasked with planning, organization and realization of cooperation with foreign military intelligence and security services and international organizations.
- Planning (Planiranje) - responsible for drawing up annual, monthly and periodic work schedules, extraordinary and regular reports as well as the other documents in this field.
- Inspector General (Unutrašnja kontrola) - control of the legality of work and application of the powers of the agency's members, oversight and control of the realization of planned activities.

There are also VOA centers (Centri VOA) detached units that provides continuous, timely and safe data gathering and monitoring military and security situation in immediate and wide surroundings.

=== Defence Attaché Offices ===
The Defence Attaché Offices (Kancelarije vojnih atašea) carry out the military diplomacy mission and are responsible for representing and protecting the interests of the Ministry of Defence and Serbian Armed Forces abroad. Currently, there are 21 Defence Attaché Offices. The Defence Attaché Offices are composed of a Defense Attaché and a Defence Attaché Assistant in four countries (the United States, Russia, Germany and the United Kingdom), while in other countries DAOs are represented by a Defence Attache (neighbouring countries: Croatia, Hungary, Romania, Bulgaria, Northern Macedonia, Bosnia and Herzegovina; European countries: France, Italy, Spain, Austria, Greece, Belgium; Asian countries: China, Turkey, Israel; Аfrican countries: Egypt, Algeria).

== Traditions ==
Day of the Military Security Agency is celebrated on 5 March, the anniversary of forming the External Subsection of the Operation Section of the General Staff in 1884.

== See also ==
- Military Security Agency
- Intelligence and Reconnaissance Directorate
- Security Intelligence Agency
