= Dragan Velić =

Kosovar politician (born 1958)

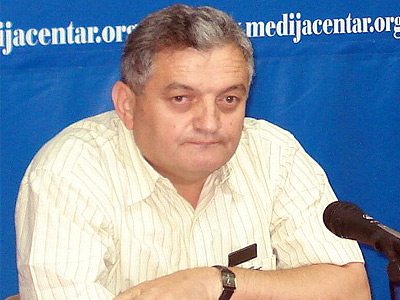

Prefect of the Kosovo District (2001–2004)

President of the Union of Serbian Districts and District Units of Kosovo and Metohija

Personal details
- Born: November 18, 1958 (age 67) Sušica
- Occupation: Politics

Dragan Velić (born November 18, 1958) is a Kosovo Serb politician, currently serving as president of the Union of Serbian Districts and District Units of Kosovo and Metohija, which currently is in dispute with unilaterally declared the Republic of Kosovo over the status of Kosovo. Velić was the Prefect of the Kosovo District, of the Autonomous Province of Kosovo and Metohija, from December 6, 2001, to September 28, 2004.

== Early years ==
Velić was born on November 18, 1958, in Sušica, in the municipality of Pristina, Yugoslavia. He graduated from the Faculty of Engineering, Construction Department, in 1982 in Priština. He finished his studies at the Faculty of Law.

== Career ==
He was the Technical Director and then Acting Director General of Binačka Morava Gnjilane from 1988 to 1991, and Secretary of Urban Planning and Construction of the City Assembly of Pristina from 1992 to 1997. In December 1999, he was a Sofia workshop participant, representing the Serb National Council, at the Sofia Declaration.

From December 6, 2001, to September 28, 2004, he was head of the Kosovo district; he was also chairman of the executive board of the Serbian National Council of Kosovo and Metohija (SNC) from 2002 to 2006. Velić was a 2003 Member of the European Centre for Minority Issues' Standing Technical Working Group.

He has participated in numerous projects, and one of the most important is the project on decentralization in Kosovo. Along with Randel Nojkic, Velic was sent as an observer in the Kosovo Transitional Council. He is the president of the Union of Serbian Districts and District Units of Kosovo and Metohija of North Kosovo, and the Coordinator of the Serbian Government Commission for Refugees, in charge of Kosovo. The unions are not recognised by Kosovo authorities, or by UNMIK

== Personal life ==
He resides in Novi Badovac in the municipality of Priština and is married with three children.
