= Operation Labrador =

1991 Yugoslav Air Force operation in Croatia

- Part of the Croatian War of Independence
- Type: Bombing
- Location: Zagreb, Croatia; 45.81154°N 15.981672°E
- Target: Jewish Community Centre and Jewish graves at the Mirogoj Cemetery
- Date: 19 August 1991
- Executed by: (Socialist Federal Republic of Yugoslavia) Yugoslav Air Force's Counterintelligence Service
- Casualties: None
- Zagreb on a map of Croatia

Operation Labrador was a false flag operation carried out by the Yugoslav Air Force's Counterintelligence Service (KOS) in the Croatian capital city of Zagreb during the early stages of the Croatian War of Independence. It was devised as a series of terrorist attacks intended to create an image of Croatia as a pro-fascist state. Two bombings were carried out on 19 August 1991, with one at the Jewish Community Centre and a second near Jewish graves at the Mirogoj Cemetery; there were no casualties. Additional attacks targeted the national railway network and were designed to implicate Croatian President Franjo Tudman. Operation Labrador was complemented by Operation Opera — a propaganda campaign devised by the KOS to feed disinformation to the media.

Further activities of Operation Labrador were abandoned in September, after Croatian authorities captured the Yugoslav Air Force regional headquarters in Zagreb, and confiscated documents related to the operation. The authorities took nearly a month to analyze the captured documents, allowing time for the principal agents involved in the bombings to flee. Fifteen others were arrested in connection with the attack, but they were subsequently released in a prisoner exchange. Five KOS agents involved in Operation Labrador were tried in the Federal Republic of Yugoslavia on terrorism charges and acquitted. Croatian authorities captured two KOS agents who were part of the operation and tried them along with seven other agents who were tried in absentia. Those in custody were acquitted, while those tried in absentia were convicted.

The existence of Operation Labrador was further confirmed through the testimony of a former KOS agent, Major Mustafa Čandić, during the trial of Slobodan Milošević at the International Criminal Tribunal for the former Yugoslavia in 2002.

== Background ==
In August 1990, an insurrection took place in Croatia centering in the predominantly Serb-populated areas of the Dalmatian hinterland near Knin, the Lika, Kordun, and Banovina regions, and eastern Croatia. The areas were subsequently named SAO Krajina (Serb Autonomous Oblast) and, after local leaders announced their intention to integrate SAO Krajina with Serbia, the Government of Croatia declared the SAO Krajina secession movement a rebellion. By March 1991, the conflict had escalated into the Croatian War of Independence. In June 1991, Croatia declared its independence as Yugoslavia disintegrated. A three-month moratorium followed, after which the declaration came into effect on 8 October 1991. The SAO Krajina, renamed Republic of Serbian Krajina (RSK) on 19 December 1991, responded with a campaign of ethnic cleansing against Croatian civilians.

With the Yugoslav People's Army (JNA) lending support to SAO Krajina leadership and the Croatian Police unable to cope with the situation, the Croatian National Guard (ZNG) was formed in May 1991. The development of the military of Croatia was hampered by a UN arms embargo introduced in September, while the military conflict in Croatia continued to escalate. The JNA maintained substantial forces in the Croatian capital, Zagreb, throughout 1991.

== Bombings ==
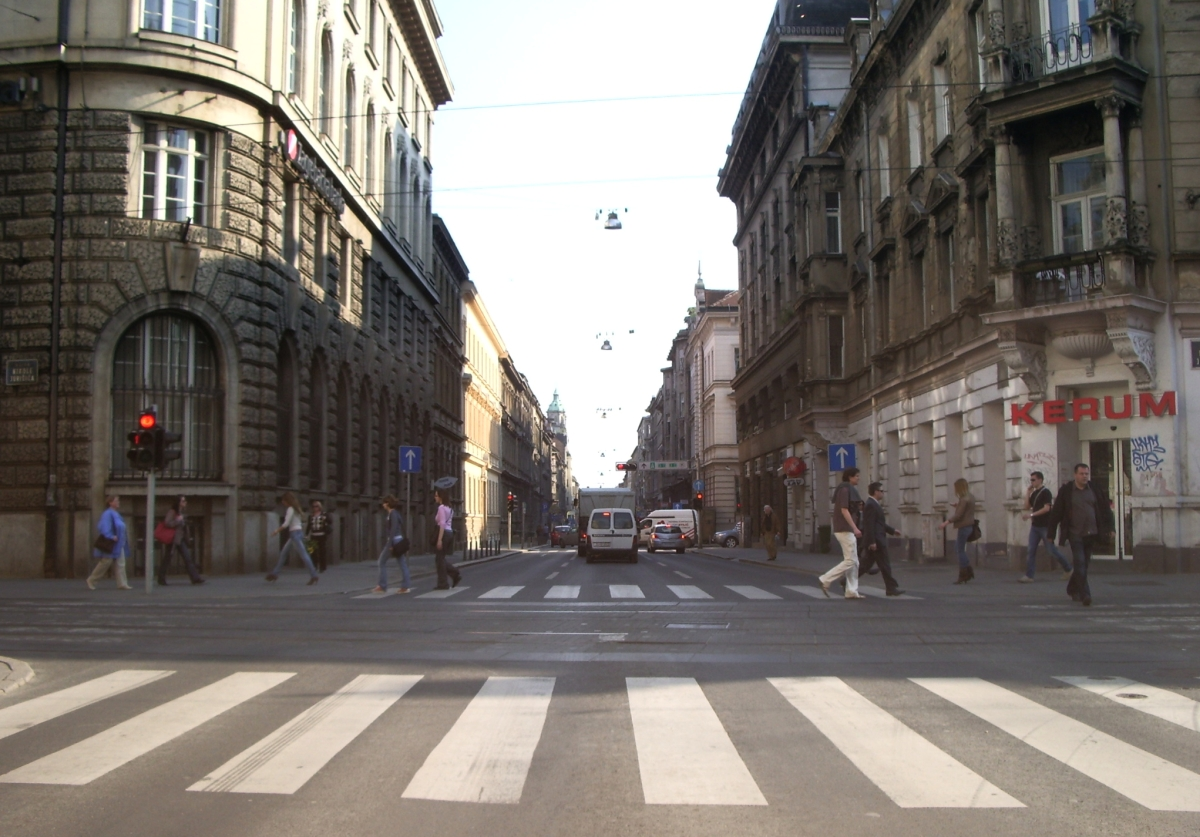
Palmotićeva Street in Zagreb

In August 1991, the Yugoslav Air Force's Counterintelligence Service (KOS) executed a series of activities, codenamed Operation Labrador, aimed at discrediting the new Croatian government. Operation Labrador was planned to include several terrorist attacks that would go hand-in-hand with the activities of Operation Opera — a propaganda campaign devised to feed disinformation to the media. The two operations were intended to portray Croatia as a pro-fascist state. An alternative name for Operation Opera was Operation Opera-Orijentalis, or Operation Opera Orientalis.

Operation Labrador was headed by Colonel General Slobodan Rakočević, head of the Yugoslav Air Force branch of the KOS, based in Zemun. In Zagreb, operational control of Labrador was assigned to Lieutenant Colonel Ivan Sabolović, and Major Čedo Knežević. Lieutenant Colonel Radenko Radojčić was tasked with the storage of a substantial quantity of explosives in Zagreb and its surrounding areas and the subsequent planting of explosive devices in designated locations. The explosives and other munitions were stored across several sites.

On 19 August, the Jewish Community Centre in Palmotićeva Street in Zagreb, and Jewish graves at the Mirogoj Cemetery, were bombed as a part of Operation Labrador. The explosions caused property damage, but resulted in no casualties. There were no public claims of responsibility for the attack. Aside from the two explosions in Zagreb, agents assigned to Operation Labrador were thought to also be responsible for bombing the Zagreb–Belgrade railway near Vinkovci and a railway line between Glina and Vojnić. The railway attacks have also been ascribed to Operation Opera.

== Aftermath ==
In the immediate aftermath of the bombings in Zagreb, Josip Manolić, who had just been appointed head of the Croatian intelligence service, claimed Croatian right-wing extremists were responsible. Operation Labrador was abandoned after the ZNG and the Croatian police captured the Yugoslav Air Force headquarters in Zagreb on 15 September 1991, during the Battle of the Barracks. The materials captured inside the facility included codes and computer disks related to Operation Labrador, as well as Sabolović's notes. Sabolović turned the materials over to his immediate superior at headquarters, Mirko Martić, but Martić failed to destroy them. In response, Sabolović fled Zagreb. Croatian police took almost a month to analyze the captured materials properly and uncover Operation Labrador. More than 50 operatives were arrested in October, including 9 Croatian officials from different government's agencies. Sabolović later claimed that only a part of the Operation Labrador network was dismantled, but he was contradicted by KOS Major Mustafa Čandić who was posted at the Zemun headquarters of KOS.

In autumn of 1991, Croatian intelligence services launched Operation Janissary (Operacija Janjičar) aimed at dismantling the remaining KOS network in Croatia. The operation was a joint operation of all Croatian intelligence services. It was authorized by Ivan Vekić and Gojko Šušak, then interior and defence ministers, and initially headed by Josip Perković. Fifteen suspects were arrested by the end of 1991; they were subsequently exchanged for Anton Kikaš, who was captured by the JNA while smuggling a plane-load of weapons to Croatia. The operation also produced a list of suspected KOS operatives in Croatia containing 1,789 names and pseudonyms.

Rakočević, Sabolović, Radojčić and two other former KOS agents were tried in Belgrade in 1993. The five were charged with instigation of terrorism and other crimes, but all were acquitted. Radojčić was arrested again in Zagreb in late 1993. The second Trial of Radojčić and eight other suspects charged in connection with Operations Labrador and Opera, held in Zagreb, ended with the acquittal of Radojčić and Ratomir Mažibrada, who were in custody, and the convictions of the other defendants who were all tried in absentia.

Testifying at the Trial of Slobodan Milošević at the International Criminal Tribunal for the former Yugoslavia in 2002, Čandić stated that all Operation Labrador agents left Zagreb and took the remaining documents with them. He also said that the KOS had an extensive network of informants within Croatian intelligence services and the ruling Croatian Democratic Union in 1991. Čandić also testified that the railway bombing near Vinkovci was intended to implicate Croatian President Franjo Tuđman.

Bomb damage to the Jewish Community Centre was repaired between February and September 1992, using government funds.
