= Dijana Čuljak =

Dijana Čuljak (born 12 February 1968) is a Croatian television host. She began to work as a reporter for Croatian Radiotelevision during the Croat–Bosniak War. She was also an editor of Otvoreno talk show. Today she is a news editor on Croatian Radiotelevision. Her role in Vranica Case is by many Bosniaks and Croats considered controversial. Vranica case was a massacre committed by Croatian forces during the HVO attack on Bosniak population in Mostar in May 1993.
