= Vranica massacre =

1993 mass killing during the Bosnian War

The Vranica massacre was the killing of 13 Army of the Republic of Bosnia and Herzegovina (ARBIH) prisoners of war on 10 May 1993 by the Croatian Defence Council (HVO), during the Bosnian War.

Two reporters from Croatian Radiotelevision (HRT), Dijana Čuljak and Smiljko Šagolj, made a television report about captured men in which both of them claimed that men were actually arrested terrorists who victimized Croat civilians, while recording them on tape as they were standing lined up at gun point in front of the building of former "Vranica" state company.

These two controversial journalists are still blamed by the families of victims in Vranica Case, for inciting massacre of Bosnian POWs' after broadcasting a false report.

The bodies of Bosnian POWs' were later found in Goranci Mass Grave.

== See also ==
- List of massacres in Bosnia and Herzegovina
