= Security Directorate (FR Yugoslavia) =

- Управа безбедности

Agency overview
- Formed: 20 May 1992
- Preceding agency: Counterintelligence Service
- Dissolved: 2004
- Superseding agencies: Military Security Agency; Military Intelligence Agency
- Jurisdiction: FR Yugoslavia
- Headquarters: Belgrade

The Security Directorate (Serbian: Управа безбедности, romanized: Uprava bezbednosti) was the security and intelligence branch of the Armed Forces of Serbia and Montenegro.

== History ==
When the Armed Forces of the Federal Republic of Yugoslavia was formed on 20 May 1992, the Security Directorate was moved from the Federal Secretariat of National Defence to the General Staff of the newly-formed armed forces.

In 2002, it was transformed into the Military Security Service (Vojna služba bezbednosti) and was transferred back from the General Staff to the Federal Ministry of Defence.

In 2004, it was reorganized and split into the Military Security Agency and the Military Intelligence Agency.

== See also ==
- Counterintelligence Service
