= Counterintelligence Service (Yugoslavia) =

Counterintelligence of Yugoslav People's Army

- Kontraobaveštajna služba

Agency overview
- Formed: 1946
- Preceding agency: OZNA
- Dissolved: 1992
- Superseding agency: Security Directorate
- Jurisdiction: SFR Yugoslavia
- Headquarters: Belgrade

The Security Directorate, best known by the acronym KOS (which is derived from the organization's original name in the Serbo-Croatian: Kontraobaveštajna služba - "Counterintelligence Service"), was the national military intelligence and security service of the Yugoslav People's Army (JNA) that existed from 1946 until the breakup of Yugoslavia. In 1992, the Security Directorate continued its work in Serbia and Montenegro.

== Founding and structure ==
The Counterintelligence Service (KOS) was formed in 1946 as one of the remnants of the Department for Protection of the People (OZNA), with Directorate for State Security (UDBA) forming the second component of the new security and intelligence structure of SFR Yugoslavia. In 1955, it changed its name to Security Directorate (Uprava bezbednosti) and relocated from the General Staff to State Secretariat of People's Defence, later Federal Secretariat of Peoples Defence.

== Activities ==
Most information is still scant due to its classification as military secret, but some can be traced in the media, especially during the Milošević tenure and the role played in the break-up of Yugoslavia (e.g. Operation Labrador).

== See also ==
- Department for Protection of the People (OZNA)
- Directorate for State Security (UDBA)
- Yugoslav People's Army
- Security Directorate
