= Bratislav Gašić =

Serbian politician (born 1967)

- Братислав Гашић
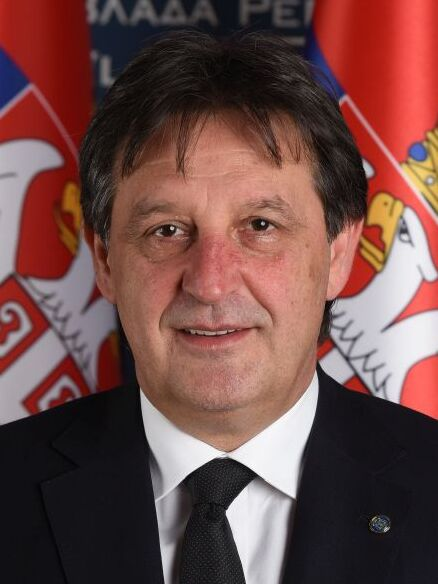
- Gašić in 2022

Minister of Defence
- Incumbent
- Assumed office 2 May 2024
- Prime Minister: Miloš Vučević; Đuro Macut
- Preceded by: Miloš Vučević
- In office 27 April 2014 – 5 February 2016
- Prime Minister: Aleksandar Vučić
- Preceded by: Nebojša Rodić
- Succeeded by: Dušan Vujović (acting)

Minister of Internal Affairs
- In office 26 October 2022 – 2 May 2024
- Prime Minister: Ana Brnabić; Ivica Dačić (acting)
- Preceded by: Aleksandar Vulin
- Succeeded by: Ivica Dačić

Director of the Security Intelligence Agency
- In office 23 May 2017 – 1 December 2022
- Prime Minister: Aleksandar Vučić; Ana Brnabić
- Preceded by: Aleksandar Đorđević
- Succeeded by: Aleksandar Vulin

Personal details
- Born: 30 June 1967 (age 59) Kruševac, SFR Yugoslavia
- Party: SNS (2008–present)
- Education: University of Niš
- Occupation: Politician

Bratislav Gašić (Serbian Cyrillic: Братислав Гашић; born 30 June 1967) is a Serbian politician serving as minister of defence since 2024. A member of the Serbian Progressive Party (SNS), he served as minister of internal affairs from 2022 to 2024, minister of defence from 2014 to 2016. He was the director of the Security Intelligence Agency (BIA) from 2017 to 2022.

== Education and career ==
He finished primary and secondary school in Kruševac and the Faculty of Economics within the University of Niš. From 1989, he began entrepreneurship in his native country and later worked many years in Greece. During the 1990s he worked in the coffee industry, mainly in export-import, and was one of the owners of prominent Serbian brands Grand coffee. During the 2000s, he ran several sports clubs in his home city of Kruševac, volleyball and football teams.

=== 2008–17 ===
He is one of the founders of the Serbian Progressive Party, founded in October 2008. Following the 2012 Serbian parliamentary elections when the Serbian Progressive Party took power, he was named the vice president of the party. Later he was named the president of the executive board of Srbijagas in March 2013. From June 2012 until April 2014 he was the mayor of Kruševac. He was elected as the Minister of Defence of Serbia on 27 April 2014 following the 2014 Serbian parliamentary elections. On 5 February 2016, he was sacked from the duty following the public pressure due to his sexist remarks towards B92 TV reporter Zlatija Labović, made on 6 December 2015.

=== 2017–2022: Head of Security Intelligence Agency ===
On 23 May 2017, he was appointed as the head of the Security Intelligence Agency (BIA). Following his appointment, he has suspended his party activities.

In August 2017, an amendments to the Law on the Security and Information Agency, which strengthen the authorities of the agency's director, have arrived in the Serbian Parliament for adoption. This move was condemned by several officials including the Commissioner for Information of Public Importance Rodoljub Šabić and former co-Minister of Internal Affairs of Serbia Božo Prelević. They have stated that these amendments are unconstitutional and thus way creating a platform for "party's intelligence agency" (Serbian Progressive Party), aimed at the opposition and "domestic traitors" who disagree with the ruling regime.

== Personal life ==
He is married and has three sons. He speaks English and Greek. His nickname is Bata Santos, given to him due to business with coffee.

Political offices
Preceded by Miloš Vučević	Minister of Defense of Serbia; 2024–present	Incumbent
Preceded by Aleksandar Vulin	Minister of Internal Affairs of Serbia; 2022–2024	Succeeded by Ivica Dačić
Preceded by Nebojša Rodić	Minister of Defense of Serbia; 2014–2016	Succeeded by Dušan Vujović (Acting)
Preceded by	Mayor of Kruševac; 2012–2014	Succeeded by
Government offices
Preceded by Aleksandar Đorđević	Head of the Security Intelligence Agency; 2017–2022	Succeeded by Aleksandar Vulin
Party political offices
Preceded by	Vice-president of the Serbian Progressive Party; 2012–2017	Succeeded by
