= List of equipment of the Salvadoran Armed Forces =

This is a list of the equipment used by the Salvadoran Armed Forces.

== Army ==
=== Armoured fighting vehicles ===
Model	Image	Origin	Quantity	Details
RECCE
AML-90		France	5	(4 more in store).
APC (W)
VAL Cashuat		El Salvador	30	
UR-416		West Germany	8	
PPV
BMC Vuran		Türkiye	11	
AUV
Sand Cat		Mexico; Israel	5+	

=== Anti-tank/anti-infrastructure ===
Model	Image	Origin	Caliber	Quantity	Notes
RCL
M67		United States	90mm	n/a	
SP
M40A1		United States	106mm	n/a	

=== Artillery ===
Model	Image	Origin	Caliber	Quantity	Notes
TOWED
M198		United States	155mm	12	
M102		United States	105mm	36	
M-56		Yugoslavia	105mm	18	(FRY).
Oto Melara Mod 56		Italy	105mm	4+	
MOR
M-74		Yugoslavia	120mm	n/a	(some M-74 in store).
UBM 52		Yugoslavia	120mm	12	
M29		United States	81mm	151	

=== Air defense ===
Model	Image	Origin	Quantity	Notes
GUNS
TCM-20		United States	4	
M-55		Yugoslavia	31	

== National Civilian Police ==
=== Armoured fighting vehicles ===
Model	Image	Origin	Quantity	Details
APC • PPV
BMC Vuran		Türkiye	8	

=== Aircraft ===
Model	Image	Origin	Quantity	Details
ISR
O-2A Skymaster		United States	1	
TPT • Light
Cessna 310		United States	1	

=== Helicopters ===
Model	Image	Origin	Quantity	Details
MRH
MD-520N		United States	2	
MD-500E		United States	7	
TPT • Light
Bell 205		United States	1	(UH-1H).
R-44 Raven II		United States	2	

== Navy ==
=== Patrol and coastal combatants ===
Class	Image	Ships	Origin	Tonnage	Note
PB
Bering 65		PM-14	United States	~105t	
Camcraft		PM-06; PM-07; PM-08	United States	~100t	
YP 660		PM-13	United States	~70t	
Defiant 85		PM-15	United States	55t	
Swiftships 77		PM-11	United States	48t	
Swiftships 65		PM-10	United States	~35t	
Type-44		PRM-01; PRM-02; PRM-03; PRM-04	United States	~16t	

=== Amphibious ===
Class	Image	Ships	Origin	Tonnage	Note
Landing Craft
LCM 8		BD-02; BD-03; BD-04; BD-05	United States	~60t	(of which 3†).

== Air Force ==
=== Aircraft ===
Model	Image	Origin	Quantity	Details
ATK
A-37B Dragonfly		United States	14	
ISR
OA-37B Dragonfly		United States	5	
O-2A Skymaster		United States	6	
O-2B Skymaster		United States	6	
TPT • Light
IAI-201 Arava		Israel	3	
Cessna 208B Grand Caravan EX		United States	1	
Cessna 337G Skymaster		United States	1	
TRG
R-235GT Guerrier		France	5	
T-35 Pillan		Chile	3	
SR22T		United States	2	
T-41D Mescalero		United States	1	

=== Helicopters ===
Model	Image	Origin	Quantity	Details
MRH
Bell 412EP Twin Huey		United States	4	(of which 1 VIP).
UH-1M Iroquois		United States	2	
MD-530F		United States	8+	
TPT• Light
Bell 205		United States	7	(UH-1H Iroquois).
Bell 407		United States	1	(VIP tpt, govt owned).
TRG
TH-300C		United States	2	(4 more TH-300 in store).
TH-300		United States	2	
