= M95 mortar =

Serbian-developed artillery weapon

Mortar 120mm М95 Long Range
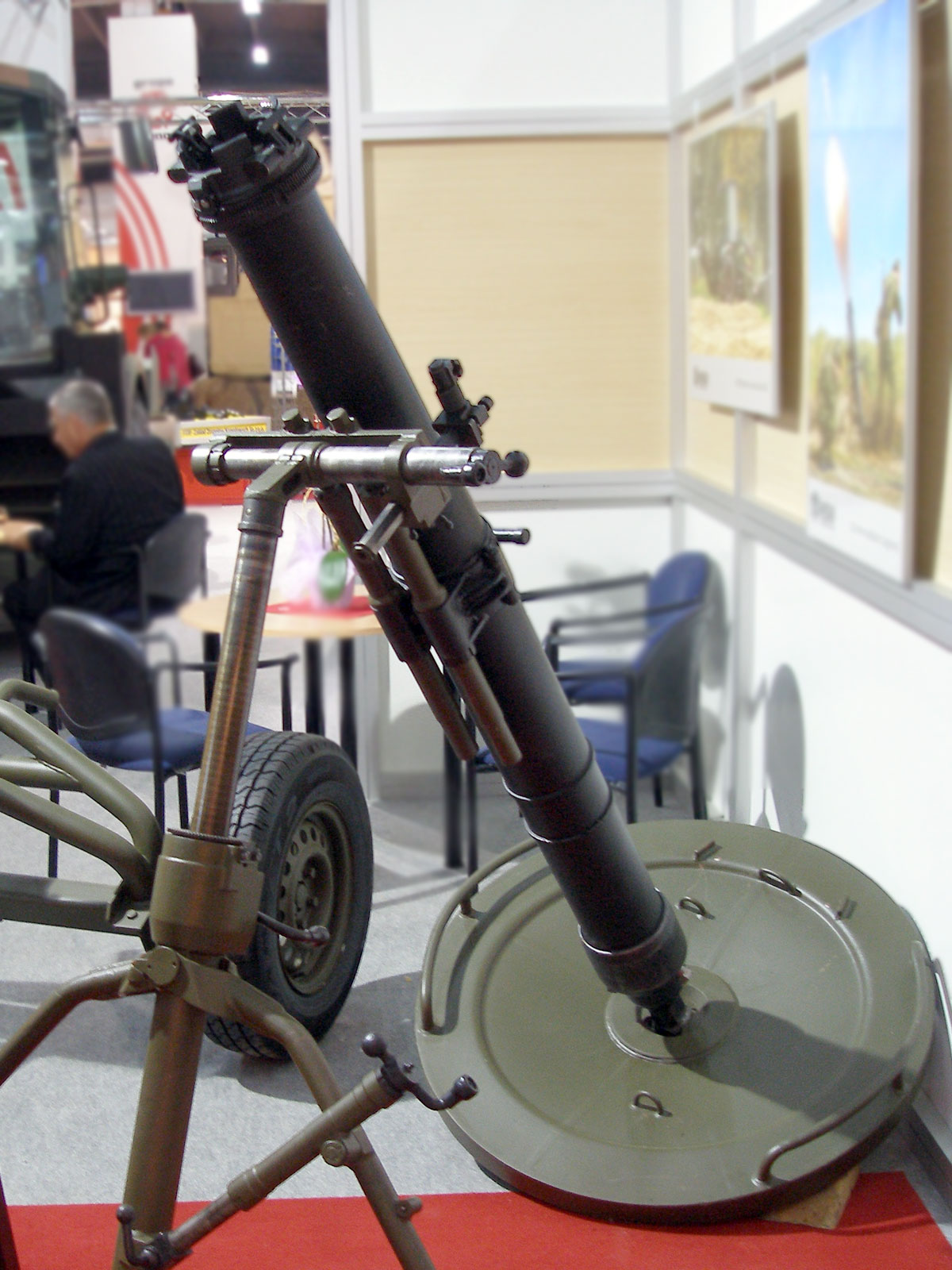
- Type: Mortar
- Place of origin: Serbia

Production history
- Designer: Military Technical Institute
- Designed: 1995
- Manufacturer: PPT Namenska

Specifications
- Mass: 212.0 kg (467.4 lb) on field 465.0 kg (1,025.1 lb) with trailer during transport
- Length: 2.089 m (6.85 ft)
- Crew: 5
- Caliber: 120 millimetres (4.7 in)
- Rate of fire: 15 RPM max, 4 RPM sustained
- Effective firing range: 9,400 metres (10,300 yd) with classic shells
- Maximum firing range: 13,500 metres (14,800 yd) with reactive mine RA HE shell M77
- Feed system: manual

The 120mm М95 Long Range Mortar is a 120 mm (4.7 in) mortar that was developed by Serbian Military Technical Institute. It is long-range and heavier mortar compared to the light mortar 120mm M75 and represents further development of Universal Mortar UB M52.

== Design overview ==
The М95 LONG RANGE Mortar fires fin-stabilized ammunition from a smoothbore barrel. It has muzzle attached to barrel to reduce pressure. М95's require trucks or other vehicle to move them, but compared to field artillery it is much lighter. M95 LONG RANGE mortar outrange all light and medium mortars and even some howitzers and mountain guns, his explosive power is much greater than 60mm and 81/82mm mortars. It can be deployed on battlefield in less than a minute. It uses NSB-5A sight for directing fire.

High explosive rounds 120 mm Mk12P1-L fired by the М95 LONG RANGE Mortar weight about 14.8 kg (33 lb) and have a lethal radius of 24 m (79 ft).

== Deployment ==
Mortar 120mm М95 LONG RANGE is in service with the Serbian Armed Forces since 1995. It has a mission to provide indirect fire support to units.

The M95 is transported with TAM-150, FAP 1118, Zastava NTV or other vehicles capable to attach 465 kg trailer.

== Specifications ==
Maximum range:	9,400 metres (30,800 ft) with classic shell Mk12P1-L - 13,500 metres (44,300 ft) with RA HE shell M77
Minimum range:	200 metres (660 ft)
Weight:	212.0 kilograms (467.4 lb) without ammunition
	465.0 kilograms (1,025.1 lb) when mounted on trailer
Rate of fire:	15 rounds/min first minute, 4 rounds/min sustained
Crew:	5

The M95 is capable of firing the following munitions:

- High explosive shells
  - HE mortar shell M62P8
  - HE mortar shell Mk12P1
  - HE mortar shell Mk12P1-L
- Illumination shells
  - Illumination mortar shell M87P1
  - Illumination mortar shell M01
- Smoke shells
  - Smoke mortar shell M64P2
  - Smoke mortar shell M64P3
  - Smoke mortar shell Mk12
  - Smoke mortar shell M89
- Practice shells
  - Practice mortar shell M63P2

and other shells in 120mm in accordance with barrel pressure.

== Operators ==
- Serbia

== See also ==
- Soltam M-65 120 mm mortar
- M327
- E56 120 mm Mortar
