= M-84AS1/2/3 =

M-84AS1 / M-84AS2 / M-84AS3
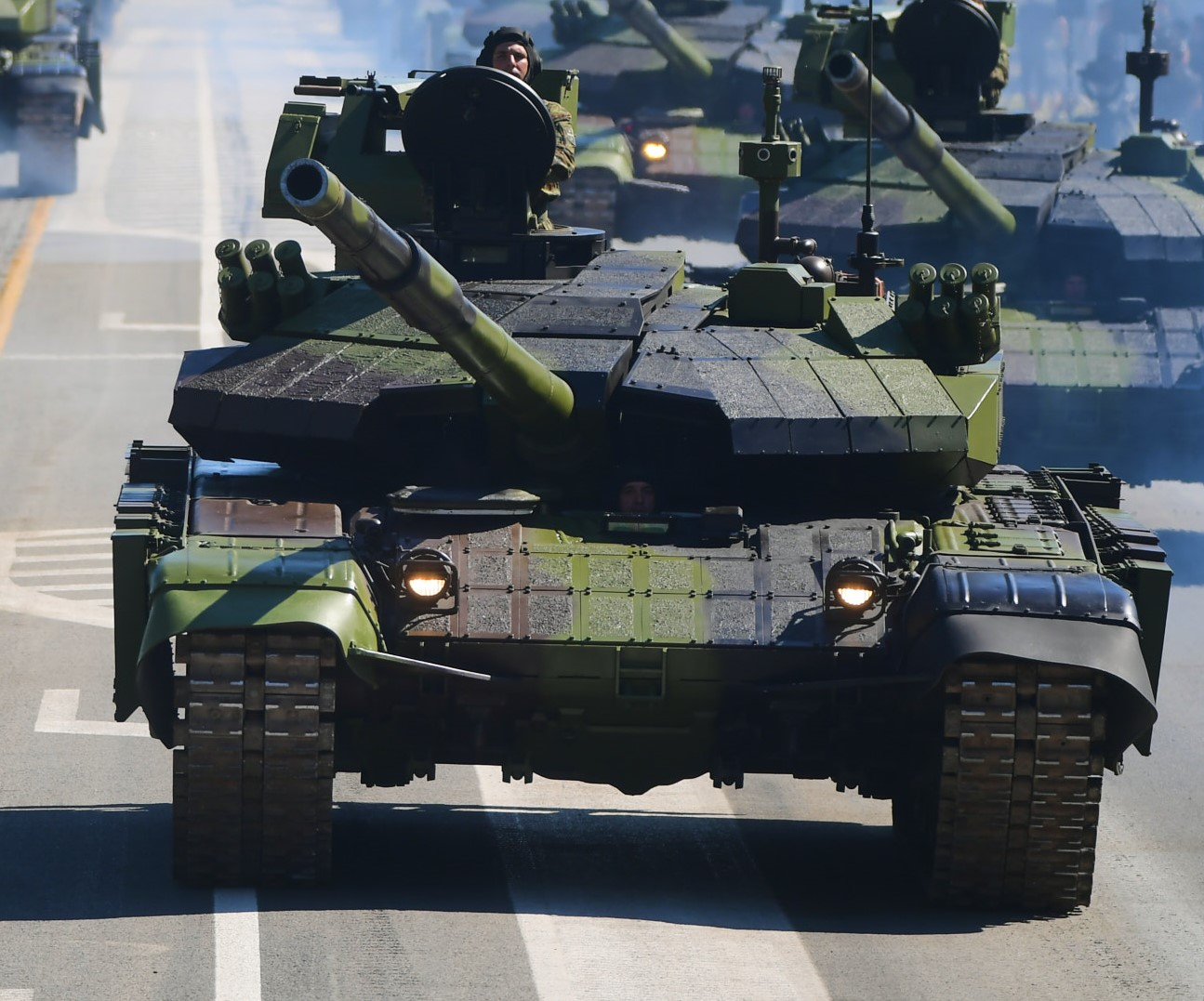
- M-84AS2 of the Serbian Army
- Type: Main battle tank
- Place of origin: Serbia

Service history
- Used by: Serbian Armed Forces

Production history
- Designer: Military Technical Institute
- Designed: 2017–2020
- Manufacturer: Technical Overhaul Institute "Čačak"
- Produced: 2023 (M-84AS2)
- No. built: ~30 (26 M-84AS2 in service with Serbian Army)

Specifications
- Mass: 45 tonnes
- Length: 9.53 m
- Width: 3.73 m
- Height: 2.23 m
- Crew: 3 (commander, gunner, driver)
- Armor: cylindrical pad, high-hardness steel, titanium, aluminium, tungsten, modular explosive reactive armour
- Main armament: 125 mm 2A46M smoothbore gun
- Secondary armament: 7.62 mm M86 coaxial machine gun, 12.7 mm M87 anti-aircraft machine gun
- Engine: diesel power pack V46-TK or V46TK-1; 1,000 or 1,200 hp power pack
- Power/weight: 26.7 hp/tonne
- Suspension: torsion bar
- Operational range: 600 km
- Maximum speed: 60 km/h

The M-84AS1, M-84AS2, and M-84AS3 are modernization programs for Serbia's fleet of M-84 main battle tanks, which are Yugoslav-era variants of the Soviet T-72. Developed by Serbia's Military Technical Institute and produced by the Technical Overhaul Institute "Čačak", these are primarily upgrade packages rather than new-build tanks which aim to extend the service life of the Serbian Army's aging M-84 fleet into the 2030s and beyond, incorporating domestic innovations alongside some imported components. Unveiled in 2017, the programs focus on enhancing firepower, protection, mobility, and situational awareness to counter modern threats like tandem-warhead anti-tank missiles and drones.

== Design and development ==
The imperative for Serbia to modernize its aging Yugoslav-era M-84 main battle tank fleet presented the Military Technical Institute and the broader Serbian defense industry with numerous challenges.

Serbia inherited some 212 M-84 from Yugoslavia of which most never experienced any kind of modernization since their adoption. Though a modernization program for the M-84 called the M-84AB1 (later renamed to M-84AS), featuring several Russian weapon systems, was unveiled in 2004, it never saw mass adoption and only 10 M-84s were upgraded to this standard, probably due to the financial and political situation in Serbia at that time.

Since then, tank designs around the world have seen a number of fundamental improvements like the incorporation of explosive reactive armour, updated subsystems and optics and even the addition of active protection systems. It became evident that even the M-84AS modernization was obsolete and a completely new modernization program was needed to bring the M-84 to a level where it could keep up in terms of effectiveness and protection.

The first version of the tank, designated M-84AS1, was presented in 2017. Later variants, M-84AS1 (presented in 2020) and M-84AS3 (presented in 2025), feature numerous improvements, such as domestically developed modular explosive reactive armour, a modern battlefield management and fire-control system, a remote controlled weapon station, and other updates. A total of 21 subsystems were updated with modern solutions. The M-84AS1 and AS2 were developed in parallel and differ in the number of implemented subsystems and some specific turret modification regarding RCWS, the commander's hatch and equipment implementation. The M-84AS2 is likely going to be used as a platoon commander's tank as soon as mass modernization begins.

=== M-84AS1 ===
The first version of M-84AS1, officially unveiled in 2017, featured several changes and improvements compared to the M-84A and basic M-84 including original model of T-72. Domestic first-generation explosive reactive armour was applied (comparable to Kontakt-5), covering a bigger area of the front turret and a sizeable portion of the front plate, providing better protection. A new fire-control system with domestic laser and radar warning systems was implemented along with a 12.7mm remotely controlled weapon station and a soft active protection suite. The back of the hull and turret is further fitted with cage armour while armour plates attached to the frontal hull remained. Although these changes were an improvement over the previous M-84, this design still had major flaws, especially when it comes to protection. It was criticized for the low reactive armor coverage, bad sensor placements and low situational awareness. The weaknesses of this initial version were recognized and further development of the modernization package commenced. The result was a revised M-84AS1 which was presented in 2020.

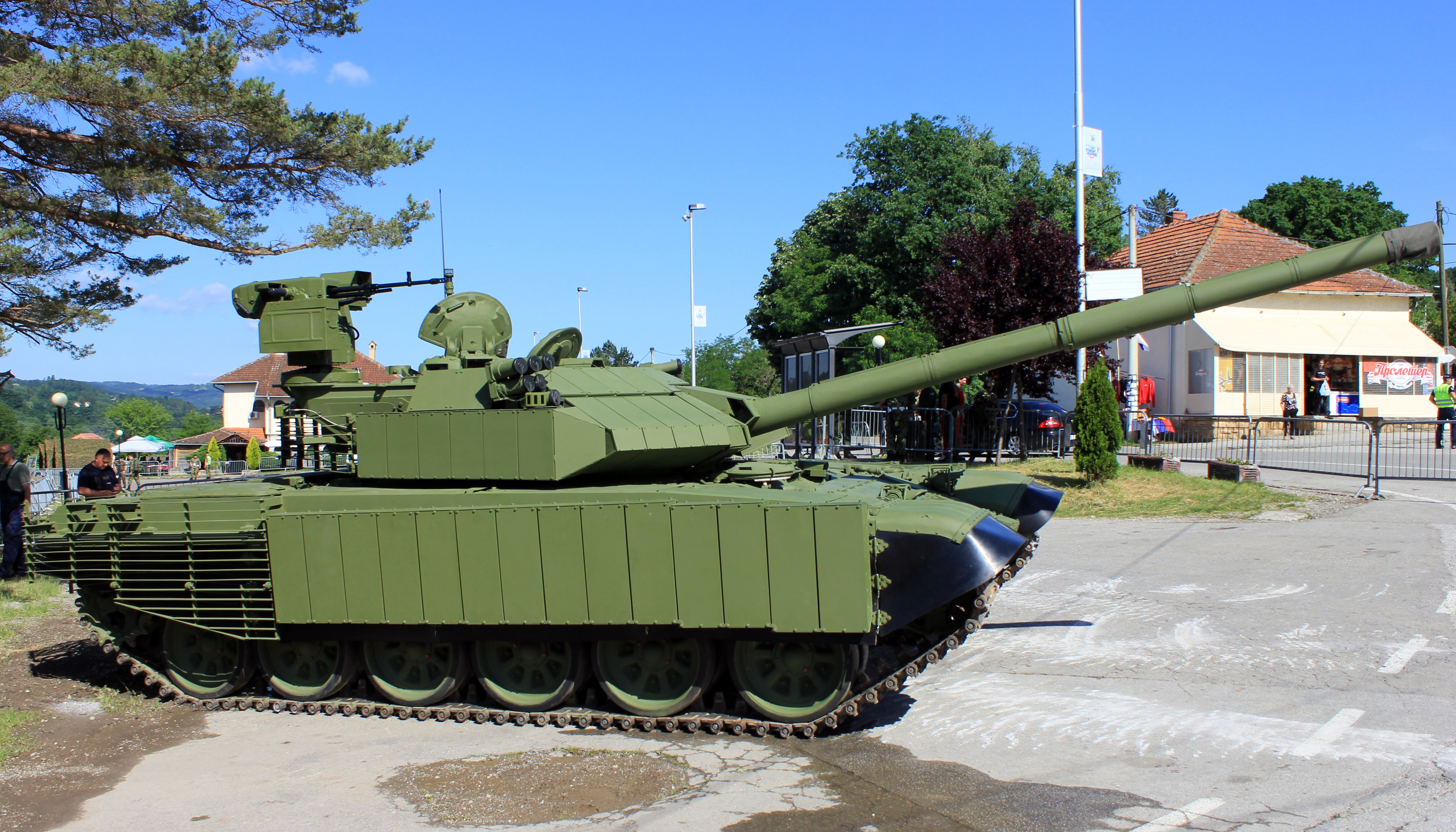
M-84AS1

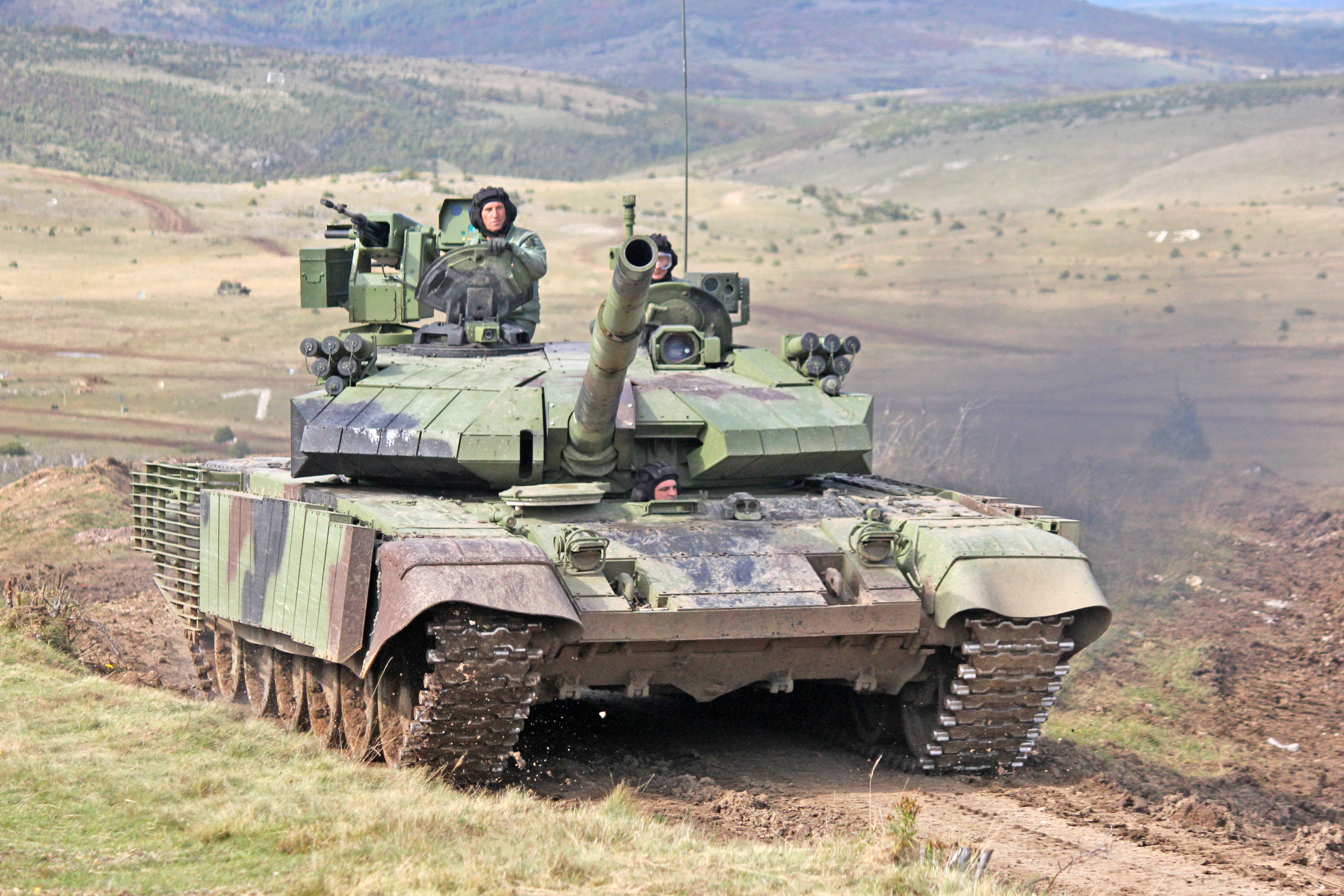
M-84AS1

The M-84AS1 version unveiled in 2020 corrected many of the flaws that were found on the previous version. The turret and hull were almost completely covered with domestic second-generation explosive reactive armour M19, providing increased protection from modern threats like top-attack or tandem-charge missiles according to the designers. A total of nine new subsystems were integrated. Among them an improved fire-control system with an integrated day/night sight and new sensors. New forms of passive and active protection system were developed. Protection against top attack missiles like FGM-148 Javelin was increased by using better composition of modular explosive reactive armour that protects top of turret and soft kill active protection system that is using smoke grenades with infrared smokes to create smoke screen in order to block missile guidance. Day/night, thermal cameras and commander scope with 6 low light cameras with other sensors increased situation awareness of tank crew. Early warning sensors for detection of radar, laser designation and launching of rockets are coupled with automatic delivery of Smoke grenade towards threat to achieve protection. Second generation (comparable to third generation in other countries) of domestic explosive reactive armour ERO-19, better than Kontakt-5 and comparable with Relikt, was developed to protect against newer tandem charge HEAT warheads. Additional slat armor for protection against rocket-propelled grenades was also present. Automatic fire extinguisher capable to react in milliseconds with modern UV sensors for fire detection was added to stop explosions in tank compartments. New type of RCWS with 12.7mm machine-gun was added. In total about 21 new subsystems were developed to increase survivability, mobility and precision. CBRN defense was increased with new sensors and automation process. New tank gun 125mm with modern thermal sleeve and new ammunition with better penetration and explosive characteristics including 125mm airburst round was introduced.

=== M-84AS2 ===
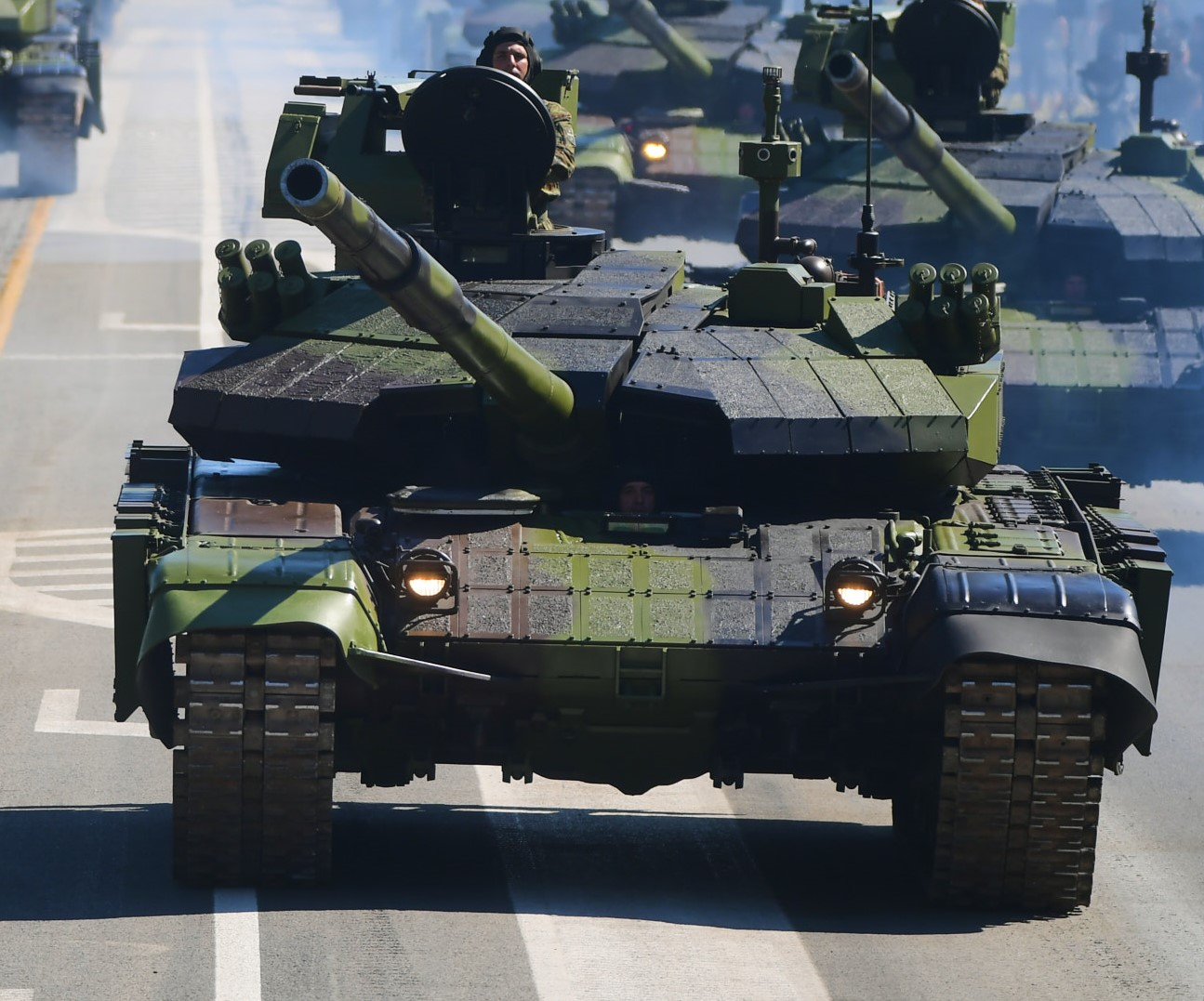
M-84AS2

The M-84AS2, tailored for platoon commanders, builds on the earlier AS1 prototype with refined subsystems. Its 125mm smoothbore gun, a Zastava-made evolution of the 2A46M, uses an autoloader to maintain an eight-round-per-minute firing rate, with ammunition including APFSDS rounds penetrating 500mm of armor at 2 km, programmable airburst munitions for infantry, and Refleks ATGMs for targets up to 5 km. A thermal sleeve improves barrel durability during sustained fire. The AS2’s protection suite features the domestically developed M19 explosive reactive armor (ERA), with enhanced coverage on the turret roof to counter top-attack threats like drones. Slat armor guards against RPGs, while a soft-kill active protection system, inspired by Russia’s Shtora-1, uses multispectral smoke and laser jammers to disrupt incoming missiles. A 360-degree laser and radar warning system alerts the crew to threats, complemented by automatic fire suppression and NBC (nuclear, biological, chemical) protection. The fire-control system includes a GEN III cooled thermal imager, short-wave infrared camera, and laser rangefinder, enabling target detection at 18 km. The commander’s stabilized panoramic sight supports hunter-killer operations, while a battlefield management system links the tank to broader networks. A stabilized 12.7mm remote-controlled weapon station (RCWS) engages drones and infantry safely. Powered by a 1,000 hp V-46-TK diesel engine (upgradable to 1,200 hp), the 46-ton tank hits 60 km/h on roads and 45 km/h off-road, with a 600 km range. Upgraded tracks and suspension extend component life to 8,000 km.

Many improvements adopted for M-84AS2, gave better final results than some other current modernization programs developed for T-72. While basic armour of some T-72 versions is better than basic armour of M-84, additional newer and better placed modular explosive reactive armour provides better cover and protection and new systems provide much better additional situation awareness with better gun and ammunition. The M-84AS2 variant features an improved engine over a regular T-72 giving, an overall edge in combat to M-84AS2 compared most other modernized T-72 variants. In terms of protection, it is often considered even better than its Russian T-72B3 counterpart.

=== M-84AS3 ===
M-84AS3 is an upgraded variant of the M-84AS2, officially unveiled in 2025. It features a hard-kill active protection system, reportedly Israeli-produced Iron Fist, which intercepts incoming projectiles with explosive countermeasures. This addresses vulnerabilities seen in conflicts like Ukraine, where top-attack munitions devastated older tanks. The AS3 expands M19 ERA coverage and adds steel-composite laminates and electromagnetic anti-mine skirting for better defense against kinetic penetrators and IEDs. Its fire-control system upgrades include enhanced radar warning and a refined four-channel gunner’s sight, improving target acquisition. The RCWS gains better stabilization for anti-drone roles, and programmable HE rounds are optimized for urban combat. Communications systems now integrate with drones and artillery spotters, while CBRN protections are strengthened. The AS3 may adopt a 1,200 hp engine, potentially reaching 72 km/h, enhancing agility in Serbia’s varied terrain.

== Production ==
Produced and integrated by the Technical Overhaul Institute "Čačak" and overseen by the Military Technical Institute, these are primarily upgrade packages rather than new-build tanks.

Besides the Technical Overhaul Institute "Čačak", which acts as the integrator, numerous companies participate in production of tank subsystems:

- 14. oktobar - modular tank engine manufacturer, engine and transmission parts, ammunition shells
- Sloboda - ammunition and smoke dispensers
- PPT Namenska - hydraulics, transmission parts and turret movement system
- ATB Sever - automatic loading system
- Teleoptik žiroskopi - optics, gyroscopes and gyroscopic devices, and fire-control system with software, electronics and electronic elements of the active protection system
- Zastava kovačnica - tracks
- Yugoimport SDPR - 125mm gun and barrels, welded turrets, RCWs, radio-logical-chemical subsystem, fire suppression subsystems
- EI Opek - detection of cumulative charge breach for automatic fire extinguisher, tank ammunition fuses
- Imtel komunikacije - Radar warning and direction finding system, part of the tank's active protection system
- Zastava Arms - 12.7mm machine-guns and 7.62mm coaxial machine-guns

== Operators ==
- Serbia – 26 M-84AS2 in service with the Serbian Army.

== See also ==
- M-84
- M-84AS
- M-84D
