= Miloš (unmanned ground vehicle) =

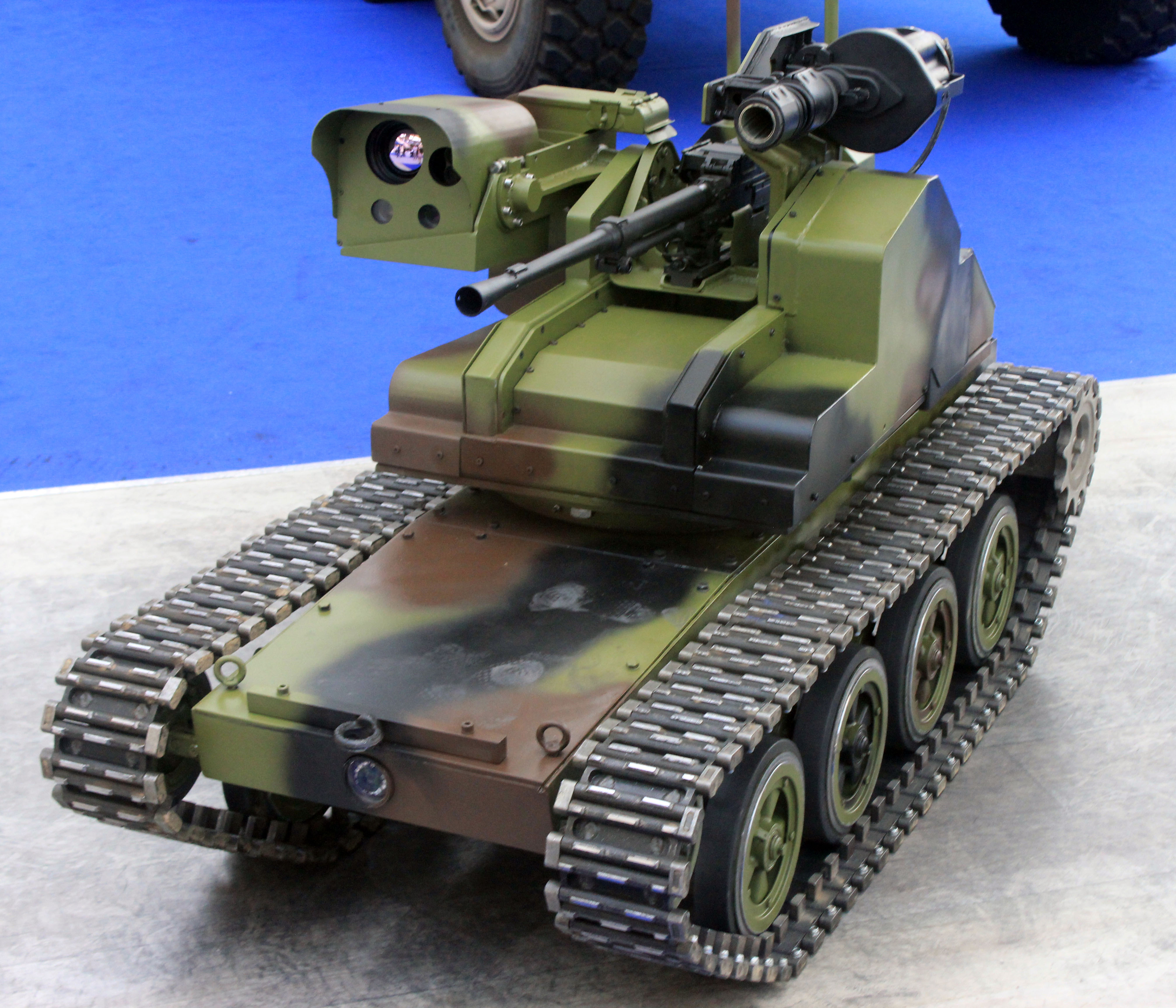
- Type: Unmanned ground vehicle
- Place of origin: Serbia

Production history
- Designer: Military Technical Institute
- Manufacturer: PPT Namenska
- Produced: 2017
- No. built: 15+

Specifications
- Mass: 430 kg (950 lb) 680 kg (1,500 lb) armed
- Length: 1.725 m (5.66 ft)
- Width: 0.770 m (2.53 ft)
- Height: 0.475 m (1.56 ft) 0.950 m (3.12 ft) armed
- Armor: STANAG I – 7.62mm
- Main armament: Zastava M86 7.62mm machine-gun, M11 grenade launcher, option RBR M90 Stršljen and other armament options including smoke grenades
- Engine: electric engine powered on Li-Ion battery
- Payload capacity: 1 wounded or sick on medic variant
- Transmission: tracked
- Operational range: 4.5h moving, 3h move and shoot on rough terrain, surveillance and weapon system works up to 8h
- Maximum speed: 12.5km per hour
- Guidance system: encrypted radio up to 3000 meters, using routers on UAV or helicopters up to 10km

Miloš (Serbian Cyrillic: Милош), also called Little Miloš (Serbian: Мали Милош, romanized: Mali Miloš), is an unmanned ground vehicle (UGV) developed by the Military Technical Institute, following the development of the unmanned ground vehicle Milica in 2009. UGV Miloš is in serial production and its first customer is the Serbian Armed Forces.

== Overview ==
In 2009, the Military Technical Institute presented its first battle UGV, Milica. Continuous development lead to a new UGV named Miloš. Miloš has improved autonomy and a smaller remote-control station that can be carried and operated by a single soldier. The UGV can fit into a small trailer and can be carried by smaller 4x4 military vehicles or in numbers on larger vehicles to the deployment zone. For surveillance and detection it uses a thermal camera, a day and night camera, and a laser ranger. It has one or two weapons attached to its turret. Maximum total weight is around 700 kg (1,500 lb) or 300 kg (660 lb) of cargo. Two day/night cameras are installed on the front and back for driving. It can recognize a friendly soldier using a charge coupled device at a range of up to a 1,000 metres (3,300 ft), and has a thermal camera that enables recognition at up to 450 metres (1,480 ft). Included as part of the equipment is a laser rangefinder with a range of up to 2,000 metres (6,600 ft).

It was presented to the public at the 2017 Partner military fair in Belgrade.

== Versions ==
There are several versions of Little Miloš:

- Armed
- Transport
- Medical evacuation

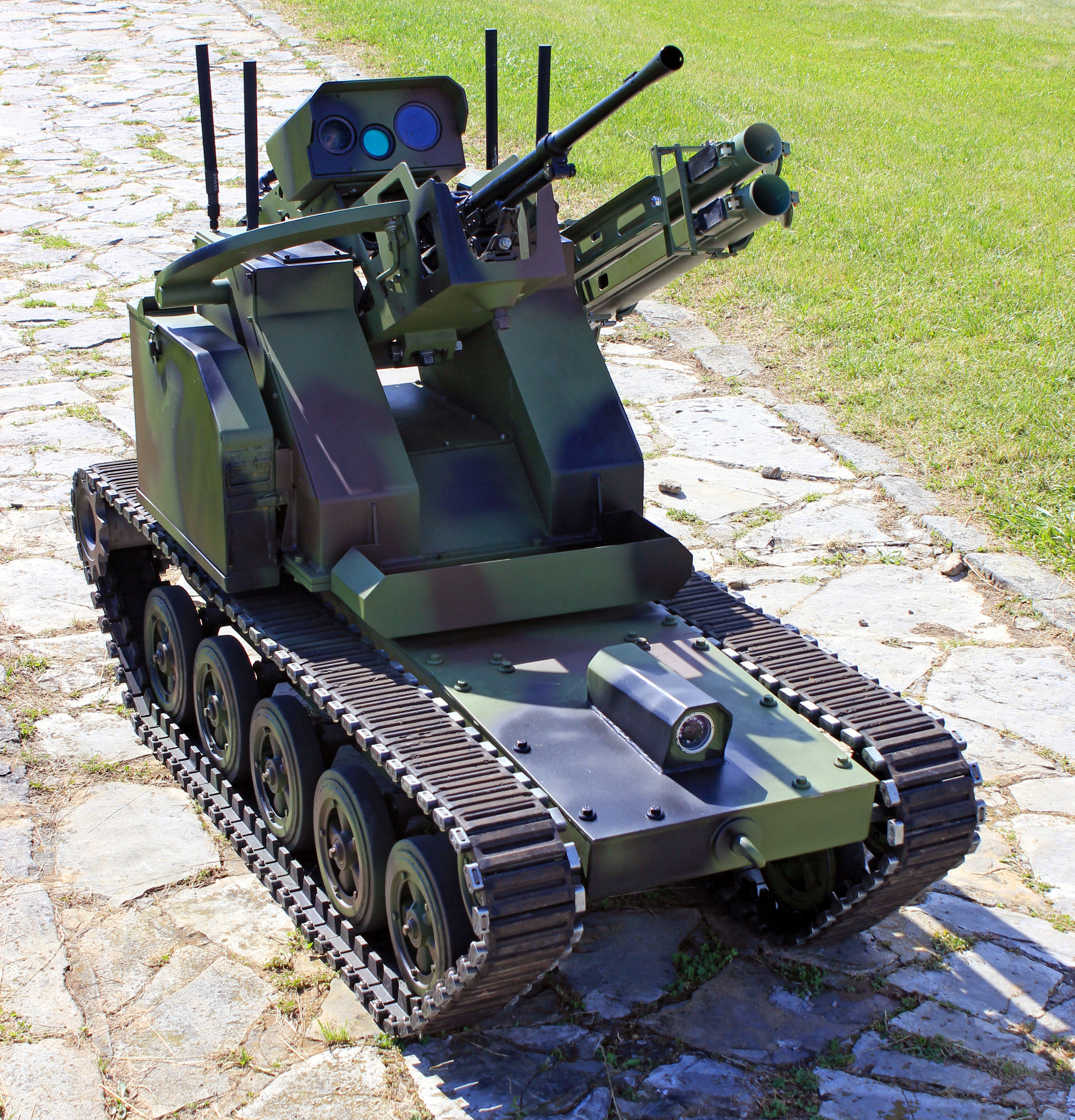
UGV Miloš armed with additional M80 Zolja

== Operators ==
Serbia – 15 in service in the 72nd Brigade for Special Operations of the Serbian Armed Forces

== Potential operators ==
After the 2018 UMEX fair, the UAE requested to test UGV Miloš for their armed forces.

== See also ==
- Foster-Miller TALON
