= M74 light mortar =

M74
- Type: Light mortar
- Place of origin: Yugoslavia

Service history
- In service: 1981–present
- Used by: see Operators
- Wars: Salvadoran Civil War; Yugoslav Wars

Production history
- Designer: Military Technical Institute
- Manufacturer: PPT Namenska

Specifications
- Mass: 105 kg in firing position 219 kg in transport
- Crew: 5
- Caliber: 120 millimetres (4.7 in)
- Rate of fire: 12 rpm for M74
- Effective firing range: 6400m for M74
- Feed system: manual

The M74 is a Yugoslav 120mm light mortar designed by the Military Technical Institute. It is a smoothbore, muzzle-loading, high-angle-of-fire weapon used for long-range indirect fire support. It is currently produced by the Serbian company PPT Namenska and the Bosnian company BNT.

== Description ==
This mortar can be deployed as infantry support for destruction of personnel and enemy firing positions, for opening routes through barbed wire obstacles and mine fields, for demolition of fortified objects, for destructing infrastructure elements, illumination and deploying smoke screen. The M74 model when disassembled could be carried by 3 soldiers thus having unique capabilities regarding transport in area with obstacles or in urban area compared with more heavier mortars. M74 provides 12 rds per minute rate of fire and it is intended to be used to deliver 15-20 mines before moving to another position. Since it is very light regarding its caliber it can be easily airdropped and parachuted to firing position. It uses NSB-4B sight for firing. Base-plate of M74 mortar is triangle shaped.

== Specifications ==
Maximum range:	6,400 metres (21,000 ft)
Minimum range:	250 metres (820 ft)
Weight:	105.0 kilograms (231.5 lb) without ammunition
	207.0 kilograms (456.4 lb) when mounted on trailer
Rate of fire:	12 rounds/min
Crew:	4+1

== Operators ==
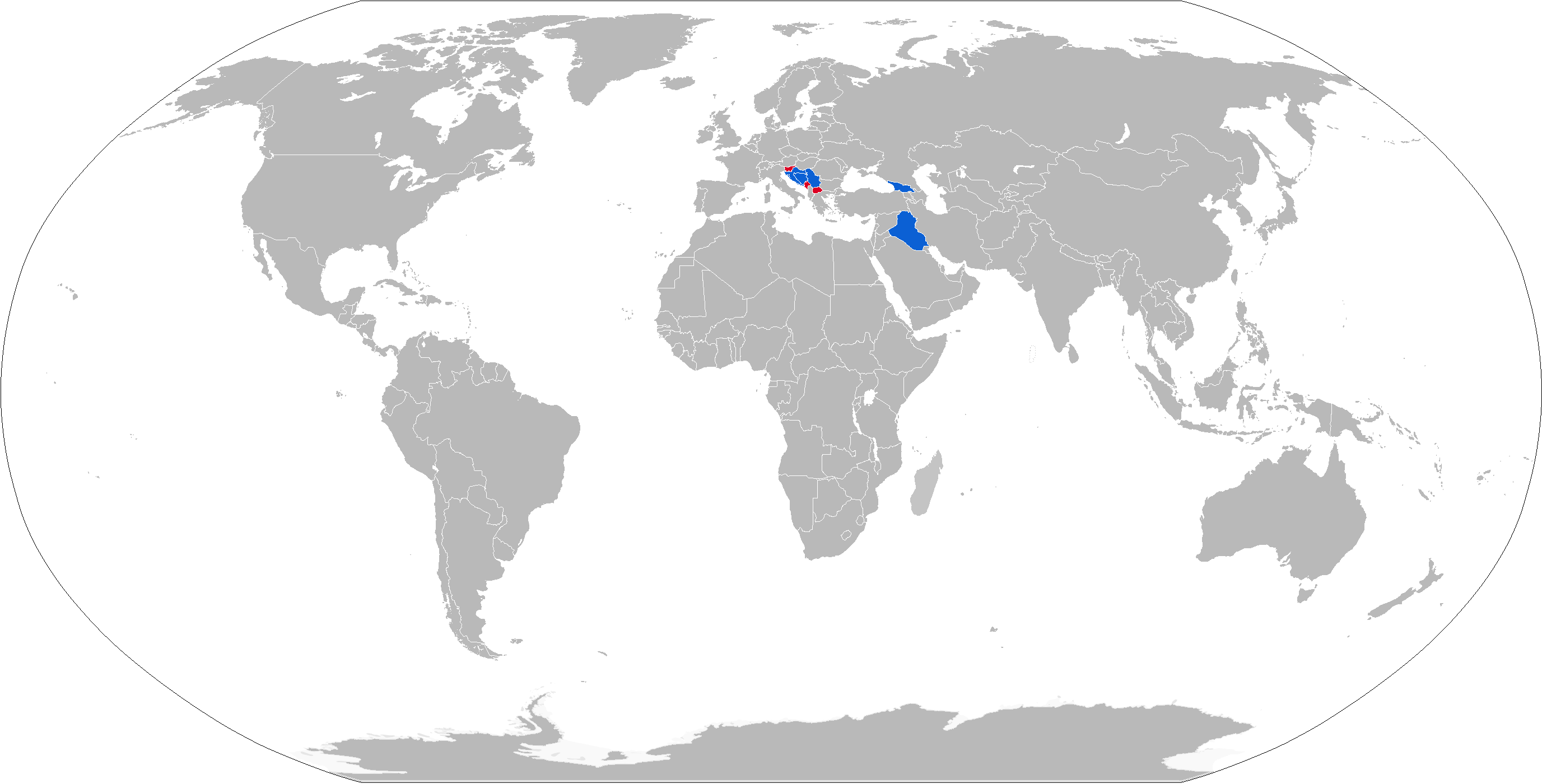
Map with M74 operators in blue with former operators in red

=== Current operators ===
- Iraq
- Libya
- El Salvador
- Serbia
- Slovenia

=== Former operators ===
- Artsakh − Seized by Azerbaijan after the 2023 Azerbaijani offensive in Nagorno-Karabakh
- Yugoslavia

== See also ==
- 120 KRH 92
- Light mortar 120mm M75
- Mortier 120mm Rayé Tracté Modèle F1
- Soltam K6
