= Military Technical Institute =

Serbian military institute

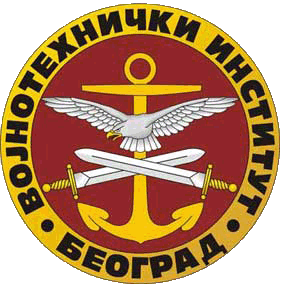
- Company type: R&D
- Industry: Defence and aerospace
- Founded: 3 November 1948; 77 years ago
- Headquarters: Belgrade, Serbia
- Products: Weapons; Missiles; Vehicles; Aircraft; Weapon upgrades
- Number of employees: ~500 (est.)
- Parent: Ministry of Defence
- Website: www.vti.mod.gov.rs

The Military Technical Institute (Serbian: Војнотехнички институт, romanized: Vojnotehnički institut; abbr. VTI) is a Serbian military scientific research institution, governed by the Ministry of Defence, which engages in research and development (R&D) for the production of new weapons systems, as well as the modernization of legacy military equipment, for both branches of the Serbian Armed Forces—the Serbian Army and the Serbian Air Force and Air Defence.

The institute has 22 laboratories, and is situated on 212 acres (86 hectares), with 177,000 square meters of laboratories and office space, mostly in the Belgrade neighborhood of Žarkovo.

== History ==
Given the situation after World War II, the Federal People's Republic of Yugoslavia had a need to independently develop military technology and reduce its dependence on foreign suppliers. By a decision of the Secretary of Defense and a proclamation by Yugoslav president Josip Broz Tito, VTI was founded in 1948 as the Military Technical Institute of the Land Forces (Serbian: Vojnotehnički institut Kopnene vojske; abbr. VTIkov) in Belgrade.

In 1973, VTI was integrated with several smaller military research and development institutes. By 1992, it incorporated the dissolved Aeronautical Technical Institute in Žarkovo, and minor parts (located in Serbia) of the Nautical Institute (Serbian: Brodarski institut) from Zagreb, supposedly as an effort to reduce developing cost and maintenance. Since then, the institute has changed its name several times, reflecting the political changes in the country, the first of these being "Technical Institute of the Yugoslav Armed Forces".

== Projects ==
The institute works closely with the Serbian Armed Forces (including its Technical Testing Center) and Yugoimport SDPR in designing and testing new weapons systems.

VTI, together with its various predecessor institutes, has developed more than 1,300 weapons systems, not all of which have entered service. The following list includes weapons and systems of other companies in which VTI was partly involved in some stage of development, and those systems are listed with references. VTI was in charge of domestically-produced weapons systems under license, and the modification and modernization of such weapons with the introduction of new technologies and making new materials and tools for production. There are several new weapons developed from licensed products that surpass the originals in performance. One such example is the T-72, which was license-produced as the M-84.

=== Aircraft ===
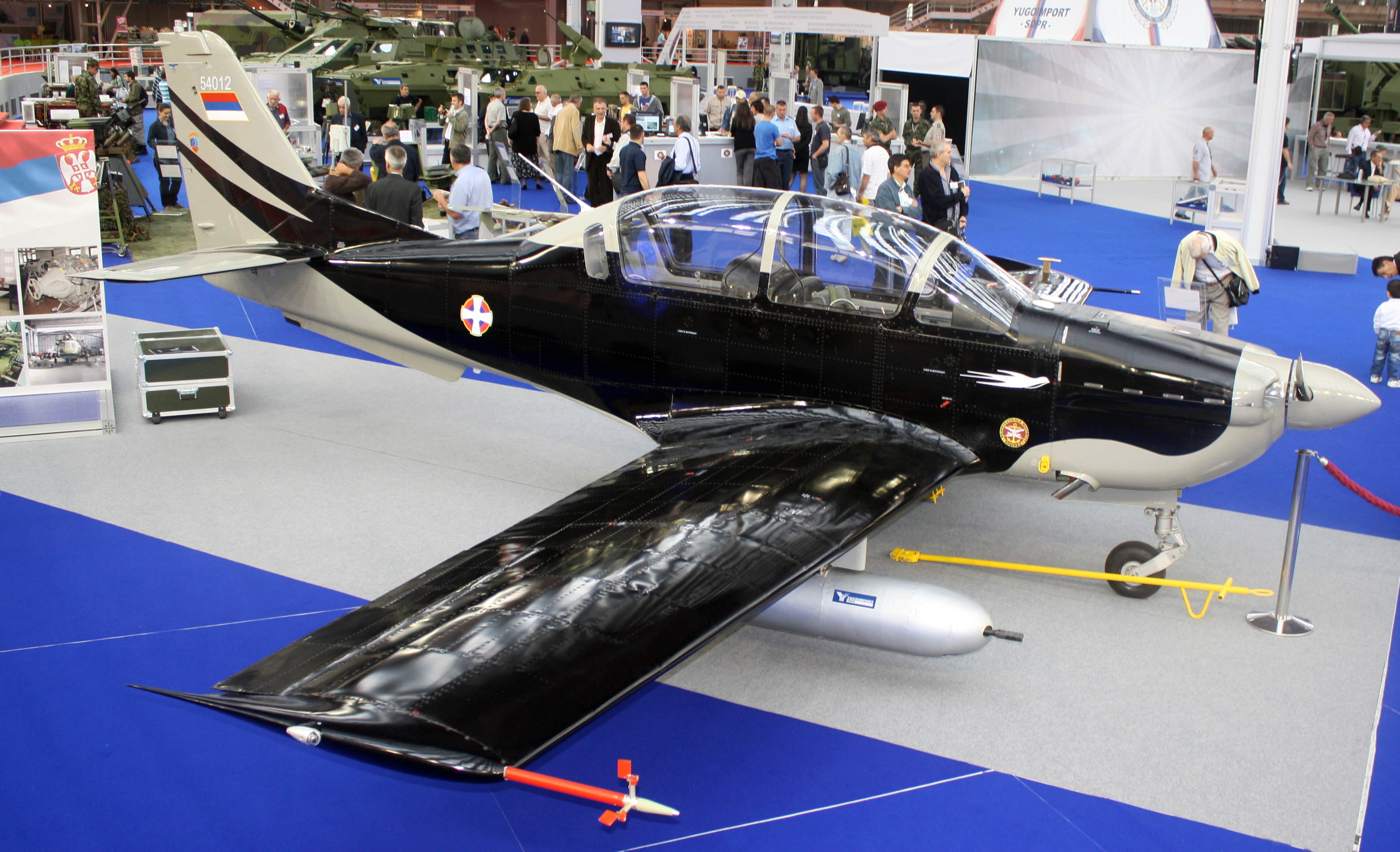
Utva Lasta 95

- Ikarus S-49 (developed by the Aeronautical Technical Institute)
- Soko J-20 Kraguj (developed by the Aeronautical Technical Institute)
- Soko G-2 Galeb (developed by the Aeronautical Technical Institute)
- Soko J-21 Jastreb (developed by the Aeronautical Technical Institute)
- Soko J-22 Orao (developed by the Aeronautical Technical Institute)
- Soko G-4 Super Galeb (developed by the Aeronautical Technical Institute)
- UTVA 75 (developed by the Aeronautical Technical Institute)
- Kobac
- Utva Lasta 95
- HN-45M Gama
- HN-45M Gama 2

=== Unmanned Aerial Vehicles ===
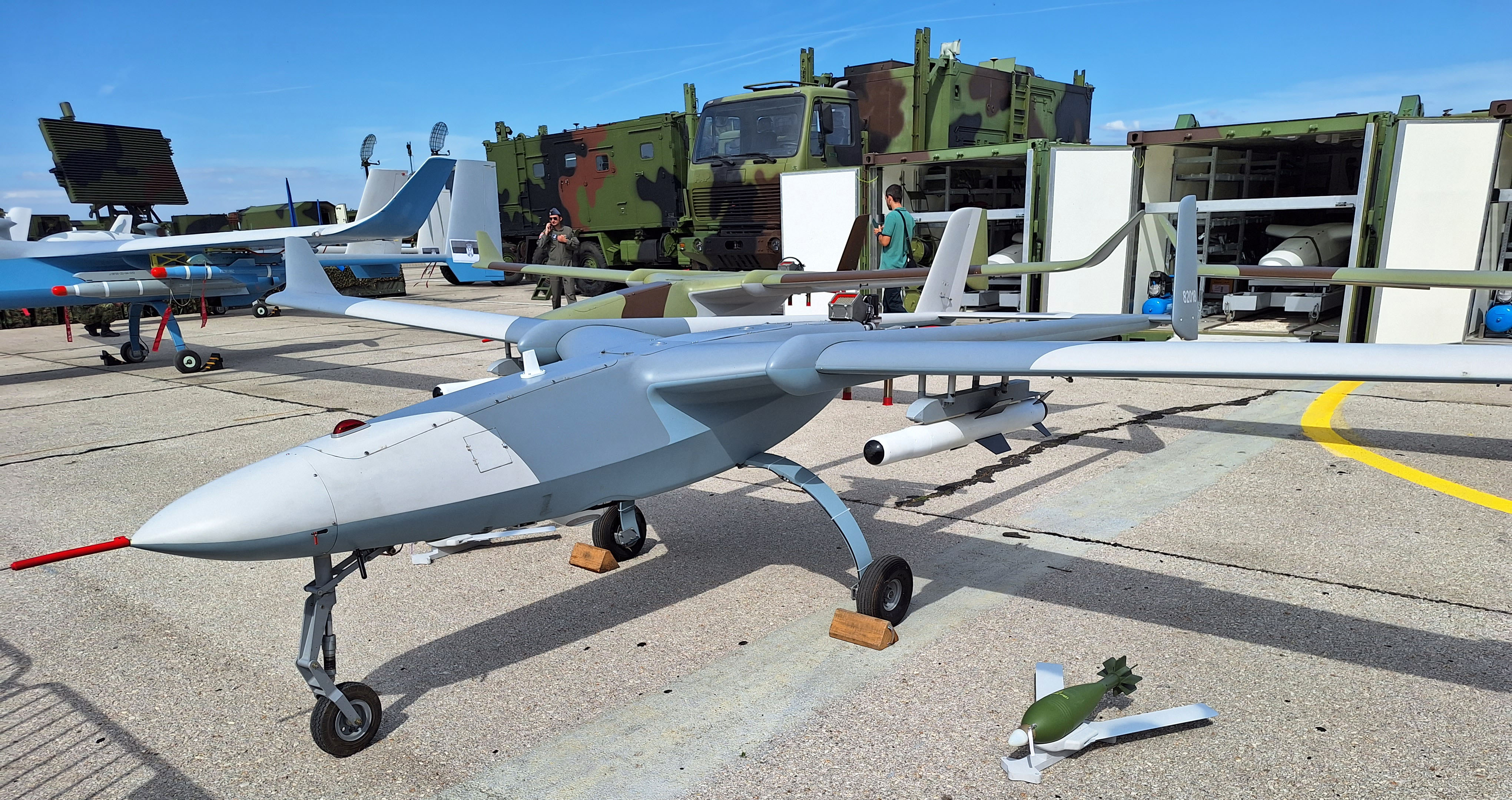
Pegaz combat drone

- Vrabac
- Pegaz

=== Unmanned Ground Vehicles ===
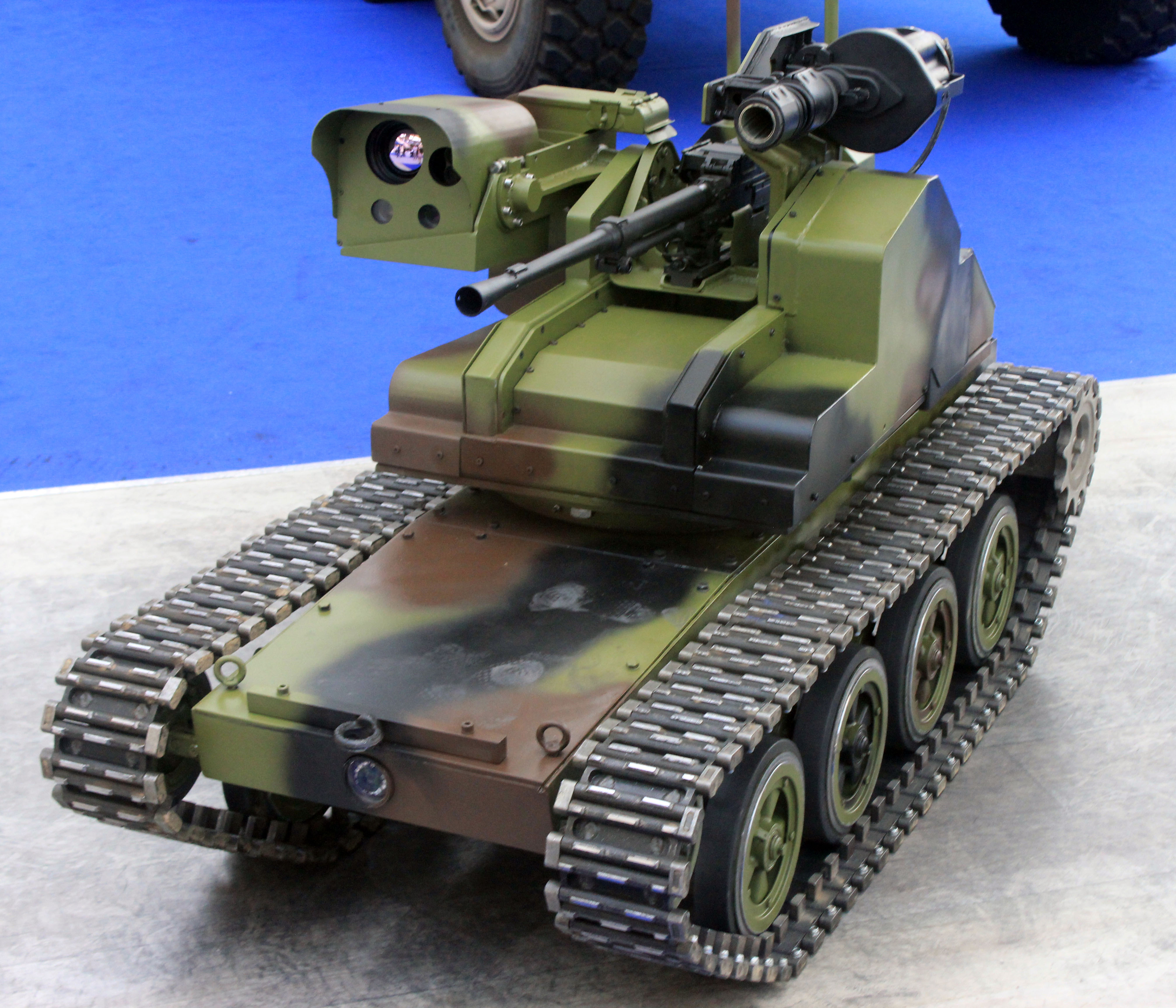
Mali Miloš

- Mali Miloš

=== Armoured Vehicles ===
==== Tanks ====
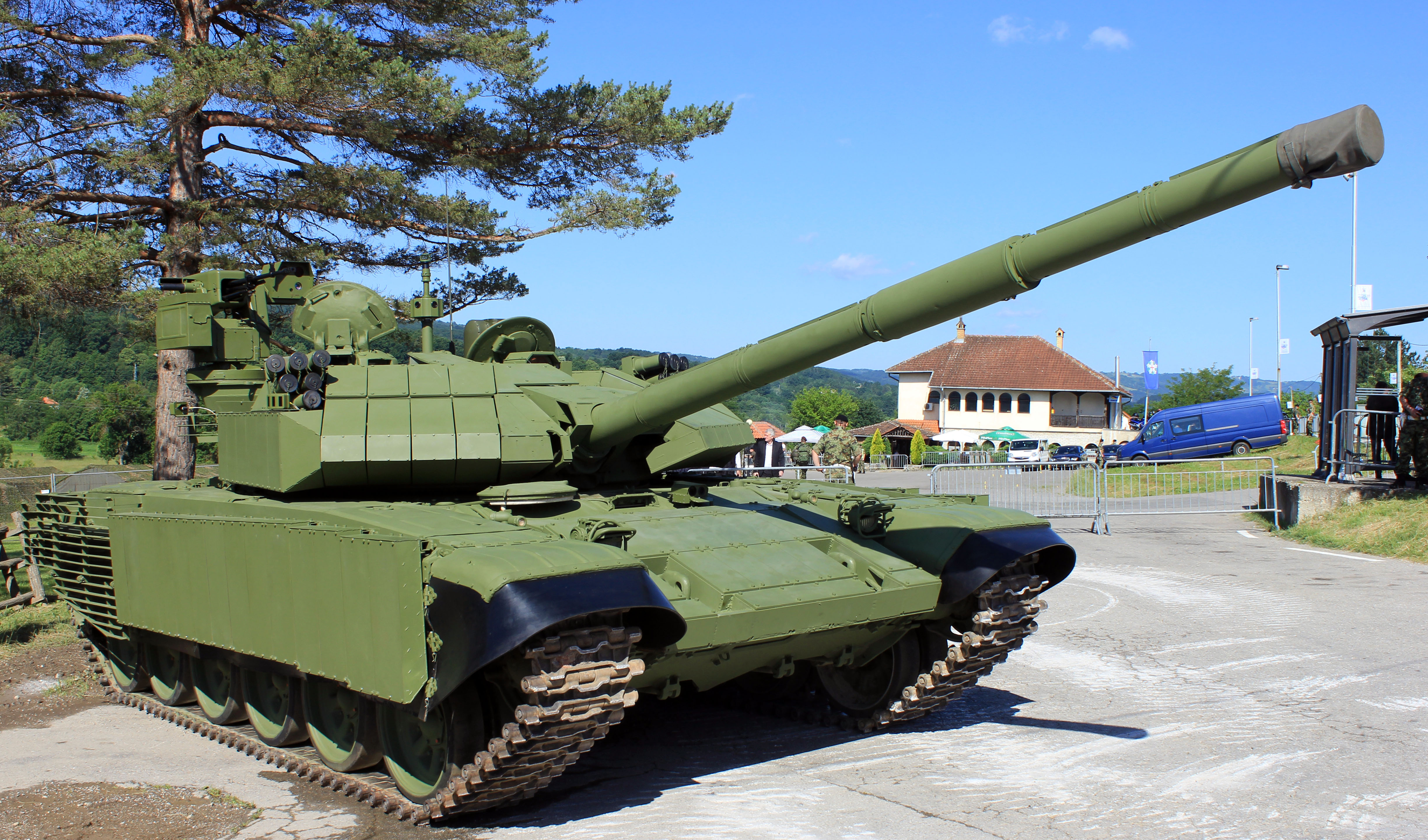
M-84AS1 tank

- M-84 and A/AB/ABN/ABK/AS/AS1/AS2/AS3 variants (1985–present)
  - M-84A – upgraded version similar to the Soviet T-72M1 but with a significantly more powerful engine and additional armour plating
  - M-84AB – Kuwaiti version of M-84A
  - M-84AB – M-84AB fitted with land navigation equipment
  - M-84ABK Command Tank – M-84AB version fitted with extensive communication equipment, land navigation equipment, and a generator for the command role
  - M-84AI armored recovery vehicle (Yugoslavia and Poland) – During the mid-1990s Kuwait requested an armored recovery vehicle variant of the M-84A tank as part of the deal to buy a large batch of M-84A tanks.
  - M-84AS – upgrade package of the M-84A
  - AS1/AS2/AS3 – additional armor added, including explosive reactive armor, integrated day-night sighting system with thermal imager, command information system, a soft-kill active protection system, new radio system, remote-controlled weapons station with 12.7mm machine gun, and CBRN protection equipment

==== Infantry Fighting Vehicles ====
- BVP M-80 (1979–present)
  - M-80A – improved version with 320 hp engine, full production
  - M-80A1 or SPAT 30/2 – improved version with a dual 30mm gun system called "Foka". Prototype only.
  - M-80A/98 – further improvements of M-80A1 with new "Vidra" turret
  - M-80A KC – company commander's vehicle
  - M-80A KB – battalion commander's vehicle
  - M-80A VK - turretless commander's vehicle
  - M-80A Sn – medical, no turret. Single oblong hatch in the roof and single rear door. Carries 4 stretcher patients or 8 seated patients.
  - M-80A LT – tank destroyer with six AT-3 launchers
  - Sava M-90 – SA-13 SAM version, designated Strela-10MJ
  - MOS – self-propelled mine layer
  - M-80AK/M-98A – new gun turret with 30 mm M86 cannon or 30 mm dual feed M89 cannon
  - M-80AB1 – advanced armour, turret gun control equipment, optronics package, smoke grenade launchers and the ability to mount and launch the upgraded 9M14 Malyutka missile variants

===== Armoured Personnel Carriers =====
- OT M-60 (1962-1979)
- BOV 4 x 4 (1980–present)
  - BOV VP
  - BOV M11
  - BOV M15
  - BOV APC
  - BOV KIV

===== Reconnaissance Vehicles =====
- BOV M11
- Kurjak

==== Air Defence Vehicles ====
- BOV 3
- BOV 30
- BOV AX Hybrid

===== Engineering Vehicles =====
- VIU-55 Munja (T-55 conversion)
- M-84AI

=== Artillery ===
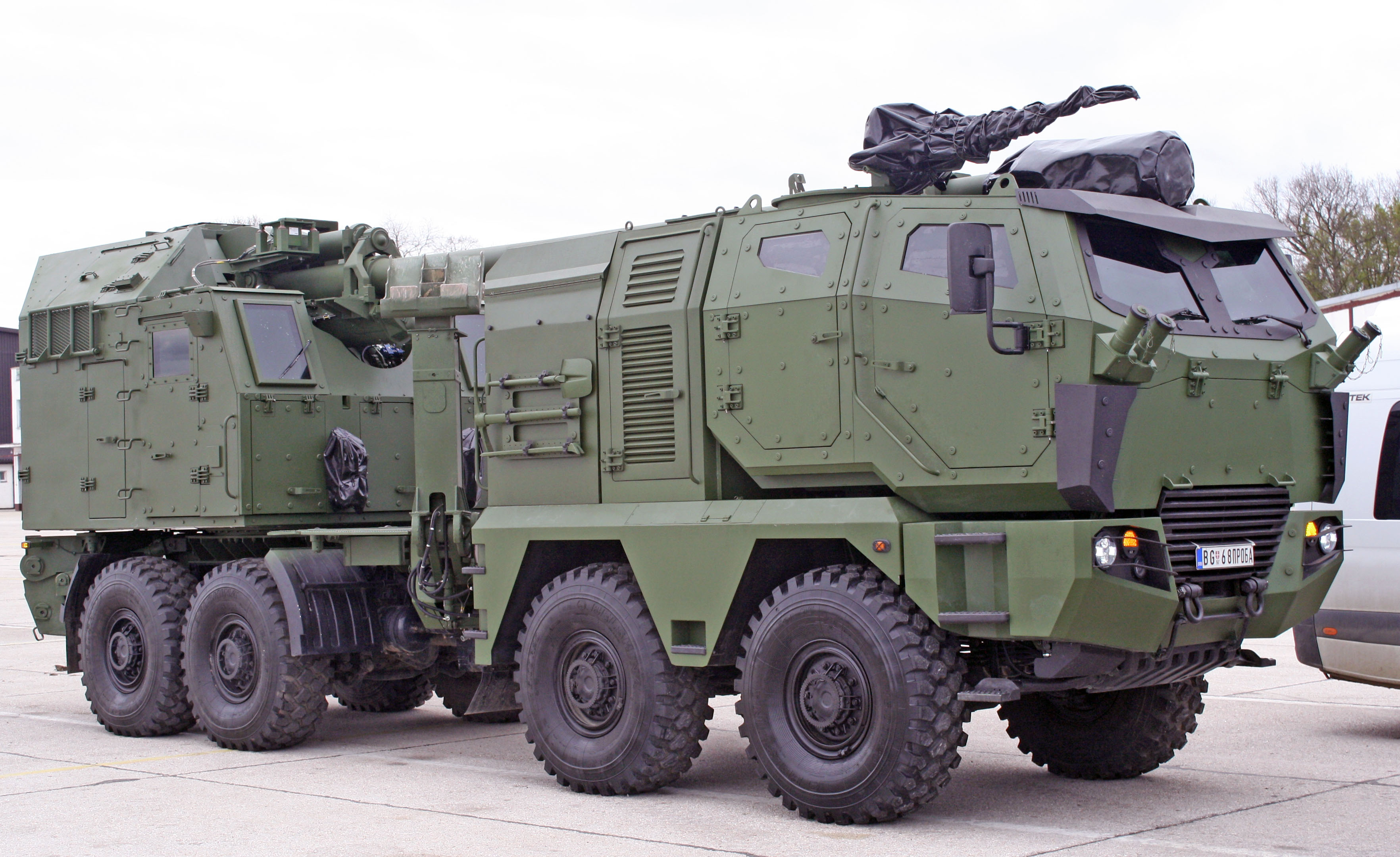
Nora B-52 self-propelled howitzer

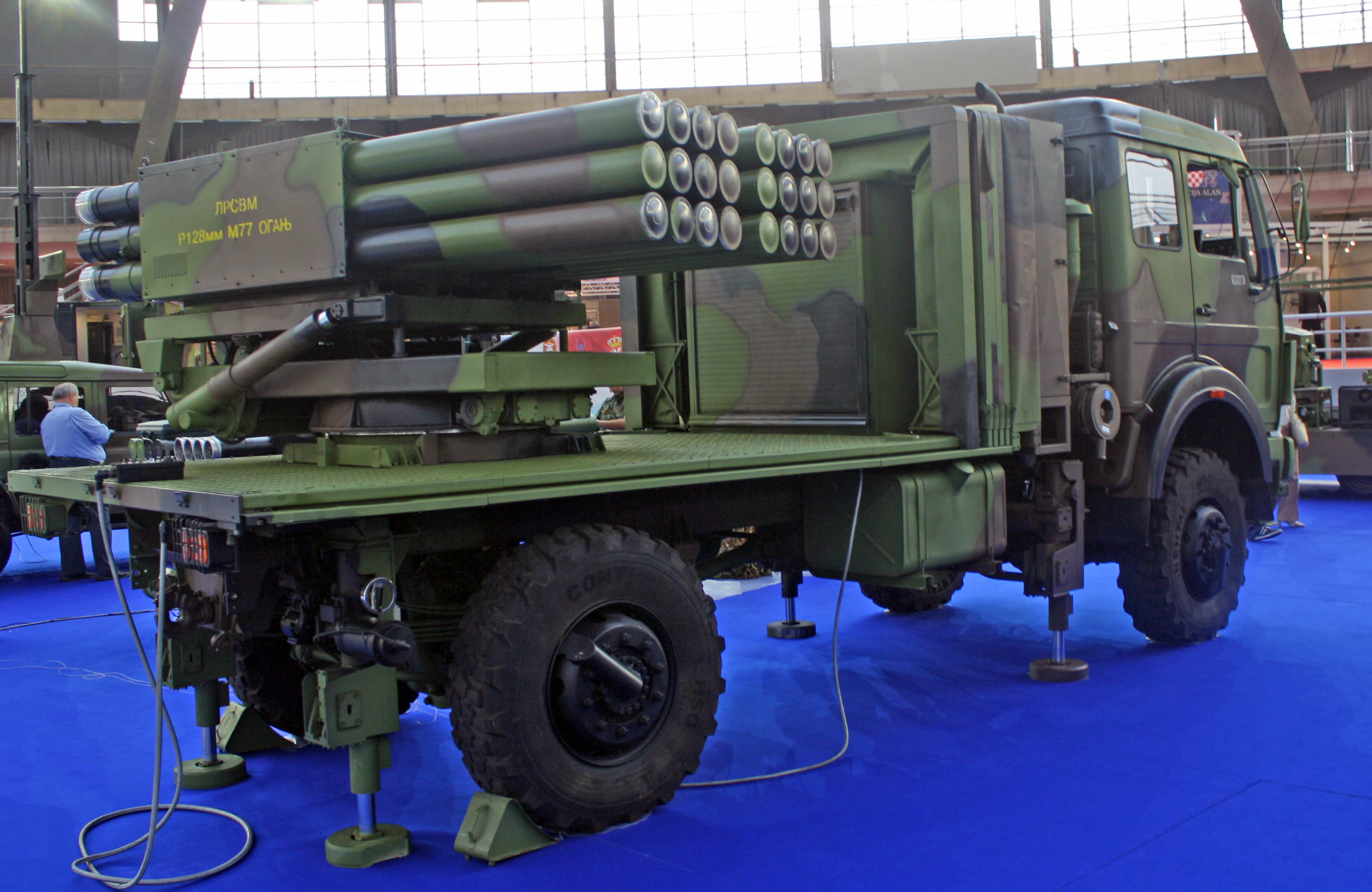
LRSVM Morava multiple rocket launcher

==== Field artillery ====
- Nora M-84
- M-56

==== Self-propelled artillery ====
- Nora B-52
- Sora 122mm

==== Multiple rocket launcher ====
- LRSVM Morava
- M-87 Orkan
- M-96 Orkan 2
- M-77 Oganj
- M-63 Plamen
- Nimr

==== Mortars ====
- M57 mortar
- Universal Mortar UB M52
- M74 light mortar
- M75 light mortar
- M95 mortar
- Mortar 60mm M70
- Mortar 60mm M95
- Mortar 60 mm M06C
- Mortar 82mm M69A

=== Anti-tank Weapons ===
- Bumbar
- M79 Osa
- M80 Zolja
- M90 Stršljen
- M-80A LT
- POLO M-83
- Malyutka-2T

=== Anti-Aircraft Weapons ===
- Sava M-90
- SPAT 30/2
- BOV-3
- BOV-30
- Strela 2M2J
- Sava
- Strela-10M

=== Mines and Mine layers ===
- Self-Propelled Minelayer MOS
- TMA–4
- TMRP–6

=== Military trucks ===
- FAP 1118
- FAP 2026
- FAP 2228
- FAP 3232
- FAP 3240
- Zastava NTV

=== Turrets, cupolas and RCWS ===
- M91
- M86
- M86/06
- M10 RCWS
- 12,7mm RCWS
- M20 RCWS

=== Missiles ===
==== Unguided missiles ====
- M-77
- Plamen A
- Plamen D

==== Air-to-surface missile ====
- Grom A
- Grom B
- LVBF-250

==== Surface to surface missiles ====
- Košava 1

=== Projectiles and large calibers ammunition ===
- 105mm HE ER-BB M02
- 105 mm HE ER
- 125mm APFSDS–T M88
- 155mm HEERFB–BB M03

=== Rifles, guns, sub-machine guns and snipers ===
- Zastava M19
- Zastava M21
- Zastava M97
- Zastava M97K
- Zastava M70

=== Radars ===
- PR15
- Žirafa M-85

=== Electronics, optoelectronic stations, fuzes, homing heads, sensors, etc ===
MIP 11, tv homing heads for guided missiles, laser homing heads for guided missiles, system for acoustic source localization - HEMERA, inertial guidance systems for missiles, explosive reactive armour M99, battery command and control system for Nora B-52, M07G mortar ballistic computer, tank engine protection from wrong start-up, system for automatic control and jamming of mobile telephony, radio jammers against remotely controlled improvised explosive devices, software packages for command and control of air defense assets from the command and control centers, MOMS surveillance-sighting system.

=== Upgrades modernization and modifications ===
Neva-M1T, SA-341, upgraded howitzer 105 mm M56/33, upgraded howitzer 105mm M101/33, upgraded BTR-50, modernization programs for the T-55 and T-72 family of tanks.

== Specialized laboratories ==
- Aerodynamics
- Spatial Forms and Lengths Measuring
- Experimental Modal Analysis, Vibration and Balancing Analysis
- Experimental Strength
- Experimental Ballistics
- Testing of Solid Propellant Rocket Motors
- Power-Generating Materials
- Servo-Systems
- Hardware in the Loop (HIL) Simulation and Telemetry
- Electro-Inertial Sensors
- NBC Protection
- Electromagnetic Compatibility
- Radio-Relay Systems and Multiplex Equipment
- Micrography
- Optoelectronics
- Guidance and Control
- Electric Power Devices

== Fairs and scientific-technical gatherings ==
Military Technical Institute regularly exhibits at Partner and IDEX military fairs as well as organizing OTEX scientific-technical gathering.

== Technical cooperation ==
Military Technical Institute cooperates with following overhaul institutes:

- Technical Overhaul Institute "Čačak" (Tehnički remontni zavod "Čačak")
- Technical Overhaul Institute "Đurđe Dimitrijević-Đura" (Tehnički remontni zavod "Đurđe Dimitrijević-Đura")
- Aeronautical Overhaul Institute "Moma Stanojlović" (Vazduhoplovni tehnički zavod "Moma Stanojlović")

== Documentary and publishing activity ==
Making of technical documentation, films and books represents an important part of VTI as publisher, it represents institute output and quantifier of more than sixty years involvement in R&D missions. The institute possesses technical documentation for over 1300 items of weaponry and defense equipment developed through institute history that are introduced in service in the armed forces. This documentation being intellectual property of MoD, it has an outstanding value and use for future projects.

== See also ==
- Defense industry of Serbia
