= M-84AS =

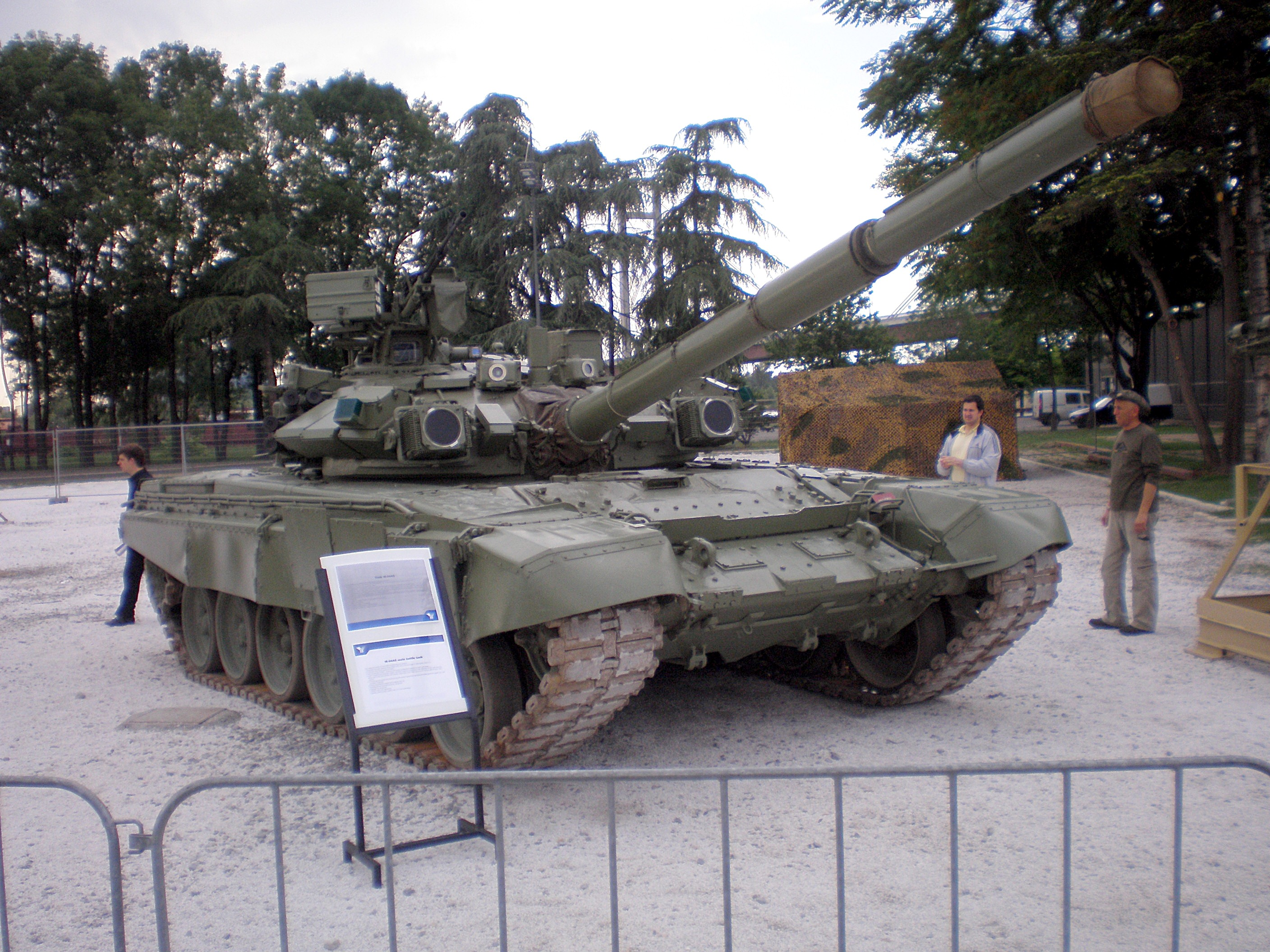
- M-84AS
- Type: Main battle tank
- Place of origin: Serbia

Production history
- Designer: Military Technical Institute
- Designed: 2004
- Manufacturer: Yugoimport SDPR
- No. built: 3

Specifications
- Mass: 45 tonnes
- Length: 9.53 m
- Width: 3.73 m
- Height: 2.23 m
- Crew: 3 (commander, gunner, driver)
- Armor: cylindrical pad, high-hardness steel, titanium, aluminium, tungsten, NERA plus modular Kontakt-5, Shtora
- Main armament: 125 mm 2A46M smoothbore gun and a 9M119 Svir
- Secondary armament: 7.62 mm M86 coaxial machine gun, 12.7 mm M87 anti-aircraft machine gun
- Engine: diesel V-46TK; 1,200 hp
- Power/weight: 26.7 hp/tonne
- Suspension: torsion bar
- Operational range: 700 km
- Maximum speed: 75 km/h

The M-84AS prototype main battle tank is a modernized version of the M-84. M-84AS, sometimes referred to as M-84AB1 and M-2001, failed to advance to serial production.

== Design ==
The modernization gives an improved fire-control system with integrated day/night sight. The M84A1 gun is replaced with a similar but improved gun which, along with better control characteristics, enables easy and fast field replacement of the barrel. The M-84AS tank is able to fire 9M119M Refleks anti-tank guided missiles with laser guidance through the barrel, which enables accurate engagement of enemy tanks up to 5 km.

The M-84AS is equipped with imported Shtora-1 and Kontakt-5 that both enhance survivability of a tank. Kontakt-5 is an explosive reactive armor package (ERA) which offers improved protection against modern tandem charge warheads and kinetic energy penetrators compared to the earlier Kontakt-1. It is also equipped with the modern Shtora electro-optical system for defense against wire and laser guided anti-tank missiles. The new turret will provide protection against Kinetic Energy (RHAe) anti-tank guided missiles. Its new 9M119 Refleks is a laser beam riding guided anti-tank missile designed to penetrate 900 mm of RHA. Since this version has not entered serial production for Serbian army new more modern version M-84AS1 is developed that will enter serial production.

Apart from external differences to the M-84, it also has different internal structure and equipment, far surpassing the M-84AB in both capability and durability. Developed originally from the M-84, the M-84AS is more than just a quick tweak to bring it up to standard. Many improvements were adopted from what can be argued to be its sister tank, the T-90S. With slight differences in armour and maneuverability; the T-90S is better armored while the M-84AS is faster and more maneuverable. Considering the speed perspective, the M-84AS moves at 75 km/h on road while the T-90S moves at 60 km/h on road with off-road speeds varying according to terrain. The armor on the T-90S is somewhat superior with thicker composites, NBC protection as well as having the option of Active Protection System and KMT mine sweeping systems. Aside from the propulsion and armor, the targeting system is equivalent.

== See also ==
- M-84
- M-84AS1/2/3
