= Universal Mortar UB M52 =

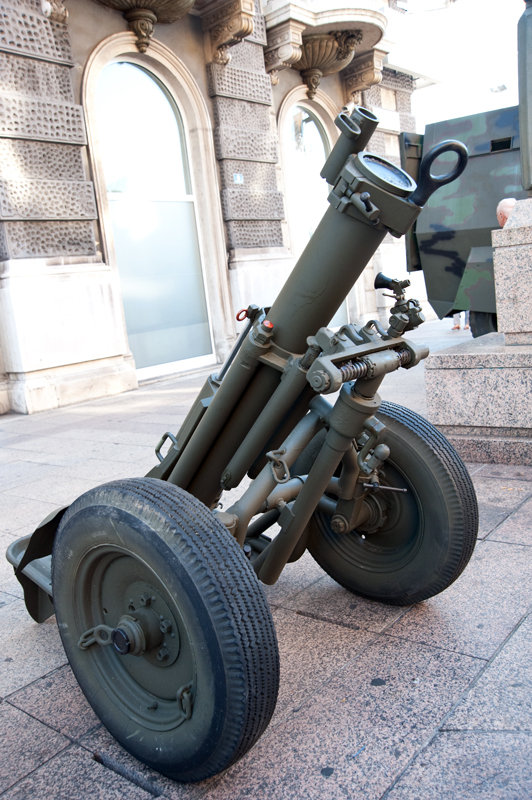
- Type: Mortar
- Place of origin: Serbia, Yugoslavia

Service history
- Wars: Salvadoran Civil War; Yugoslav Wars

Production history
- Designer: Military Technical Institute
- Designed: 1948-1951
- Manufacturer: PPT Namenska
- Produced: 1952

Specifications
- Mass: 378.0 kg (833.3 lb) on field
- Length: 2.250 m (7.38 ft) on march
- Crew: 5
- Caliber: 120 millimetres (4.7 in)
- Rate of fire: 25 RPM max
- Effective firing range: 6,100 metres (6,700 yd) with light shells
- Maximum firing range: 7,460 metres (8,160 yd) with heavy shell
- Feed system: manual

The Universal Mortar UB M52 is a 120 mm (4.75 inch) mortar that was developed by Military Technical Institute, in former Yugoslavia. It is long-range heavy mortar developed from the Soviet M1938 mortar but with integral wheels carriage.

== Design overview ==
First development versions prior UB M52 are known under designation BB-3, brdski bacač 3 (Serbian: брдски бацач, lit. 'mountain mortar'). The Universal Mortar UB M52 is developed from 1948 to 1951 and fires fin-stabilized ammunition from a smoothbore barrel. It is first mortar with capabilities to fire with wheels mounted. It has hydraulic muzzle attached to barrel to reduce pressure. M52 because of its weight require trucks or other vehicle to move them to battlefield, but compared to field artillery it is lighter. It can be deployed on battlefield in less than a minute.

=== Variants ===
M52 has 4 variants:

- basic variant M52
- improved variant M52A1 - reduced weight with some smaller parts, used rubber instead of leather for parts, new hydraulic fluid
- improved variant M52A2 - has one cylinder less with improved muzzle
- improved variant M52A3 - new hydraulic fluid with included fluid level indicator
- improved variant M52A4 - pneumatic tires.

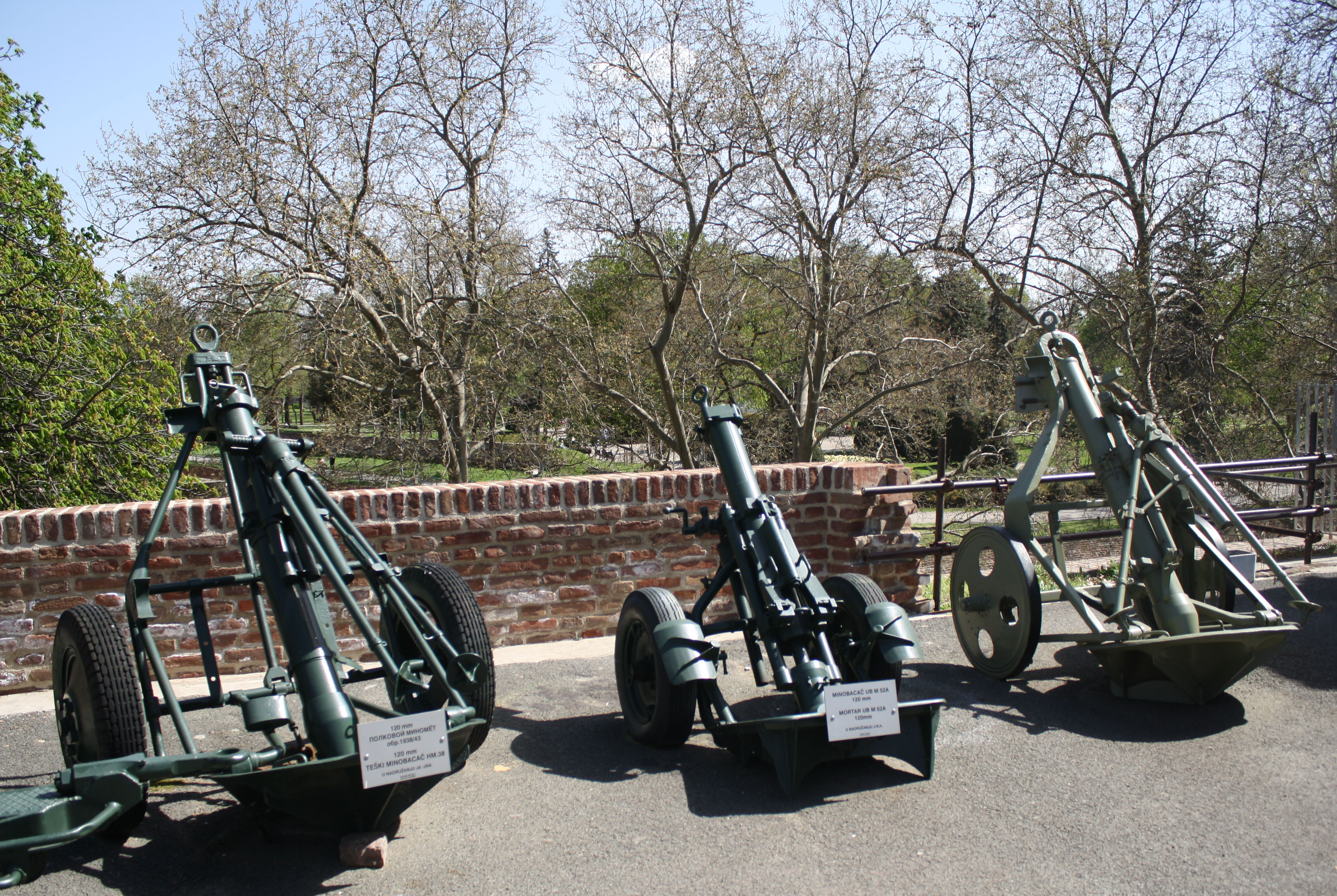
M52A in Kalemegdan fortresses open museum

== Deployment ==
Universal Mortar UB M52 was in service with the Yugoslav People's Army since 1952. After dissolution of Yugoslavia it is passed on successor states. It is exported to numerous countries and produced in few thousand pieces.

The M52 was transported with horses, TAM-4500, Pinzgauer 710M and many or other vehicles capable to attach trailer.

== Specifications ==
Maximum range:	6,100 metres (20,000 ft) with light shell - 7,460 metres (24,480 ft) with heavy shell
Minimum range:	195 metres (640 ft) with heavy shell
Weight:	378.0 kilograms (833.3 lb) without ammunition
	400.0 kilograms (881.8 lb) when mounted on trailer
Rate of fire:	25 rounds/min first minute
Crew:	5

The M52 is capable of firing the following munitions:

- High explosive shells
  - HE mortar shell M62P8
  - HE mortar shell Mk12P1
  - HE mortar shell Mk12P1-L
- Illumination shells
  - Illumination mortar shell M87P1
  - Illumination mortar shell M01
- Smoke shells
  - Smoke mortar shell M64P2
  - Smoke mortar shell M64P3
  - Smoke mortar shell Mk12
  - Smoke mortar shell M89
- Practice shells
  - Practice mortar shell M63P2

and other shells in 120mm in accordance with barrel pressure.

== Operators ==
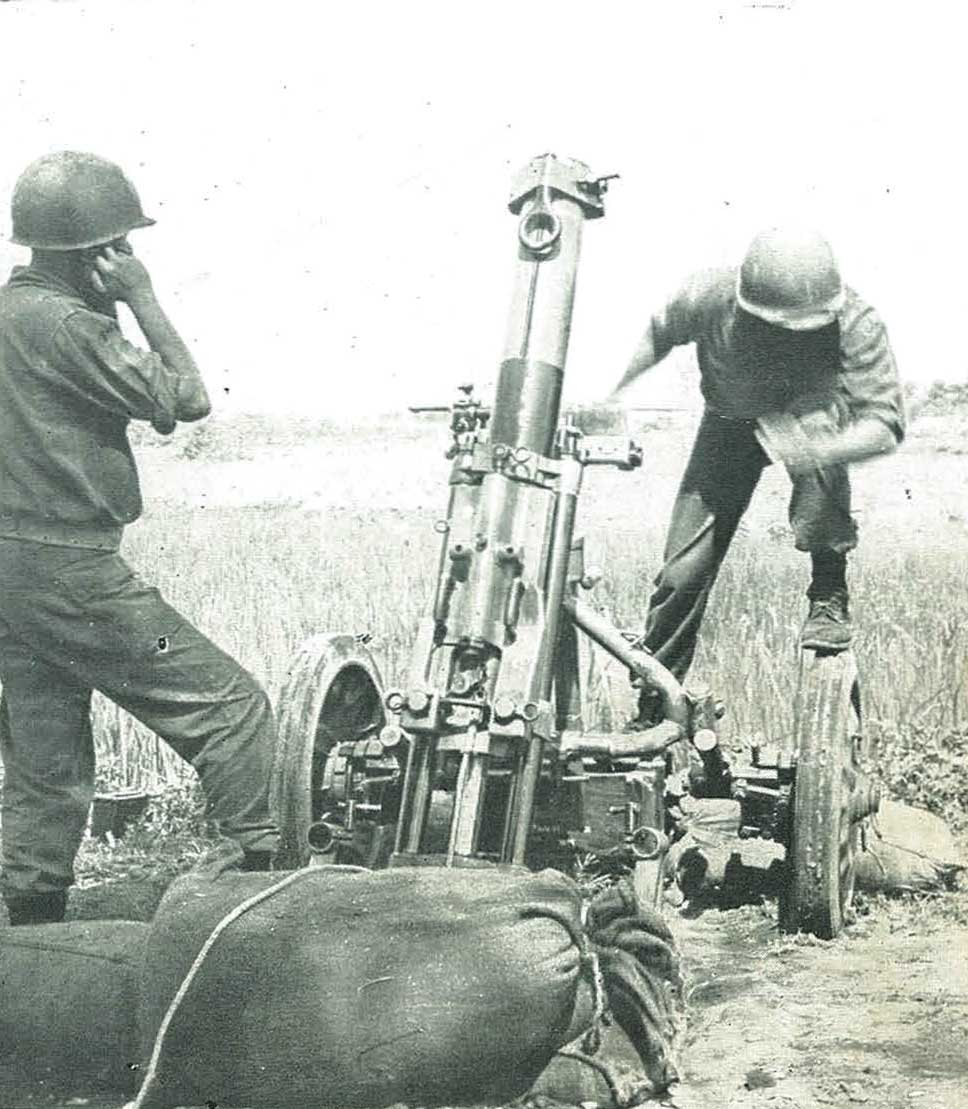
Indonesian marines during training with an UB M52

- Bangladesh: 95 as of 2020.
- El Salvador: In reserve.
- Macedonia
- Myanmar: 25 UBM-52 in service. Received from Yugoslavia in 1971.
- Serbia: In reserve, some in museum.
- Slovenia: In reserve.

=== Former operators ===
- Bosnia and Herzegovina
- Croatia: Sold or in museums.
- Indonesia: Indonesian Marine Corps
- Montenegro: Offered for sale.

== See also ==
- M1938 mortar
- Soltam M-65
