= M-56 Howitzer =

M-56 howitzer
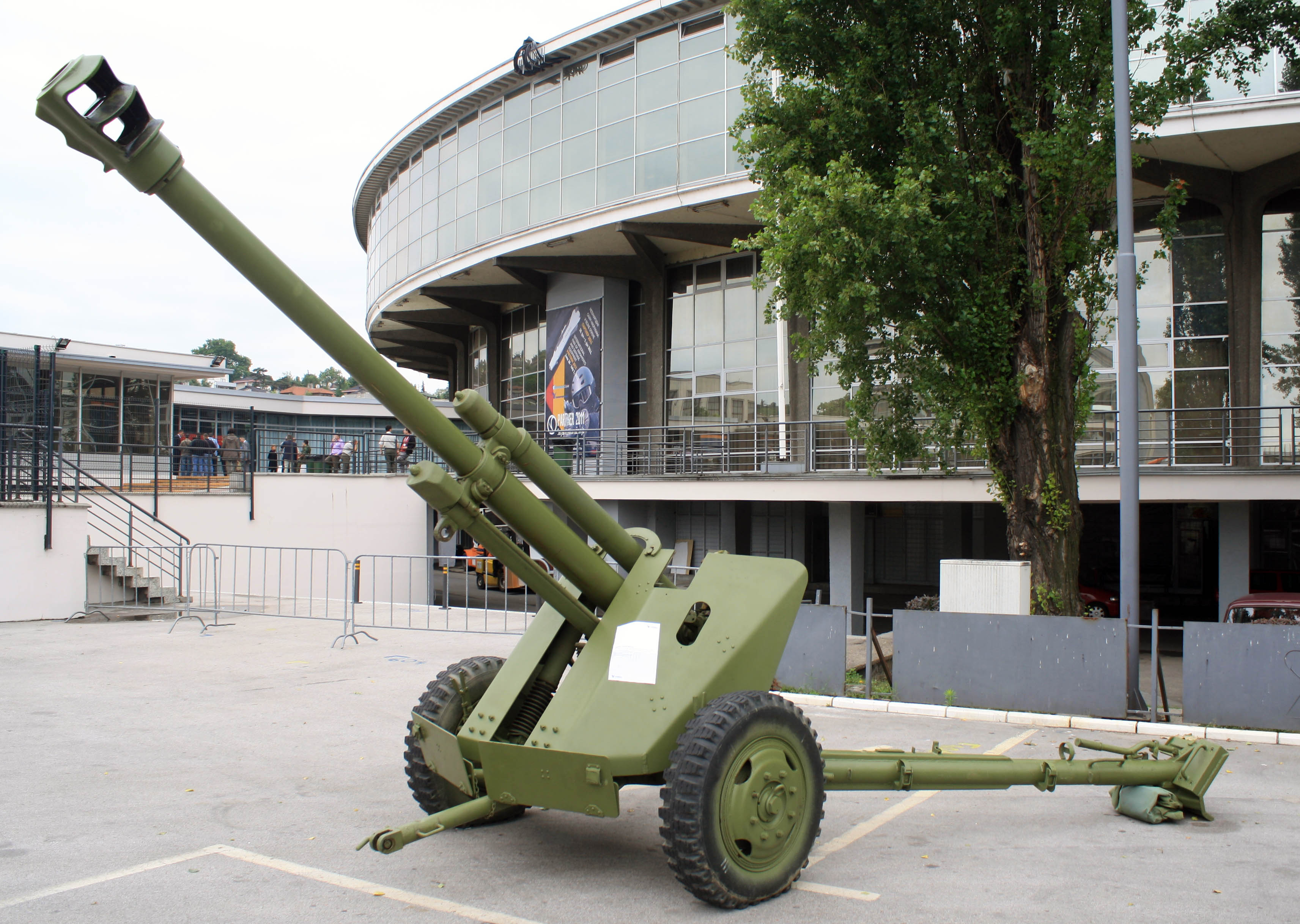
- M-56А1 105 mm howitzer on display at 2011 Partner military fair
- Type: M56 M56A1 Howitzer
- Place of origin: Yugoslavia

Service history
- In service: 1956

Production history
- Designer: Military Technical Institute
- Manufacturer: Yugoimport SDPR, Bratstvo Novi Travnik
- Produced: 1952–present
- No. built: more than 1,500 towed

Specifications
- Mass: 2,100 kg (4,600 lb) towed M56, 2370 M56A1
- Crew: 7 towed
- Shell: separate loading, cased charge
- Caliber: 105 mm (4.1 in)
- Elevation: −9 to +65 degrees
- Rate of fire: 6–8 rds/min
- Maximum firing range: M-56 with Special charge: 13.1 km (8.1 mi); M56-A1 33 caliber HE-ER BB: 18.1 km (11.2 mi) 30km with 52 caliber gun and HE ERFB/BB projectile
- Feed system: manual

The M-56 Howitzer is a 105 mm artillery gun from Serbia and Bosnia and Herzegovina. Early towed version is comparable to the German 10.5 cm leFH 18 and the American M101 howitzer while newer M-56A1 and self propelled M-09 Soko has more improvements and greater range.

== History ==
The gun's design is based on the M101 and leFH 18. The gun's initial model was the SH-1, designed by the Military Technical Institute Belgrade, Yugoslavia, in 1951. It was produced by Crvena Zastava in Kragujevac, now Zastava Arms. Second prototype, also developed by Military Technical Institute Belgrade, in 1955 designated as SH-2 was basis for serial M-56. Serial production started in 1956 Bratstvo Novi Travnik because prior to that in 1945 decision was made by communist government of Socialist Federal Republic of Yugoslavia to move factories from Serbia to other parts of newly formed Yugoslavia in order to develop their industries. Because of that decision in 1951 Zastava Arms factory, then called Crvena Zastava, was partially dissembled (including complete Crvena Zastava factory artillery program with calibers over 20 mm) and together with 250 experts was transferred to Bosnia into new Bratstvo Novi Travnik factory from then Socialist Republic of Serbia to Socialist Republic of Bosnia and Herzegovina to help in Bosnia development at cost of Serbia who in that time was heavy industrialized and had educated technical staff. The original production version was 28 caliber with a maximum range of 13 km.

=== Technical data M-56 ===
- M-56 caliber 28
- Weight: Between 2,190 kg
- Min. reach: 2,000m
- Max. reach: up to 14 km
- Muzzle brake: Double
- Min. elevation: −180 mils
- Max. elevation: 1200 mils
- Horizontal limits: 462 thousandths
- Frequency of fire: 6 round/min
- Range M-56: 13.1 km

== Later development ==
MTI developed the M56A1 version, with a longer 33 caliber barrel designed to last for at least 18,000 shots, with a stronger breechblock, with recoil systems that allow it to fire modern rounds up to 18 km and a hydro-pneumatic balancer. The M-56A1 and M09 Soko Self-propelled artillery are offered by Yugoimport and the M-56 by BNT TMiH in Bosnia.

=== Technical data M-56A1 105mm ===
- M-56A1 caliber 33
- Weight: 2,370 kg
- Min. reach: 2,000 m
- Max. reach: up to 18.5 km
- Muzzle brake: Double
- Min. elevation: −180 mils
- Max. elevation: 1200 mils
- Horizontal limits: 462 thousandths
- Frequency of fire: 6–8 round/min
- M-56A1: 18.1 km
- Length of barrel: 3,500 mm

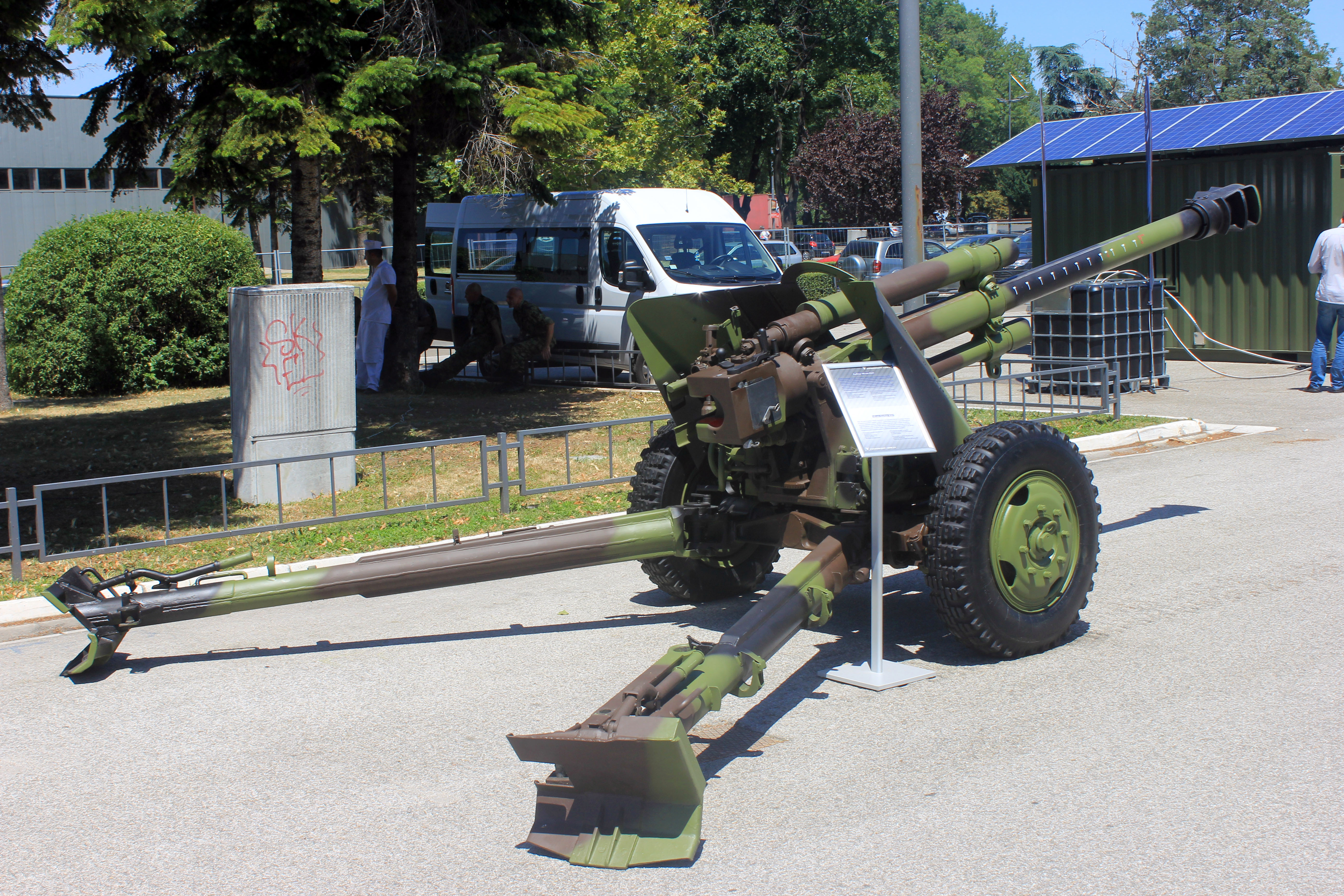
M56A1 105 mm howitzer in Partner 2017

=== M-09 Soko 105 mm self-propelled gun ===
M09 SP
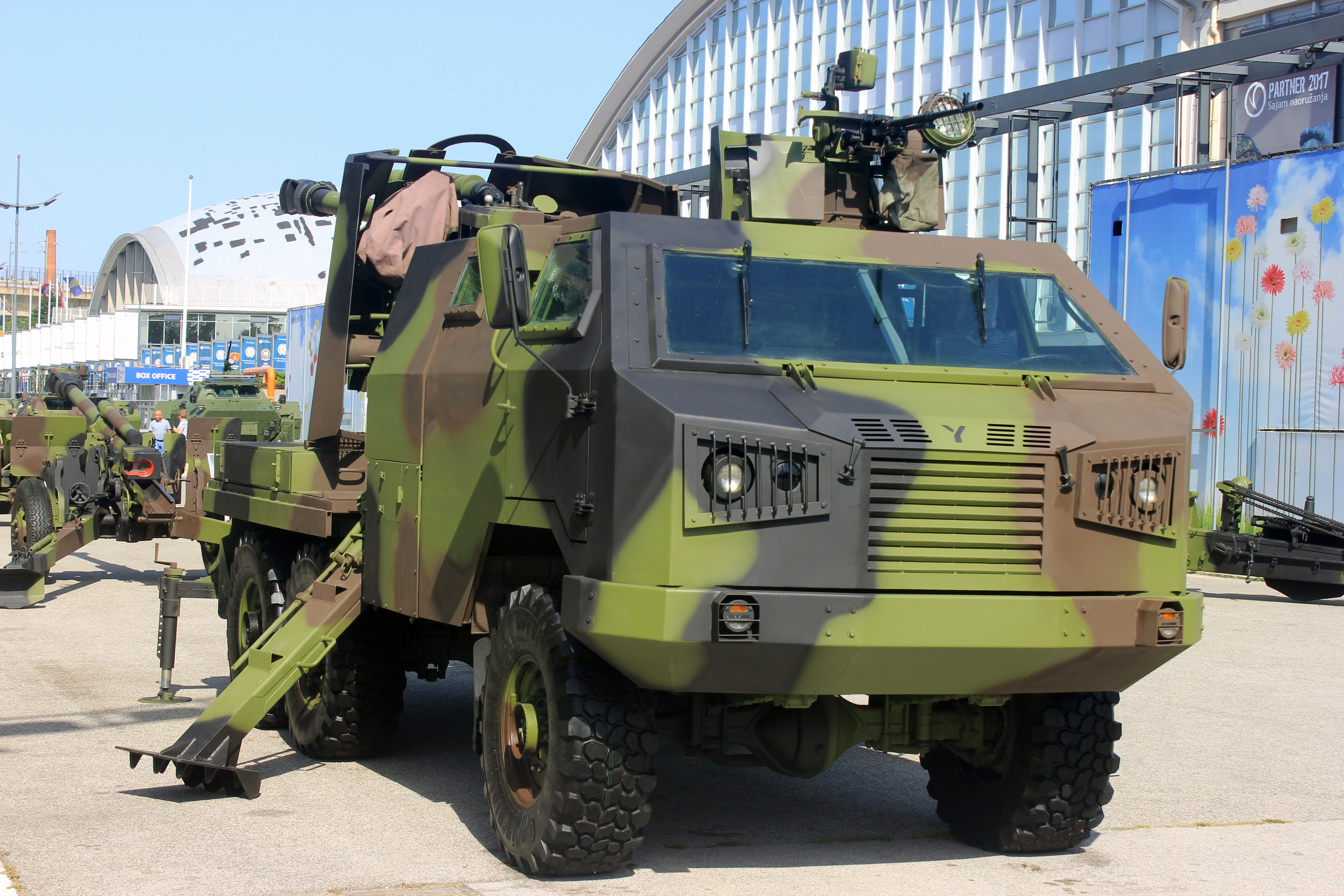
- M09 SP
- Type: Self-propelled artillery
- Place of origin: Serbia

Production history
- Designer: Military Technical Institute Belgrade
- Manufacturer: Complex Battle System factory in Velika Plana, Serbia
- Unit cost: $0.2 million estimated
- No. built: 2

Specifications
- Mass: 11400 kg
- Length: 6550 mm
- Width: 2275 mm
- Height: 2820 mm
- Crew: 5
- Elevation: −3° to +65°
- Traverse: 62°
- Rate of fire: 6–8 projectiles per minute.
- Maximum firing range: 18 km (HE ER-BB)
- Armor: STANAG 4569 Level I
- Main armament: 105 mm/33-calibre
- Secondary armament: Zastava Arms M87 – 12.7×108 mm for M56A1 or 12.7mm RCWS can also be installed
- Engine: turbo diesel 150 hp
- Suspension: 4x4 off-road wheels
- Operational range: 600 km (370 mi), at a speed of 80 km/h (50 mph)
- Maximum speed: On-road: 85 km/h (53 mph); Macadam country road: 39 km/h (24 mph); Off-road: 24 km/h (15 mph). Speed is given for K-I version

The M-09 Self propelled 105 mm gun has direct and indirect shooting capabilities. It can carry up to 60 rounds. It can be mounted on various truck chassis including TAM, FAP, TATRA, KAMAZ and Mercedes models.

- Range: 15.1 km M02 HE ERBT 18.4 km M02 HE ERFB/BB
- Rate of fire: 6–8 rds/min
- Armour STANAG 4569 level I
- Zastava Arms M87 – 12.7×108 mm for defense
- Integrated fire control system
- An use ammunition developed for the US M101 and M-56A1 howitzer

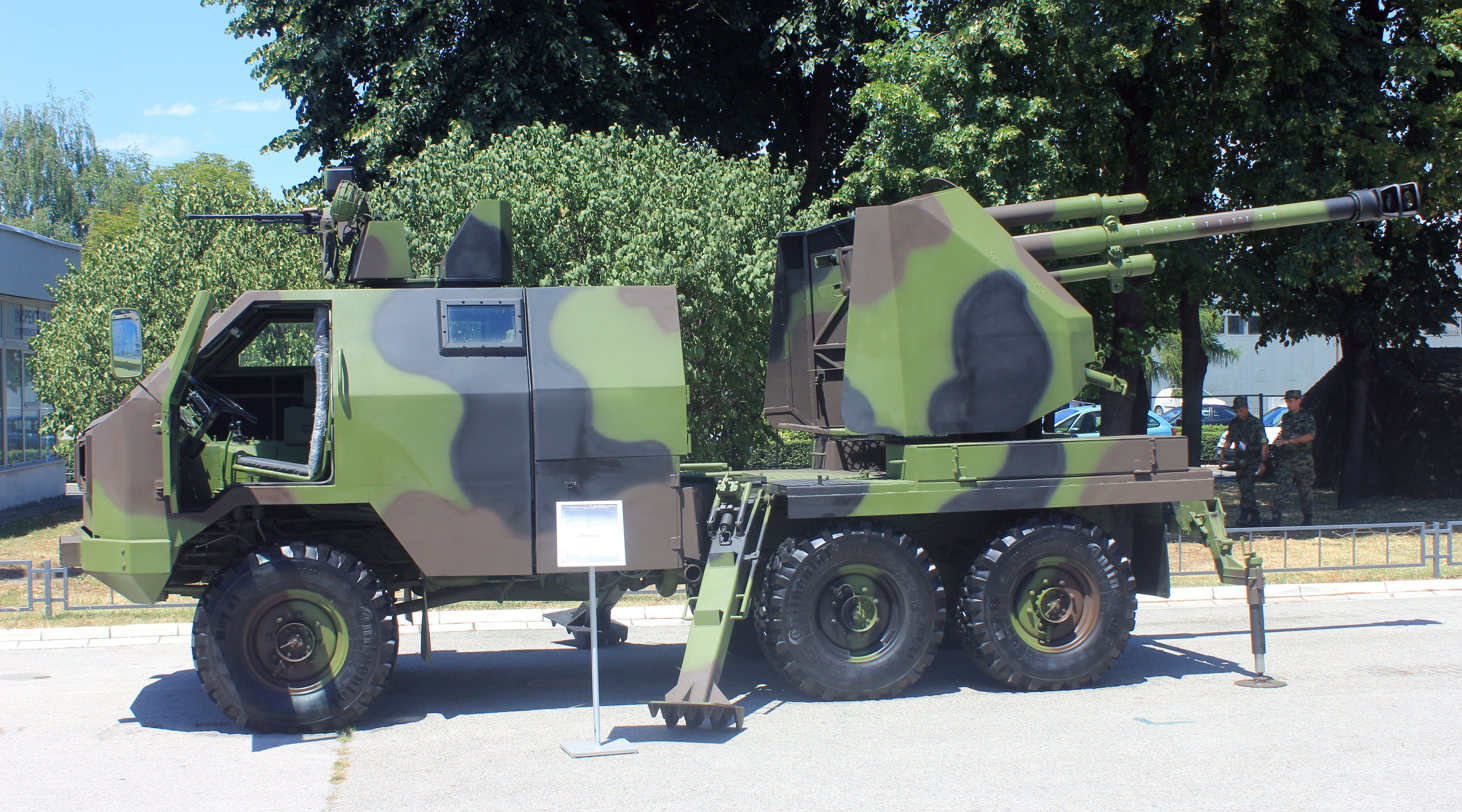
M09 Soko 105 mm howitzer in Partner 2017

== Users ==
According to the United Nations, some 1,500 units of the M56, in its various models, have been produced and over 200 were exported between 1998 and 2004.

=== Current operators ===
- Cyprus – 48
- El Salvador – 18
- Greece – 19
- Guatemala – 56
- India – 50
- Indonesia – 50
- Iran – 20
- North Macedonia – 14
- Mexico – 40 with the Army and 16 with the Naval Infantry Corps
- Myanmar – 250+
- Nigeria – 49
- Pakistan – 113
- Peru – 60
- Thailand – 12
- Venezuela – 18

=== Former operators ===
- Bangladesh – 56 as of 2016
- Bosnia and Herzegovina
- Croatia
- Iraq – fielded during the Iran–Iraq War and Persian Gulf War, former operator
- North Macedonia
- Serbia – 256 in 1998
