= Defense industry of Serbia =

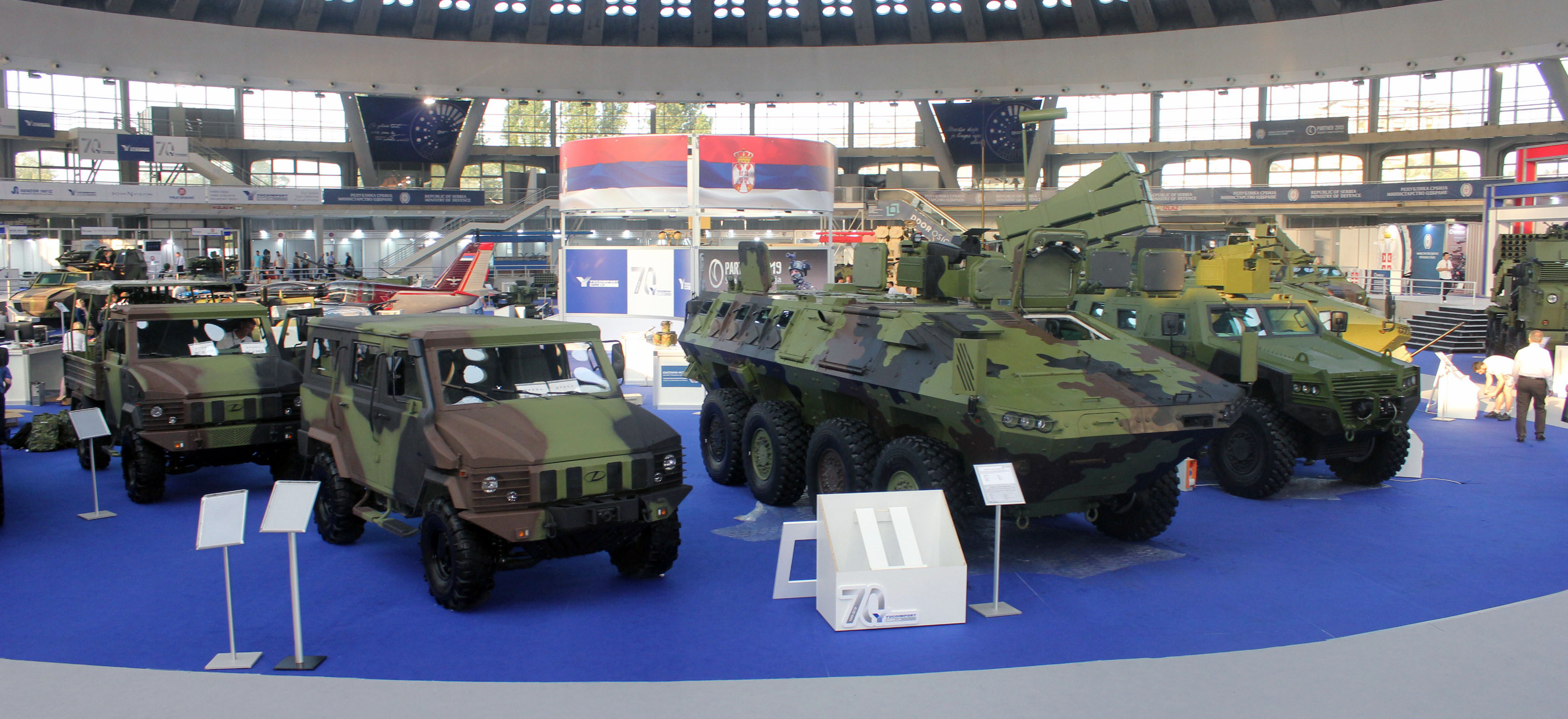
- Zastava NTV, Lazar 3, and BOV M16 Miloš
- Country: Serbia
- Licensed manufacturers: 63 (start of 2026)
- Production authority: Ministry of Defence
- Export-control authority: Ministry of Internal and Foreign Trade
- State industry grouping: Odbrambena industrija Srbije
- State defence integrator: Yugoimport–SDPR
- Principal R&D institution: Military Technical Institute
- Principal testing institution: Technical Testing Center
- Major defence exhibition: PARTNER
- Current export regime: National Security Council approval required since June 2025

The defense industry of Serbia is the largest in the Western Balkans. Serbia's export of weapons and military equipment in 2021 was valued at $1.23 billion (€1.13 billion). It consists of around 200 companies, both public and private, working in many different fields. Serbian defense companies closely cooperate with the Military Technical Institute, country's top-level military scientific research institution, in developing new weapons, as well as with Serbian Armed Forces' Technical Testing Center, using its services for testing of new defense products. Universities and colleges in Serbia also participate through various contracts with the companies.

== Legal framework ==
All Serbian manufacturers of defense equipment must abide to the Law on Manufacturing and Sale of Weapons and Defense equipment. There is a special permission for manufacturing defense material and manufacturers must meet many criteria in order to get a permit for manufacturing. There is also a special registry that all companies have to apply to in order to obtain permits for import or export defense products; as of 2018, 219 companies were registered for arms import-export.

== Education ==
There are several universities that have proper defense industry study programs, such as:

- Faculty of Mechanical Engineering, University of Belgrade
  - Department for Military Engineering
  - Department for Aerospace
- Faculty of Engineering, University of Kragujevac
  - Department for Military Industrial Engineering
- Military Academy of University of Defence

== Manufacturers ==
Production is performed in many companies, both public (state-owned) and private. There is a close cooperation between some of these in numerous projects.

=== Public ===
Public companies i.e. those that are state-owned are grouped into "Defence Industry of Serbia" holding (Serbian: Одбрамбена индустрија Србије, romanized: Odbrambena industrija Srbije).

Company	Portfolio	Average employees	Revenue (as of 2025, EUR)
Yugoimport SDPR	armored vehicles, artillery systems and defence trade	351 (1,520)	€346.7 million
Krušik	large-caliber ammunition (missiles, rockets, shells)	2,050	€157.1 million
Sloboda	large-caliber ammunition	1,751	€131.7 million
Milan Blagojević - Namenska	propellants and gunpowder	1,726	€108.5 million
Prvi Partizan	small-caliber ammunition	1,557	€102.2 million
Trayal	explosives, protective devices	1,201	€66.3 million
Yumco	uniforms, protective equipment	1,528	€55.3 million
Zastava Arms	firearms	2,324	€55.0 million
Prva iskra	explosives	170	€32.9 million
PPT Namenska	multiple rocket launchers, anti-aircraft systems, mortars, robots	700	€23.4 million
Zastava TERVO	off-road vehicles	238	€20.7 million
Teleoptik - žiroskopi	optics, gyroscopic and fire-control equipment	286	€15.5 million
Fabrika automobila Priboj	military and off-road trucks	164	€11.8 million
Total		14,046	€1.127 billion

Financial figures refer to individual legal entities and are based on annual financial statements filed with the Serbian Business Registers Agency (APR). The employee figures represent the average number of employees during the reporting year, while revenue figures represent total revenue (AOP 1043). Euro values are approximate conversions from Serbian dinars using the 2025 average exchange rate published by the National Bank of Serbia.

=== Private ===
Partial list of private companies includes:

- EDePro - rocket ammunition, UAV, seekers for IR guided missiles, engines for rockets and UAV
- Iritel - electronics, radars
- Tigar - NBC protection, tank and vehicle parts
- Proizvodnja Mile Dragić - uniforms, shoes, boots, personal protections etc.
- NB Inat - pistols, rifles and guns
- SovaNVision - electronics and optics
- Senzor Infiz - electronics, battery chargers, laser designations, ballistic computers
- Imtel komunikacije - portable radars, radar detectors, electronics
- PPT-TMO - mechanical parts for rifles, tanks, rockets
- Pneumatik flex - hydraulics for self propelled artillery and other vehicles
- Pneumo logic - acclimatization and ventilation systems for self propelled artillery and other vehicles
- Poliester - tubes for MANPADS
- VLATACOM - security systems, radars
- Ei-OPEK - ammunition fuzzes, multiple rocket launchers controllers and electronics
- FTN-IRAM-RT - radar spare parts, electronics for radar data acquisition and radar controllers
- Tehnoremont - combat vehicles overhaul
- Azimuth-DPS - combat vehicles overhaul, tank overhaul, T-55 modernization, combat wheeled vehicles production

== Fairs ==
Every two years international defense fair "Partner" is organized in Belgrade. Defense companies of Serbia participate at fair presenting its latest products.

== Sources ==
- "Serbia to invest some budget savings in defence industry - Prime Minister". Reuters. 20 April 2017.
- "Serbia is the biggest exporter of weapons in the region". Министарство трговине, туризма и телекомуникација.
- "Serbia celebrates arms industry revival". Financial Times. 23 March 2010.
