= M75 light mortar =

M75
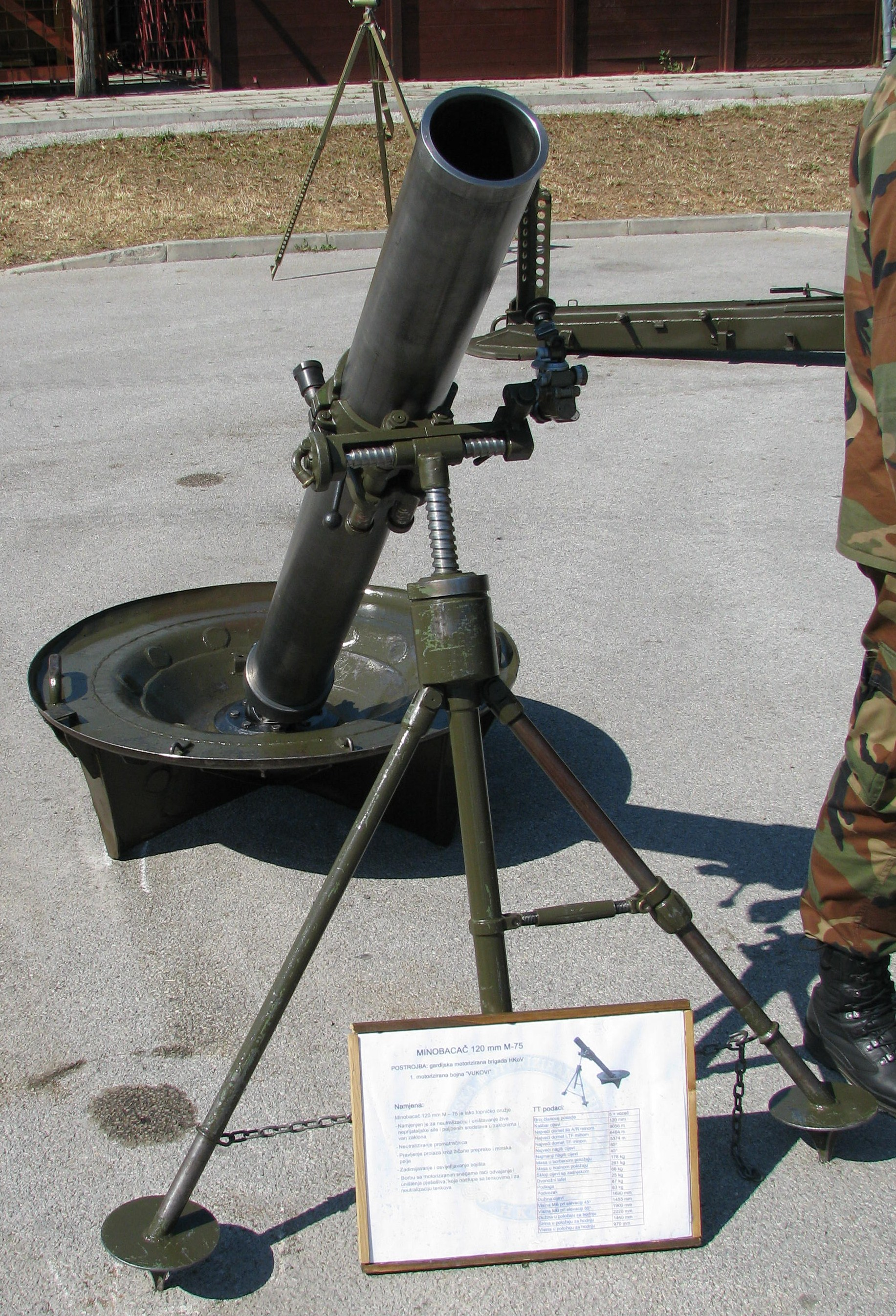
- Type: Mortar
- Place of origin: Yugoslavia

Service history
- In service: 1981–present
- Used by: see Operators
- Wars: Yugoslav Wars; Syrian Civil War

Production history
- Designer: Military Technical Institute
- Manufacturer: PPT Namenska

Specifications
- Mass: 177 kg for M75 in firing position 261kg in transport
- Crew: 5
- Caliber: 120 millimetres (4.7 in)
- Rate of fire: 15 rpm
- Effective firing range: 9,056 metres (29,711 ft) (M75 with rocket-assisted ammunition)
- Feed system: manual

The M75 is a Yugoslav 120mm mortar designed by the Military Technical Institute. It is a smoothbore, muzzle-loading, high-angle-of-fire weapon used for long-range indirect fire support. It is currently produced by the Serbian company PPT Namenska and the Bosnian company BNT.

== Description ==
The M75 can be deployed to provide fire support, for the destruction of enemy personnel and firing positions, for opening routes through barbed wire obstacles and mine fields, for demolition of fortified objects, for the destruction of infrastructure, illumination and for deploying smoke screens. The M75 has a rate of fire of 15 rounds per minute and can be used for sustained shelling. Mortars are considered to be very important arms as they are very effective and simple to use weapons deployed in a fire support role. The M75 requires only 30 seconds to be transferred from transport to firing position. Since it is light regarding its caliber, it can be easily airdropped and parachuted to firing position. It uses the NSB-4B sight for firing.

== Specifications ==
Maximum range:	9,500 metres (31,200 ft)
Minimum range:	297 metres (974 ft)
Weight:	178.0 kilograms (392.4 lb) without ammunition
	261.0 kilograms (575.4 lb) when mounted on trailer
Rate of fire:	15 rounds/min first minute, 9 rounds/min sustained
Crew:	4+1

=== Ammunition ===
HE Mortar Shell

- 120 mm HE Mortar Shell Mk12P1-L
- 120 mm HE Mortar Shell M62P8

Smoke Mortar Shell

- 120 mm High-Smoke Mortar Shell M89
- 120 mm Smoke Mortar Shell M64P2
- 120 mm Smoke Mortar Shell M64P3
- 120 mm Smoke Mortar Shell Mk12
- 120 mm Smoke Mortar Shell Mk12-L

Illuminating Mortar Shell

- 120 mm Illuminating Mortar Shell M91
- 120 mm Illuminating Mortar Shell M87P1

== Operators ==
=== Current operators ===
- Bosnia-Herzegovina: 100
- Croatia
- Georgia: 33
- Serbia

=== Former operators ===
- Artsakh
- Yugoslavia
- Al-Nusra Front: Bosnian-made, supplied via Saudi Arabia

== See also ==
- 120 KRH 92
- 2B11
- 2S12 Sani
- Mortier 120mm Rayé Tracté Modèle F1
- Soltam K6
