= M80 Zolja =

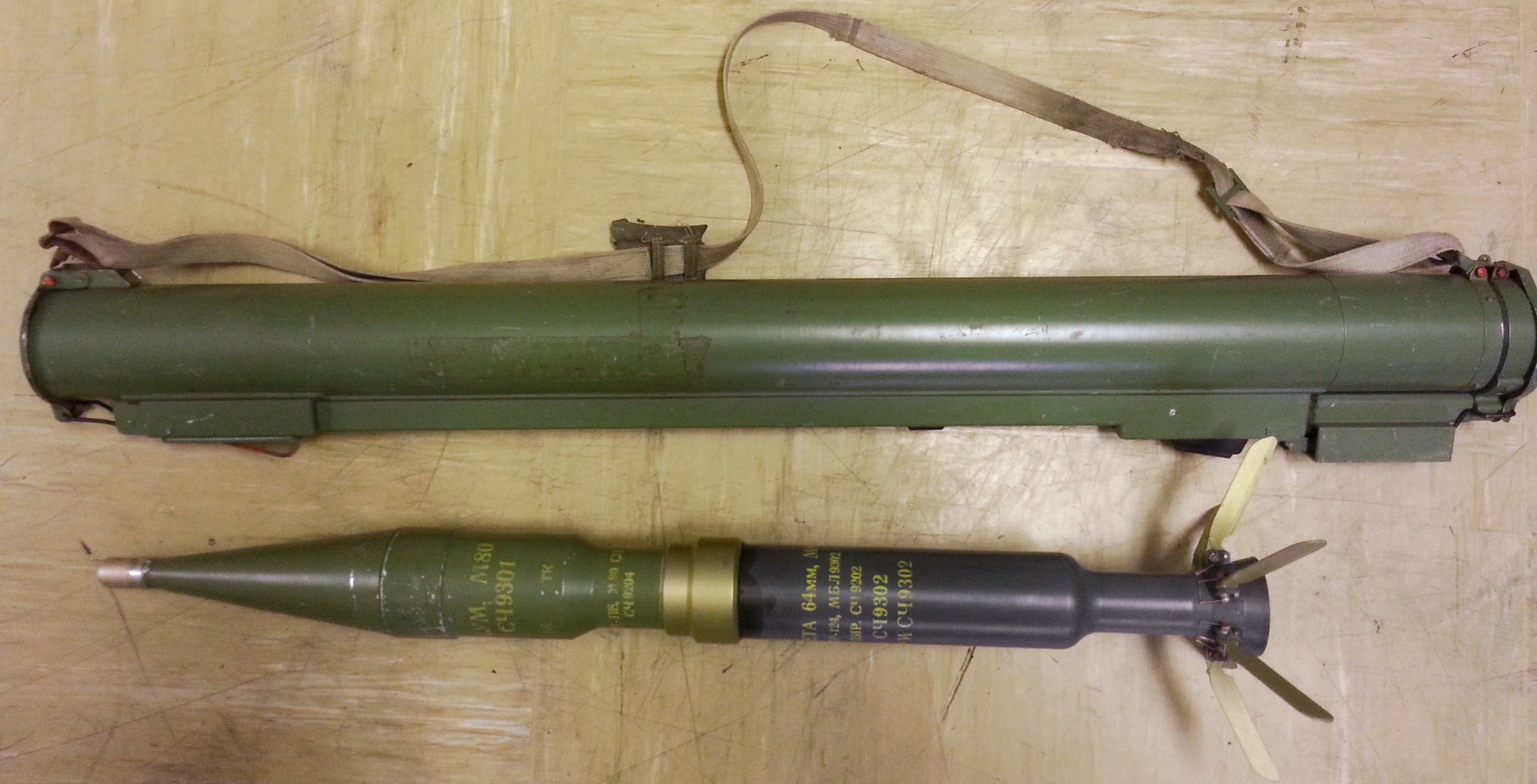
- The M80 Zolja in collapsed position and its rocket
- Type: Anti-tank rocket-propelled grenade launcher
- Place of origin: Yugoslavia

Production history
- Designer: Military Technical Institute
- Designed: 1980
- Manufacturer: Sloboda
- No. built: 10,000+

Specifications
- Mass: 3 kg (loaded)
- Length: 800 mm: (unarmed); 1200 mm: (ready to fire)
- Caliber: 64 mm
- Action: 300 mm: RHA
- Muzzle velocity: 190 m/s
- Effective firing range: 220 m
- Maximum firing range: 1280 m
- Sights: Iron sights

The M80 Zolja (from Serbian: зоља, lit. 'wasp') is a portable one-shot disposable 64 mm unguided anti-tank rocket-propelled grenade, designed in the former Yugoslavia. The M80 Zolja is still produced in Serbia and in North Macedonia.

== Description ==
Constructed from fibre-reinforced plastics, the M80 Zolja is designed to be used by an individual against armoured fighting vehicles or fortifications.

The M80 Zolja is a single-use recoilless weapon which is characterized by its simple operation and lightweight characteristics. The launcher and the container are incorporated into a single unit.

== Launcher ==
The M80 Zolja launcher is telescoping which is intended for easier transportation. The launchers consists of a forward and rear tube made of fibre-reinforced plastic, a firing mechanism, front and rear aiming sights, a carry handle, front and rear caps to keep debris out and a sling.

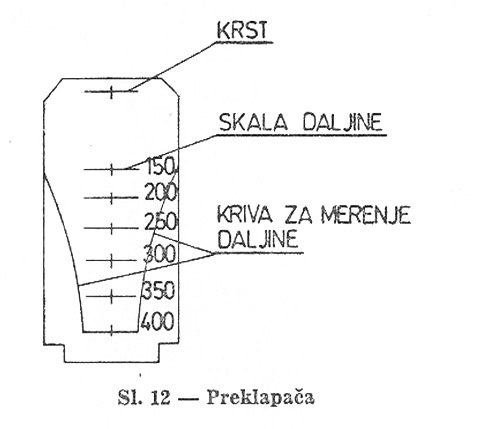
Aimsight of 64mm M80 "Zolja" RPG launcher

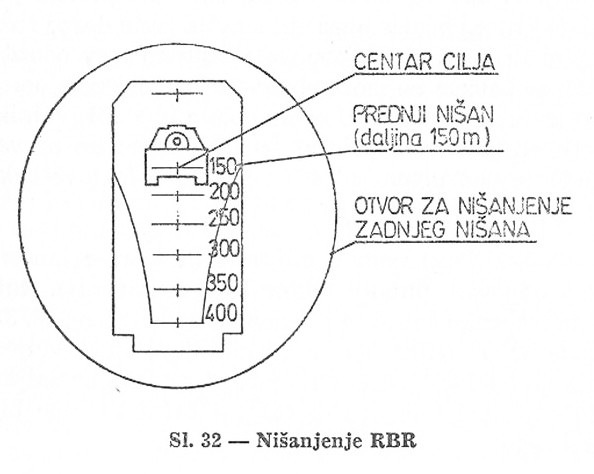
Aiming the M80 "Zolja"

== Rocket ==
The 64mm anti-tank missile is located in the rear of the launcher. The missile consists of an explosive warhead, stabilizer wings and a solid fuel rocket.

The M80's warhead has the potential to penetrate 300 mm of solid steel at a 90-degree angle. The warhead may be fitted with an impact and piezoelectric blasting mechanism. A self-destruct mechanism is also integrated into the rocket which ensures that the rockets self-destruct if the target is not hit within 4 to 6 seconds of flight. The rocket propellant is only fired while in the tube, which propels the rocket to a speed of 190 m/s. This speed ensures that the rocket reaches its 240 m range at a 2.5 meter target.

== Operation ==
The launcher is held in both hands. The operator opens the covers on both ends of the launcher, grasping the forward tube piece firmly with his left hand the operator pulls the back tube outwards with a sharp, hard pull. If the launcher has been successfully cocked, the back piece will not slide in. The operator assumes a correct firing position, keeping in mind the backblast zone of the launcher, takes aim through the flip up sights and squeezes the trigger to fire the rocket. Afterwards the empty tube is disposed of.

== Use ==
The M80 was widely used in the Yugoslav Wars and the 2001 insurgency in Macedonia. Many units ended up in civilian hands and have been used in a number of violent incidents. The weapon has also been used by organized crime; one such incident was a November 1999 assassination attempt in downtown Zagreb, when the projectile ricocheted off the target's armored car and killed an innocent bystander. Members of the Zemun Clan at one time considered using the M80 to attack the former Serbian Prime Minister Zoran Đinđić's motorcade. Bosnian Serb mercenaries in Zaire used some M80s against Alliance of Democratic Forces for the Liberation of Congo in 1997 during the first Congo War.

== Specifications ==
=== Launcher ===
- Length:
  - Extended: 1,200 mm.
  - Closed: 800 mm.
- Weight:
  - With rocket: 3 kg.
  - Without rocket: 1.58 kg.
- Firing mechanism: Percussion.
- Front sight: reticle.
- Rear sight: peep sight.

=== Rocket ===
- Caliber: 64 mm
- Length: 664 mm
- Weight: 1.42 kg
- Muzzle velocity: 190 m/s
- Minimum range (combat): 10 m
- Maximum range: 1,280 m (3,300 ft)
- Penetration: 300 mm

=== Maximum effective range ===
- Stationary target: 220 m

== Operators ==
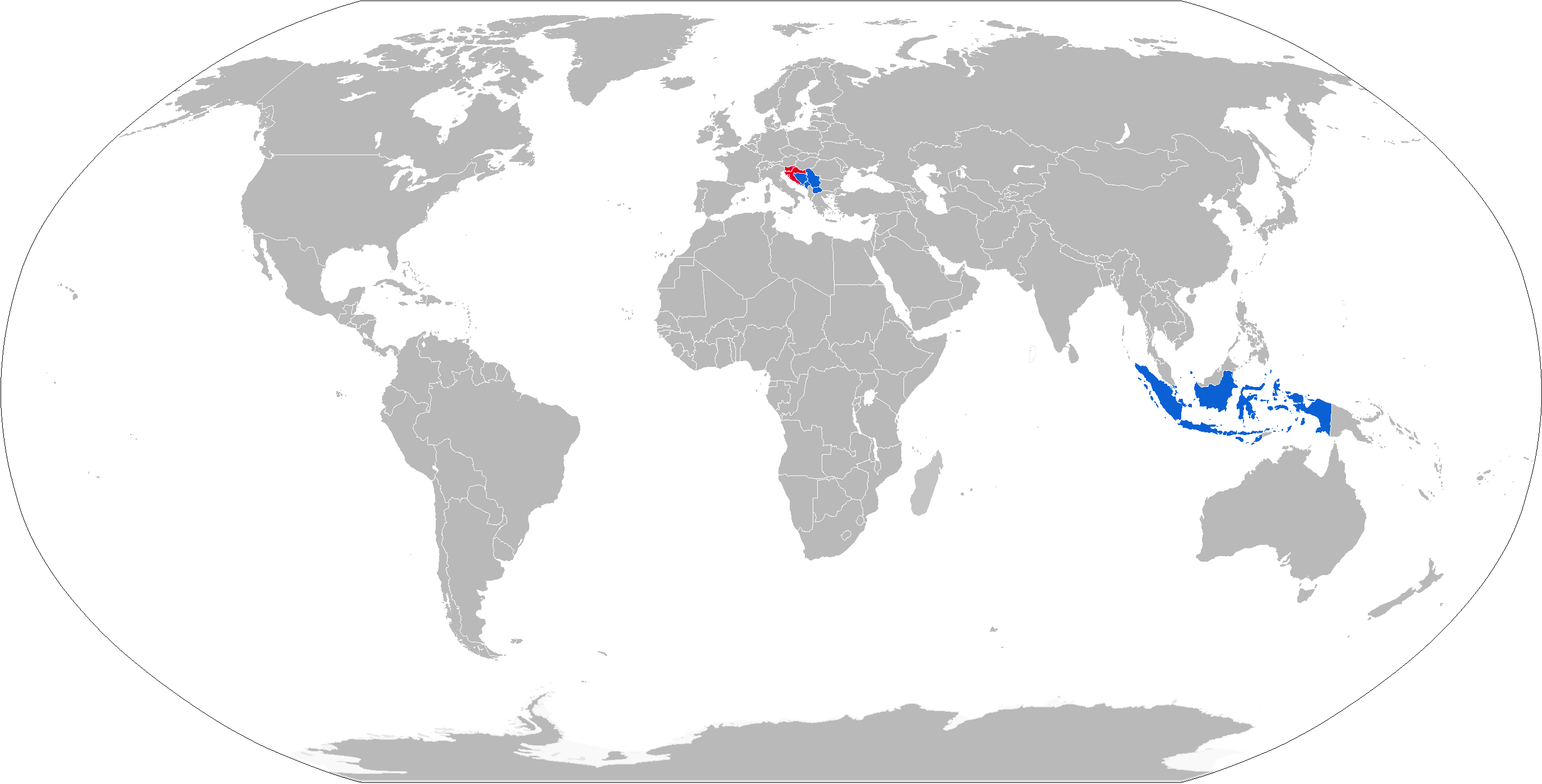
Operators Current Former

=== Current operators ===
- Georgia
- Indonesia
- Kosovo
- Montenegro
- North Macedonia
- Serbia
- Ukraine

=== Former operators ===
- Bosnia and Herzegovina - Withdrawn from service, replaced by donated AT4's.
- Croatia - Withdrawn from use, replaced by Swedish made AT4.
- Slovenia - Withdrawn from use, replaced by German made MATADOR.
- Yugoslavia - Passed on to successor states.
- Zaire

== See also ==
- M72 LAW – (United States)

== Bibliography ==
- Jones, Richard D.; Ness, Leland, eds. (2010). Jane's Infantry Weapons 2010-2011 (36th ed.). Janes Information Group. ISBN 978-0-7106-2908-1.
