= PPT Namenska =

Companies based in Trstenik

- Native name: ППТ Наменска; PPT Namenska
- Type: Joint-stock company
- Industry: Arms industry, Aerospace manufacturer
- Founded: 31 December 1999; 26 years ago
- Headquarters: Trstenik, Serbia
- Key people: Anđelka Atanasković (CEO)
- Products: Hydraulics, pneumatics, mortar, unmanned ground vehicle, airplane parts
- Revenue: ▲€19.54 million (2018)
- Net income: ▲€2.50 million (2018)
- Total assets: ▲€33.65 million (2018)
- Total equity: €0 (2018)
- Owner: Government of Serbia (100%)
- Number of employees: 662 (2018)
- Website: ppt-namenska.rs

PPT Namenska (Serbian: ППТ Наменска, romanized: PPT Namenska) is a Serbian manufacturer of arms, mortars, grenade launchers, unmanned ground vehicle, hydraulics and pneumatics, airplane parts and some complex weapons system including modernized M-77 Oganj, PASARS-16, and LRSVM Morava in various stages of production. There is also a production for civil and industries users.

Its headquarters and main production facilities are located in the town of Trstenik.

== History ==
=== Foundation ===
"Prva Petoletka Trstenik" (PPT) was founded on 23 March 1949, by the Government of People's Federal Republic of Yugoslavia, at the beginning of the first five-year plan of development, after which it was named. It was planned to manufacture combat and training aircraft. But Josip Tito ordered in 1949 that about 150 most advanced factories and their production to be moved from Serbia to Bosnia and Herzegovina, Croatia and Slovenia under a pretext of a Soviet invasion that never occurred. Thus Prva Petoletka never produced a complete aircraft but only parts such as hydraulics and landing gears.

The Government of Serbia invested 3.5 million euros in factory's modernization in 2017, for the needs of defense industry.

== Organization ==
Since 2008 PPT Namenska is separate legal entity and operates under government control as part of Defense industry of Serbia. In 2017, a modernization program was started and new machines for production are obtained.

== Products ==
=== Military ===
- PASARS-16
- Mali Miloš
- Mortars
- Grenade launchers
- Parts for Soko J-22 Orao, Soko G-4 Super Galeb, and Utva Lasta

=== Civil industries ===
- Injection molding machines
- Blow molding machines
- Labeling machines
- Filling machines
- Linear capping machines
- Hydraulic operating cylinders
- Servo actuators
- Valves
- Hydraulic and other pumps

== See also ==
- Defence industry of Serbia
