= Technical Testing Center =

- Технички опитни центар
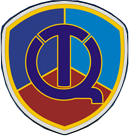
- Active: 1973 – present
- Country: Serbia
- Branch: Serbian General Staff
- Role: Testing and assessment of military equipment
- Part of: Serbian Armed Forces
- Garrison/HQ: Belgrade
- Anniversaries: 22 March

Commanders
- Current commander: Colonel Nenko Brkljač

Technical Testing Center (Serbian: Технички опитни центар, romanized: Tehnički opitni centar) is an acceptance testing facility that provides testing of new and existing military aircraft, military vehicles, military equipment, battle systems, civilian products for the Serbian Armed Forces and is subordinated to the General Staff.

== History ==
Technical Testing Center was founded by Yugoslav Federal Defence Secretariat on 22 March 1973 by uniting and transforming seven military technical institutes of Yugoslav Ground Forces. In 2006 due to rationalization it was merged with the Air Force Testing Center and Navy Testing Center into a single institution.

== Missions ==
Technical Testing Center primary mission include quality control of military equipment as well as metrological securing of the defense system. It is obligated to research maximum weapons capabilities and to demonstrate possibilities of different usage and usage in extreme circumstances.

Center employs more than 150 engineers as well as highly skilled pilots and drivers who are in charge of driving or flying prototypes tested. It has 25 laboratories and 2 testing polygons with about 2,000 measuring devices. It has more than 350 developed methods for testings and it is involved in making of more than 700 defense standards.

Some of 7,000 tests conducted by the Center include:

- Soko J-22 Orao attack aircraft (breaking sound barrier for first time in his history was done by center's pilot)
- Soko G-4 Super Galeb light attack and jet trainer aircraft
- Utva Lasta 95 trainer aircraft
- Nora B-52 self-propelled artillery system
- Lazar 3 armored personnel carrier
- Zastava M20 MRAP vehicle
- Zastava NTV light armored vehicle
- BOV M16 Miloš light armored vehicle
- FAP 2026 truck
- Pegaz combat drone
- Gavran 145 loitering munition
- Osica loitering munition
- Komarac loitering munition
- Vrabac reconnaissance drone
- Zastava M19 assault rifle
- SPP-1 underwater pistol new model M
- ASM-DT amphibious rifle

== Structure ==
Center consists of five departments and three testing centers:

- Weapons department
- Electronics department
- Vehicle and River Flotilla Equipment department
- Air Force Equipment department
- Metrology department
- Center for flight tests (Batajnica Air Base)
- Center for testing weapons and equipment (Nikinci)
- Center for examination of products

== Testing accidents ==
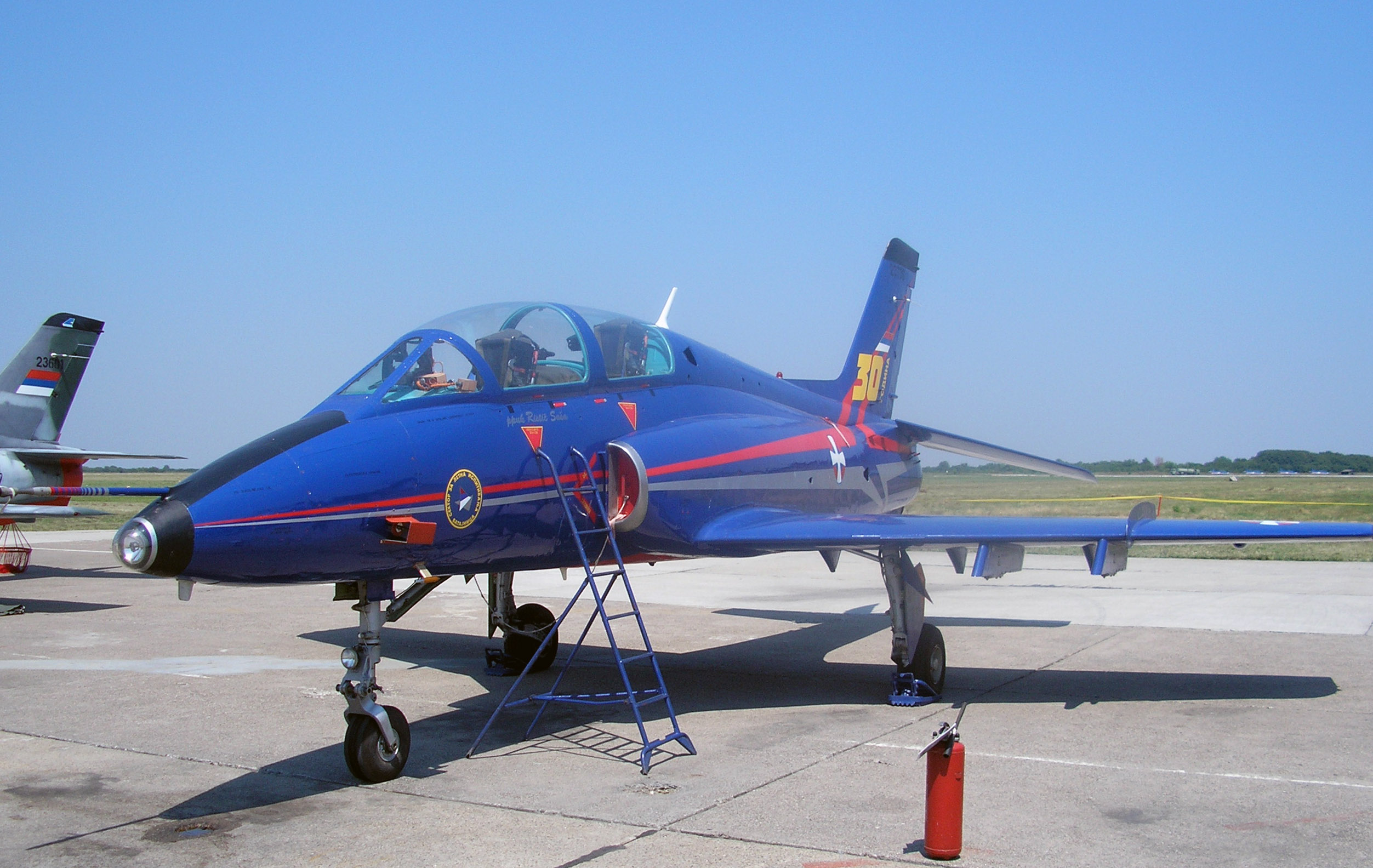
Center's Soko G-4 Super Galeb (serial number 23736) before it was damaged beyond repair

Since testing of new weaponry is always high risk mission there were accident during test procured by the center with some of them having fatalities. During tests there are explosions, flights with new, never before tested and crewed aircraft types, dangerous tasks like testing new tanks passing rivers by diving, firing of new missile and many more risks. Some notable accidents include:

- While testing of new weapons systems on Soko G-4 Super Galeb with serial number 23634 at Batajnica Air Base airport on 24 June 1987 pilot-captain Milan Pavlović died in crash and aircraft was destroyed
- While manoeuvering on Soko G-4 Super Galeb (serial number 23736) at Batajnica Air Base on 24 September 2008, pilot-colonel Ištvan Kanaš died in a crash and the aircraft was damaged beyond repair
- While testing new subsystems on Mig 21bis (serial number 17135) in 1991 the plane was destroyed, the pilot ejected and was not injured
