= 1st Army Brigade =

- 1. бригада Копнене војске
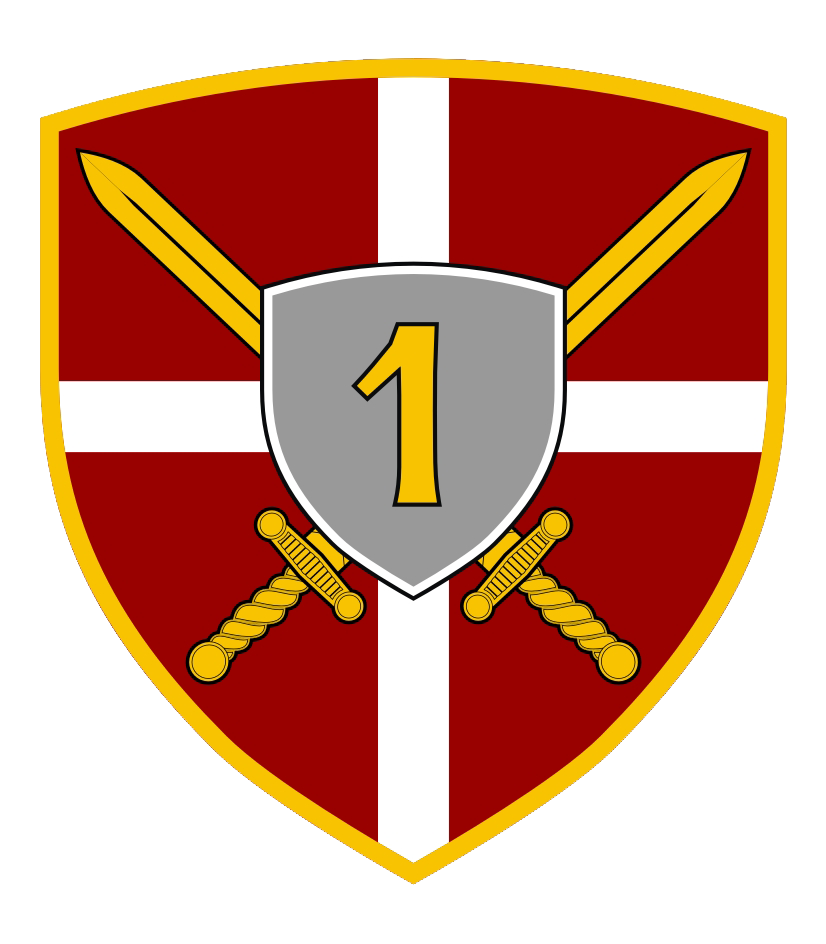
- Active: 2006–present
- Country: Serbia
- Branch: Serbian Army
- Type: Mechanized infantry Armour
- Role: Combined Arms
- Part of: Serbian Armed Forces
- Garrison/HQ: Novi Sad
- Anniversaries: 9 November

Commanders
- Current commander: Brigadier general Jovica Matić

The 1st Army Brigade (Serbian: 1. бригада Копнене војске, romanized: 1. brigada Kopnene vojske) is a mixed (mechanized infantry and armoured) brigade of the Serbian Army.

== History ==
The brigade was formed on July 31, 2006, from units located in Vojvodina and Mačva: Novi Sad Corps and parts of the 1st Armoured Brigade as well as 402nd and 485th Pontoon Battalion. In 2007 brigade was again reorganized, with 110th and 111th Poonton Battalion being subordinated to the Serbian River Flotilla.

== Structure ==
The Brigade's units are spread out throughout the territory of northern Serbia, mostly Vojvodina and Mačva, from the border with Hungary on north to Croatia and Romania on west and east, to western Serbia to the south. It consists of mechanized infantry, armoured, artillery, air defence artillery, engineer, signal and logistics units.

- 10th Command Battalion – Novi Sad
- 11th Infantry Battalion – Pančevo
- 111th Infantry Battalion – Loznica
- 12th Self-Propelled Artillery Battalion – Bačka Topola
- 13th Self-Propelled Multiple Rocket Launcher Artillery Battalion – Sremska Mitrovica
- 14th Air-Defence Artillery Battalion – Pančevo
- 15th Tank Battalion – Sremska Mitrovica
- 16th Mechanized Battalion – Sremska Mitrovica
- 17th Mechanized Battalion – Bačka Topola
- 18th Engineer Battalion – Novi Sad
- 19th Logistics Battalion – Novi Sad

== Equipment ==
- M-84 main battle tank
- BVP M-80 infantry fighting vehicle
- Lazar 3 armoured personnel carrier
- BTR-50 command armoured personnel carrier
- BRDM-2 armoured reconnaissance vehicle
- M20 mine-resistant ambush protected vehicle
- BOV M16 Miloš mine-resistant ambush protected vehicle
- 2S1 Gvozdika 122mm self-propelled howitzer
- M-77 Oganj 128mm self-propelled multiple rocket launcher
- PASARS-16 short-range surface-to-air missile system
- Strela 10 short-range surface-to-air missile system
- Skylark 3 short-range reconnaissance drone
- Vrabac short-range reconnaissance drone
- Komarac miniature loitering munition
- engineer and logistics vehicles and equipment

== Traditions ==
=== Anniversary ===
The anniversary of the unit is celebrated on November 9. On that date in 1918 7th Infantry Regiment of the Royal Serbian Army has liberated Novi Sad in World War I.

=== Patron saint ===
The unit's slava, or patron saint, is Saint Nestor.
