= 3rd Army Brigade =

- 3. бригада Kопнене војске
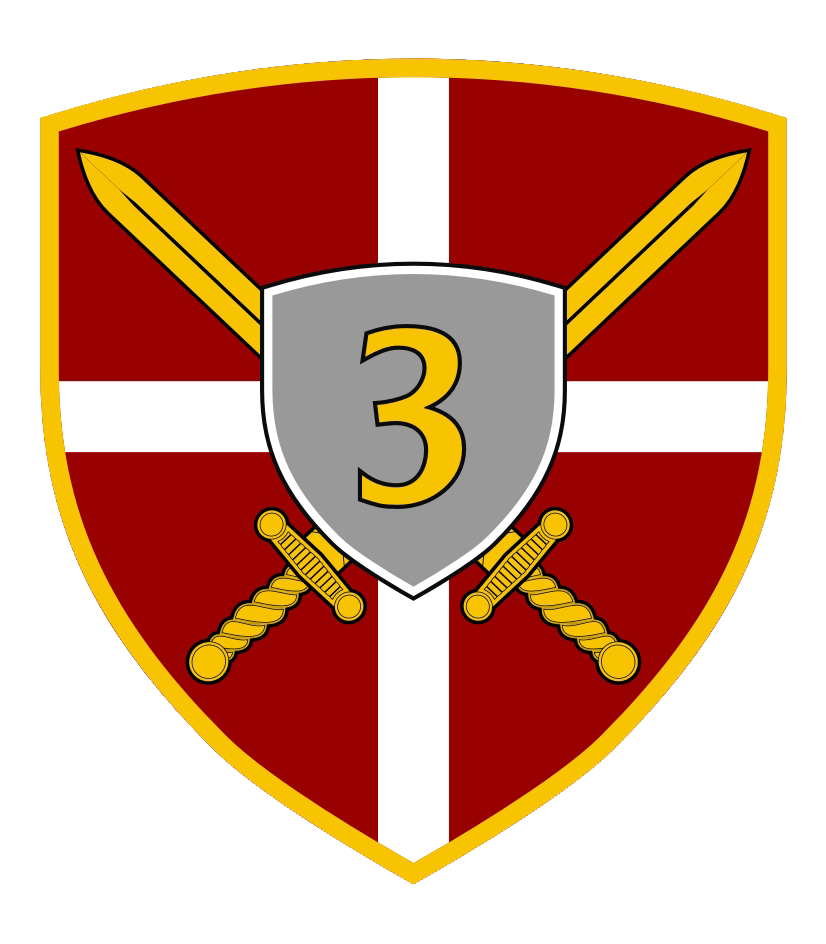
- Active: 4 June 2007–present
- Country: Serbia
- Branch: Serbian Army
- Type: Mechanized infantry Armoured
- Role: Combined Arms
- Part of: Serbian Armed Forces
- Garrison/HQ: Niš
- Patron: Saint Stefan the First-Crowned
- Anniversaries: 7 October

Commanders
- Current commander: Col. Saša Todorov

The 3rd Army Brigade (Serbian: 3. бригада Копнене војске, romanized: 3. brigada Kopnene vojske) is a mixed (mechanized infantry and armoured) brigade of the Serbian Army.

== History ==
The brigade was formed on 4 June 2007 from the former Army units located in eastern Serbia: 211th Armoured Brigade, 9th Infantry Brigade, 125th Motorized Brigade, 549th Motorized Brigade, 4th Motorized Brigade, 352nd Engineer Regiment, 52nd Air Defence Artillery Brigade and several other smaller units.

== Structure ==
Brigade is concentrated in southeastern Serbia, from the border with Bulgaria in the east to the Danube and Velika Morava rivers in the north and west, and to Toplica area to the south. It consists of mechanized infantry, armoured, artillery, air defence artillery, engineer, signal and logistics units.

- 30th Command Battalion – Niš
- 31st Infantry Battalion – Zaječar
- 32nd Infantry Battalion – Zaječar
- 33rd Self-propelled Howitzer Artillery Battalion – Prokuplje
- 34th Multiple Rocket Launcher Battalion – Prokuplje
- 35th Air-defence Artillery Battalion – Niš
- 36th Tank Battalion – Niš
- 37th Mechanized Battalion – Kuršumlija
- 38th Mechanized Battalion – Kuršumlija
- 39th Logistics Battalion – Niš
- 310th Engineer Battalion – Prokuplje

== Equipment ==
- M-84 main battle tank
- T-72B1MS main battle tank
- BVP M-80 infantry fighting vehicle
- Lazar 3M infantry fighting vehicle
- Lazar 3 armoured personnel carrier
- BRDM-2MS armoured reconnaissance vehicle
- M20 mine-resistant ambush protected vehicle
- BOV M16 Miloš mine-resistant ambush protected vehicle
- 2S1 Gvozdika 122mm self-propelled howitzer
- M-77 Oganj 128mm self-propelled multiple rocket launcher
- PASARS-16 short range surface-to-air missile system
- Strela 1 short-range surface-to-air missile system
- Skylark 3 short-range reconnaissance drone
- Vrabac short-range reconnaissance drone
- Komarac miniature loitering munition
- engineer and logistic vehicles and equipment

== Traditions ==
=== Heritage ===
The 3rd Army Brigade continues traditions of the 2nd Infantry Regiment "Prince Mihailo" known as the Iron Regiment, the most decorated unit of the Royal Serbian Army from World War I. The Iron Regiment was intrinsically rooted to Toplica region, where some of brigade's units are nowadays located.

=== Anniversary ===
The day of the brigade is celebrated on October 7. On that day in 1912, during the First Balkan War, the 2nd Infantry Regiment "Prince Mihailo" was sent to its first combat mission.

=== Patron saint ===
The unit's slava or its patron saint is Saint Stefan the First-Crowned.
