= 2nd Army Brigade =

- 2. бригада Kопнене војске
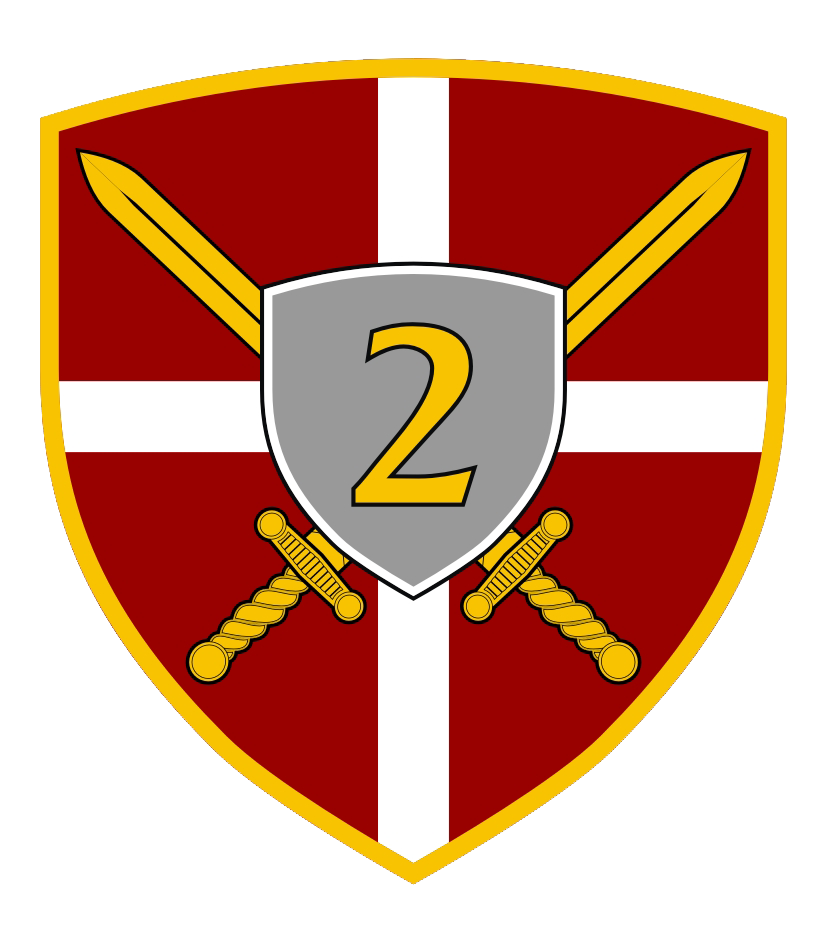
- Active: 2007–present
- Country: Serbia
- Branch: Serbian Army
- Type: Mechanized infantry Armour
- Role: Combined Arms
- Part of: Serbian Armed Forces
- Garrison/HQ: Kraljevo
- Anniversaries: 12 July

Commanders
- Current commander: Brigadier General Nebojša Nedeljković

The 2nd Army Brigade (Serbian: 2. бригада Копнене војске, romanized: 2. brigada Kopnene vojske) is a mixed (mechanized infantry and armoured) brigade of the Serbian Army.

== History ==
The brigade was formed on March 28, 2007, from the former Army units located in western Serbia: 252nd Armoured Brigade, 37th Motorized Brigade, 20th Motorized Brigade, 401st Air Defence Artillery Brigade as well as parts of 228th Signal Battalion, 524th Logistics Base and 24th Special Purpose Battalion.

== Structure ==
Brigade's units are spread out throughout western and central Serbia, from the border with Montenegro on south to Drina and Velika Morava rivers on west and east, to area around city of Valjevo on north. It consists of mechanized infantry, armoured, artillery, air defence artillery, engineer, signal and logistics units.

- 20th Command Battalion – Kraljevo
- 21st Infantry Battalion – Raška
- 22nd Infantry Battalion – Požega
- 23rd Self-propelled Artillery Battalion – Kraljevo
- 24th Self-propelled Missile Launcher Artillery Battalion – Valjevo
- 25th Air-defence Artillery Battalion – Kraljevo
- 26th Tank Battalion – Kraljevo
- 27th Mechanized Battalion – Kraljevo
- 28th Mechanized Battalion – Novi Pazar
- 29th Logistics Battalion – Kraljevo
- 210th Engineer Battalion – Kraljevo

== Equipment ==
- M-84 main battle tank
- BVP M-80 infantry fighting vehicle
- Lazar 3 armoured personnel carrier
- BRDM-2 armoured reconnaissance vehicle
- M20 mine-resistant ambush protected vehicle
- BOV M16 Miloš mine-resistant ambush protected vehicle
- 2S1 Gvozdika 122mm self-propelled howitzer
- PASARS-16 short-range surface-to-air missile system
- Strela 1 short-range surface-to-air missile system
- Skylark 3 short-range reconnaissance drone
- Vrabac short-range reconnaissance drone
- Komarac miniature loitering munition
- engineer and logistic vehicles and equipment

== Traditions ==
=== Anniversary ===
The anniversary of the brigade is celebrated on July 12. On that day in 1805, during the First Serbian Uprising, in the Battle of Karanovac, town of Kraljevo and its surroundings was liberated from Ottoman Empire.

=== Patron saint ===
The unit's slava or its patron saint is Feast of Saints Peter and Paul known as Petrovdan.
