= 4th Army Brigade =

- 4. бригада Kопнене војске
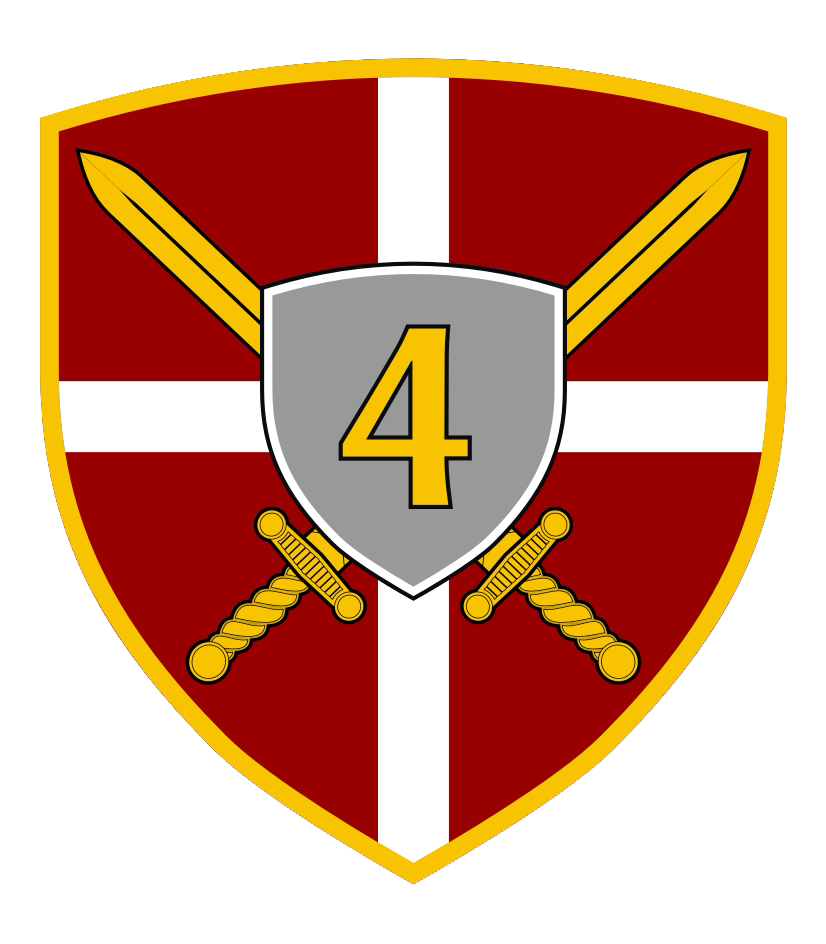
- Active: 2007–present
- Country: Serbia
- Branch: Serbian Army
- Type: Mechanized infantry Armour
- Role: Combined Arms
- Part of: Serbian Armed Forces
- Garrison/HQ: Vranje
- Anniversaries: 31 January

Commanders
- Current commander: Brigadier General Grujica Vuković

The 4th Army Brigade (Serbian: 4. бригада Копнене војске, romanized: 4. brigada Kopnene vojske) is a mixed (mechanized infantry and armoured) brigade of the Serbian Army.

== History ==
The brigade was formed on 30 June 2007 from the former Army units located in southern Serbia: the 78th Motorized Brigade and parts of the 549th Motorized Brigade and the 52nd Mixed Artillery Brigade.

== Structure ==
Brigade is concentrated in southern Serbia, mainly in Pčinja. Most units are based in Vranje, including the command of the brigade, while other units are based in Military Base "South" near Bujanovac and in Leskovac. It consists of mechanized infantry, armoured, artillery, air defence artillery, engineer, signal, and logistics units.

- 40th Command Battalion – Vranje
- 41st Infantry Battalion – Bujanovac (Military Base "South")
- 42nd Infantry Battalion – Bujanovac (Military Base "South")
- 43rd Self-Propelled Howitzer Artillery Battalion – Vranje
- 44th Self-Propelled Multiple Rocket Launcher Artillery Battalion – Leskovac
- 45th Air-defence Artillery Battalion – Vranje
- 46th Tank Battalion – Vranje
- 47th Mechanized Battalion – Vranje
- 48th Mechanized Battalion – Bujanovac (Military Base "South")
- 49th Logistics Battalion – Vranje
- 410th Engineer Battalion – Vranje

== Equipment ==
- M-84 main battle tank
- BVP M-80 infantry fighting vehicle
- Lazar 3M infantry fighting vehicle
- Lazar 3 armoured personnel carrier
- BRDM-2 armoured reconnaissance vehicle
- M20 mine-resistant ambush protected vehicle
- 2S1 Gvozdika 122mm self-propelled howitzer
- M-18 Oganj 128mm self-propelled multiple rocket launcher
- M-77 Oganj 128mm self-propelled multiple rocket launcher
- PASARS-16 short-range surface-to-air missile system
- Strela 1 short-range surface-to-air missile system
- Skylark 3 short-range reconnaissance drone
- Vrabac short-range reconnaissance drone
- Komarac miniature loitering munition
- engineer and logistic vehicles and equipment

== Traditions ==
=== Heritage ===
The 4th Army Brigade continues traditions of the 1st Infantry Regiment "Prince Miloš the Great". The 1st Infantry Regiment "Prince Miloš the Great" was formed in 1897 and has existed until 1941 i.e. after the German attack on Yugoslavia and country's subsequent defeat. Regiment fought in five wars: First Balkan War, Second Balkan War, World War I, the Allied Intervention in Russian Civil War and World War II.

=== Anniversary ===
The day of the brigade is celebrated on January 31. On that day in 1878, Vranje was liberated from Ottoman occupation, and on that date in 1897 the 1st Infantry Regiment "Prince Miloš the Great" was formed.

=== Patron saint ===
The unit's slava or its patron saint is Saint Athanasius.

== See also ==
- Military Base "South"
