= Serbian Army =

Land warfare branch of the Serbian Armed Forces

- Копнена војска Србије
- Emblem of the Serbian Army
- Founded: 1830 (current form since 2006)
- Country: Serbia
- Type: Army
- Role: Land warfare
- Size: 13,200 (2021 est.)
- Part of: Serbian Armed Forces
- Command HQ: Niš, Serbia
- Mottos: For Freedom and Honour of the Fatherland (Serbian: За слободу и част Отаџбине, romanized: Za slobodu i čast Otadžbine)
- Anniversaries: 16 November
- Engagements: Serbian Revolution; Serbian-Turkish Wars (1876–1878); Russo-Turkish War; Serbo-Bulgarian War; Balkan Wars; First Balkan War; Second Balkan War; World War I Allied intervention in the Russian Civil War

Commanders
- Current commander: Major General; Zoran Nasković
- Army Sergeant Major: Warrant officer 1st class Mladen Pupovac
- Notable commanders: Vojvoda Radomir Putnik; Vojvoda Stepa Stepanović; Vojvoda Živojin Mišić; Vojvoda Petar Bojović; General Pavle Jurišić Šturm

Insignia
- Flag

The Serbian Army (Serbian: Копнена војска Србије, romanized: Kopnena vojska Srbije, lit. 'Serbian Land Army') is the land-based and the largest component of the Serbian Armed Forces. Its organization, composition, weapons and equipment are adapted to the assigned missions and tasks of the Serbian Armed Forces, primarily for operations on land.

== History ==
Originally established in 1830 as the Army of Principality of Serbia and after Serbia's independence it subsequently grew in size and was renamed the Royal Serbian Army. After the World War I it was incorporated into the newly established Royal Yugoslav Army which was in turn transformed into Yugoslav Ground Forces of the Yugoslav People's Army after the World War II. The Serbian Army in its current form has been active since 2006 when Serbia restored its independence.

== Missions ==
The Serbian Army is responsible for defending the sovereignty and territorial integrity of Serbia from foreign hostiles; participating in peacekeeping operations; and providing humanitarian aid and disaster relief.

The Army i.e. infantry battalions of its 2nd, 3rd and 4th brigades are tasked with securing the 384 kilometers long and 5 km wide Ground Safety Zone along the administrative line between Serbia and Kosovo with over 20 camps and security checkpoints.

== Structure ==
The Serbian Army consists of six brigades, six independent battalions directly attached to the Army Command, as well as the River Flotilla, the Technical Overhauling Institute and Multinational Operations Training Centre. The four primary army brigades are composed of as many as ten battalions, including: one command battalion, one armored battalion, two mechanized battalions, two infantry battalions, one self-propelled artillery battalion, one self-propelled multiple rocket launcher artillery battalion, one air-defence battalion, one engineer battalion and one logistics battalion.

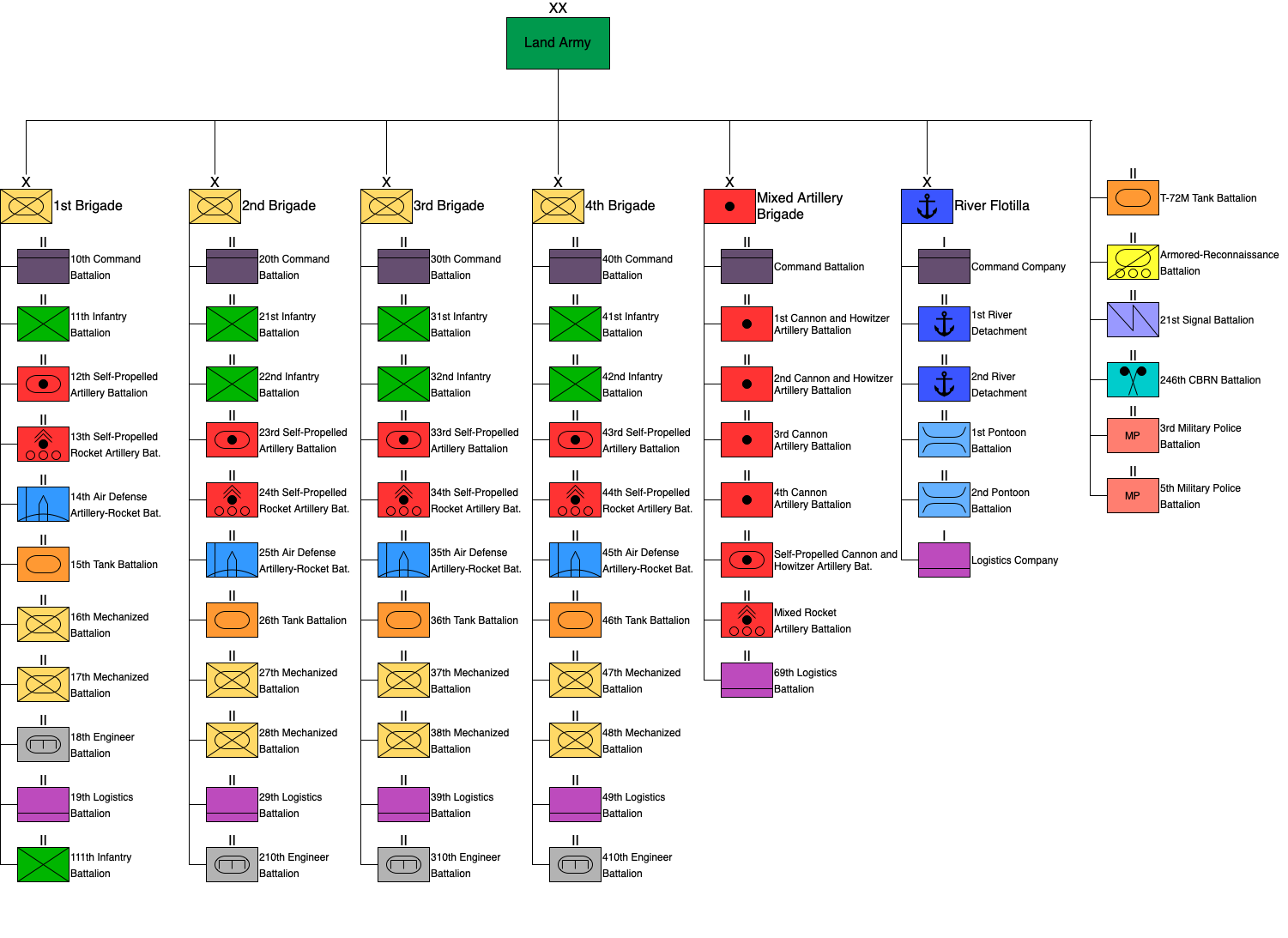
Serbian Army structure

Army Command attached unit
1st Brigade 2nd Brigade 3rd Brigade 4th Brigade
Mixed Artillery Brigade River Flotilla
- Army Command
  - 3rd Military Police Battalion (Niš)
  - 5th Military Police Battalion (Belgrade)
  - 246th NBC Battalion (Kruševac)
  - 21st Signal Battalion (Niš)
  - T–72M Tank Battalion (Niš)
  - Armored Reconnaissance Battalion (Niš)
- 1st Army Brigade
  - 10th Command Battalion (Novi Sad)
  - 11th Infantry Battalion (Pančevo)
  - 12th Self-propelled Artillery Battalion (Bačka Topola)
  - 13th Self-propelled Multiple Rocket Launcher Artillery Battalion (Sremska Mitrovica)
  - 14th Air-defence Artillery Battalion (Pančevo)
  - 15th Tank Battalion (Sremska Mitrovica)
  - 16th Mechanized Battalion (Sremska Mitrovica)
  - 17th Mechanized Battalion (Bačka Topola)
  - 18th Engineer Battalion (Novi Sad)
  - 19th Logistics Battalion (Novi Sad)
  - 111th Infantry Battalion (Loznica)
- 2nd Army Brigade
  - 20th Command Battalion (Kraljevo)
  - 21st Infantry Battalion (Raška)
  - 22nd Infantry Battalion (Požega)
  - 23rd Self-propelled Artillery Battalion (Kraljevo)
  - 24th Self-propelled Multiple Rocket Launcher Artillery Battalion (Valjevo)
  - 25th Air-defence Artillery Battalion (Kraljevo)
  - 26th Tank Battalion (Kraljevo)
  - 27th Mechanized Battalion (Kraljevo)
  - 28th Mechanized Battalion (Novi Pazar)
  - 29th Logistics Battalion (Kraljevo)
  - 210th Engineer Battalion (Kraljevo)
  - 211th Mountain Battalion (Priboj, in process of formation)
- 3rd Army Brigade
  - 30th Command Battalion (Niš)
  - 31st Infantry Battalion (Zaječar)
  - 32nd Infantry Battalion (Zaječar)
  - 33rd Self-propelled Howitzer Artillery Battalion (Niš)
  - 34th Multiple Rocket Launcher Artillery Battalion (Niš)
  - 35th Air-defence Artillery Battalion (Niš)
  - 36th Tank Battalion (Niš)
  - 37th Mechanized Battalion (Kuršumlija)
  - 38th Mechanized Battalion (Kuršumlija)
  - 39th Logistics Battalion (Niš)
  - 310th Engineer Battalion (Prokuplje)
- 4th Army Brigade
  - 40th Command Battalion (Vranje)
  - 41st Infantry Battalion (Military Base "South")
  - 42nd Infantry Battalion (Military Base "South")
  - 43rd Self-propelled Howitzer Artillery Battalion (Vranje)
  - 44th Self-propelled Multiple Rocket Launcher Artillery Battalion (Leskovac)
  - 45th Air-defence Artillery Battalion (Vranje)
  - 46th Tank Battalion (Vranje)
  - 47th Mechanized Battalion (Vranje)
  - 48th Mechanized Battalion (Military Base "South")
  - 49th Logistics Battalion (Vranje)
  - 410th Engineer Battalion (Vranje)

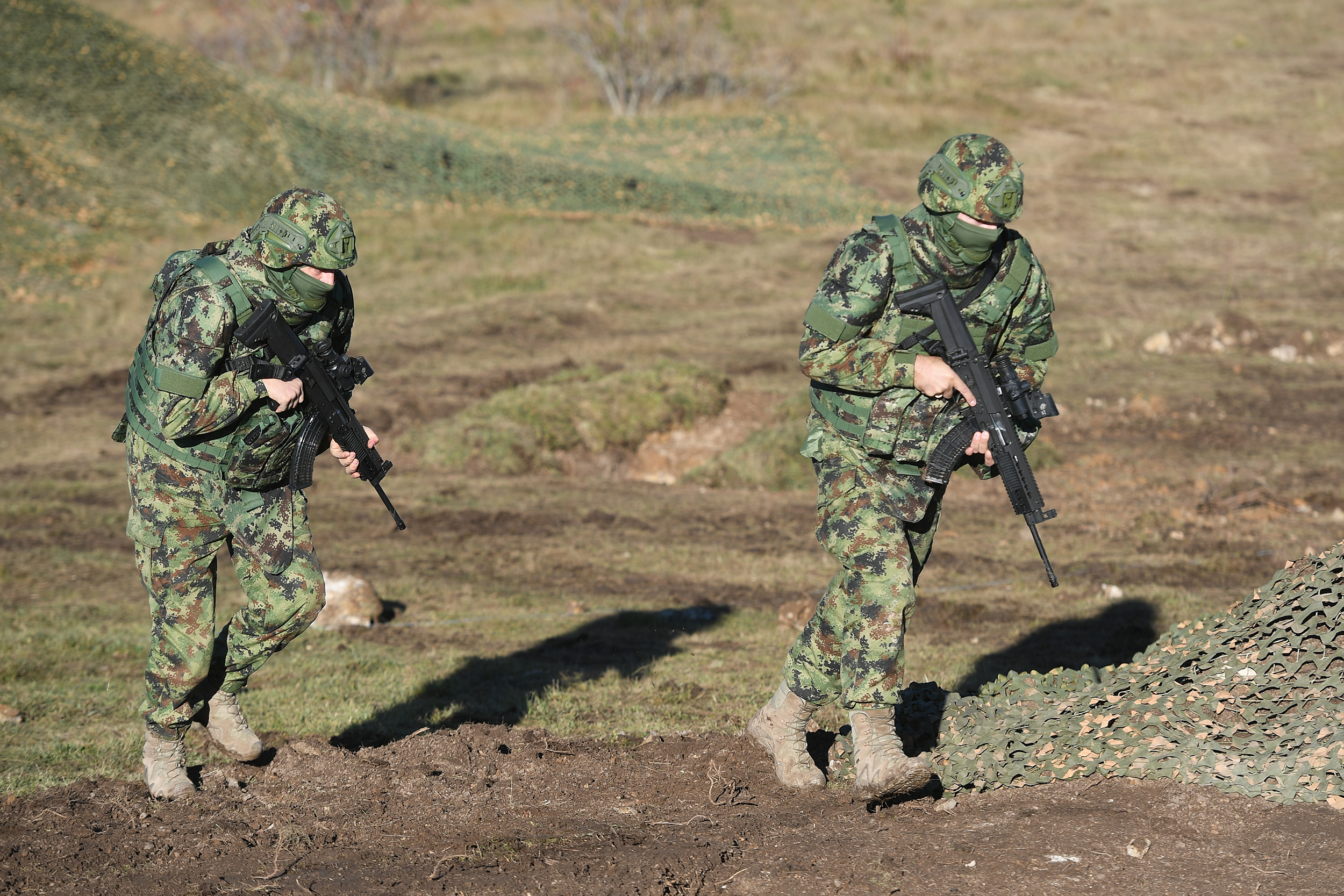
Serbian Army infantrymen

- Mixed Artillery Brigade
  - Command Battalion (Niš)
  - 1st Howitzer-Cannon Artillery Battalion (Niš)
  - 2nd Howitzer-Cannon Artillery Battalion (Niš)
  - 3rd Cannon Artillery Battalion (Niš)
  - 4th Cannon Artillery Battalion (Niš)
  - Self-propelled Howitzer-Cannon Artillery Battalion (Niš)
  - Mixed Missile Artillery Battalion (Niš)
  - 69th Logistics Battalion (Niš)
- River Flotilla
  - Command Company (Novi Sad)
  - 1st River Detachment (Novi Sad)
  - 2nd River Detachment (Belgrade)
  - 1st Pontoon Battalion (Šabac)
  - 2nd Pontoon Battalion (Novi Sad)
  - Logistics Company (Novi Sad)
- Multinational Operations Training Centre
- Technical Overhaul Institute "Čačak"

== Equipment ==
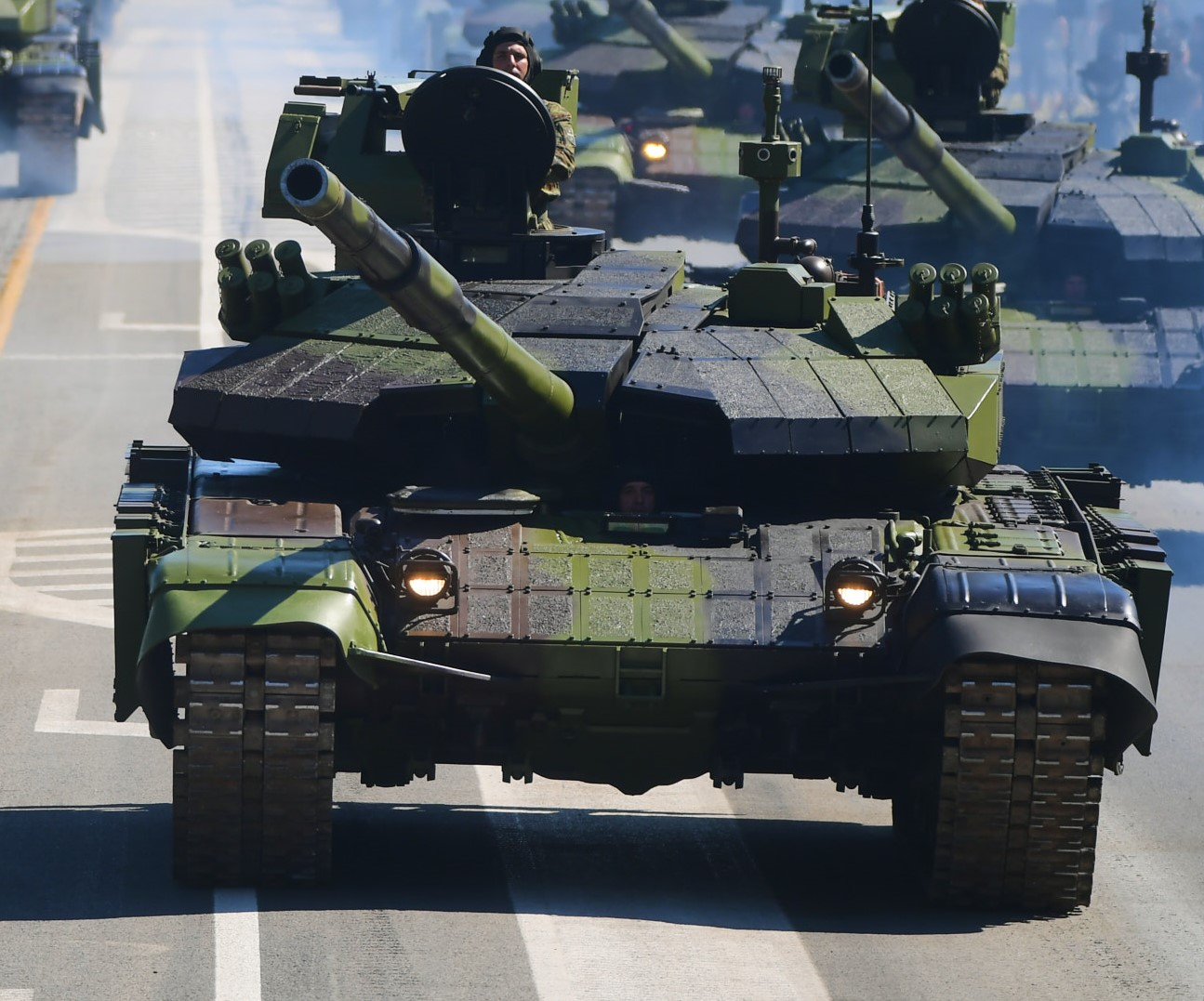
M84AS2 tank

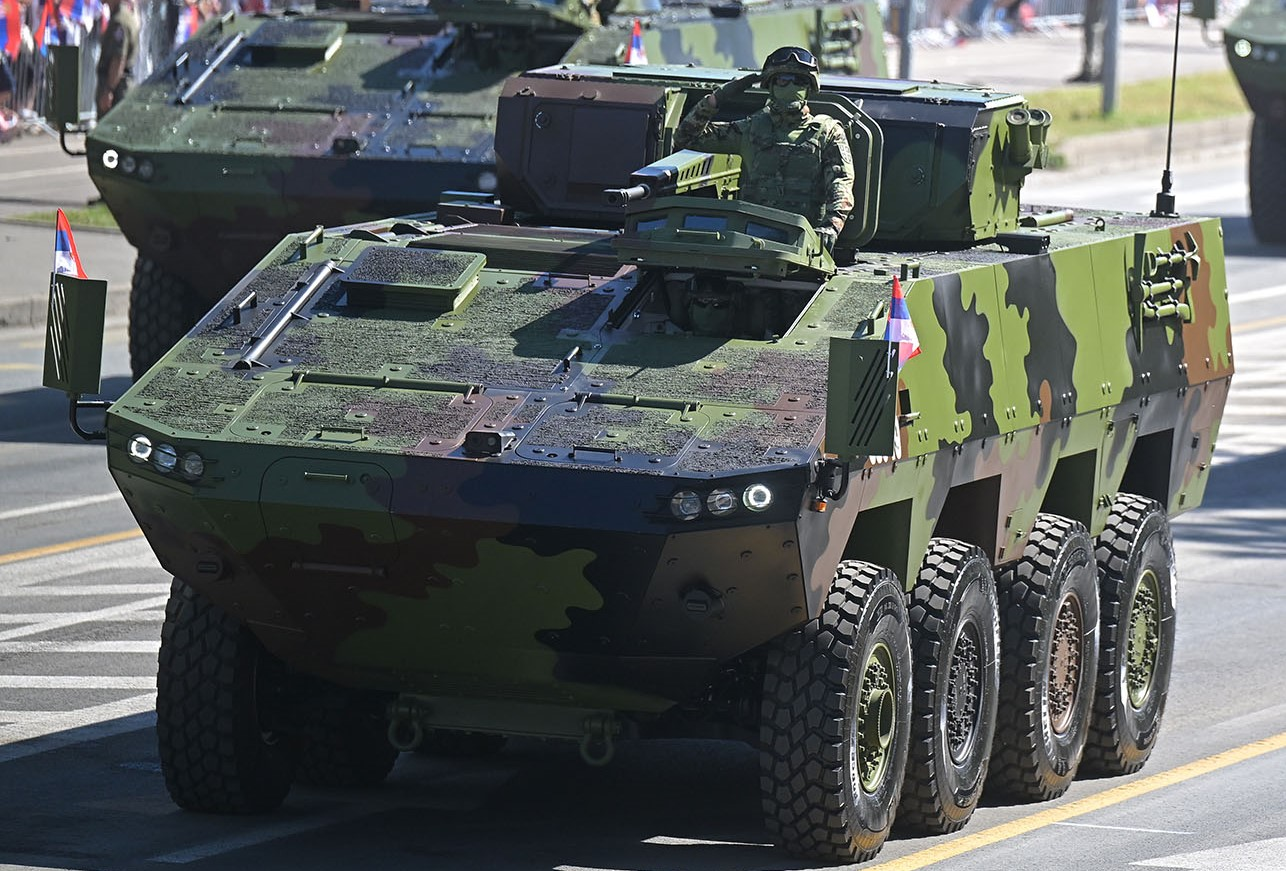
Lazar 3M infantry fighting vehicle

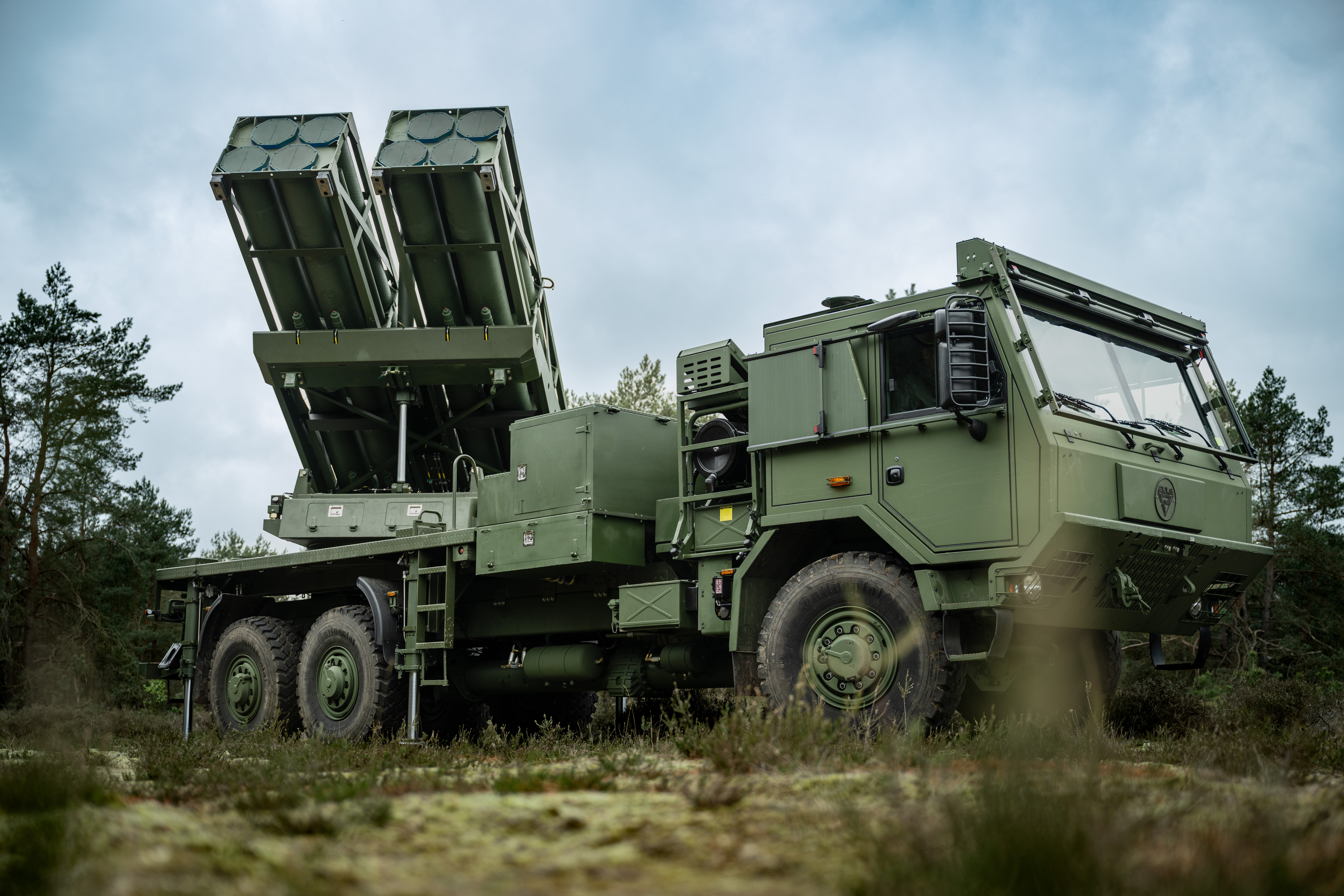
PULS self-propelled multiple rocket launcher

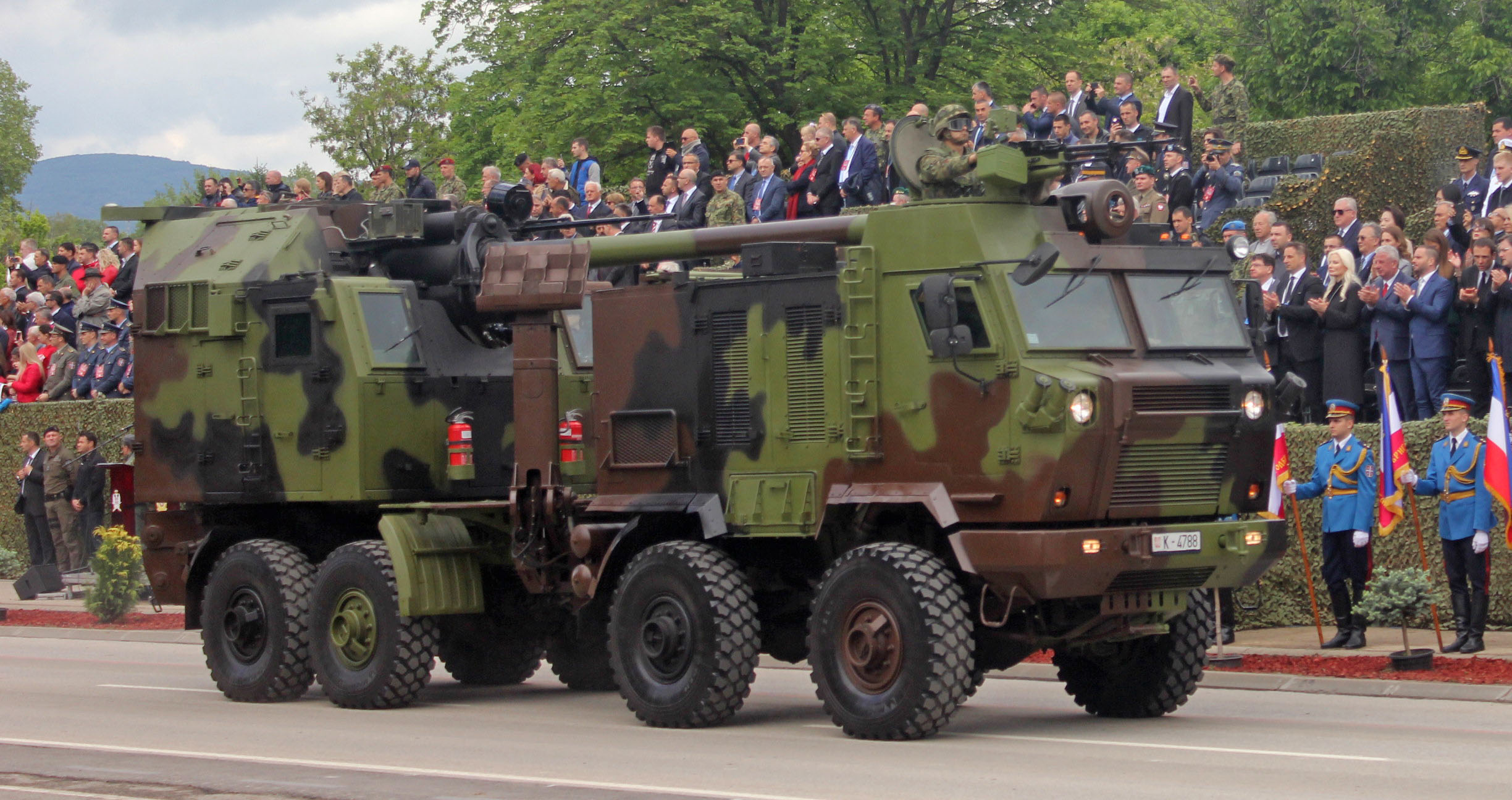
Nora B52 self-propelled howitzer

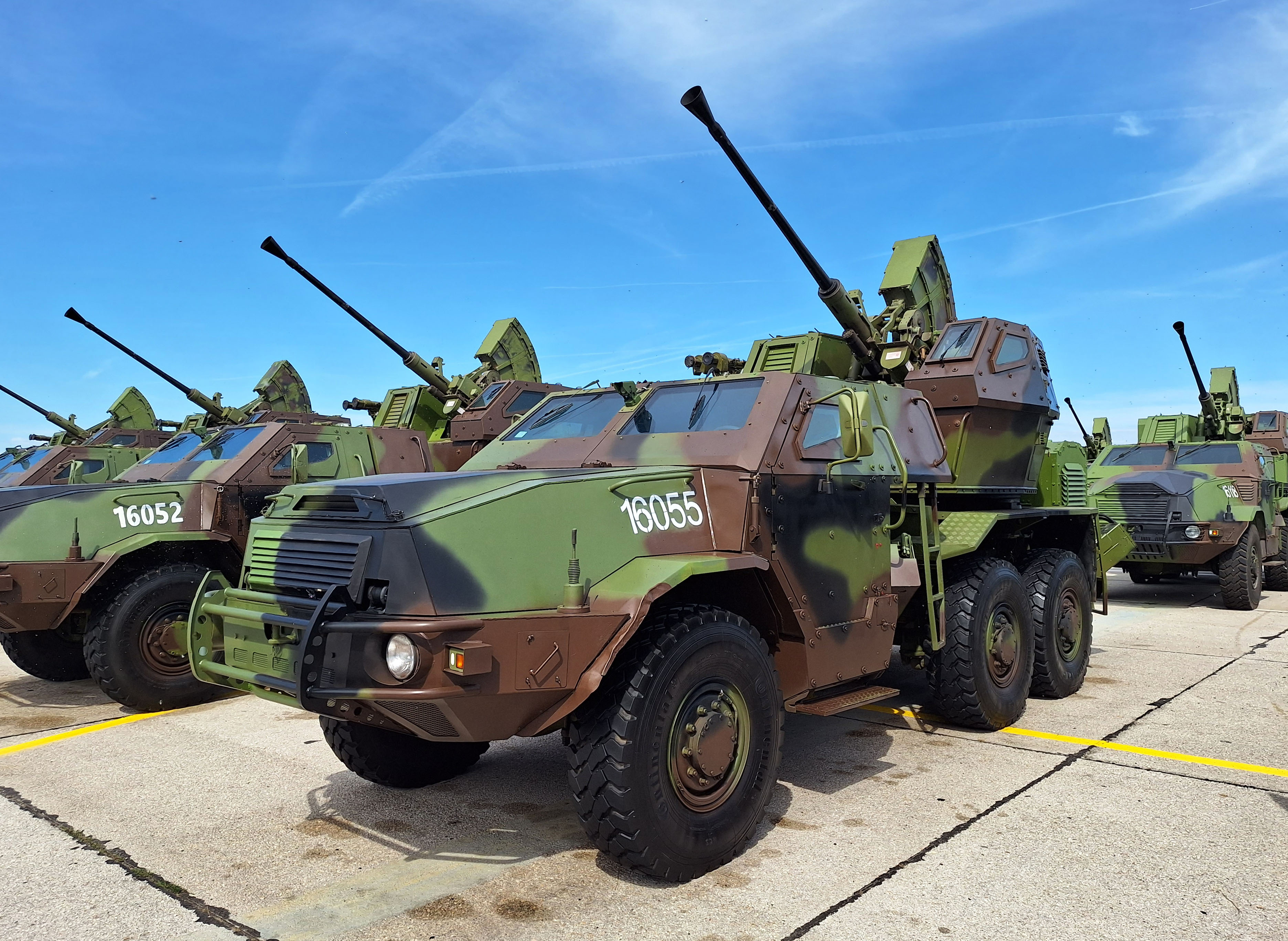
PASARS-16 short-range air defense system

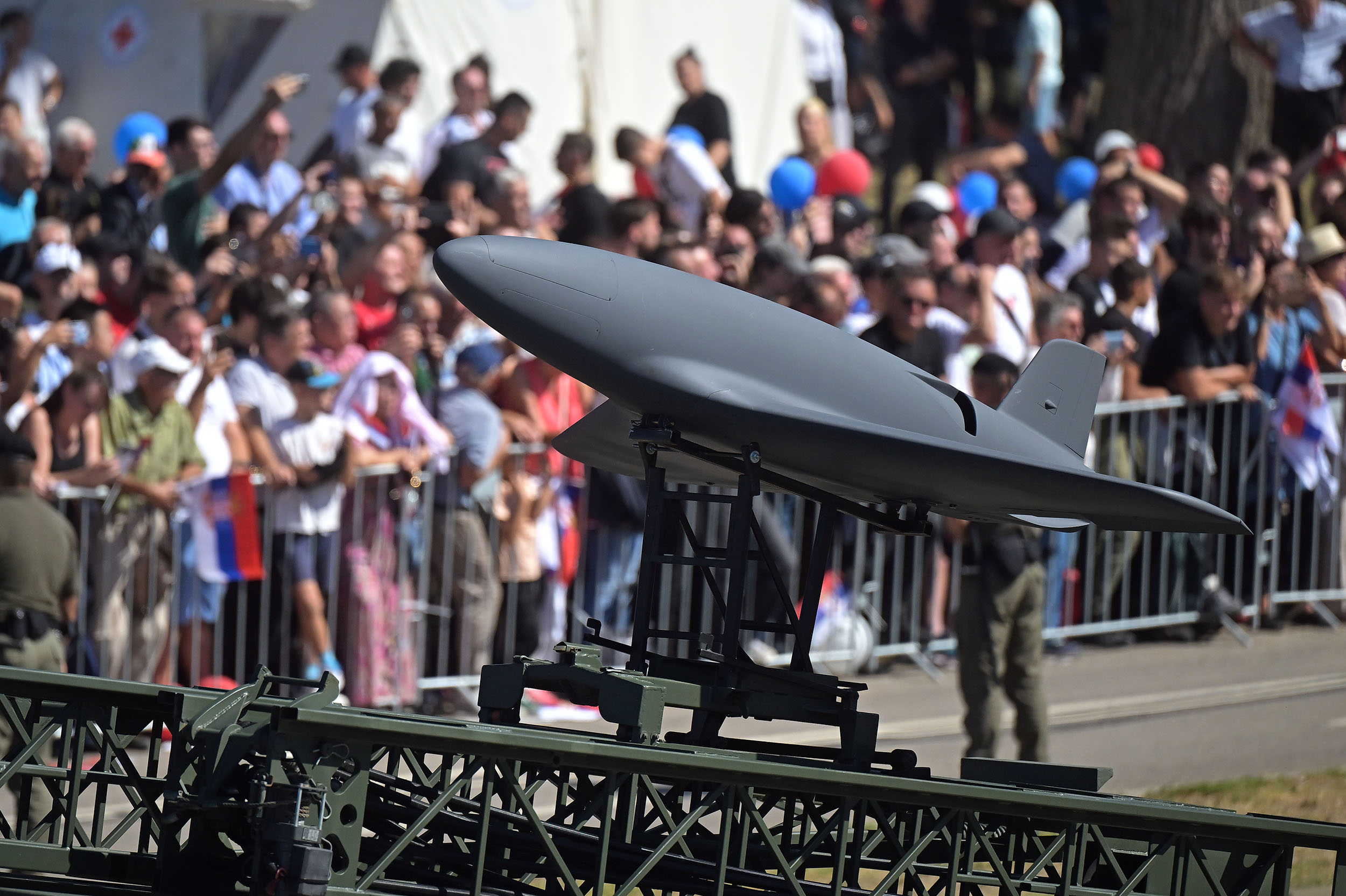
Shadow 25 loitering munition

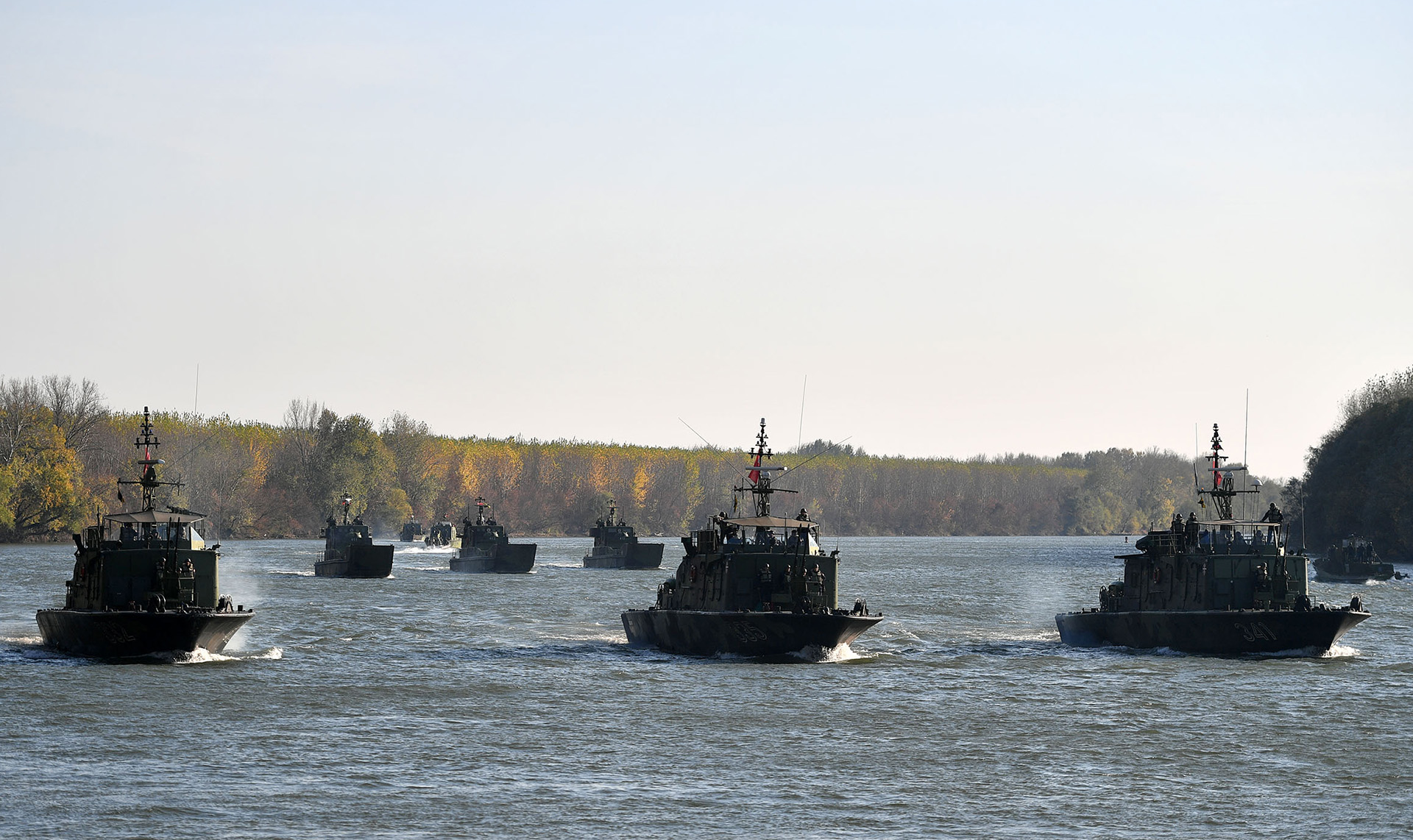
Vessels of the River Flotilla

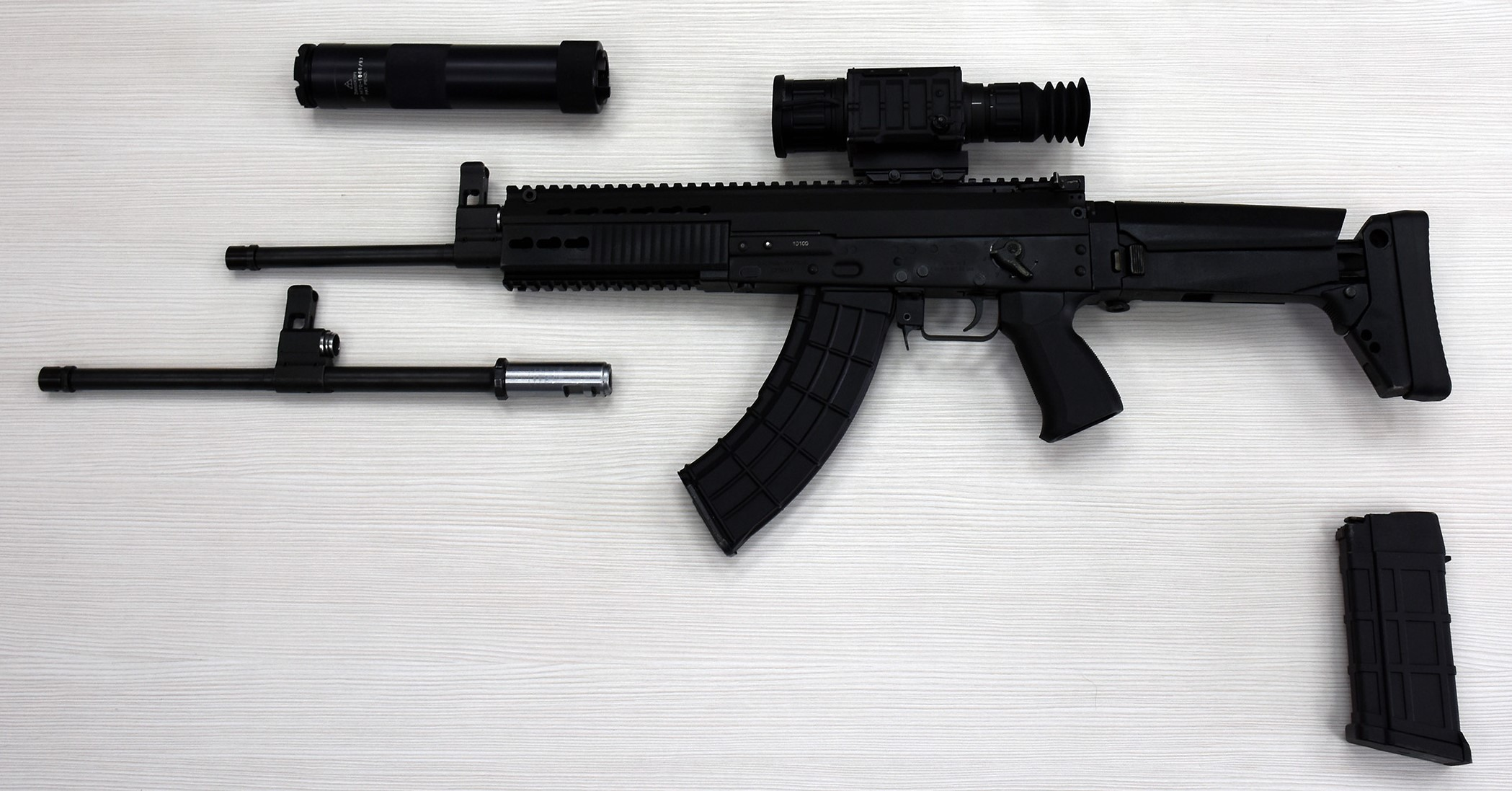
Zastava M19 assault rifle

The following equipment is in operational use as of 2025:

=== Armored vehicles ===
- M-84 main battle tank – 212 (26 M-84AS2; 186 M-84)
- T-72B1MS main battle tank – 30
- Lazar 3M wheeled infantry fighting vehicle – 20
- BVP M-80 tracked infantry fighting vehicle – 325 (29 BVP M-80AB1 and 296 BVP M-80)
- Lazar 3 armoured personnel carrier – 60
- BTR-80A amphibious armoured personnel carrier – 108
- M20 mine-resistant ambush protected vehicle – 22
- Miloš mine-resistant ambush protected vehicle – 60
- BRDM-2 armoured reconnaissance vehicle – 66 (30 BRDM-2MS; 36 BRDM-2)
- BOV KIV command vehicle – 20
- Humvee light armoured vehicle – 104
- BOV M-86 light armoured vehicle – 51 (used by military police)

=== Artillery ===
- PULS 370 mm/306 mm/160 mm self-propelled multiple rocket launcher (armed with Predator Hawk tactical ballistic missiles and EXTRA and ACCULAR artillery rockets) – 20
- M-87 Orkan 262 mm self-propelled multiple rocket launcher – 4
- Nora B-52 155 mm self-propelled howitzer – 24
- 2S1 Gvozdika 122 mm self-propelled howitzer – 72 (54 2S1M Gvozdika and 18 2S1 Gvozdika)
- Nora M-84 152 mm gun-howitzer – 36
- RM-70 Vampire 122 mm self-propelled multiple rocket launcher – 30
- M-18 Oganj 175 mm/128 mm self-propelled multiple rocket launcher – 8
- M-77 Oganj 128 mm self-propelled multiple rocket launcher – 60 (25 M-17D Oganj and 35 M-77 Oganj)
- M-94 Plamen S 122 mm self-propelled multiple rocket launcher – 18
- M74/M75 120 mm mortar

=== Drones ===
- SkyStriker loitering munition
- Shadow 50 loitering munition
- Shadow 25 loitering munition
- SM2 loitering munition
- Gavran 145 loitering munition
- Osica loitering munition
- Komarac loitering munition – 5,000
- Skylark 3 reconnaissance drone
- Vrabac reconnaissance drone – 50
- AD Orbiter reconnaissance drone – 10

=== Anti-armour ===
- BOV Polo M-83M loitering munition launch vehicle – 10
- BOV Polo M-83 anti-tank missile launch vehicle – 38
- 9M133 Kornet anti-tank missile system
- 9K111 Fagot anti-tank missile system
- M80 Zolja anti-tank missile launcher
- M79 Osa anti-tank missile launcher

=== Air-defence ===
- PASARS-16 short-range surface-to-air missile system – 5 batteries
- 9K35 Strela-10 short-range surface-to-air missile system – 1 battery
- 9K31 Strela-1 short-range surface-to-air missile system – 9 batteries
- Mistral 3 MANPADS
- 9K32 Strela-2 MANPADS

=== Vessels ===
- Neštin class minesweeper – 4
- Type 20 Biscaya class river patrol craft – 3
- Type 22 441 class landing crafts – 5
- RPČ 111 patrol vessel – 1
- River patrol boats – 4
- Tanker – 1
- Degaussing vessel – 1
- Command ship – 1
- RIB 720 rigid inflatable boat – 10

=== Firearms ===
- Zastava M19 assault rifle
- Zastava M84 machine gun
- Zastava M72 light machine gun
- Zastava M93 anti-materiel rifle
- Zastava M91 sniper rifle

== Ranks ==
=== Officers ===
The rank insignia of commissioned officers.

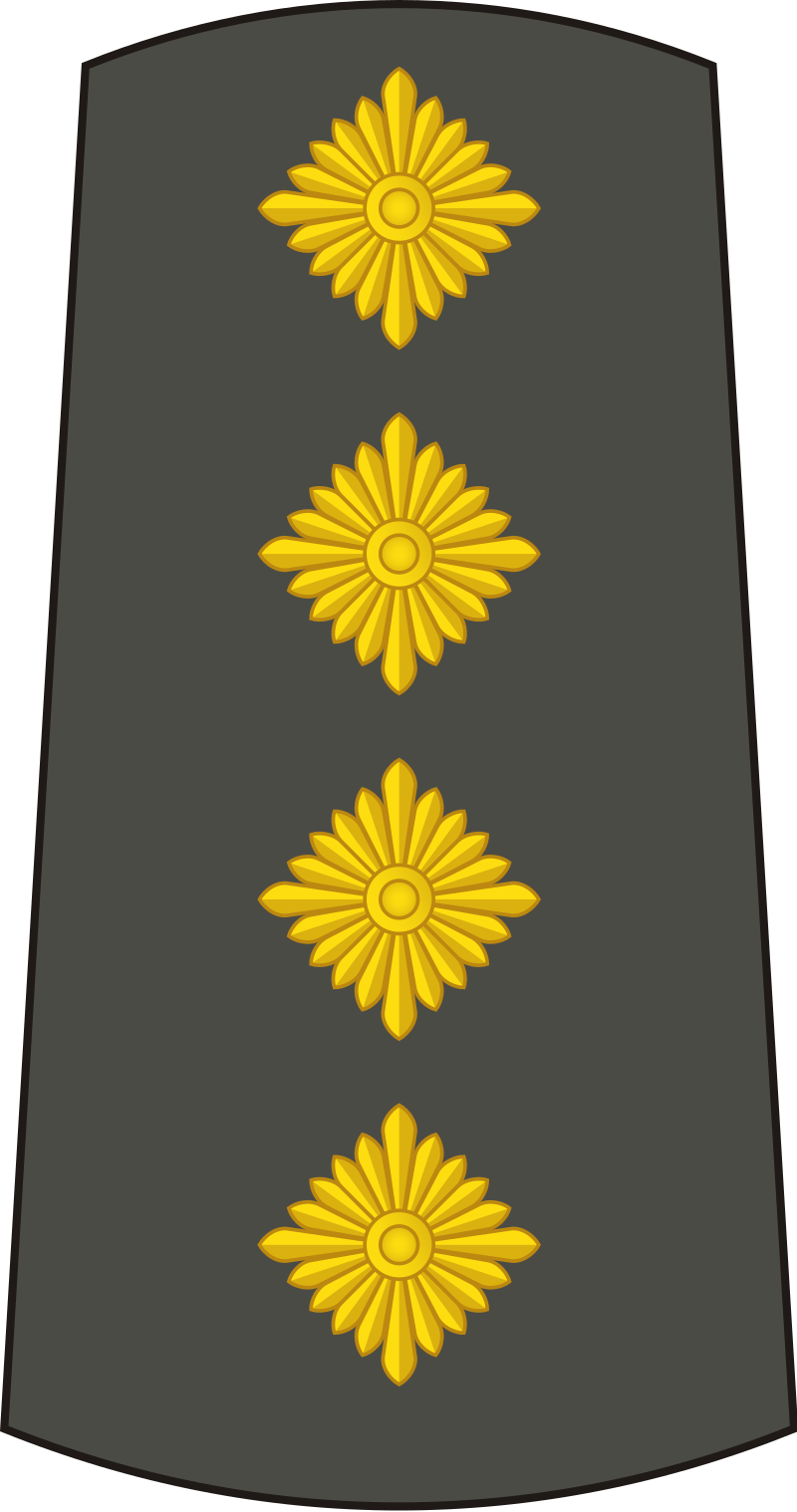
| Rank group | General / flag officers | | | | Senior officers | | | Junior officers |
|---|---|---|---|---|---|---|---|---|---|---|---|
| Serbian Army |
| Serbian Army | Генерал; General | Генерал-потпуковник; General-potpukovnik | Генерал-мајор; General-major | Бригадни генерал Brigadni general | Пуковник; Pukovnik | Потпуковник; Potpukovnik | Мајор; Major | Капетан прве класе Kapetan prve klase | Капетан; Kapetan | Поручник; Poručnik | Потпоручник; Potporučnik |
| Rank group | General / flag officers | | | | Senior officers | | | Junior officers |

=== Enlisted ===
The rank insignia of non-commissioned officers and enlisted personnel.

| Rank group | Senior NCOs | | | | | Junior NCOs | | Enlisted |
|---|---|---|---|---|---|---|---|---|---|
| Serbian Army |
| Serbian Army | Заставник I класе Zastavnik I klase | Заставник; Zastavnik | Старији Водник I класе Stariji Vodnik I klase | Старији Водник; Stariji Vodnik | Водник; Vodnik | Млађи водник Mlađi vodnik | Десетар; Desetar | Разводник; Razvodnik | Војник; Vojnik |
| Rank group | Senior NCOs | | | | | Junior NCOs | | Enlisted |

== See also ==
- Royal Serbian Army
- Royal Yugoslav Army
- Yugoslav Ground Forces
- Ground Forces of Serbia and Montenegro
