= Military Base "South" =

Serbian Army base

- near Bujanovac in Serbia

Site information
- Type: Military base
- Owner: Ministry of Defence of Serbia
- Controlled by: Serbian Army

Location
- Location in Serbia
- Coordinates: 42.4208°N 21.7519°E
- Area: 22,000 square meters

Site history
- Built: 2003–2009
- In use: 2009–present

Garrison information
- Current commander: Colonel Slobodan Stopa
- Garrison: 4th Army Brigade

Military Base "South" (Serbian: Војна база "Југ", romanized: Vojna baza "Jug") is a major Serbian military installation home to the 4th Army Brigade of the Serbian Army, located on the Cepotina Hill, 5 kilometers southeast of Bujanovac, Serbia.

== Details ==
The base covers 35 hectares, with 44 buildings covering an area of 22,000 square meters and is able to accommodate on permanent basis around 1,000 soldiers. It provides training, logistics, recreation, and sport facilities for the members of the 4th Army Brigade. It also houses a service for maintenance of vehicles, shooting ranges, and a heliport. The complex includes heliport, ambulance, and a dental clinic.

The construction works of the base took seven years, and the base opened in 2009. The total investment size amounted to some 1.7 billion Serbian dinars (around 20.5 million US dollars) and is the largest military facility built in Serbia since the breakup of Yugoslavia. During the 2010s, the base expanded on 96 hectares of land in its vicinity, used for training of Serbian contingents in the UN peacekeeping operations.

== See also ==
- 4th Army Brigade
