= Osica (drone) =

Serbian loitering munition

General information
- Type: Loitering munition
- National origin: Serbia
- Manufacturer: Utva Aviation Industry
- Designer: Military Technical Institute
- Status: In service
- Primary user: Serbian Army

History
- Manufactured: 2023–present
- Introduction date: 2025
- First flight: 2023

Osica (Serbian: Осица, lit. 'Wasp') is a Serbian loitering munition and small tactical unmanned aerial vehicle (UAV) designed for precision strikes against light armored targets and infrastructure.

== History ==
The system was developed by the Military Technical Institute in cooperation with Utva Aviation Industry.

The Osica was first showcased at the 2023 Partner (international weapons trade fair) and then specifically showcased in 2023 during the Vihor 2023 exercise at the Pasuljanske Livade military training ground.

== Characteristics ==
The Osica is a fully autonomous loitering unmanned aerial system primarily designed for attack missions, also known as a suicide unmanned aerial vehicle.

The Osica has single-use warhead, i.e. guided ordnance designed to destroy armored targets on the ground with a cumulative warhead. It was created by integrating a warhead from the M79 Osa hand-held launcher onto the aircraft platform.

Osica 2 has option to be launched from containers and for anti armor units. BOV 1 is equipped with Osica 2. Osica 2 has range of 25 km.

=== Specifications ===
- Weight: 7,5 kg
- Speed: 120 km/h
- Altitude: up to 500 m
- Endurance: 30 minutes
- Range: 20 km
- Warhead: 2 kg, capable of penetrating 500 mm of rolled homogeneous armor
- Guidance: electro-optical camera with target tracking function
- Operation: wireless radio link

== Operators ==
- Serbia – Serbian Army

== See also ==
- Gavran 145
- Komarac
