= IDEX =

IDEX can refer to several things, including:

- International Defence Exhibition, a biennial arms and defense technology sales exhibition
- IDEX Corporation, a publicly listed company that makes fluidics systems and specialty engineered products
- Ideanomics, a publicly traded company that trades under the IDEX ticker symbol.
- Idex ASA, a Norwegian biometrics company
- Independent Dual Extrusion, a 3D printing technology
- Integrated Daily Execution, a daily meeting in organisations to deploy operational performance initiatives.
