= Vrabac (drone) =

Serbian reconnaissance drone

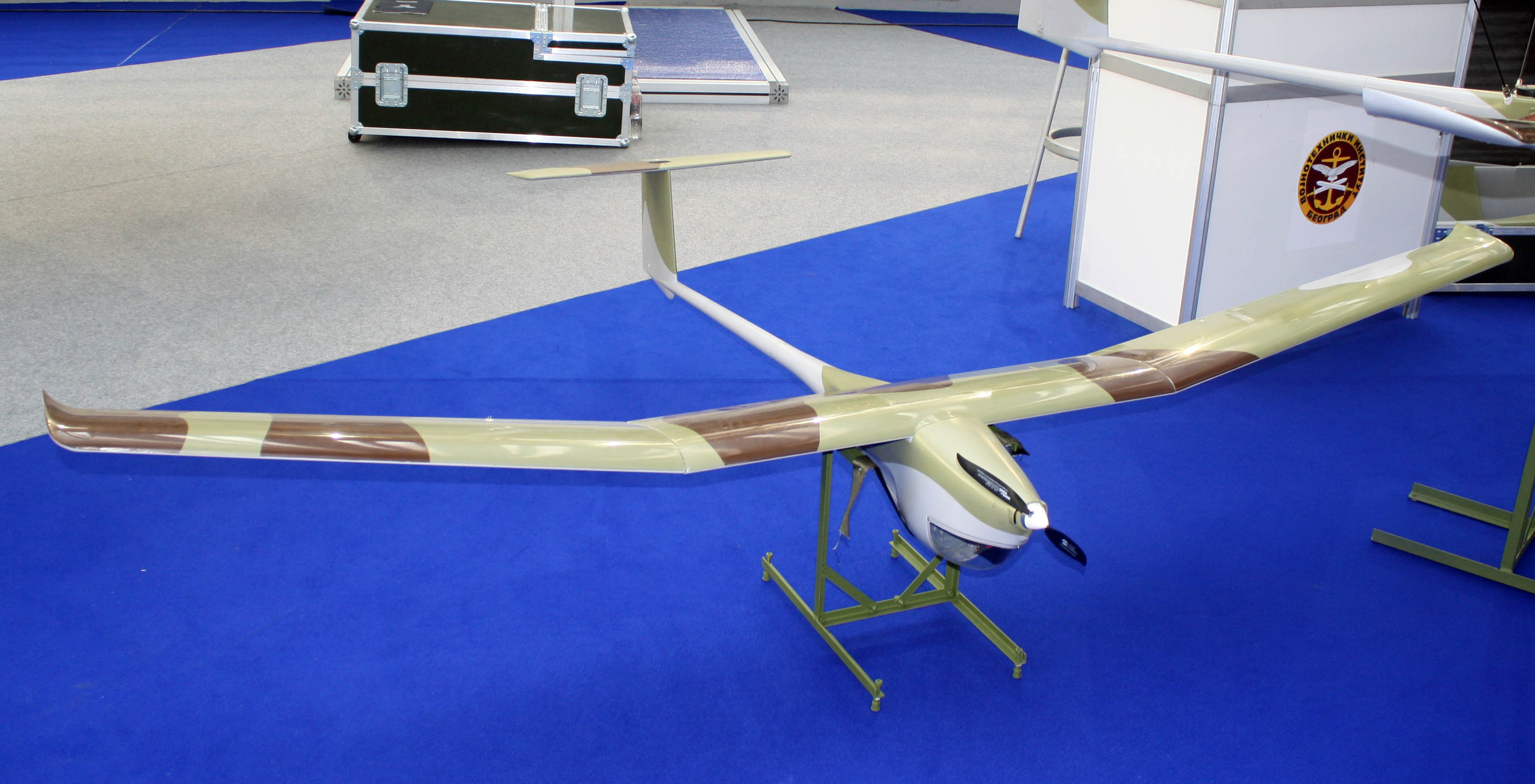

General information
- Type: Unmanned surveillance and reconnaissance aerial vehicle
- Manufacturer: Utva Aviation Industry
- Designer: Military Technical Institute
- Status: In service
- Primary user: Serbian Armed Forces
- Number built: >50

History
- Manufactured: 2020–present
- Introduction date: 2020
- First flight: 2013

The Vrabac (Serbian: Врабац, lit. 'Sparrow') is a Serbian unmanned aerial vehicle intended for day/night reconnaissance and surveillance at shorter distances, as well as for target-spotting and designation, designed by the Military Technical Institute and manufactured by the Utva Aviation Industry.

== History ==
The Vrabac was first showcased at the Partner 2013 military exhibition and entered service with the Serbian Army in 2020.

== Design ==
The Vrabac is hand-launched and lands with a parachute and an airbag. It is designed to survey and analyze major infrastructural facilities such as pipelines, major roads, bridges, forests, etc.

The Vrabac is a high-wing monoplane made of composite materials. Its fuselage is aerodynamically shaped around the equipment. The nose part contains an 800W DC motor powered by a Li-pol battery while the space below and behind it is intended for electro-optical equipment. The airborne computer is in the central part.

Vrabac weighs 5.3 kg with a 2.80 meters wing span. It can carry a payload of maximum of 1.5 kg. It has a total of 1 hour flying time and has a maximum flight speed of 85 km/h. The operational range of the Vrabac is >10 km, and its operating height is 300 to 500 meters.

=== Specifications ===
- Length: 1,9 m
- Wingspan: 2,8 m
- Weight: 9 kg
- Launch: automatic, hand launch
- Recovery: automatic, parachute and airbag
- Engine: electric motor
- Speed: 85 km/h
- Altitude: 500 m
- Endurance: 1 hour
- Range: 50 km
- Guidance: electro-optical/infrared camera
- Operation: real-time telemetry downlink to ground control station

== Variant ==
In 2022, an armed version was revealed that can be equipped with six 40 mm M22 munitions.

== Operators ==
- Serbia
  - Serbian Armed Forces

== Gallery ==
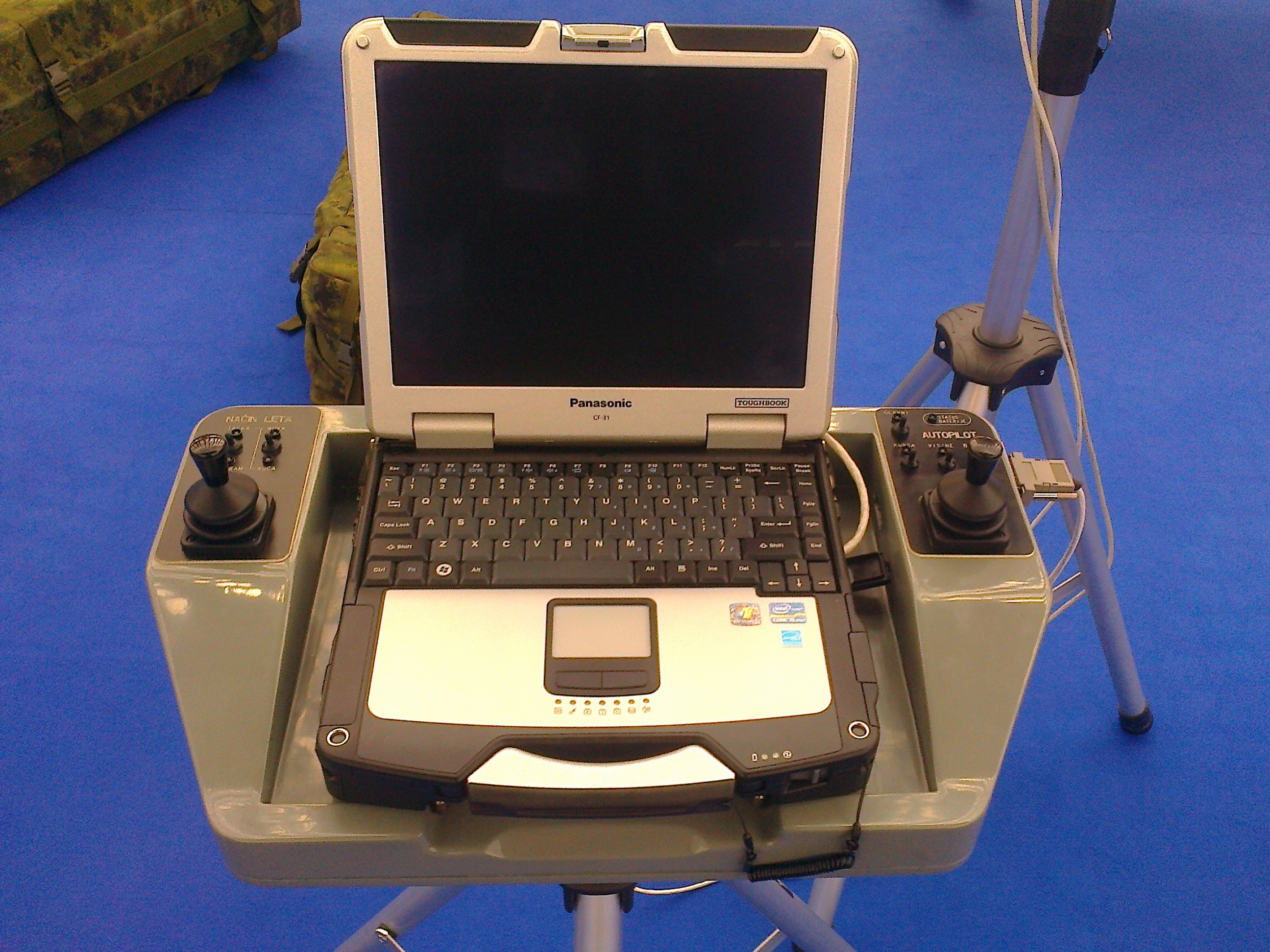
Vrabac control panel at the 2013 Partner international weapons trade fair

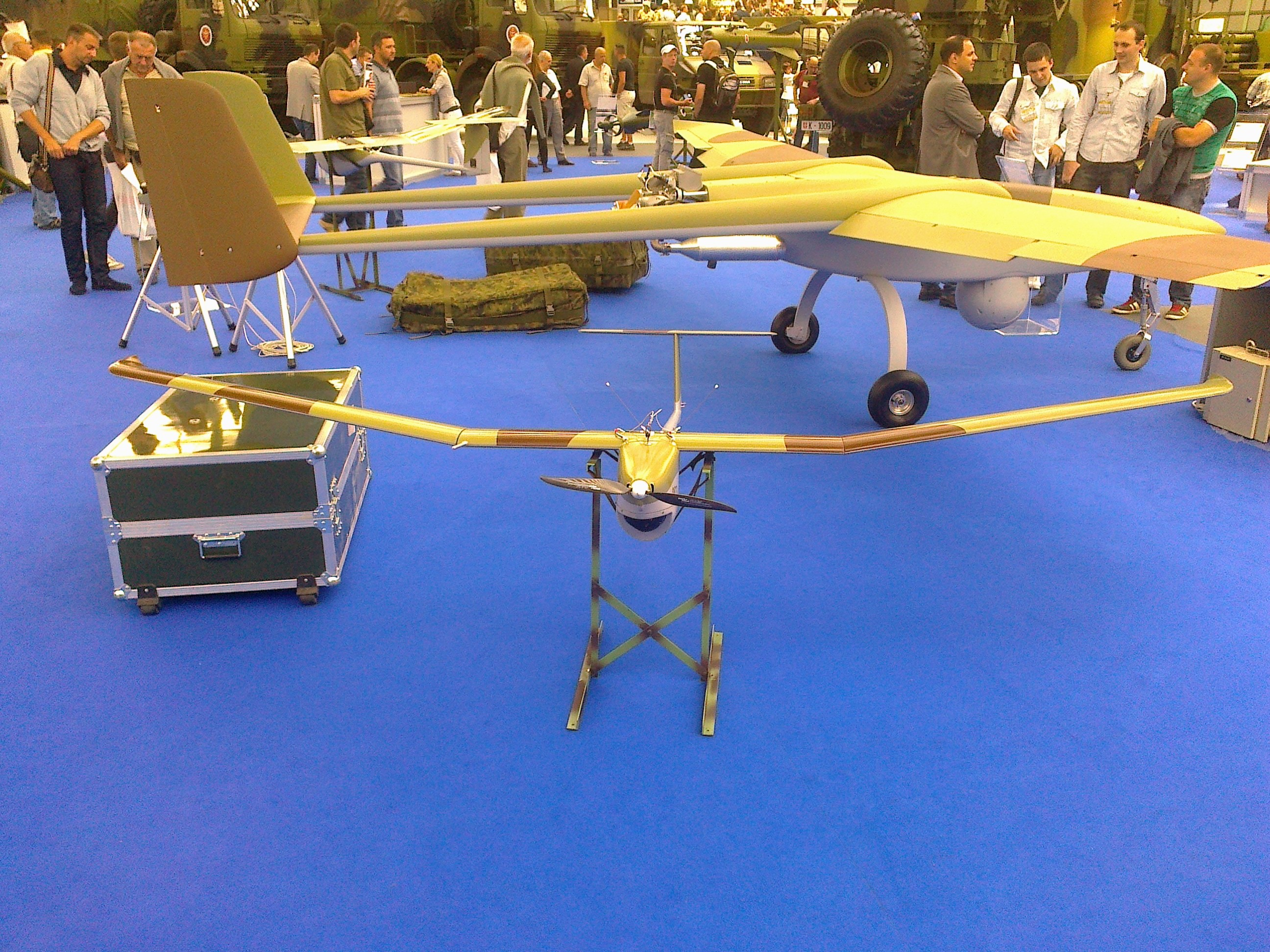
Vrabac next to Pegaz at the 2013 Partner international weapons trade fair

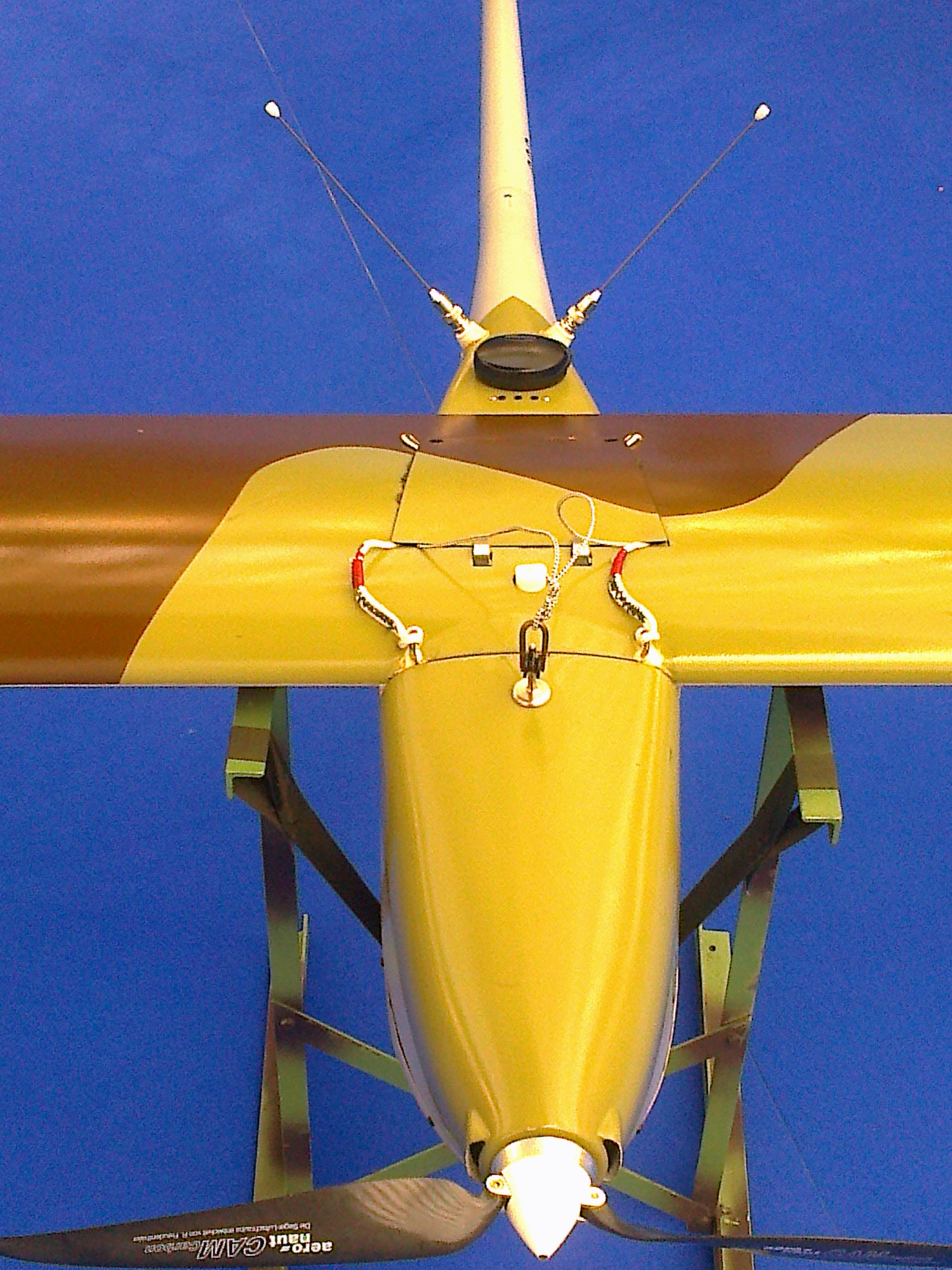
Vrabac top view at the 2013 Partner international weapons trade fair

== See also ==
- Pegaz
- Komarac
