= Zastava M20 MRAP =

Serbian mine-resistant ambush protected vehicle

Zastava M20
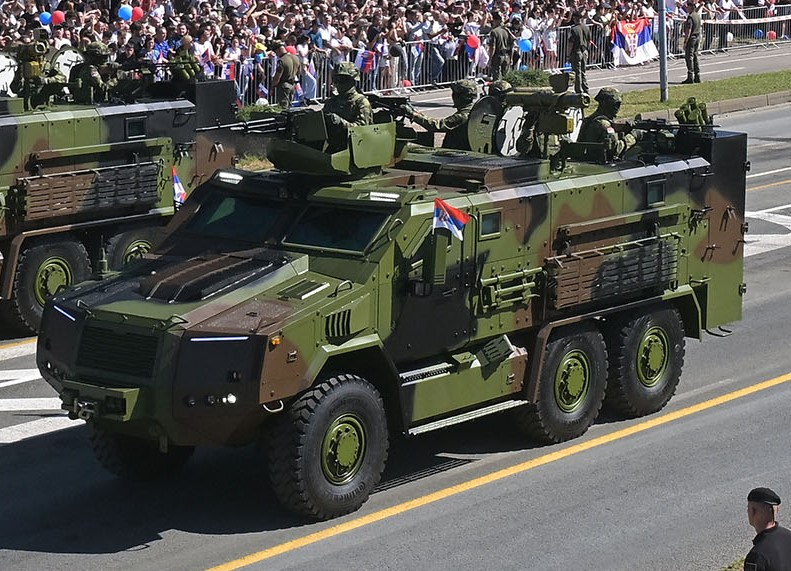
- Zastava M20 MRAP
- Type: mine-resistant ambush protected vehicle (MRAP)
- Place of origin: Serbia

Service history
- In service: 2023–
- Used by: Serbia

Production history
- Manufacturer: Zastava Tervo
- Unit cost: $500,000
- Produced: 2020–
- No. built: 22

Specifications
- Mass: 16,500 kg (36,400 lb)
- Length: 8.6 m (28 ft)
- Width: 2.5 m (8 ft 2 in)
- Height: 2.6 m (8 ft 6 in)
- Crew: 3 (+12 passengers)
- Armor: Level IV STANAG
- Main armament: 12.7mm machine gun
- Engine: 340 hp (250 kW)
- Drive: 6x6 wheeled
- Operational range: 600 km (370 mi)
- Maximum speed: 100 km/h (62 mph)

The Zastava M20 is a mine-resistant ambush protected vehicle (MRAP) produced by Zastava TERVO. Together with the Lazar 3 armored personnel carrier, it is used by the Serbian Army for infantry transport.

== History ==
The prototype of the Zastava M20 MRAP was unveiled by the Ministry of Defence of Serbia in 2020. It was developed jointly by the Military Technical Institute, FAP, and Zastava TERVO. The vehicle is based on a FAP 2228 6x6 chassis and uses a Cummins ISLe 8.9 engine (power 340 HP), an Allison 3000S gearbox and a ZF Steyr 1600/396 drive distributor. It can develop a speed of 95 km/h and overcome climbs of up to 60%. With a full tank (of 200 liters) it can travel up to 600 km. The first batch of 10 vehicles was delivered to the Serbian Army in 2023. The Serbian Army expressed interest in procuring up to 224 of these vehicles.

== Operators ==
- Serbia: The Serbian Army operates 22 vehicles, with additional procurement planned.
