= BOV M16 Miloš =

Serbian multipurpose armoured vehicle

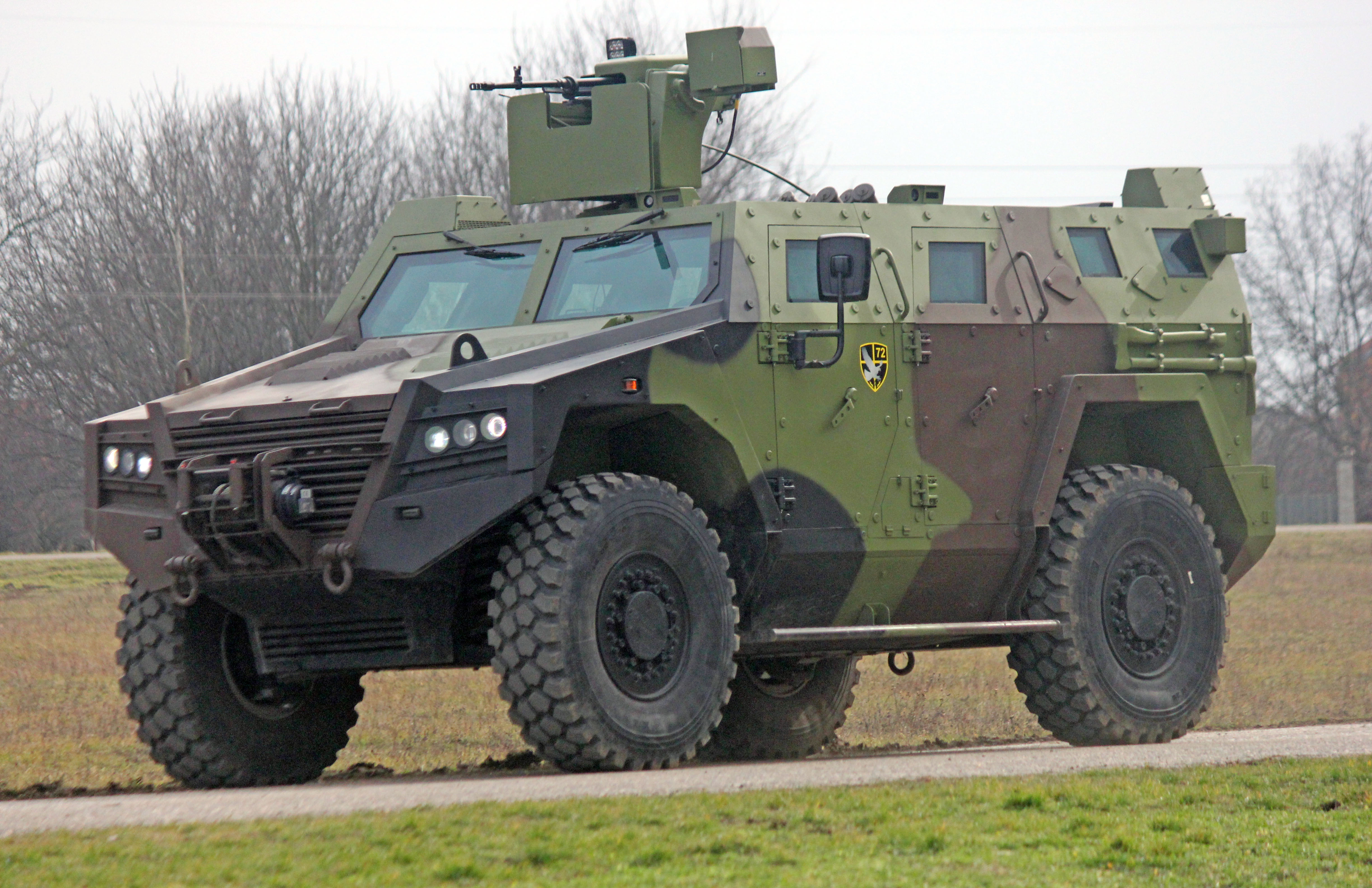
- BOV M16 Miloš with RCWS turret
- Type: Infantry mobility vehicle
- Place of origin: Serbia

Service history
- In service: 2019–present
- Used by: See Operators

Production history
- Designer: Yugoimport SDPR
- Designed: 2015
- Manufacturer: Yugoimport SDPR
- Produced: 2017–present
- No. built: 80+
- Variants: See Variants

Specifications
- Mass: 14 tonnes
- Length: 5.45 m (17 ft 11 in)
- Width: 2.51 m (8 ft 3 in)
- Height: 2.30 m (7 ft 7 in)
- Crew: 8
- Armor: Level III on the front side STANAG 4569.; Level II on the other sides STANAG 4569.; Levels IIa and IIb STANAG 4569 of anti-mine protection.
- Main armament: 12.7 mm/7.62 mm
- Engine: Cummins ISB 300 diesel engine 300 hp
- Suspension: 4×4 wheeled
- Maximum speed: 110 km/h (68 mph)

The BOV M16 Miloš is a Serbian 4x4 multipurpose armoured vehicle, designed for a wide range of military, law enforcement, and peacekeeping operations. Introduced in 2017 and named after the Serbian national hero Miloš Obilić, it emphasizes high mobility, modular protection, and versatility, making it suitable for tasks like patrolling, reconnaissance, and special forces support.

== Design ==
The M16 Miloš is based on a chassis with self-supporting V-hull integrating floating-floor plates, and blast-mitigation seating to protect occupants against land mines and improvised explosive devices (IEDs). It has modern drive assemblies with T700 drive line that has been developed by Timoney and Texelis with independent suspension system which ensures high mobility in any terrain and weather conditions thus enabling maximum combat weight of 14 tons. With use of twenty-inch aluminum rims vehicle gains clearance of the 420mm thus allowing high mobility and better off-road capability. M16 Miloš can climb forward slopes up to 60%, drive on side slopes of 30%, and successfully cross trenches up to 0,9m wide. Can cross over water 1 meter deep without preparation. Vehicle has turning radius of 9 meters.

The standard version of the combat vehicle accommodates eight member crew, out of which four members are accommodated in the rear part of the vehicle. Fast disembarking and embarking is carried out through the rear hydraulic ramp or the rear door. Members in the front part of the vehicle have access to four standard side doors.

BOV M16 Miloš could be used for the numerous tactical missions and it can be equipped with different types of weapons and other specialized equipment including air-conditioning and CBRN defense systems, modern communication equipment, command information system, radar for tracking ground or aerial targets, night vision, thermal and other cameras.

Different types of missions includes patrol, reconnaissance, command vehicle, transportation and support units for special operations (in anti-guerrilla, anti-terrorism and anti-tank operations) such as border and territory control and many other tasks.

=== Engine and transmission ===
Cummins ISB 300 hp diesel engine is installed in the front part in conjunction with Allison 3500SP automatic transmission. Such a configuration enables maximum speed of the vehicle to exceed 110 km/h.

=== Protection and Armor ===
The main hull is made of special protected sheet steel. Basic armour gives few different level of protection in various parts of vehicles:

- Level III STANAG 4569 (on the front side).
- Level III STANAG 4569 (on the other sides).
- Level IIa and IIb STANAG 4569 (anti-mine protection).

Additional ballistic protection could be achieved by combining the ballistic plates of the additional armor depending on its purpose. Modular armour characteristic provides fast replacement of the damaged plates in field conditions.

Wheels has "run-flat", feature provided by Tyron with the central tire inflation system, ensuring mobility of the vehicle up to 50 km in a case when tires are seriously damaged.

== Armament ==
Current version has armament with one variant of M15 remote controlled weapon station (RCWS) on the roof of vehicle equipped with 12.7 mm machine gun that can be used against ground targets up to a distance of 2,000m and up to 1,500m for aerial targets. Beside RCWS vehicle has 6 automatic smoke grenade launchers on a roof of vehicle in standard configuration. 12.7mm M15 RCWS has laser range finder, day/night sight through appropriate cameras and wide angle camera for battlefield observation. In 2019 a version with minigun on turret was revealed.

Different types of manually or automatic and remote controlled turrets could be placed including the ones equipped with machine guns of different calibers and/or grenade launchers, long-range anti-tank guided missile systems, as well as air defence rocket systems. Optoelectronics thermal imaging and TV and radar systems can be mounted on separate telescopic masts with different heights when deployed. In addition to possible different turrets, the vehicle has 5 loopholes for firing with personal armament during anti-ambush operations, observation holes with ballistic protection.

== Variants ==
- Patrol vehicle.
- Medivac vehicle.
- Anti-armour vehicle; equipped with Kornet or Nova anti-armour missiles
- Artillery reconnaissance and battery command vehicle with the integrated artillery electronic direction finder and other systems for surveillance and fire control for different types of artillery units

== Operators ==
=== Current operators ===
- Cyprus – 8 in service with Cypriot National Guard as artillery reconnaissance and battery command vehicles for 24 Nora B-52 self-propelled howitzers.
- Serbia
  - Serbian Armed Forces – 110 Miloš vehicles are in operational service with the Serbian Armed Forces, including the 72nd Brigade for Special Operations. Ten vehicles were delivered to the 72nd Brigade in January 2021. In January 2024, the Serbian government announced an order for the production of a further 112 Miloš fighting vehicles.
  - Police of Serbia – Miloš vehicles are operated by the Serbian Ministry of the Interior. Six vehicles were allocated to the Special Anti-Terrorist Unit in 2017.
- Senegal
  - National Gendarmerie – Miloš vehicles are in service and were publicly displayed during Senegal's 2025 Independence Day parade. Serbian media reported that 10 vehicles had been ordered in 2023.

=== Export marketing ===
Yugoimport–SDPR has promoted the Miloš family on the international market. At EDEX 2023 in Cairo, the Miloš and Miloš 2 were among the armoured vehicles prominently exhibited by the company. Official delegations from Egypt, Saudi Arabia, Algeria, Angola, Cameroon, Zimbabwe and the Central African Republic were among those that visited the Serbian pavilion. The Miloš and Miloš 2 were again among Yugoimport's principal armoured-vehicle exhibits at IDEX 2025 in Abu Dhabi.

== Gallery ==
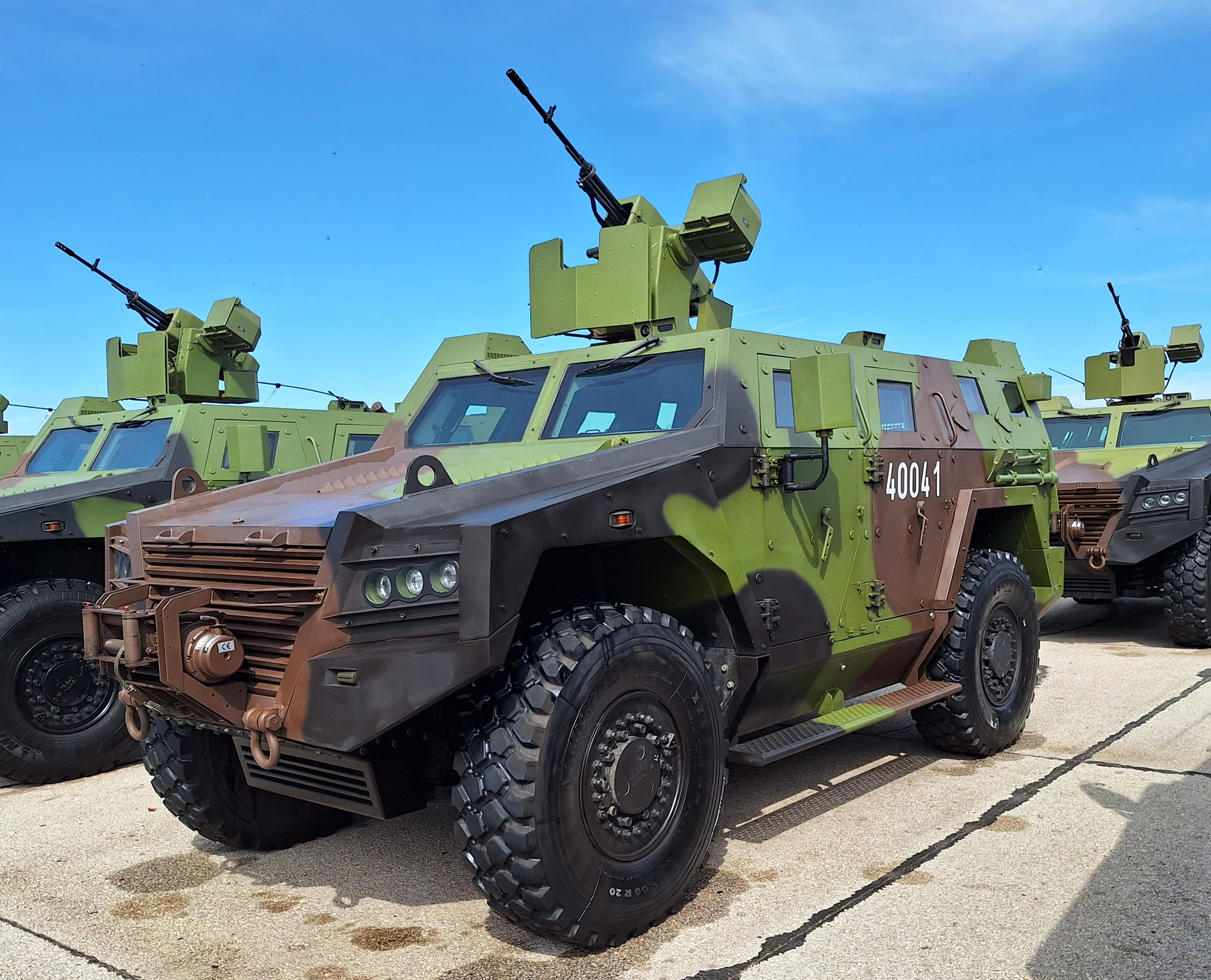
BOV M16 Miloš of the Serbian Army

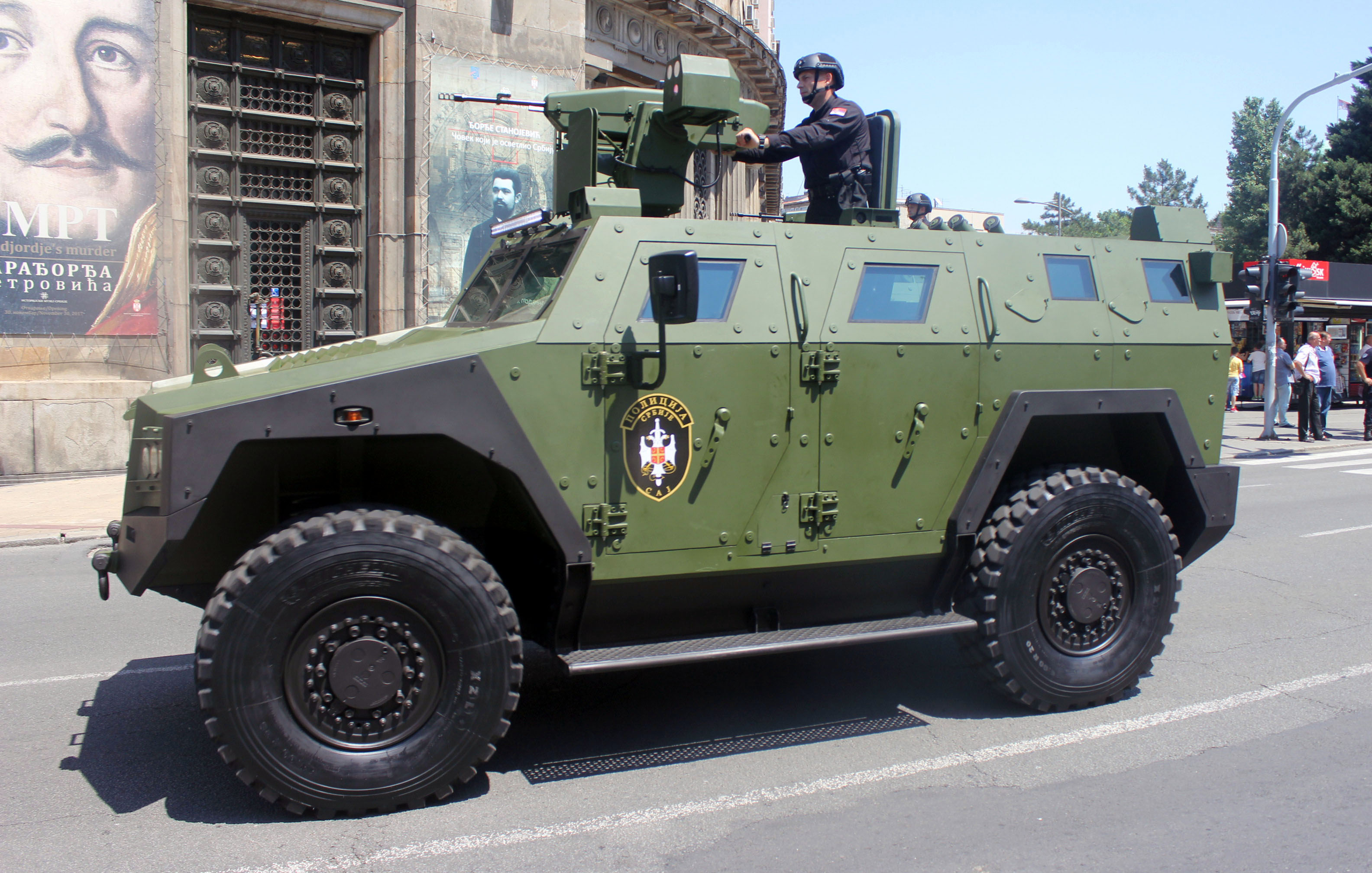
BOV M16 Miloš of the Special Anti-Terrorist unit

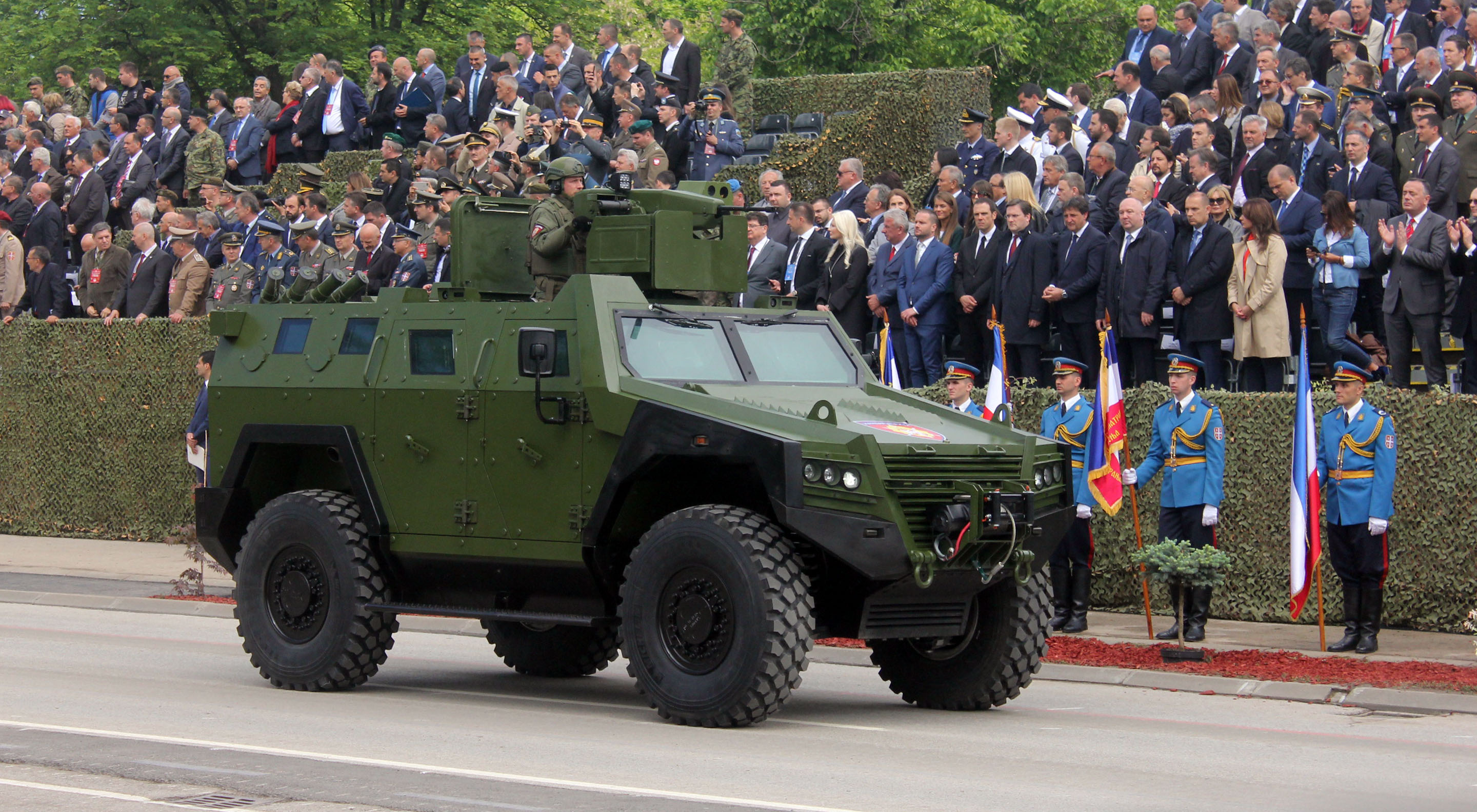
BOV M16 Miloš of the Gendarmery

== See also ==
- Lazar 3
