= Komarac =

Serbian miniature loitering munition

- Komarac-1

General information
- Type: Loitering munition
- National origin: Serbia
- Manufacturer: Utva Aviation Industry
- Designer: Military Technical Institute
- Status: In service
- Primary user: Serbian Army
- Number built: 1,000+

History
- Manufactured: 2022–present
- Introduction date: 2024
- First flight: 2022

The Komarac (Serbian: комарац, lit. 'Mosquito') is a family of Serbian-produced miniature loitering munitions designed by the Military Technical Institute and manufactured by the Utva Aviation Industry.

== History ==
The Komarac family emerged as part of post-2010s modernization of the Serbian Armed Forces.

The Komarac-2 was showcased in 2024 during the "Fire Strike 2024" (Serbian: Vatreni udar 2024) exercise at the Pasuljanske Livade military training ground.

== Characteristics ==
Small enough to fit in a backpack, the Komarac flies to the target area and crashes into its target while detonating its explosive warhead.

The Komarac series consists of Komarac-1 and Komarac-2 miniature loitering munition. Both variants are quadcopter-based, single-use loitering munitions designed for short-range tactical strikes, emphasizing affordability, precision, and portability.

While they share core features like electric propulsion, video-guided control, and activation on impact or remote command, the primary differences lie in their warhead capabilities, intended targets, and overall lethality.

=== Specifications ===
The following are the main specificationsof the Komarac-2:

- Weight: 5 kg
- Altitude: 500 m
- Endurance: 30 minutes
- Range: 20 km
- Warhead: explosive payload capable of penetrating armored targets
- Guidance: electro-optical/infrared sensors for target acquisition
- Operation: wireless radio link

== Operators ==
- Serbia – Serbian Army

== See also ==
- Osica
- Gavran 145
