= Lazar 3 =

Serbian armoured vehicle

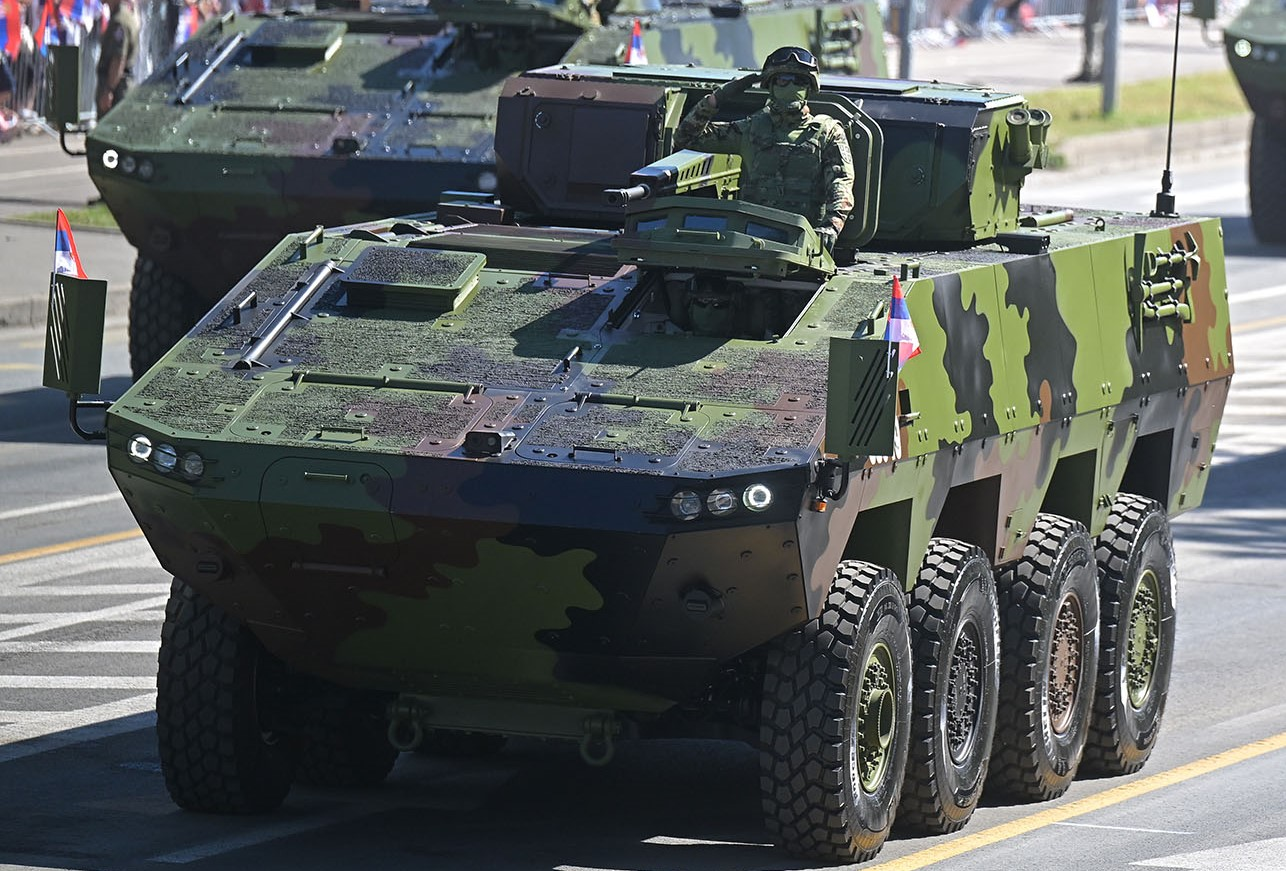
- Lazar 3M infantry fighting vehicle of the Serbian Army
- Type: Armoured personnel carrier Infantry fighting vehicle
- Place of origin: Serbia

Service history
- Used by: See Operators

Production history
- Designer: Yugoimport SDPR
- Designed: 2015
- Manufacturer: Yugoimport SDPR
- Produced: 2017–present
- No. built: 112

Specifications
- Mass: up to 28,000 kg (62,000 lb)
- Length: 7.92 m (26.0 ft)
- Width: 2.95 m (9 ft 8 in); 2.43 m (8 ft 0 in) track width
- Height: 2.32 m (7 ft 7 in)
- Crew: 3 (+9 combat soldiers)
- Armor: STANAG Level III (baseline) up to Level V (frontal)/IV(sides) and smoke grenade launchers for protection
- Main armament: 30 mm auto-cannon (Lazar 3M); 12.7 mm RCWS (Lazar 3)
- Secondary armament: 7.62mm machine gun and anti-tank missiles (Lazar 3M)
- Engine: Diesel; 500 hp (370 kW)
- Drive: 8×8 wheeled
- Suspension: independent suspension
- Operational range: 800 km (500 mi)
- Maximum speed: 110 km/h (68 mph)

The Lazar 3 is the latest version of the Lazar family of armoured vehicles, designed for various applications and missions. It is designed by Serbian defense company Yugoimport SDPR and manufactured at its facility in Velika Plana. Named after the Serbian medieval prince Lazar Hrebeljanović, it comes in two basic variants of armoured personnel carrier and the infantry fighting vehicle.

== History ==
In 2017, the Lazar 3 entered service with the Serbian Armed Forces as an armoured personnel carrier. In 2021, a procurement contract worth 3.7 billion Serbian dinars was announced by the Serbian Armed Forces. The procurement of additional vehicles was announced in 2024. In 2025, the Lazar 3M entered service with the Serbian Armed Forces in the role of an infantry fighting vehicle.

== Design ==
Lazar 3 has a highly sophisticated, modular ballistic protection. The hull is made of armored steel and can be fitted with a spall liner. The applied ballistic protection can be tailored to the specific needs of the user and allows for application of additional state-of-the-art ballistic protection technologies throughout the vehicle service life. The vehicle floor has two levels of anti-mine protection.

The power train is accommodated in the front right-side of the vehicle in a protected space completely separated from the crew. The central transfer case transmits the torque to all wheels that have independent suspension and provide for the vehicle's high mobility. All the shafts provide power, while the first two steer the wheels.

The driver and commander are positioned in the front of the vehicle. They can use side doors for the entrance and exit. Above their seats are hatches, the driver's hatch having a three position lock: one position being designed for locking the cover while driving with the open hatch. The driver and the commander have each three periscopes available for their use in the vehicle. The driver's seat is ergonomic and adjustable in vertical and horizontal planes. The steering column is also adjustable by height and angle. The crew compartment is located in the rear of the vehicle and provides enough space for various missions. This part of the vehicle can be accessed through the rear ramp, through the two doors embedded in this ramp or through the big hatches on the vehicle roof. The ramp is hydraulic-operated by way of the power train. It can be activated both from the driver's compartment and the crew compartment.

The number of the crew depends on the type of a mission and the weapons used in the vehicle. When the vehicle is equipped with the remote control weapon station (RCWS), the vehicle should be manned with 12 troops (commander, driver, gunner + 9 soldiers), while the version with a turret would be manned with one soldier less.

The main differences between Lazar 2 and Lazar 3 are:

- new better modular armour design with possibilities of inserting Spall liner
- if turret is mounted instead 12.7mm RCWS crew is made of 2 and 8 soldiers are carried
- width is increased and now is 2.95m
- Maximum speed is increased to 110 km/h
- Main basic protection from all sides is increased and it's now STANAG 4569 level 3
- Main anti-mine protection is increased and it's now STANAG 4569 level 3a and 3b
- Add-on ballistic protection STANAG 4569 can be up to level 5 on front side
- New features can be selected from by a potential buyer like automatic fire extinguisher

There are many other improvements and modifications done on Lazar 3 over Lazar 2 such as: improved lids and one more lid for engine compartment and a new lid for maintenance on right side of vehicle. Front and back light groups are different, video system for driving is now in protective housing, side windows now have wipers, side mirrors are different, suspension is from other supplier thus improving maximal speed, seats in back compartment are better, it is possible to open rear ramp with a pres of a button from drivers compartment, smoke grenade launcher is now on roof, etc.

== Versions ==
The following versions of Lazar 3 have been developed:

- Lazar 3 - armoured personnel carrier (armed with 12.7mm machine-gun RCWS)
- Lazar 3M - infantry fighting vehicle (armed with 30mm auto-cannon 2A72 RCWS or 30mm 32V01 RCWS)
- Lazar 3 Ambulance - medivac vehicle

== Operators ==
- Serbia
  - Serbian Army – Approximately 80 Lazar 3 vehicles аs of 2025, out of a total order of 125. Lazar 3M vehicles had also entered operational use with units of the Serbian Armed Forces.
  - Gendarmerie – 12 Lazar 3 vehicles as of 2024, including one vehicle equipped with a 30 mm cannon.
- Turkmenistan
  - Ministry of National Security – Lazar III armoured vehicles are in service. The vehicles were publicly displayed as part of the Ministry of National Security's mechanized column during Turkmenistan's 2022 Independence Day parade. Jane's had previously identified two Lazar 3 vehicles at the 2021 Independence Day parade as apparently being in service with the Ministry of National Security. A total of 24 Lazar 3 vehicles were reportedly ordered by Turkmenistan in 2021.

== Gallery ==
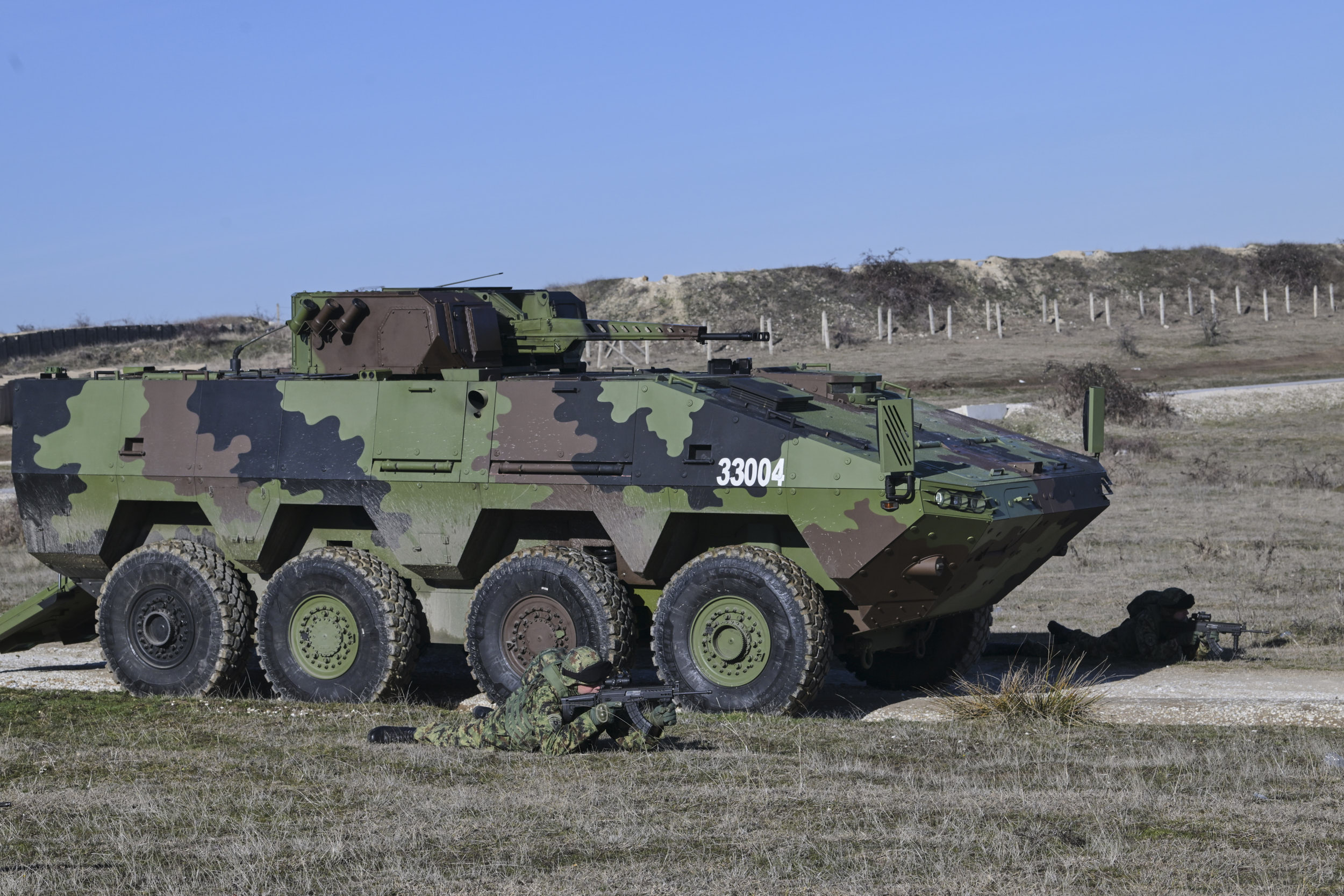
Lazar 3M infantry fighting vehicle

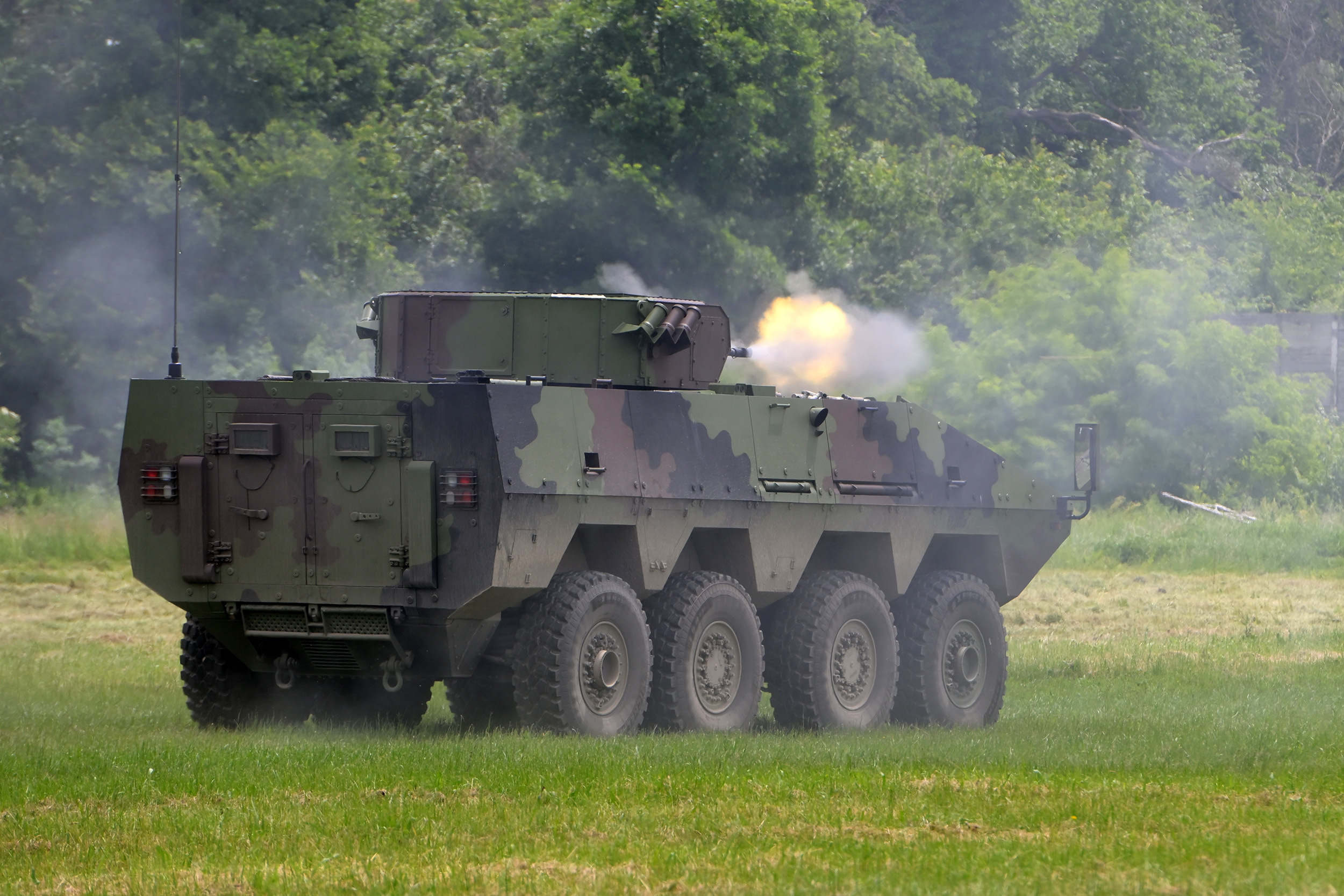
Lazar 3M infantry fighting vehicle

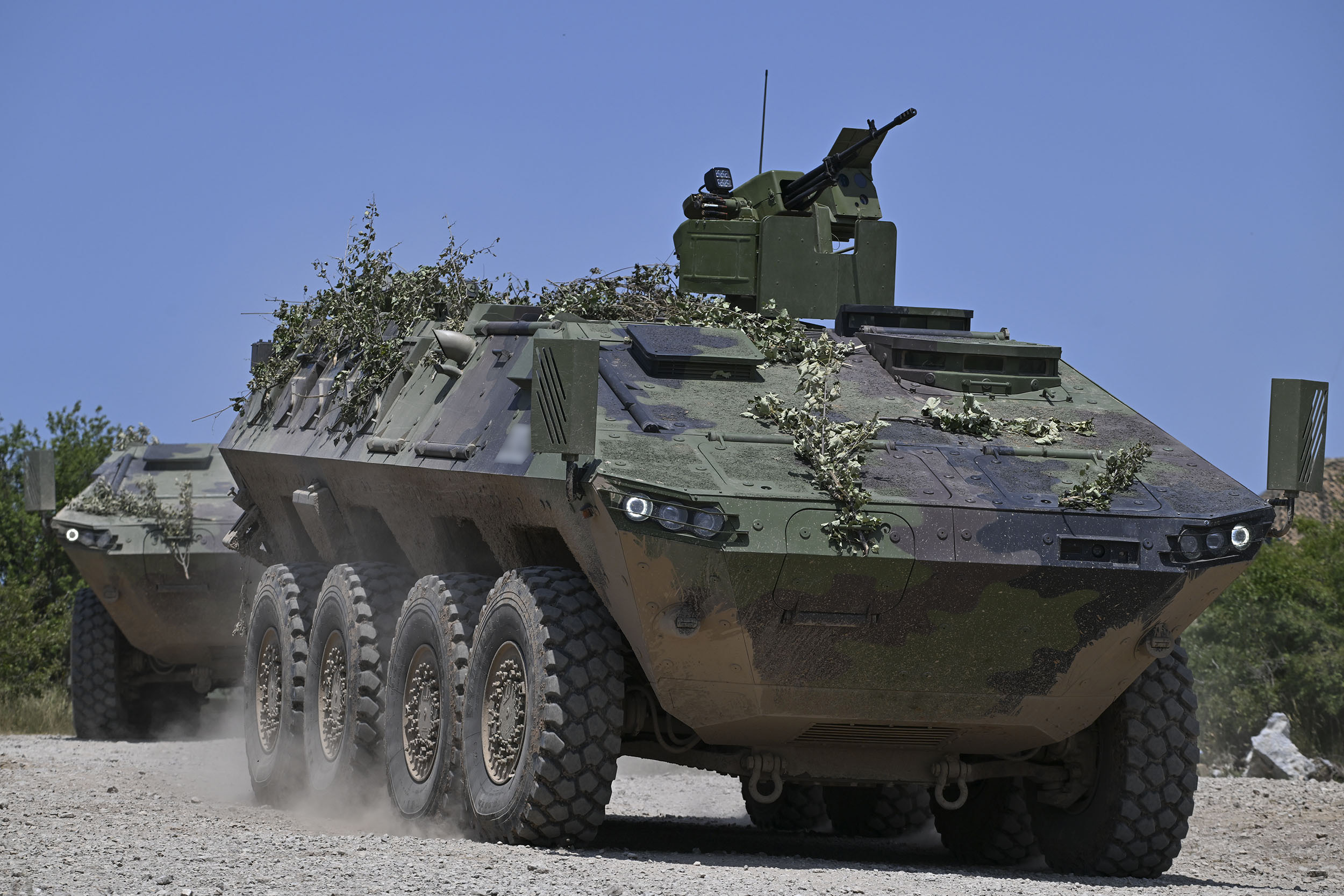
Lazar 3 armoured personnel carrier

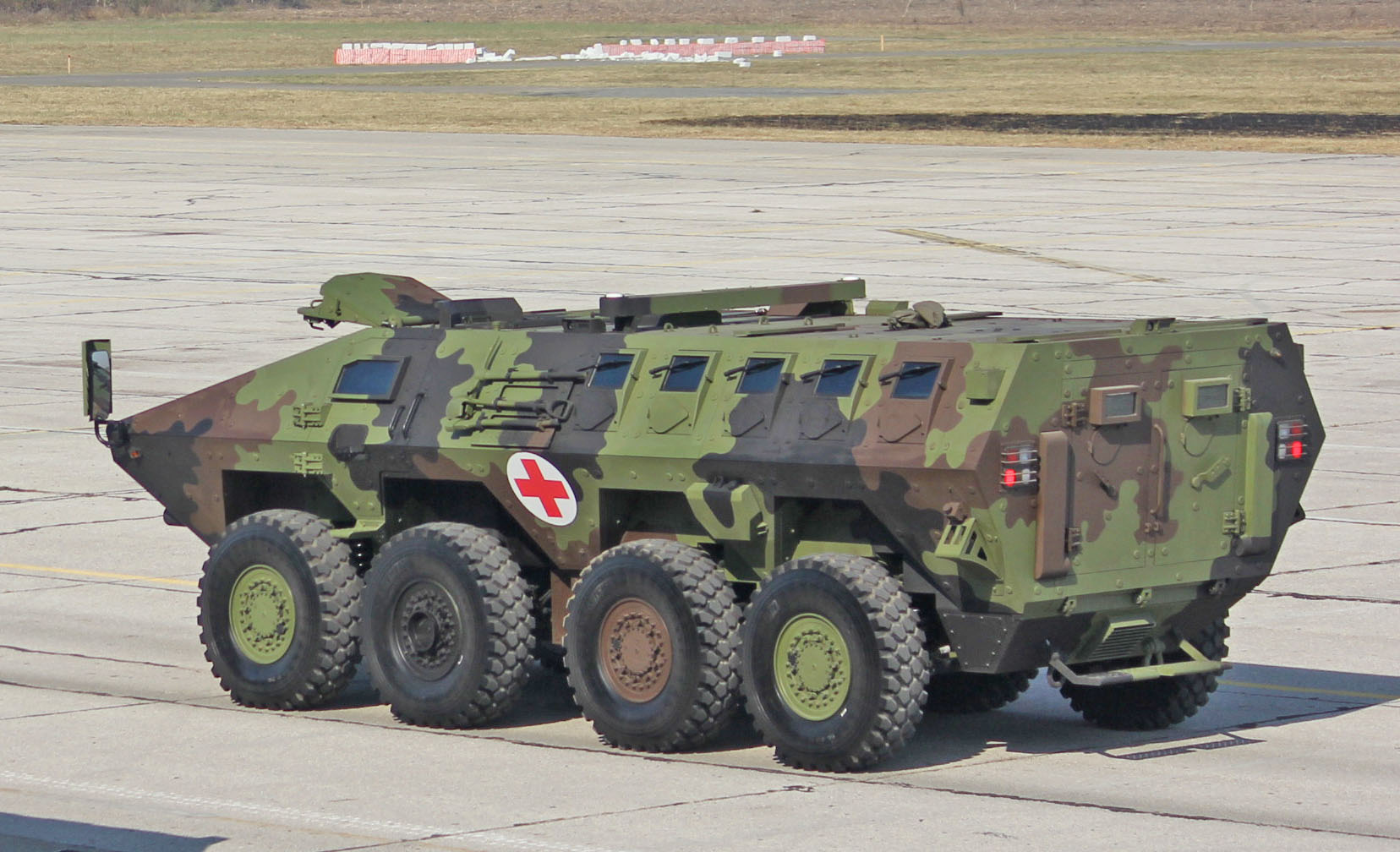
Lazar 3 medivac vehicle

== See more ==
- BOV M16 Miloš – Serbian multipurpose armoured vehicle
- VPK-7829 Bumerang – Russian amphibious armoured personnel carrier
- BTR-90 – Russian armoured personnel carrier
- FNSS Pars – Turkish armoured combat vehicle
- LAV-25 – Canadian/American reconnaissance vehicle
- Otokar Arma – Turkish armoured combat vehicle
- Patria AMV – Finnish wheeled armoured personnel carrier
