= Zastava NTV =

Serbian infantry mobility vehicle

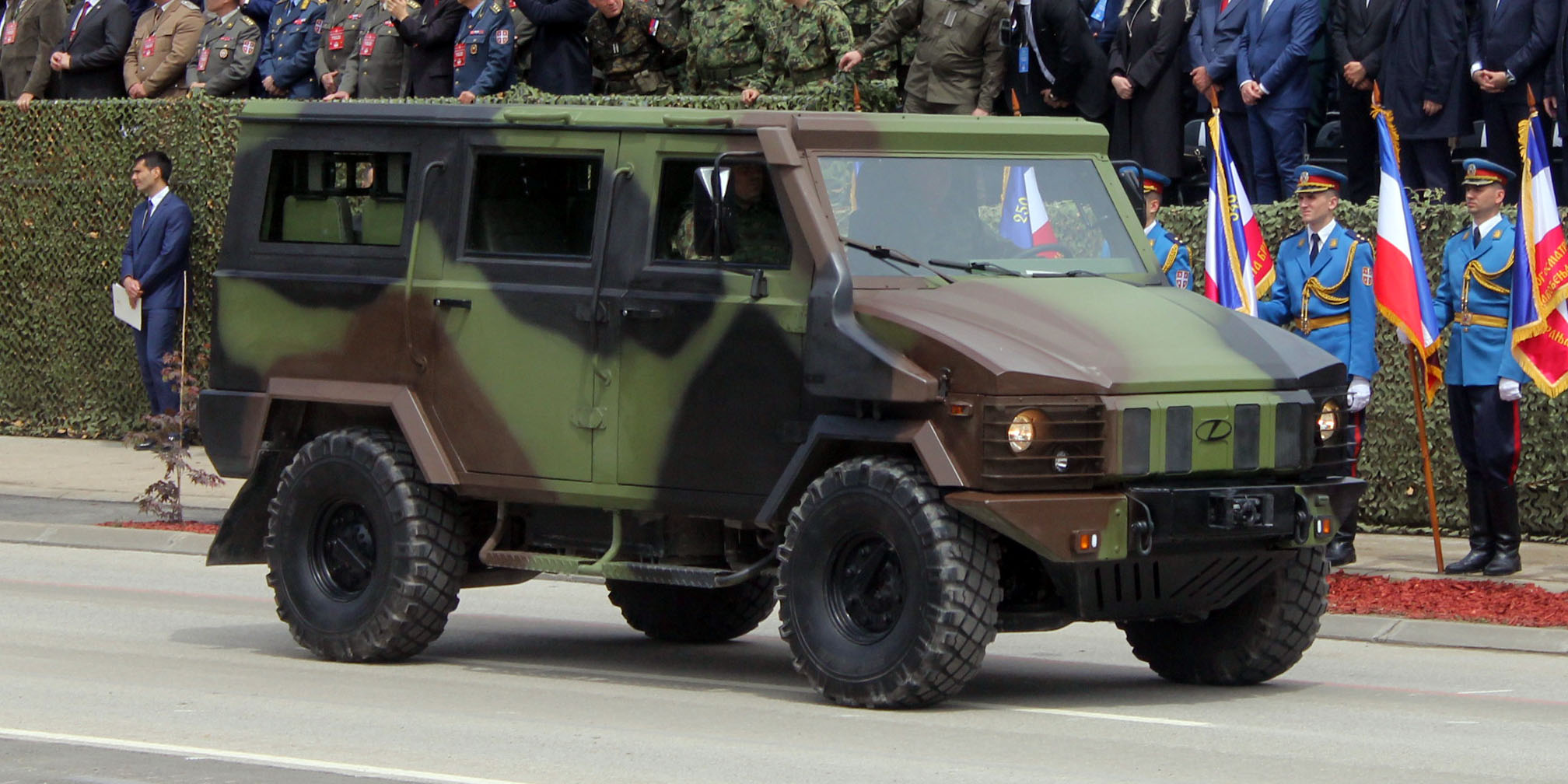
- The Zastava NTV at a 2019 military parade
- Type: Infantry mobility vehicle, 2-door and 4-door truck, 3-door and 5-door station wagon
- Place of origin: Serbia

Service history
- In service: 2016–present
- Used by: See Operators

Production history
- Designer: Military Technical Institute
- Designed: 2011–2017
- Manufacturer: Zastava TERVO
- Produced: 2015–present
- Variants: See Variants

Specifications
- Mass: 3,400 kg (7,500 lb) empty
- Length: 4,830 mm (15.85 ft)
- Width: 2,100 mm (6.9 ft)
- Height: 2,330 mm (7.64 ft)
- Crew: 1+2,1+5, 8+1 depending on variant
- Armor: depending on variants possible use of armored steel plates
- Main armament: depending on variants armed with Zastava M02 Coyote or 30mm grenade launcher
- Engine: Cummins ISF 2.8 2.8 L (170 cu in)
- Payload capacity: 1,400 kg (3,100 lb)
- Transmission: 5S 400 ZF
- Suspension: with semieliptic leaf spring singlefold flexibility, and hydraulic shock
- Ground clearance: 260 mm (0.85 ft)
- Operational range: 600 km (370 mi)
- Maximum speed: 110 km/h (68 mph) on road 80 km/h (50 mph) off-road

The Zastava NTV (Serbian: Ново теренско возило, romanized: Novo terensko vozilo; transl. New Terrain Vehicle) is a Serbian 4x4, multipurpose, all-terrain infantry mobility vehicle designed by the Military Technical Institute and Zastava Trucks, and manufactured by Zastava TERVO. The primary users are the Serbian Armed Forces; the vehicle may also be offered for the export market.

== Design ==
The first prototype vehicle was designed in 2011 by the Military Technical Institute, together with experts from the Faculty of Engineering of the University of Kragujevac and engineers of Zastava Trucks, for equipping the Serbian Armed Forces. It was designed with a modular chassis to transport troops and various equipment quickly on-road and off-road.

Due to its modular chassis, many different variants were developed from 2011 to 2017. It was adopted for the Serbian Armed Forces and for export after undergoing extensive on-road and off-road tests by the Technical Testing Center. It is designed to perform in mountains, valleys, forests, as well as snowy, moist, cold and hot environments, and is capable of operating at different ambient temperatures ranging from −25–40 °C (−13–104 °F). The vehicle has approach and departure angles of 35° each. It can negotiate longitudinal slopes of 60% and transverse slopes of 35%, and can ford at 0.7 m (2.3 ft) deep in water.

The vehicle can transport 1.4 tonnes of internal cargo and can carry a 1.7-ton trailer. For example, it could carry 32 wooden boxes with sixty-four 120 mm mortar mines that weighs 1408 kg and tow 120 mm mortar.

In its basic variants, it has a Cummins 2.8 turbocharged diesel engine with intake air cooler and a five-gear ZF 5S 400 synchronous mechanical gearbox. It is equipped with ABS, EBD and ABD for braking. It is configured as 4x4 with permanent all-wheels drive with electric blockade command for separator drive and separate electric differential commands for front and rear bridge. It has 255/100 R16 radial tubeless tires with run flat as option.

== Versions ==
There are three different versions of NTV:

- 40.13H - 2+1
- 40.13H Extended Cab - 8+1
- 40.13H - 5+1

Thanks to its modular design, it can be equipped as ambulance, workshop, command and control, military communications, military police, transport, reconnaissance, ground and air radar, sound surveillance and armed version.

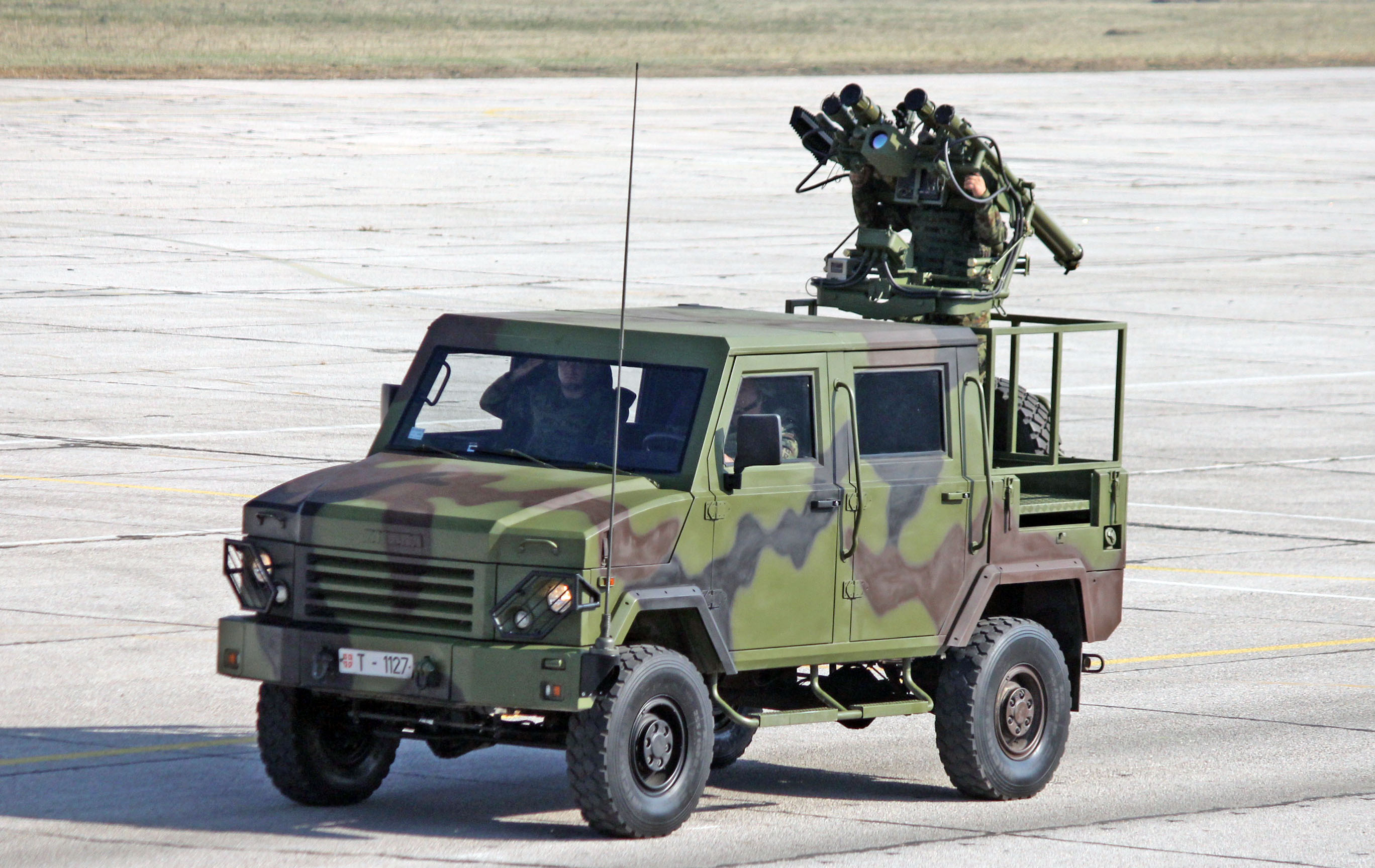
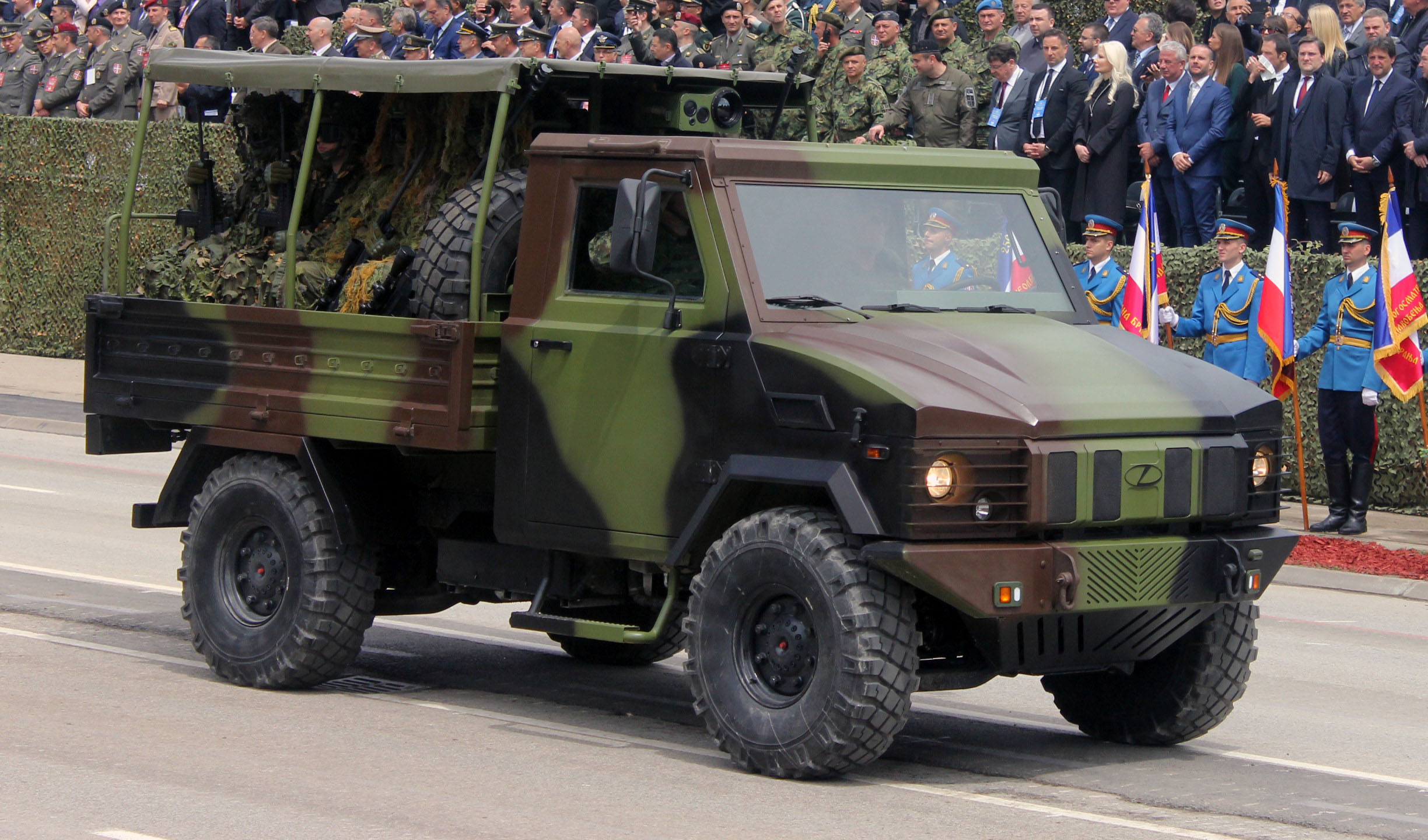

=== Armed ===
The 40.13H was presented as an armed variant at the Partner 2017 arms exhibition, featuring either a Zastava M-93 30mm automatic grenade launcher or a Zastava M02 Coyote 12.7mm heavy machine gun. A better-armed version with a more powerful, commercial-grade engine has also been offered to customers. It is also possible to equip the vehicle with the M-15 remote-controlled weapons station.

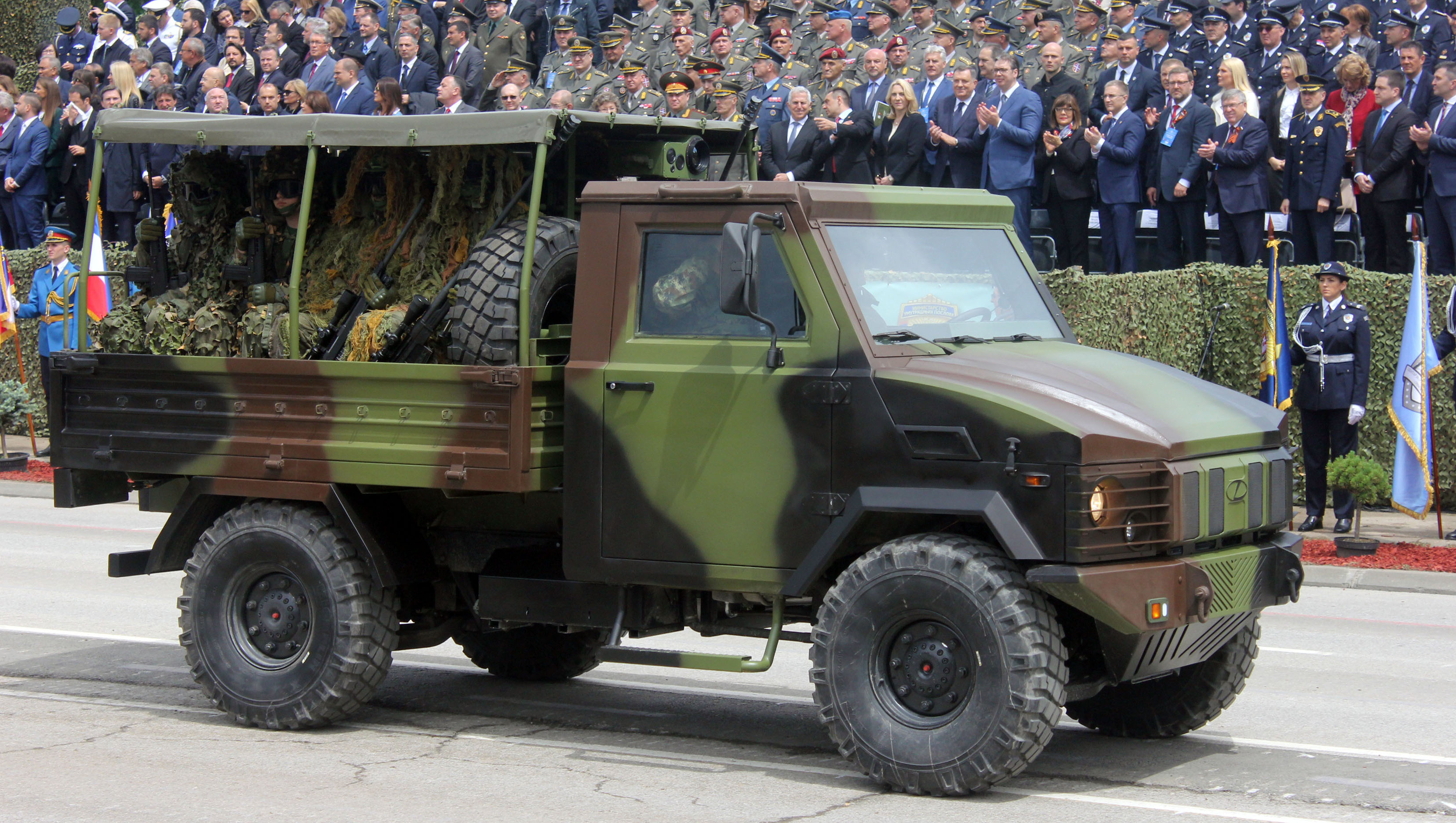
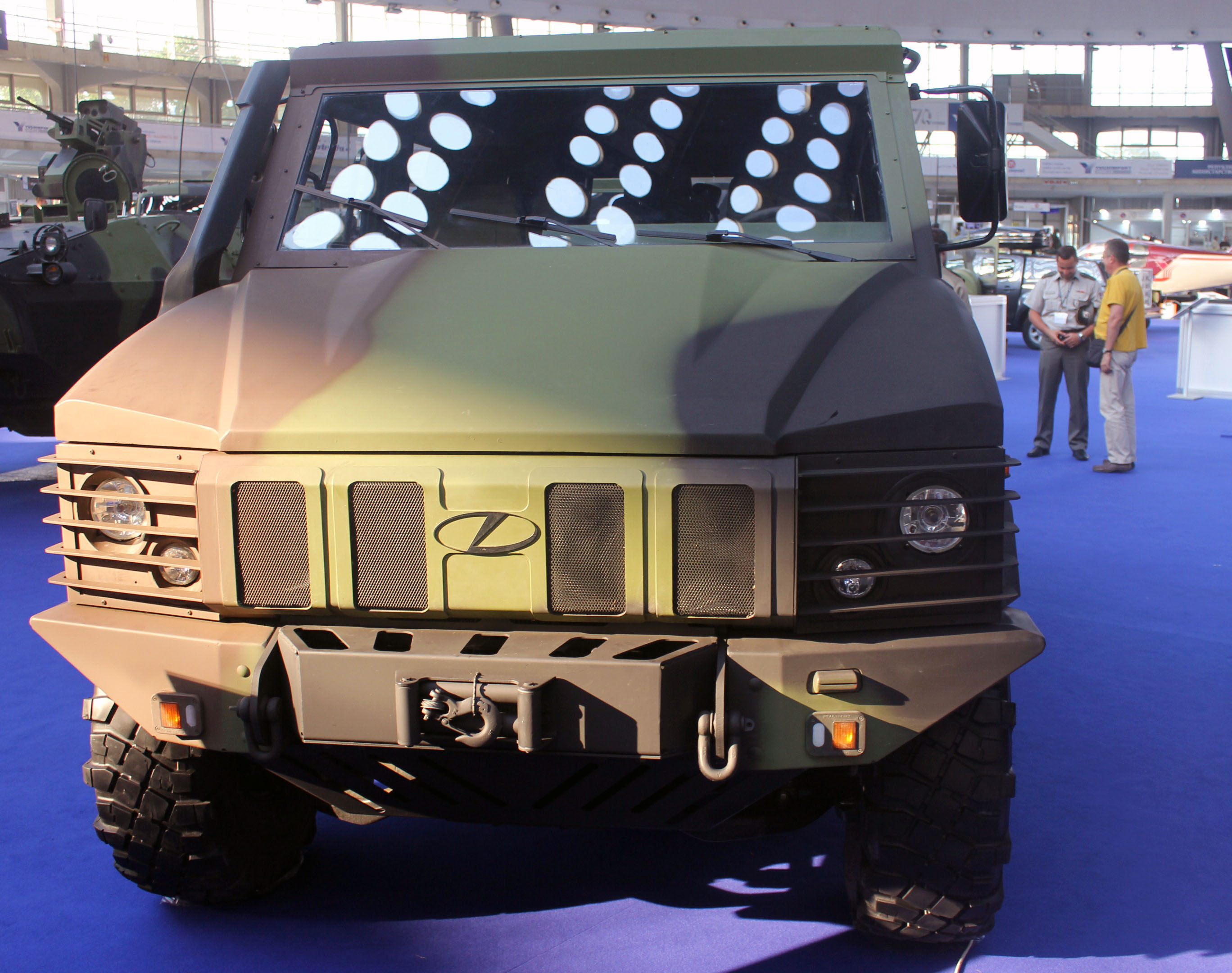

== Operators ==
- Serbia – 20+ in the Serbian Armed Forces.

== See also ==
- Iveco LMV
- Toyota Mega Cruiser
- URO VAMTAC
- Tigr (Russian military vehicle)
- Nimr
