= PASARS-16 =

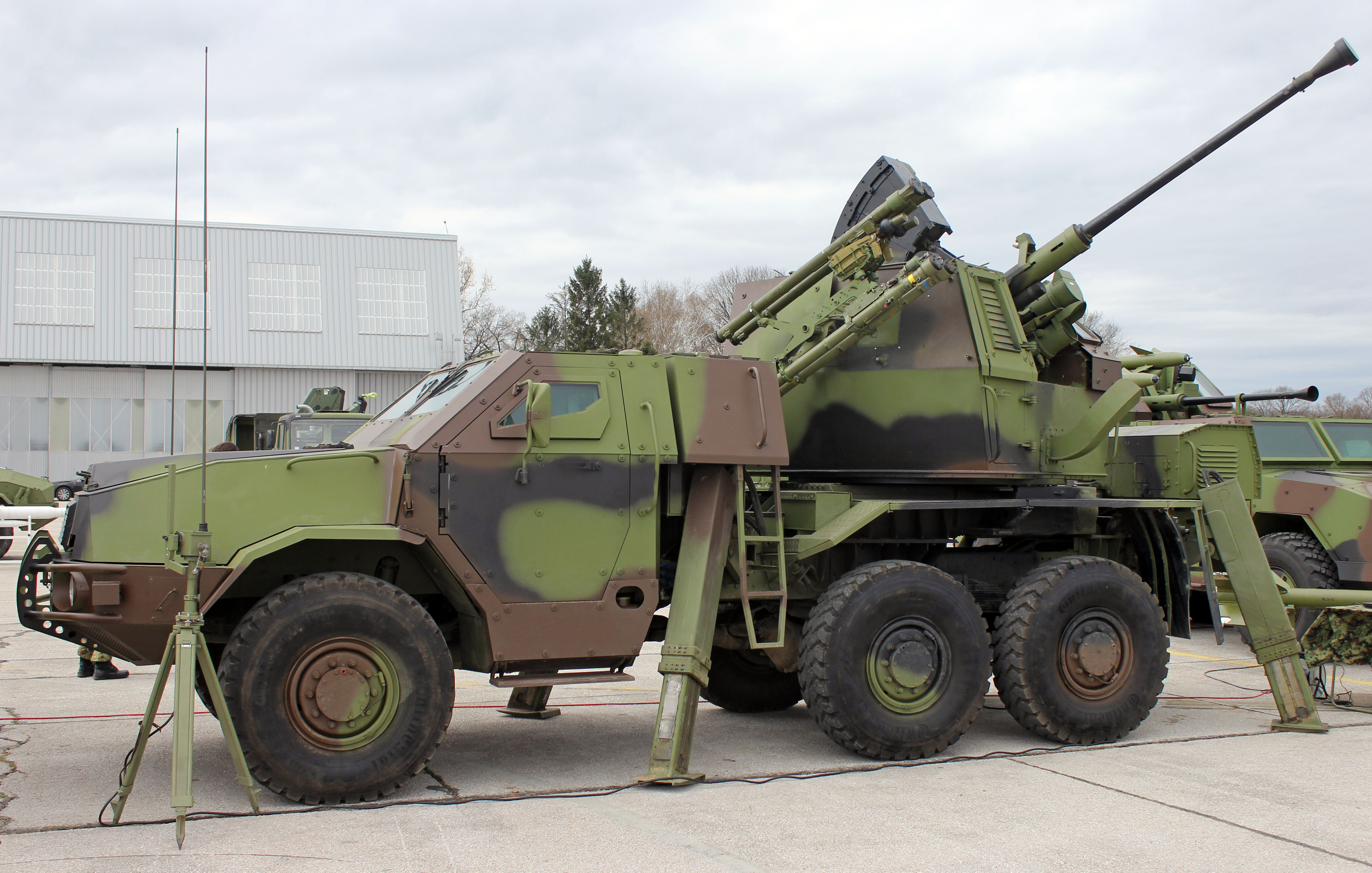
- A PASARS-16 armed with a 40mm gun and 9K38 Igla and 9K32 Strela-2M surface-to-air missiles
- Type: Self-propelled air defense system
- Place of origin: Serbia

Production history
- Designer: Military Technical Institute
- Manufacturer: Zastava TERVO, FAP, PPT Namenska
- No. built: 5 batteries

Specifications
- Mass: 17 tonnes
- Length: 8000 ± 100 mm
- Width: 2500 ± 100 mm
- Height: 3200 ± 100 mm - 3900 ± 100 mm
- Crew: 3
- Rate of fire: 240÷330 rounds/min for gun
- Maximum firing range: 4 kilometres (2.5 mi) (autocannon); 12 kilometres (7.5 mi) (certain surface-to-air missile variants)
- Armor: STANAG 4569 Level I
- Main armament: 40 mm/70-calibre gun and 2–4 missiles
- Secondary armament: Smoke grenades
- Engine: Turbo diesel 280–340 hp
- Suspension: 6×6 off-road wheels
- Operational range: 800 km (500 mi), at a speed of 80 km/h (50 mph)
- Maximum speed: On-road: 100 km/h (62 mph); Macadam country road: 25 km/h (16 mph); Off-road: 15 km/h (9.3 mph).

The PASARS-16 (Serbian: ПАСАРС-16) is a Serbian mobile hybrid short-range surface-to-air missile and anti-aircraft artillery system. Its missions include the protection of infantry, armoured mechanized and artillery units from low flying aircraft, cruise missiles, unmanned aerial vehicles, and other projectiles. Based on the FAP 2026BS/AV six-wheel drive general purpose off-road military chassis, the armoured rotary turret mounted at the rear of the vehicle is armed with a single barrel Bofors 40 mm anti-aircraft gun and one or more surface-to-air missiles, linked to either RPS-42 or modernized M85 Žirafa radars.

The PASARS-16 was designed by the Military Technical Institute. Serial production commenced in 2019, with its armoured turret being constructed by Zastava TERVO, hydraulics and armaments integration being carried out by FAP and PPT Namenska, and final assembly completed by Srboauto.

== Gun ==
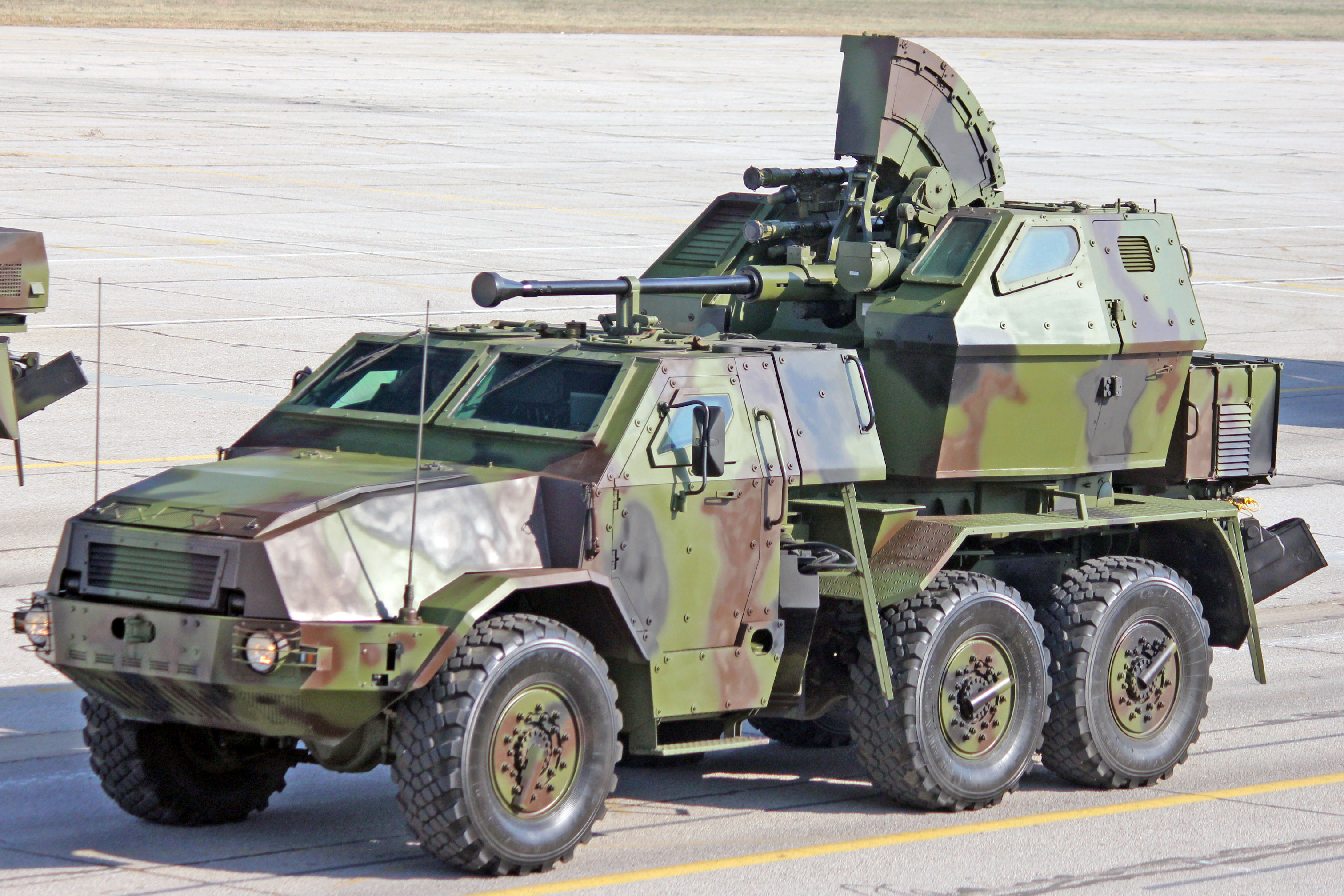
The PASARS-16 armed with a 40mm gun

The PASARS-16's main armament is the Bofors L/70 40 mm anti-aircraft autocannon, which was designed in the 1930s by the Swedish arms manufacturer Bofors and which the Serbian arms manufacturer Zastava Arms acquired a license to produce in the 1970s. The autocannon's ammunition is produced by the Serbian defence manufacturer Sloboda. In 2020, a new programmable airburst ammunition containing 1,100 tungsten pellets was developed. The system has been spotted with a laser rangefinder and a day/night sighting system.

Length	6.3 m (20 ft 8 in)
Barrel length	2.8 m (9 ft 2 in)
Width	2.3 m (7 ft 7 in)
Height	L2.4 m (7 ft 10 in)
Shell	Complete round: 40×365mmR
Standard Shell weight	0.9 kg (2 lb 0 oz)
Caliber	40 mm L/70
Barrels	1
Carriage	about 500 kg
Elevation	−4°/+90°
Rate of fire	240-330 round/min
Muzzle velocity	1,021 metres per second (3,350 ft/s)
Maximum firing range	12,500 m (41,000 ft)

== Missiles ==
=== Mistral ===
French Mistral 3 surface-to-air missiles have been integrated onto the PASARS-16.

=== RLN-1C and RLN-1C/170 ===
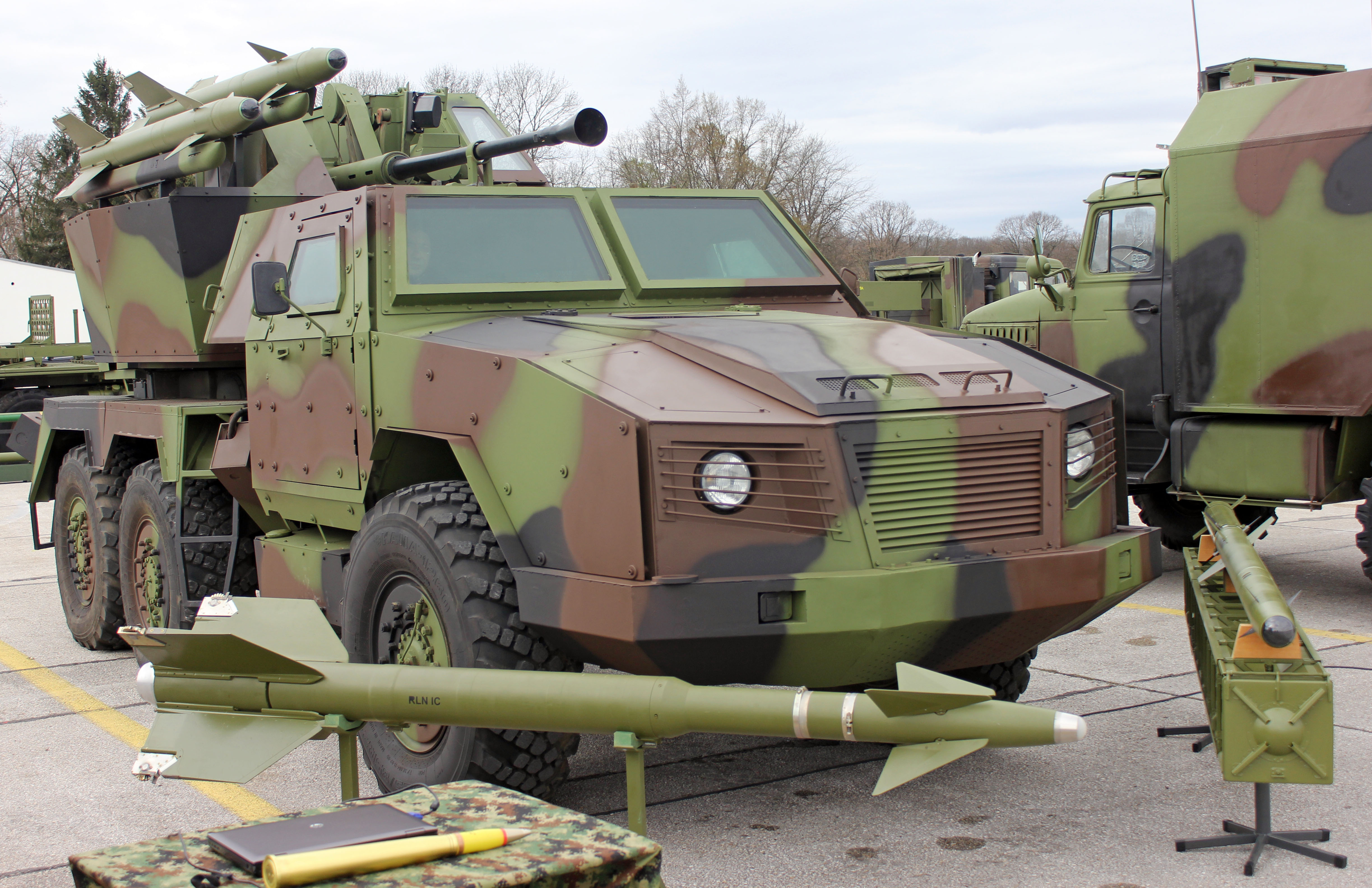
The PASARS-16 armed with a 40mm gun and RLN-1C and 9M37M missiles

The PASARS-16 uses RLN-1C missiles i.e. modified Vympel K-13 (R-13M) short-range, infrared homing air-to-air missile. Modifications by the Military Technical Institute were made to improve the rocket's propulsion block, in order to effectively launch the missile from the ground along with integration of a more powerful warhead with a modern proximity fuse and a modernized infrared homing system that directs the missile to the target.

Length	(R-13M) 2,830 mm (9 ft 3 in)
Wingspan	(R-13M) 530 mm (21 in)
Diameter	(R-13M) 127 mm (5.0 in)
Launch Weight	(R-13M) 75 kg (165 lb)
Speed	(R-13M) Mach 2.5
Range	(RLN-1C) (RLN-1C/170) 12 km max
Guidance	(R-13M, RLN-1C, RLN-1C/170) Infrared homing
Warhead	(R-13M) SB03 11.3 kg (25 lb) blast-fragmentation
Explosive Content	(R-13M) 5.3 kg of TGAF-5 (40% TNT, 40% RDX, 20% Aluminium powder)
Fuze	(R-13M) Type 428 proximity fuze

== Operators ==
- Serbia – 5 batteries in service with the Serbian Army.
