= Iveco Zeta =

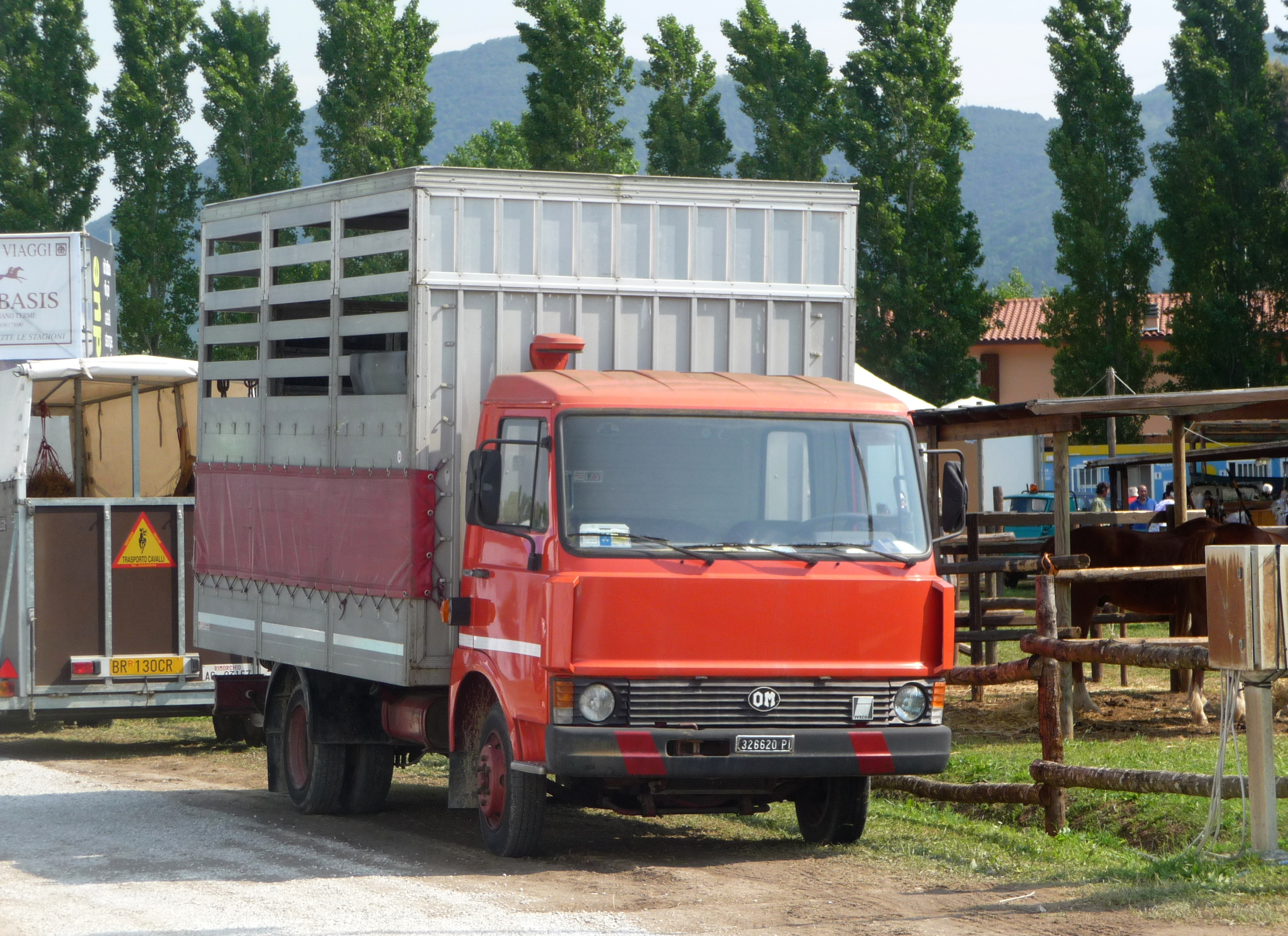
- OM Z-series

Overview
- Manufacturer: Iveco
- Also called: Iveco EuroTurbo; Iveco TurboZeta; Fiat Z-series; Magirus-Deutz 90D/90M; OM Z-series; Saurer-OM Z; Zastava 645/Zeta; Otoyol Zeta
- Production: 1977-1991; 1977-2012 by Zastava
- Assembly: Brescia, Italy (Iveco); Turkey (Otoyol); Kragujevac, Serbia (Zastava)

Body and chassis
- Class: Light to Medium-duty truck

Chronology
- Predecessor: OM X-series
- Successor: Iveco Eurocargo; Iveco Daily (lighter versions); Iveco-Ford Cargo (UK)

The Iveco Zeta is a light to medium-duty truck model produced by the Italian manufacturer Iveco. Appearing in 1976 and entering production in 1977, its cab was developed with the aid of Fiat's wind tunnel in Orbassano. The Zeta series continued the lineage begun with the 1959 introduction of the OM Lupetto. The Lupetto, as well as the Leoncino, the Daino, and the Tigrotto, were all replaced by the OM X-series in 1972, which then formed the basis for the Zeta range. The Zeta itself was replaced by the all-new Iveco Eurocargo in 1991.

== Development ==
It was originally sold with either Fiat or OM badging, with a number indicating the gross tonnage (OM 50-100). The range was thus from 5 to 10 t (11,000 to 22,000 lb). It was essentially just a restyling of the earlier S-series. In France it was marketed by Unic (part of Fiat since 1966 and merged with Iveco in 1975), in Germany as a Magirus-Deutz (with air-cooled Deutz engines), and in Switzerland as a Saurer-OM or Saurer-Fiat, also available with a Saurer engine. The range then gradually began using the unified Iveco name in 1979 (retaining a hyphenated "OM" or "Fiat" during the transition). This process was finished by 1982. After Iveco took over Ford's European truck operations in 1986, the Zeta appeared with combined Ford and Iveco badging in the United Kingdom. Even after the Iveco nameplate gained prominency (center grille), secondary "Fiat" or "Magirus" or other badging still appeared in the bottom left corner of the grille, depending on the market.

The Zeta was issued in a myriad configurations, as it had to replace a variety of existing truck lines from several different producers. Originally, three different engines and four different wheelbases options were offered. Single or double cabins as well as a number of van models with an available raised roof were available. A tilting cab was offered on the 7.9 ton "79" and was standard on heavier models. The range received a light facelift and model shuffle in 1979. Later more engines were added, as well as models which were tailored to suit various local markets. Iveco's naming system during the Zeta's production consisted of two sets of numbers divided by a period: the first digits reflected the gross vehicle weight (GVW) in hundreds of kilograms, while the second set reflected the power in tens of horsepower. Thus, a five-tonner with the 100 PS (75 kW) engine carries 50.10 badging. A tractor unit version of the 50.10 was also available.

=== Magirus-Deutz models ===
Versions with the 4.1 L; 249.3 cu in 87 PS (64 kW) air-cooled Deutz F4L913 engine were called 90D or 90M, with the GVW (in tonnes) following - the range reaching from the 90D5,2 to the 90M7,9. "D" or "M" refers to the cab - in most cases, Ulm-developed designs carried a D while external designs such as the Club of Four carry an M. It is unknown why both letters were used concurrently on the Zeta cab. In 1983, the Deutz-engined models were discontinued.

=== TurboZeta ===
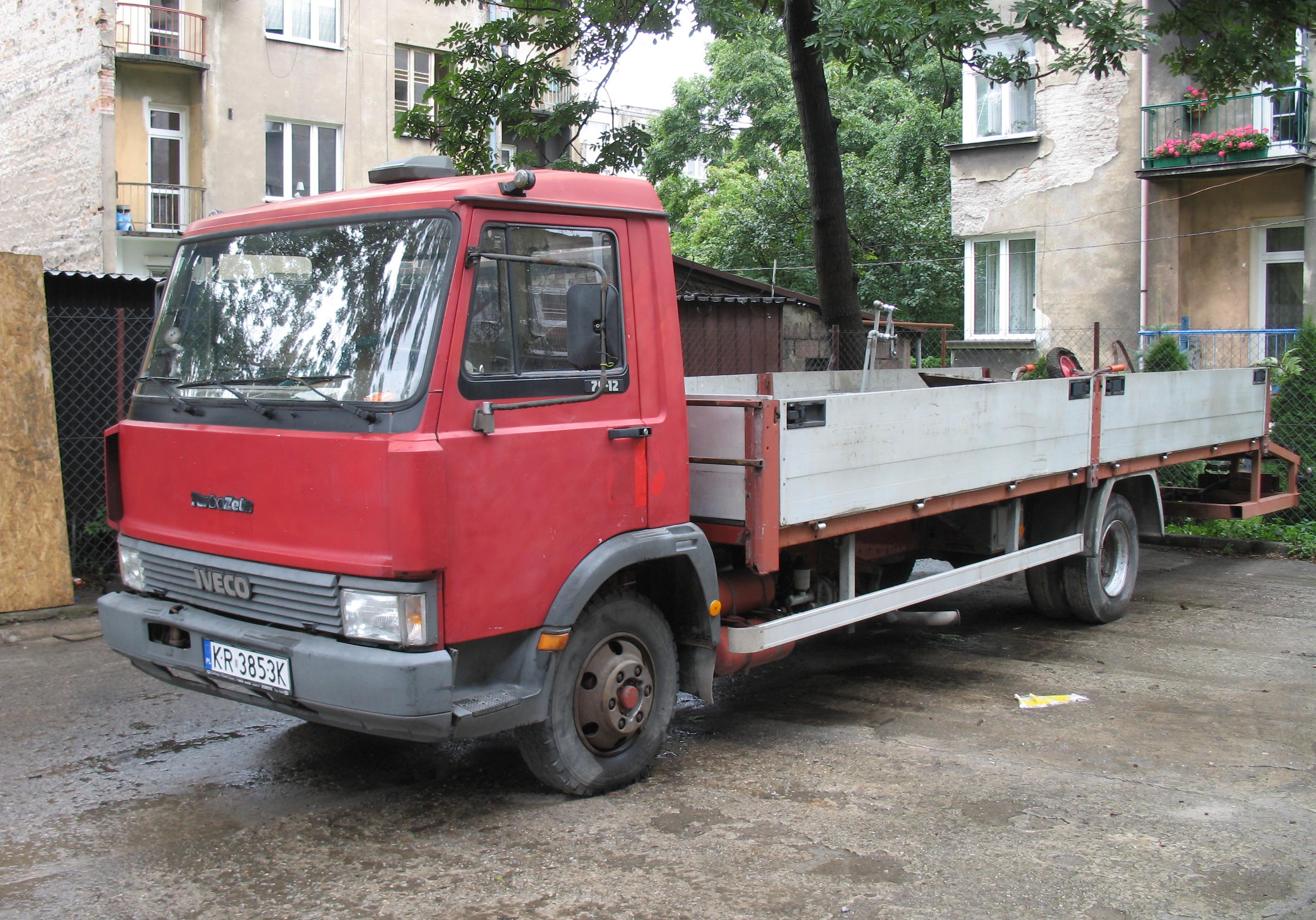
Iveco TurboZeta 79-12

In 1987 the turbocharged Iveco TurboZeta arrived. This had turbocharged versions of the 3.9 litre four-cylinder Iveco 8040 engine with either 74 or 85 kW (101 or 116 PS). The TurboZeta was facelifted somewhat and received more aerodynamic, rectangular headlights. These later found their way into the remainder of the range. The TurboZeta and Zeta were also license built by Zastava Kamioni in Kragujevac, Serbia. Zastava built the truck until at least 2012, and they were exported through Iveco channels to many markets. Since 2004 it has been sold as the EuroZeta, after a facelift and updates to meet the contemporary Euro III emissions standards. More recent versions (85.14) have a 140 PS (103 kW) Cummins diesel engine which meets the Euro IV emissions requirements. The Zeta was also built in Turkey, by Otoyol Sanayi of the Koç Group, from 1990 until 2006. Late, heavier-duty Otoyol Ivecos had their headlight openings blanked and the lamps placed below instead, in the bumper.

In the United States, Iveco Trucks of North America offered the TurboZeta under the EuroTurbo name in the 1980s, until Iveco ended their North American sales in mid-1991. A range of trucks with GVWRs from 10,000 to 22,800 lb (4,540 to 10,300 kg) were available, sold in Classes 3, 4, 5, and 6. The Class 3 EuroTurbo 12-12 had a 105 hp (78 kW) four-cylinder turbodiesel engine while the 10-14, 12-14, 15-14, and 18-14 all have a 135 hp (101 kW) six-cylinder engine. The 23-16 was the only Class 6 model and received a 155 hp (116 kW) inline-six.

The Zeta was gradually replaced from beneath by the heavier versions in the S-series (Daily), and at the top by the lighter duty Ford Cargos (which were sold as Iveco-Fords in some markets, beginning in 1986). In Germany and some other markets, the Iveco-Magirus MK range (Club of Four) also encroached at the top end of the Zeta range. Eventually, in 1991, the all new Eurocargo replaced the remainder of the Zeta range in most Western markets. While large numbers of Zetas were built over a fairly long production life, not many remain in Western Europe. Always built down to a price (and often with indifferent rust protection) they were usually disposed of at the end of their working life. As they look a bit too modern for most classic truck collectors, most remaining European Zetas will likely end up crushed or exported.

== Gallery ==
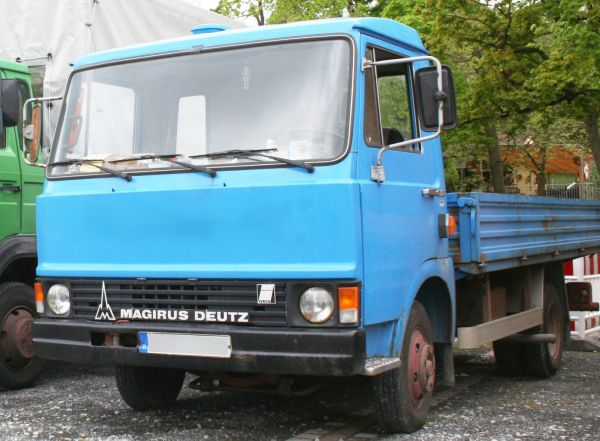
Magirus-Deutz 90M5,3 (Germany)

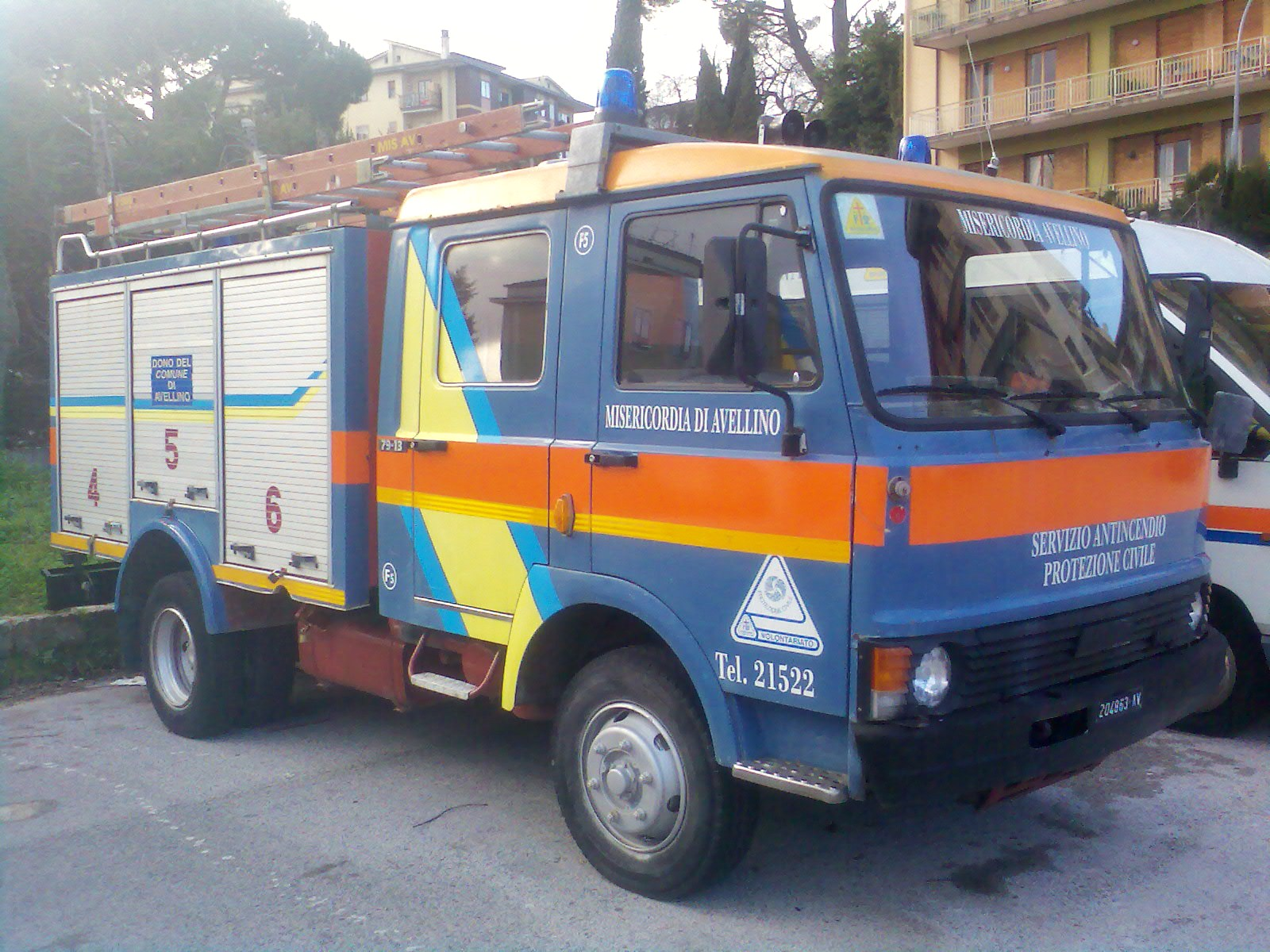
Iveco-Fiat 79.13 double cab as a fire truck (Italy)

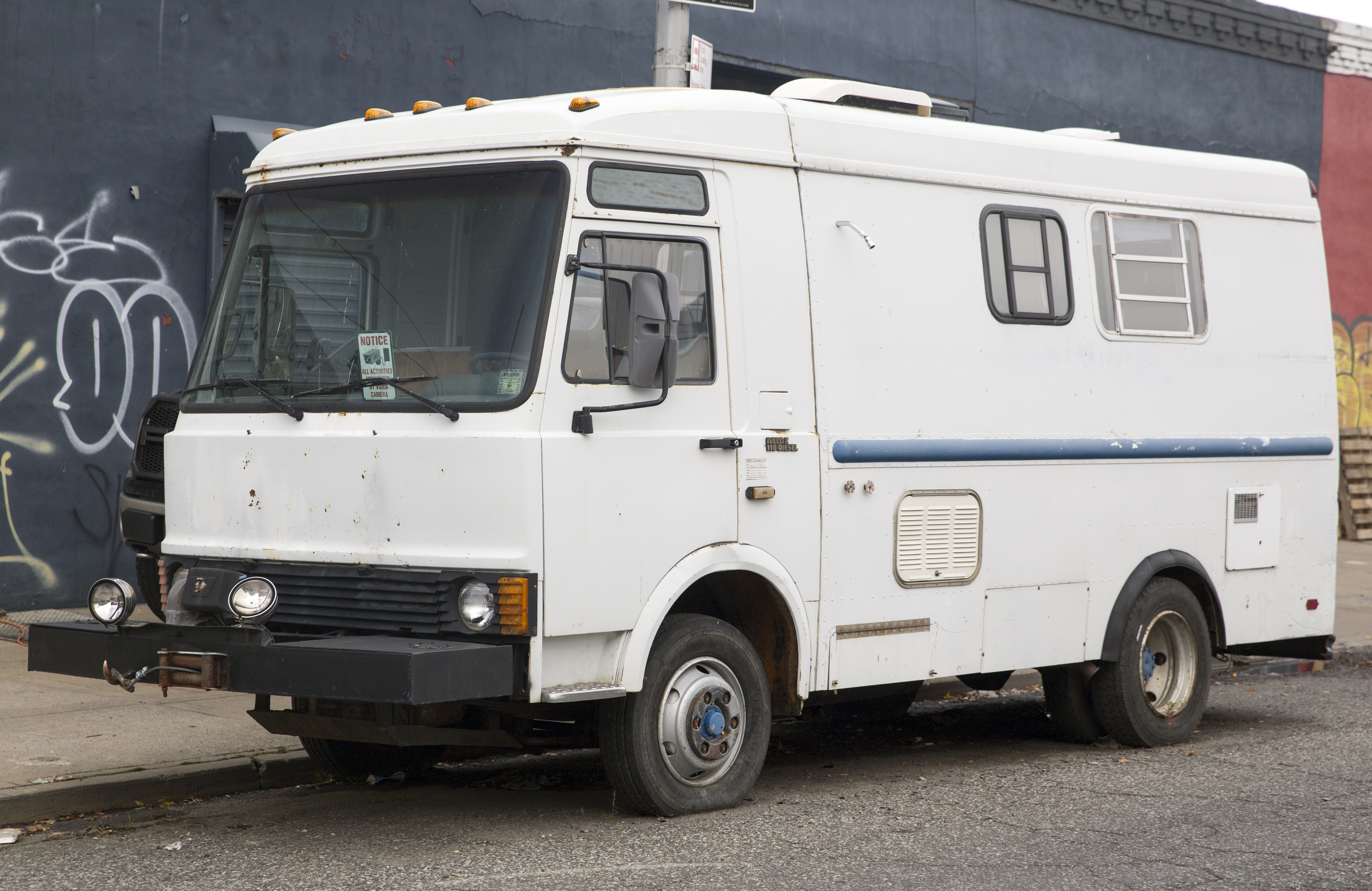
US-market Iveco Z110 (pre-facelift model, sold from 1978 until 1983)

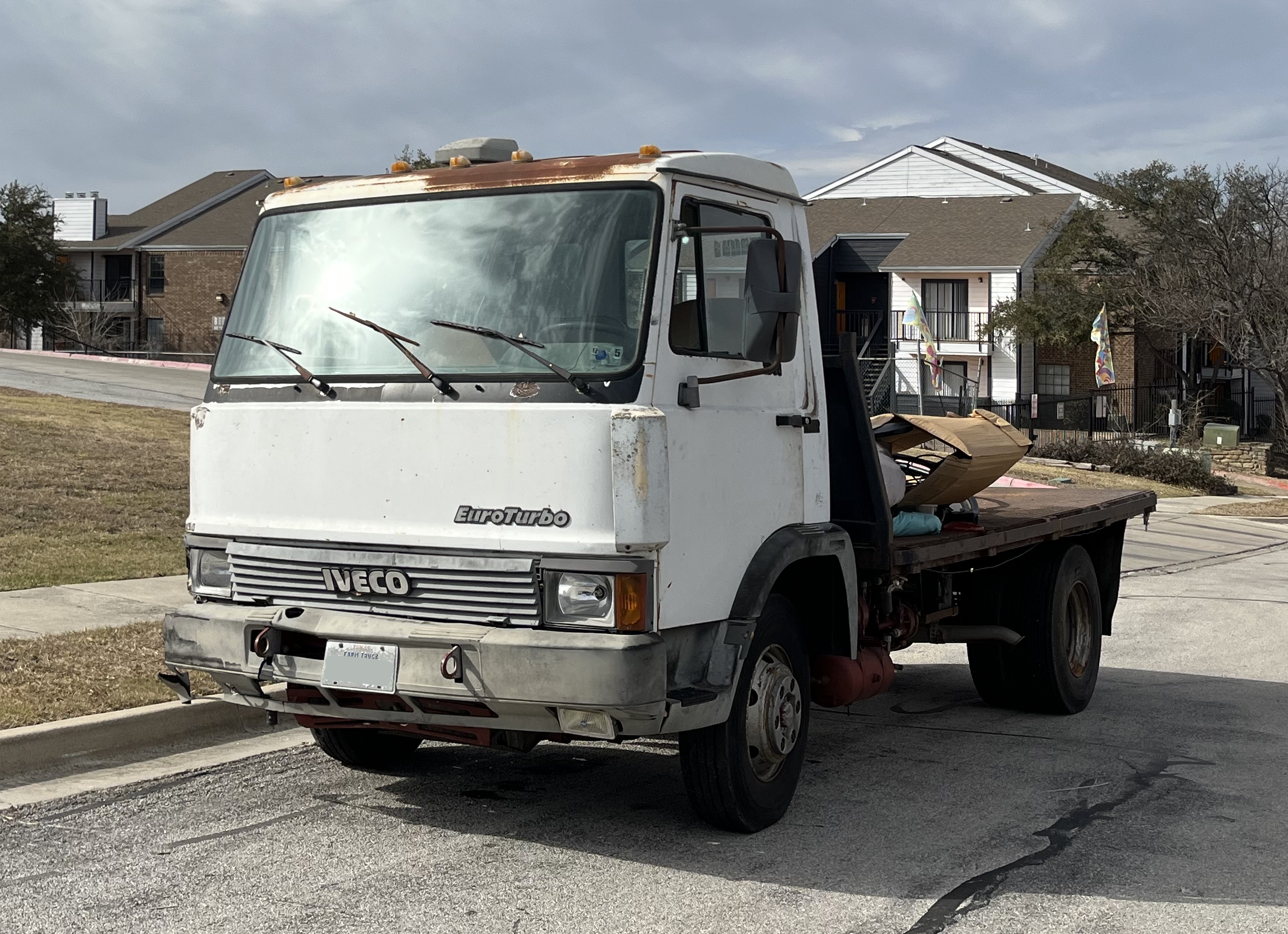
Iveco EuroTurbo 18-14 (United States)

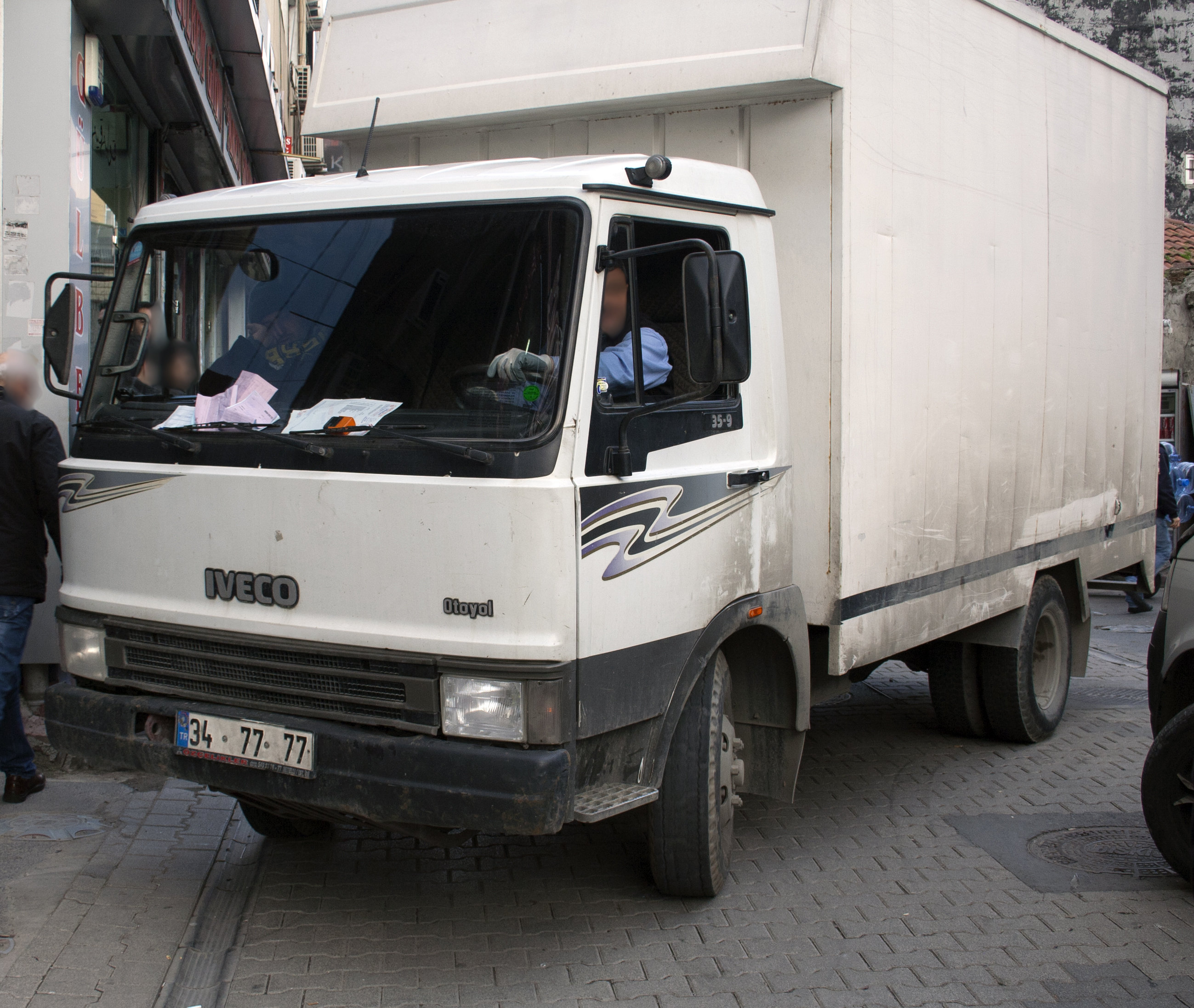
Iveco Otoyol 35.9 (Turkey)

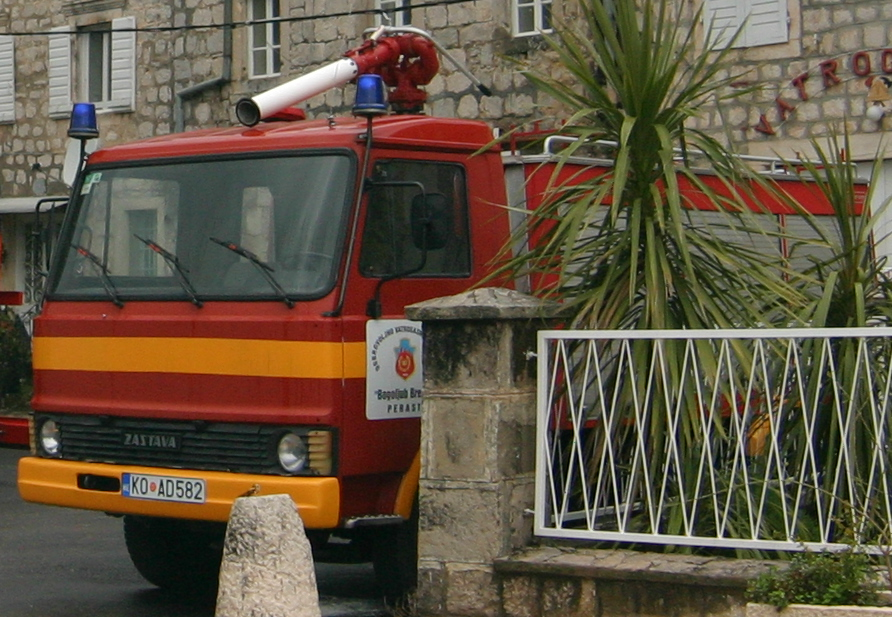
Zastava Zeta (Yugoslavia)

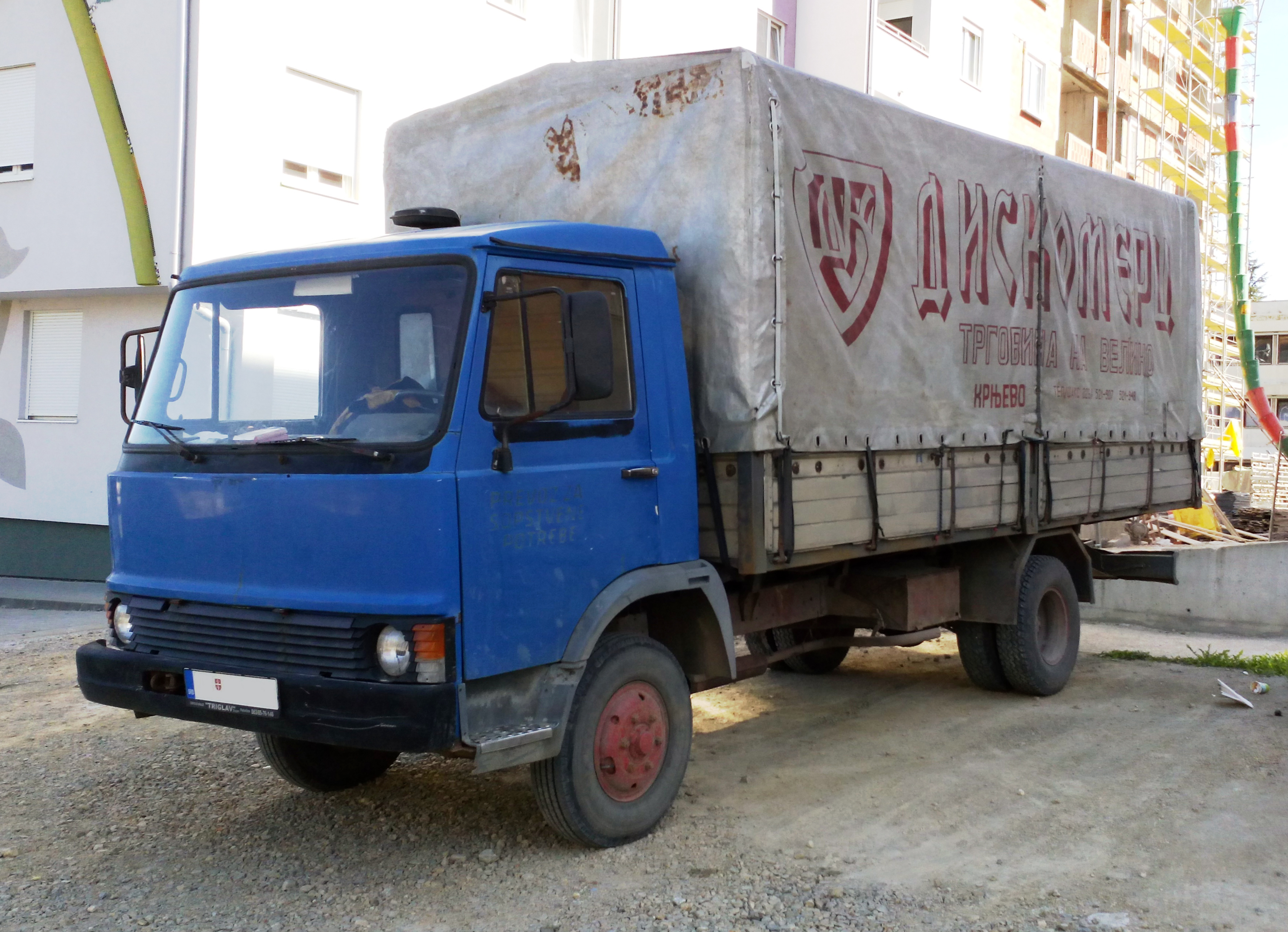
Zastava 645 (Yugoslavia)
