= Iveco EuroCargo =

Medium-duty truck

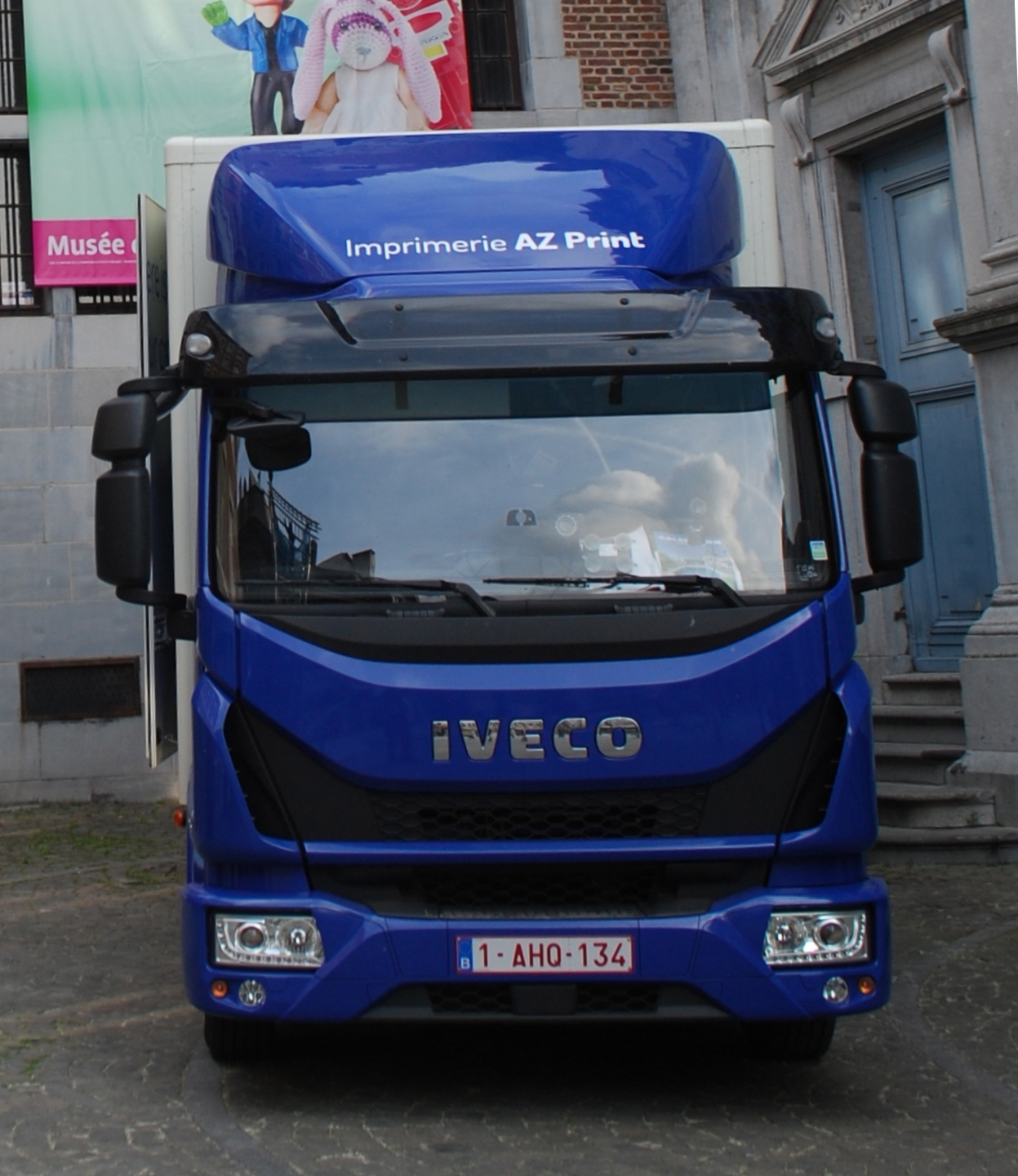

Overview
- Manufacturer: Iveco
- Production: 1991-present
- Assembly: Brescia, Italy; Sumgait, Azerbaijan

Body and chassis
- Class: Truck
- Body style: Low cab forward
- Related: Ford Cargo (shares name but not related)

Powertrain
- Engine: Diesel engine

Chronology
- Predecessor: Iveco Zeta; Iveco Ford Cargo

The Iveco EuroCargo is a range of medium-duty trucks produced by the Italian manufacturer Iveco since 1991. The EuroCargo occupies a place between the light Daily and the heavy Stralis in Iveco's lineup. The EuroCargo replaced the Zeta model produced in the 1970s.

== First generation (1991-2002) ==
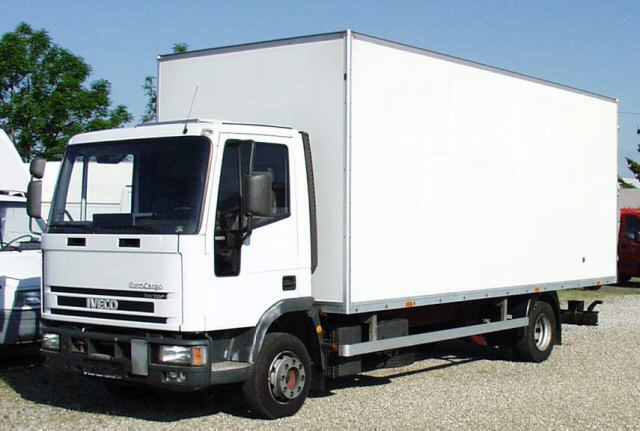
First generation Iveco Eurocargo

The first generation was designed by IVECO Design Centre (Neu Ulm) led by Leonhard Schmude with help from Giorgetto Giugiaro of Italdesign. The maximum gross weight was 6-15 tons, and for models produced in Langley (in Great Britain) up to 17 tons. Both 4x2 and 4x4 (10 and 14 tons) were available.

There were three Iveco engines available, in different power ranges:

- 8040 series, 4 cylinders, bore and stroke 104x115mm, 3908 cc, 116–136 hp (87–101 kW; 118–138 PS)
- 8060 series, 6 cylinders, bore and stroke 104x1x115mm, 5861 cc, 143–177–207–227 hp (107–132–154–169 kW; 145–179–210–230 PS)
- 8360 series, 6 cylinders, bore and stroke 112x130mm, 7685 cc, 239–266 hp (178–198 kW; 242–270 PS)

In addition, 4 types of cabs were available: standard (length 1,535 mm (60.4 in)), extended bed (2,115 mm (83.3 in)), extended bed (1,535 mm (60.4 in)) and double cab. The 6-10 ton versions were equipped with disc brakes on all wheels, hydraulically assisted. The heavier models had rear drum brakes. They used four types of suspension: parabolic leaf springs, semi-elliptical leaf springs, parabolic springs in the front and rear airbags (in the lighter models), air suspension (for urban distribution). In October 1997 there were updates, focusing on the cab and the braking system. At the same time, production in Langley ended, closing the plant. Production was now concentrated in Brescia.

== Second generation (2002-2015) ==
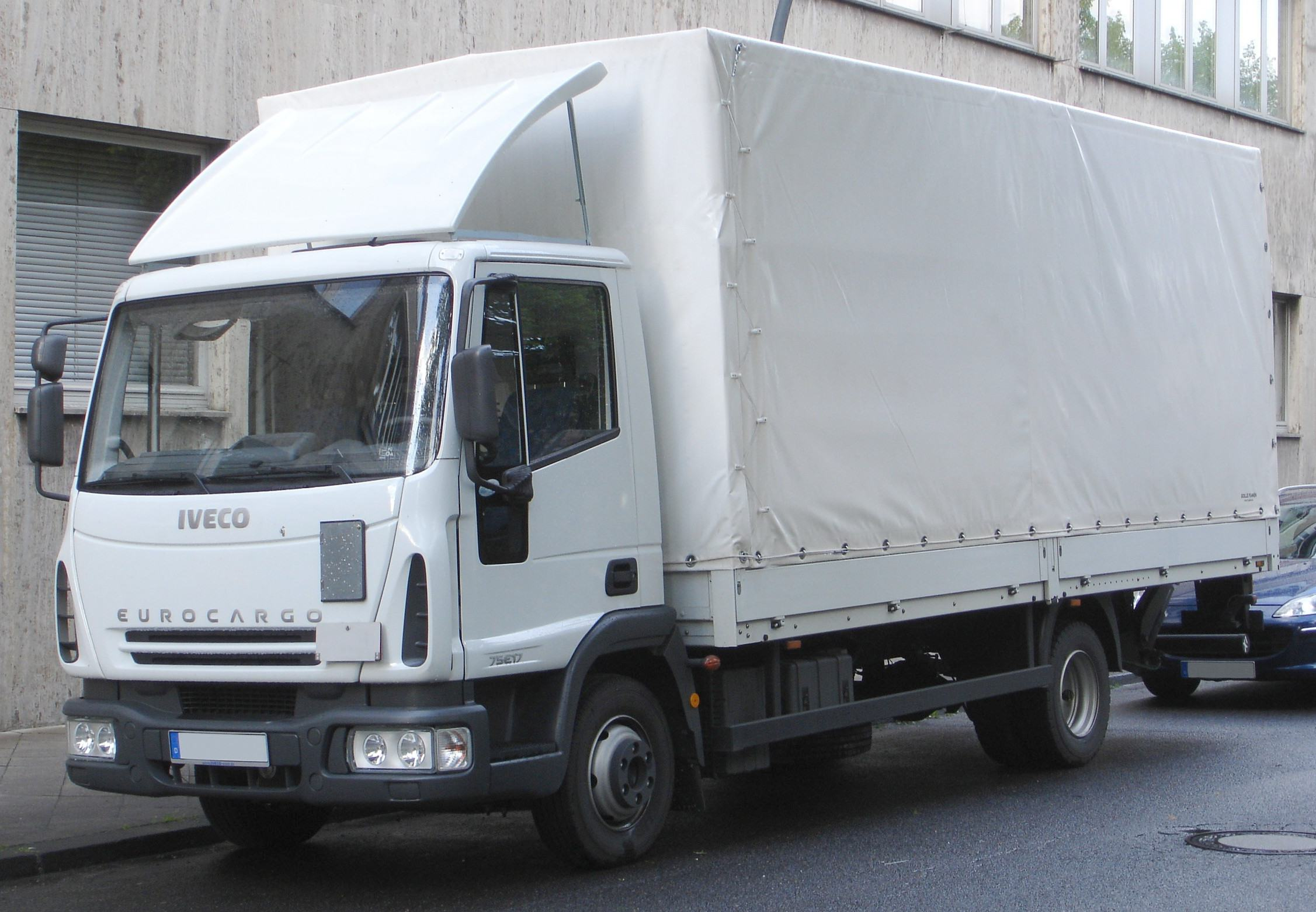
Second generation (2002)

The second generation of the series, introduced in 2002, was designed by Bertone. It was produced in Brescia in Italy, Sete Lagoas in Brazil (from January 2005 onwards) and in a Ferreyra in Argentina, and also assembled in Venezuela.

The maximum gross weight ranged from 6 to 18 tons. Both of 4x2 and 4x4 (GVW 10 and 14 tons) were available. The Iveco Tector engines were used in many variants, including: R4, 3920 cc, 129–170 hp (96–127 kW; 131–172 PS); R6, 5880 cc, 182–275 hp (136–205 kW; 185–279 PS).

There were 4 types of cabs available: Standard Time (MLC), extended bed (MLL, with one or two bunk beds), augmented bed and Extended Crew (MLD, for 7.5t to 15t models) for the driver and six passengers. All 6-10 ton GVW versions are equipped with disc brakes on all wheels, hydraulically assisted. The heavier models have rear drum brakes. The suspensions are the same as those available on the first series. In 2004 and in 2006 there were updates, especially to the Tector 4 and 6 engine range with the adaptation to the requirements of the Euro 4 and Euro 5 emission standards (with SCR). With the update their maximum power was increased by about 10–20 horsepower (7–15 kW; 10–20 PS). Euromidi bus chassis based on the Eurocargo were produced at the Barcelona plant.

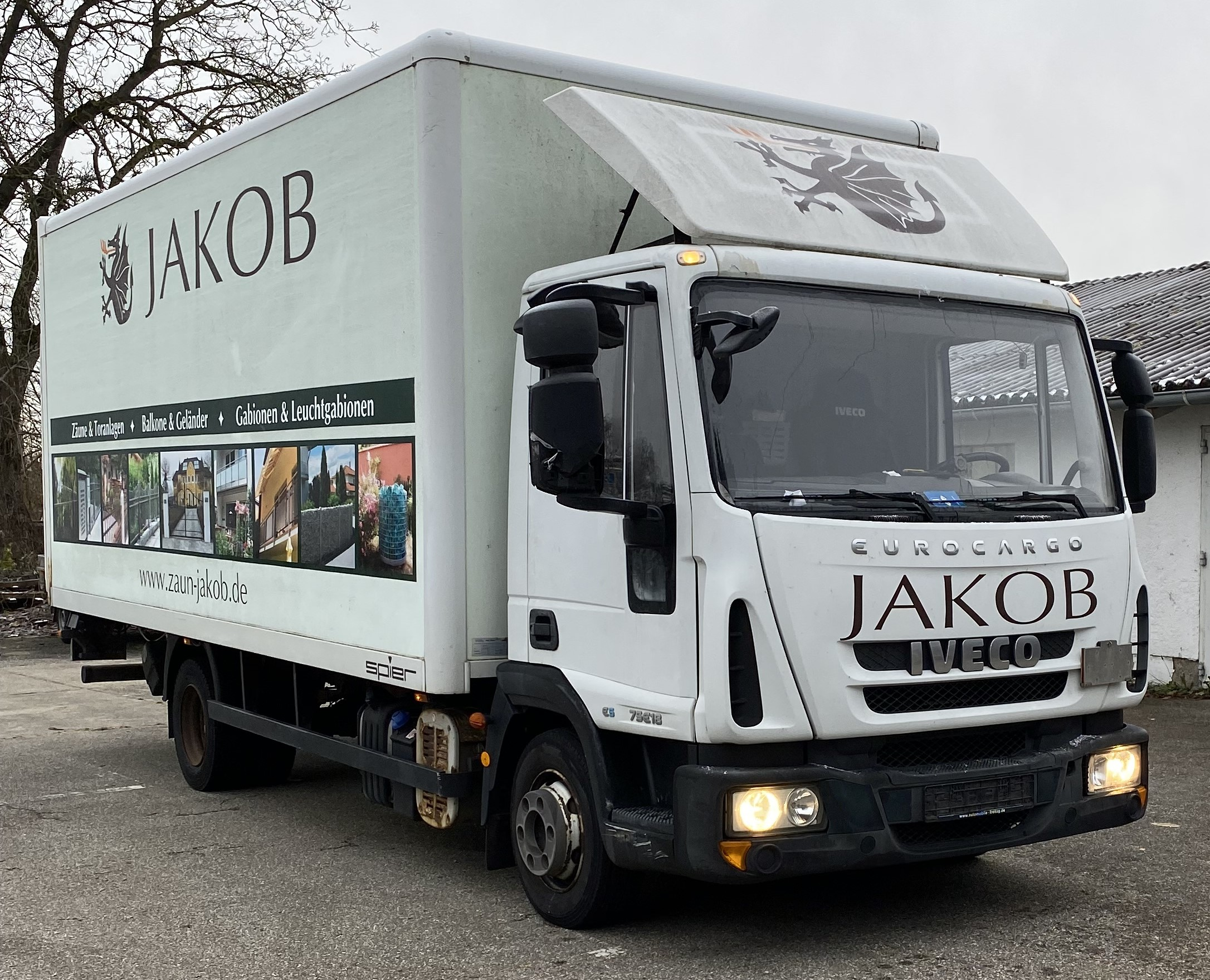
2010 EuroCargo

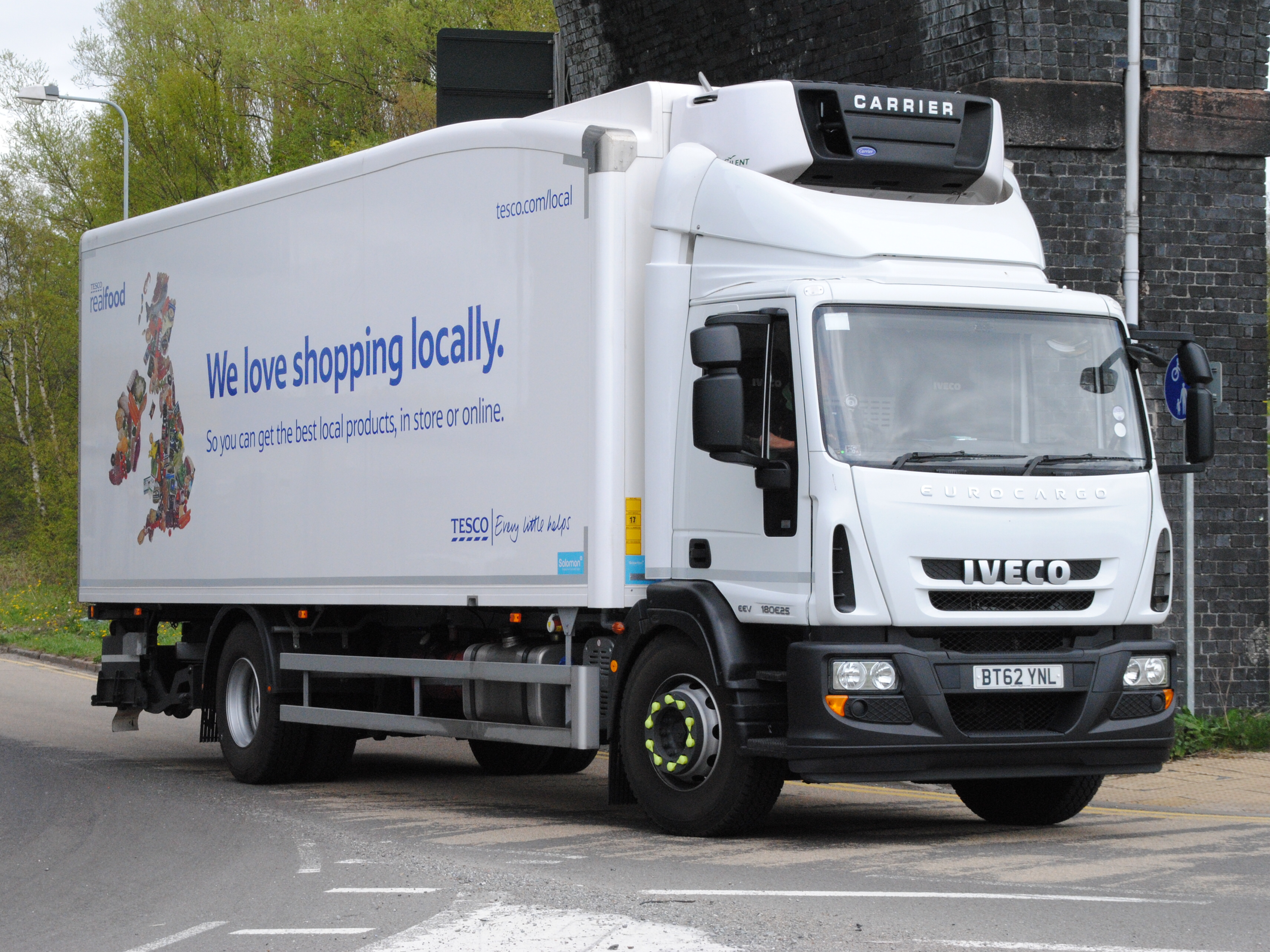
2013 facelifted version

In mid-2008, the Eurocargo was facelifted. The main changes are visible in the design and styling of the cabin. Iveco replaced all its own transmission models with new versions from the German manufacturer ZF with a similar number of ratios (5, 6, 9). The 6-speed versions of the ZF gearbox are also available with Eurotronic automatic or manual (sequential) gearboxes. To advertise the update special All Blacks versions were made. They are characterized by black paint and other details in this color. The engines are part of the Tector family of Fiat Powertrain Technologies. 4-cylinder engines with a displacement of 3900 cc have powers from 140 to 182 hp (104 to 136 kW; 142 to 185 PS). 6-cylinder engines with a displacement of 5900 cc have powers from 217 to 299 hp (162 to 223 kW; 220 to 303 PS). All engines are Euro 5 compliant with SCR. The truck finished second in the competition for the title of International Truck of the Year 2009.

== Third generation (2015-present) ==
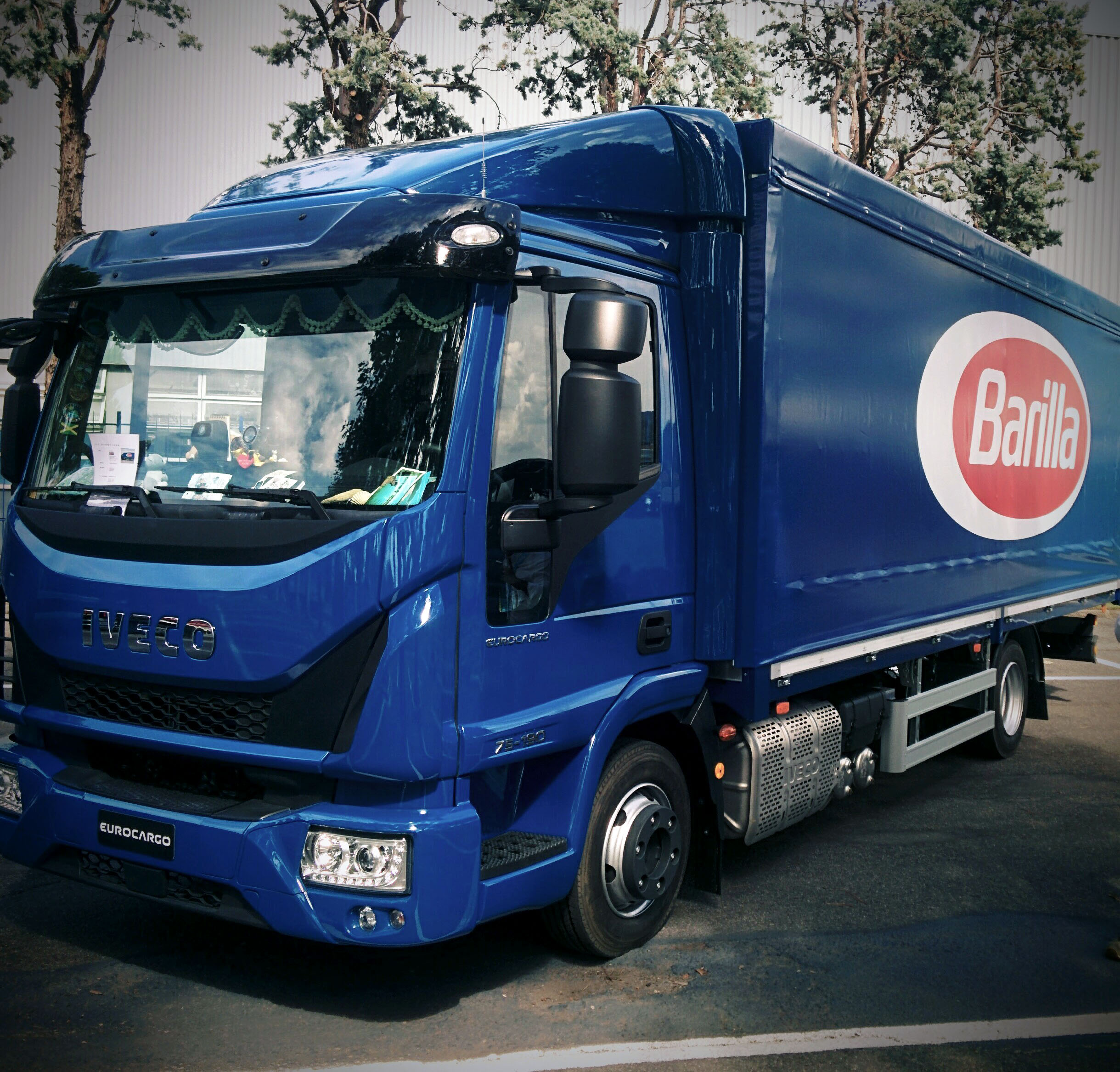
2015 Iveco Eurocargo

A new version of the Eurocargo was presented on 15 September 2015. The vehicle is produced at the Brescia plant. The shape of the new air intakes and the new grille have what has been described as a "smile" shape. The main innovations of this model concern the internal and external design: there is a dashboard equipped with new controls that can be used while driving, an airbag integrated in the steering wheel, standard electronic devices for driving assistance such as LDWS, EVSC, AEBS, ACC, LED Daytime Running Lights (DRL) lights. The 2015 model adopts the HI-SCR system, a "flap" on the exhaust that retains hot gases to quickly bring the system up to temperature, and EcoSwitch and EcoRoll systems.

The vehicle is also available in the Natural Power LNG version. The engines are the 4.5-litre four-cylinder Tector 5 diesel and the 6.7-litre six-cylinder Tector 7 diesel, available in seven power levels from 160 to 320 horsepower (119 to 239 kW; 162 to 324 PS), with maximum torque up to 1,100 N⋅m (811 lb⋅ft; 112 kg⋅m). A CNG engine with 750 N⋅m (553 lb⋅ft; 76 kg⋅m) of torque and 204 horsepower (152 kW; 207 PS) is available.

The engines are combined with manual (6 and 9-speed), semi-automatic (6 and 12-speed) and automatic gearboxes with torque converter. The air suspension is managed by an ECAS system and the braking system is hydropneumatic on the 6-10 t range and fully pneumatic on the 11-19 t range. This generation won the award International Truck of the Year 2016.

=== Safety ===
Euro NCAP test results Iveco EuroCargo 4x2 Rigid (2026)
Test	Score
Overall:	2 /5 stars
Safe driving	58%
Crash avoidance	20%
Post crash	80%

== See also ==
- Kozak (armored personnel carrier)
