= Zastava TERVO =

Serbian defense company

- Native name: Застава ТЕРВО; Zastava TERVO
- Industry: Automotive; Defence
- Founded: 1 September 2017; 8 years ago
- Founder: Government of Serbia
- Headquarters: Kosovska 4, Kragujevac, Serbia
- Key people: Stefan Đurić (Director)
- Products: Trucks, vehicle's armored cabins
- Revenue: ▲€6.66 million (2023)
- Net income: ▼ (€0.35 million) (2023)
- Total assets: ▲€33.24 million (2023)
- Total equity: €0 (2023)
- Owner: Government of Serbia (100%)
- Number of employees: 168 (2023)
- Website: zastavatervo.rs
- Footnotes; Business ID: 21317101; Tax ID: 110210050

Zastava TERVO (Serbian: Застава ТЕРВО, romanized: Zastava TERVO), short for "Zastava Terenska Vozila" (Serbian: Застава Теренска Возила, romanized: Zastava Terenska Vozila; English: "Zastava Terrain Vehicles"), is a Serbian automotive and defense company, specialized in the manufacturing of light armored vehicles.

== History ==
Company was formed in 2017 with all assets of Zastava Trucks including most of its employees.

== Products ==
The company manufactures all terrain vehicles for military and civilian use and armoured cabins and parts for military vehicles.

=== Vehicles ===
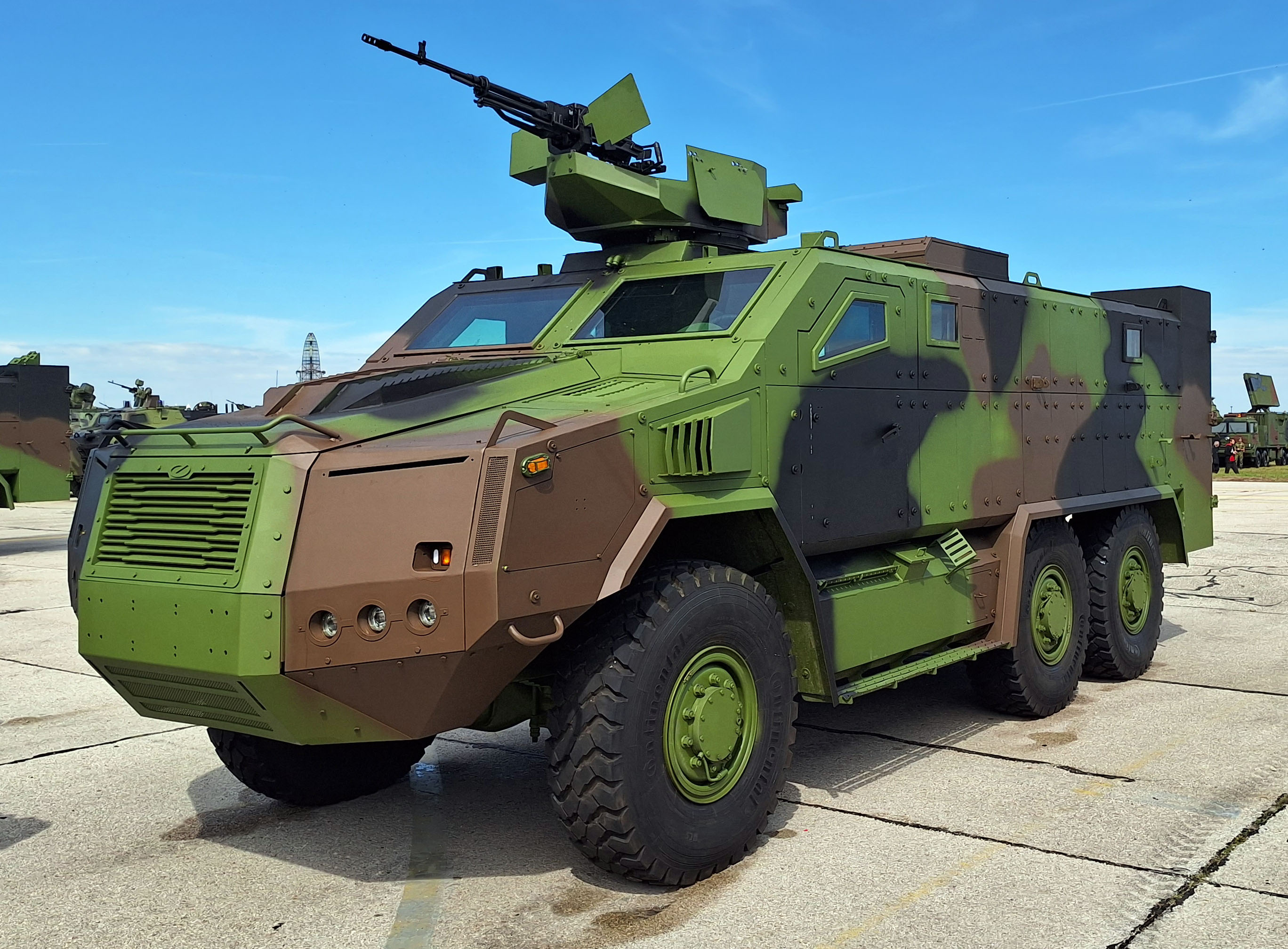
Zastava M20 MRAP

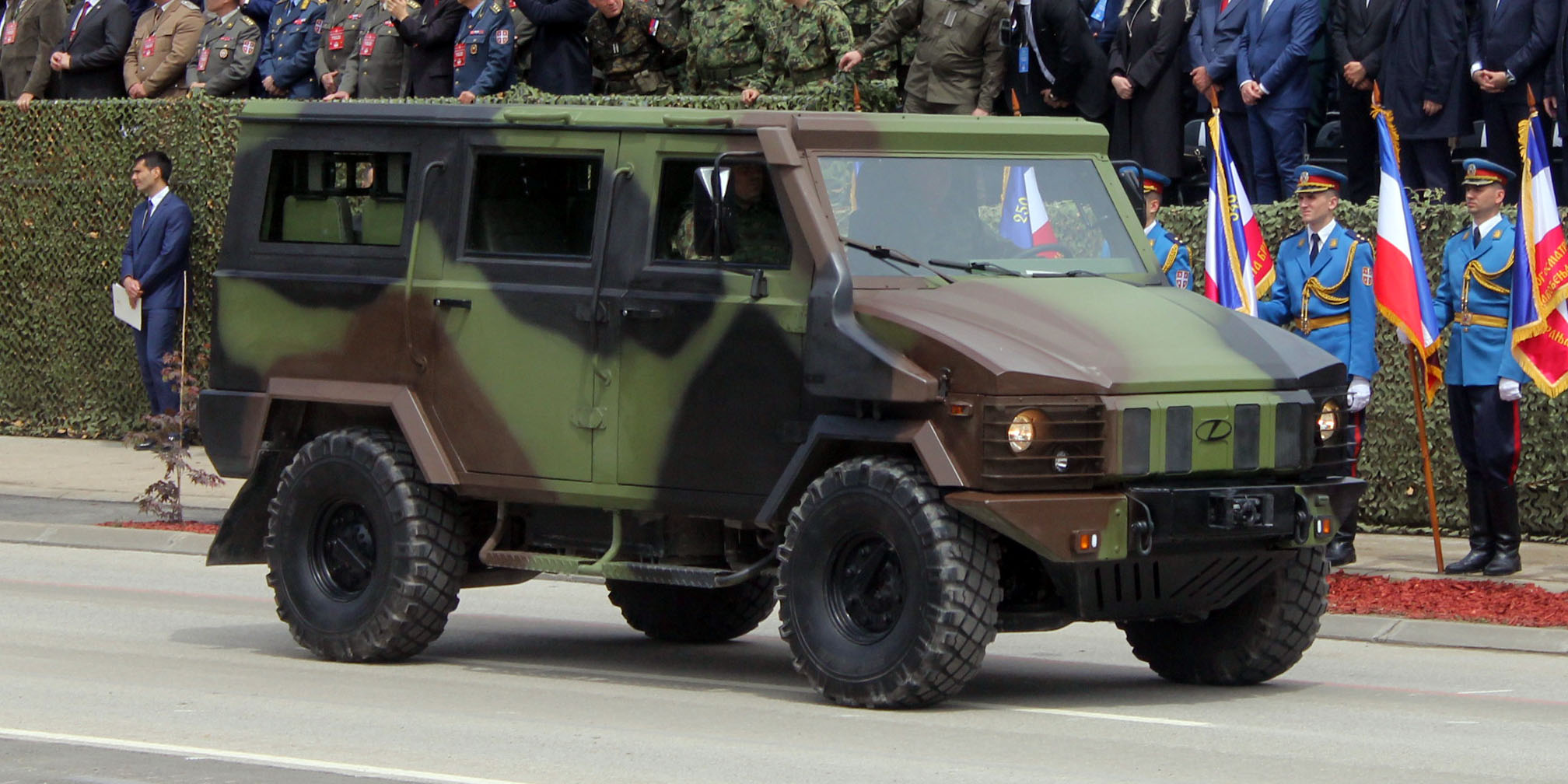
Zastava NTV

The main products include Zastava M20 MRAP and the Zastava NTV.

In 2021, Yugoimport SDPR and FAP commenced production of BOV M16 Miloš in cooperation with Zastava Tervo.

=== Armoured cabins ===
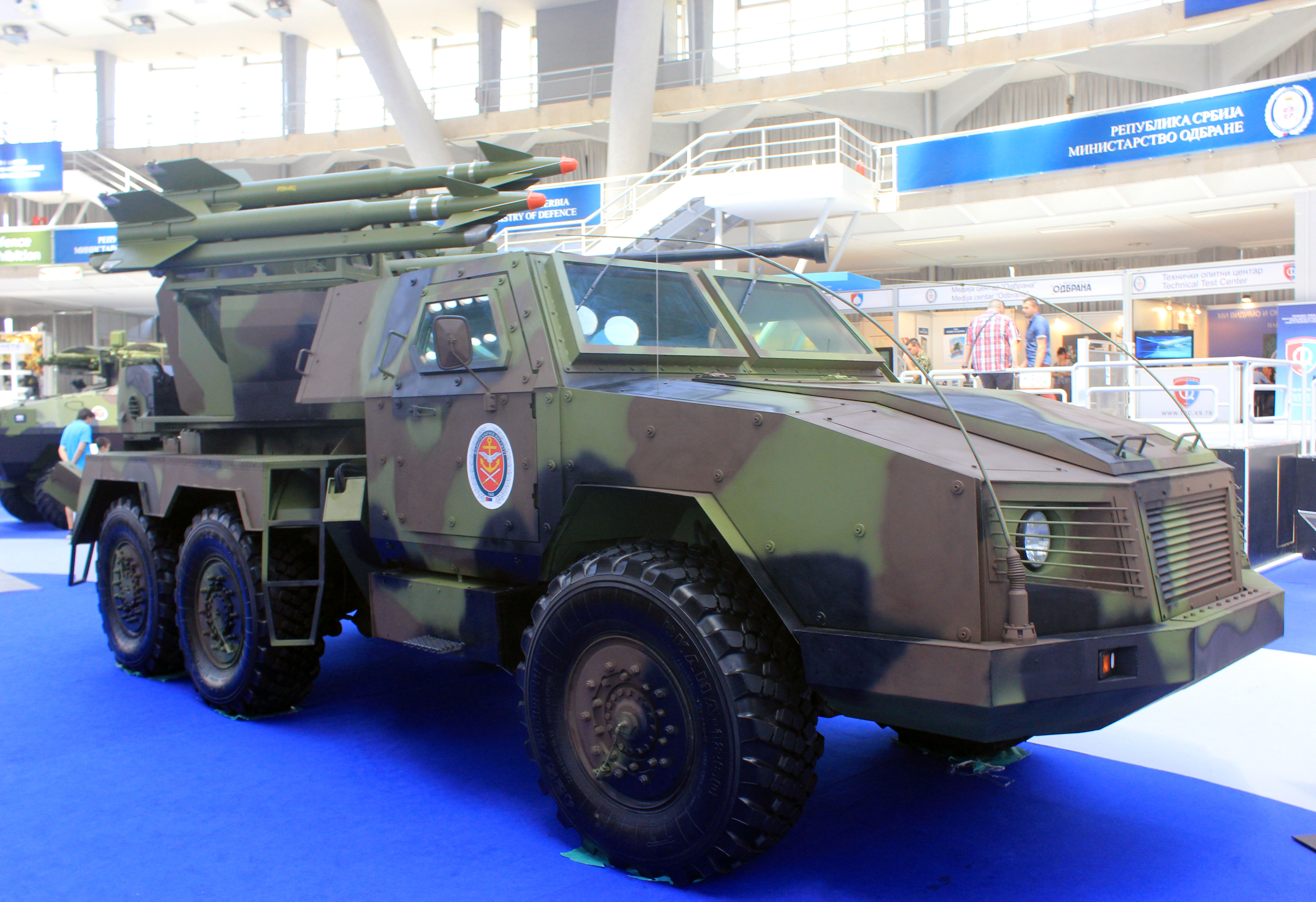
PASARS-16

In cooperation with FAP, the company manufactures armoured cabins for military vehicles such as cabins for PASARS-16, modernized and modular M-77 Oganj and armoured launcher for ALAS missile.

== See also ==
- Defense industry of Serbia
