= OM X-series =

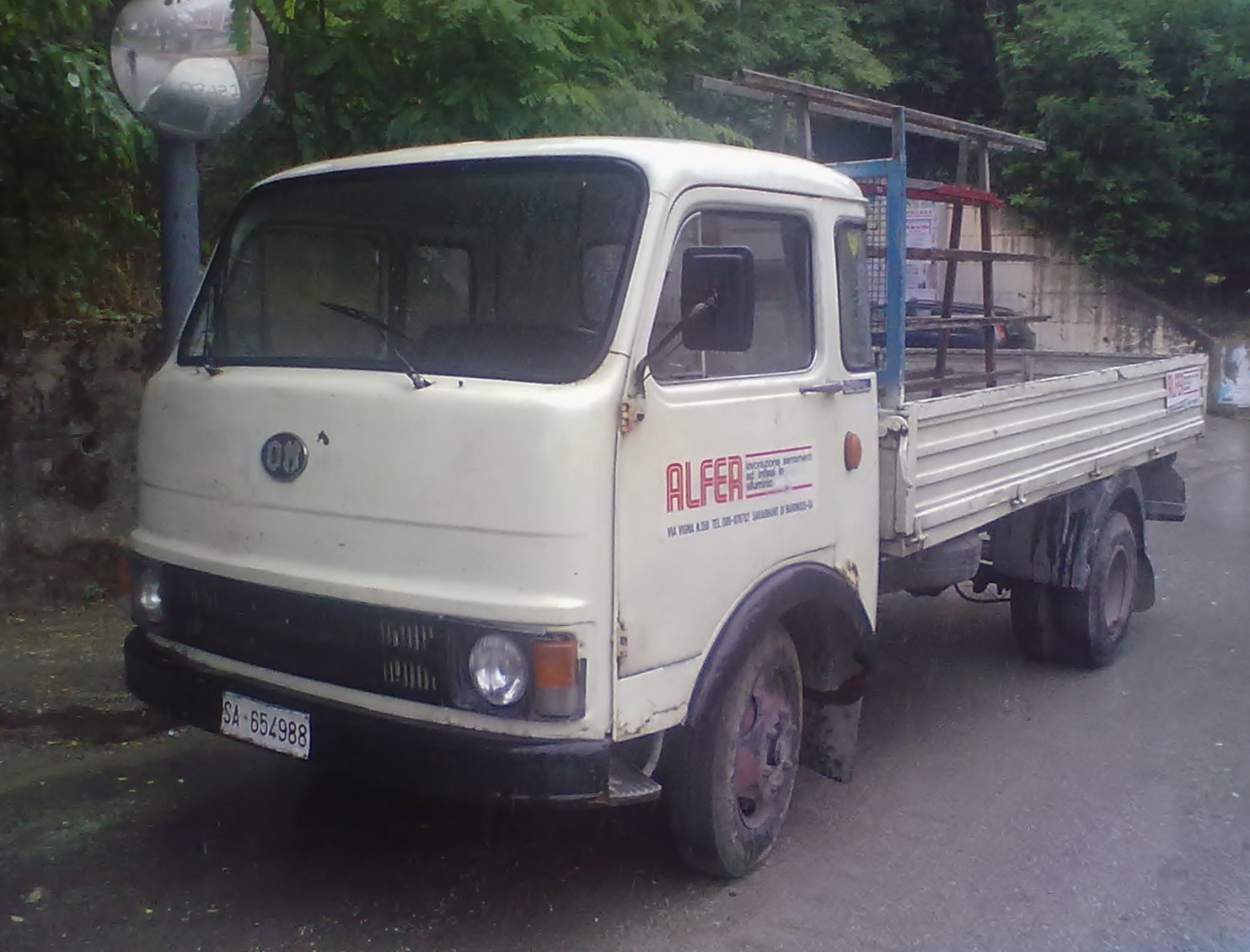

Overview
- Manufacturer: Iveco
- Also called: Fiat NC; Magirus-Deutz X-series; Unic-OM X-series; Saurer-OM X; Zastava 635/640; Steyr-OM
- Production: 1972-1977; 1972-1987 (Fiat 35/40 NC)
- Assembly: Brescia, Italy (OM/Iveco); Kragujevac, Yugoslavia (Zastava)

Body and chassis
- Class: Light to Medium-duty truck

Powertrain
- Engine: 3455 cc Fiat 8040.02 diesel I4; 4086 cc Deutz F4L 913 air-cooled diesel I4; 4561 cc OM CO3/41 diesel I4; 4949 cc OM CO3/7 diesel I4; 5184 cc Fiat 8060.04 diesel I6

Chronology
- Predecessor: Fiat 645, 650; OM Lupetto/Leoncino/Daino/Tigretto; Magirus-Deutz Eicher series
- Successor: Iveco Zeta; Iveco Daily (Fiat 35/40 NC)

The OM X-series is a light to medium-duty truck model produced by the Italian manufacturer OM in 1972. While being superficially similar to the OM Lupetto, Leoncino, Daino, and Tigrotto, it was an all-new design - except for using the same doors as the earlier "zoological" series (thus called as they were all named after animals). The X-series was sold under a variety of other names as well, depending on the market. All but the two lightest models were replaced by the new Z-series in 1976, a design which briefly used OM badging but ended up being marketed exclusively as an Iveco.

== Development ==
Developed by OM, it was offered with a variety of different engines and with many different badges. The smallest versions used Fiat's 8040 four-cylinder diesel engine, and were marketed as Fiats, OMs or Unics in France. Mid-range versions (sold as OM or OM-Saurer) used the larger OM CO3 four-cylinder, developed together with Saurer of Switzerland. The heaviest models received Fiat's six-cylinder 8060 engine and were sold as Fiats or Unics, and also as the OM N100.

OM's versions were named with a two-digit code indicating gross tonnage ranging from the OM 35 to the 100, a system also used by Saurer on the versions they sold. The range was thus from 3.5 to 10 t (7,700 to 22,000 lb). Fiat and Unic used the same numerical system followed by NC (for Nafta Cabinato, "diesel cab-over"). Magirus-Deutz sold this range under their brand after 1975 and used their own air-cooled engines for some models (55, 60, 75). In Austria, this truck was marketed as a Steyr-OM. The X-series was also built by Zastava, beginning in 1978. Kits for the 35-40 were also sent from Zastava's plant by Iveco for CKD-assembly in Kano, Nigeria, by a company called NTM. These trucks received Fiat badging, as this brand was considered strongest in Nigeria.

The X-series cab was lightly facelifted a few years after its introduction, when the early metal grille was replaced by a black plastic unit with horizontal bars. The interior remained unchanged. "Iveco" badging also became more prominent after that company was founded on 1 January 1975. A more thorough redesign, with a new, more square cab, appeared in late 1976 and was called the OM Z-series. This replaced the earlier X lineup by 1977, although the Fiat 35/40 NC remained on sale until 1987 with the earlier cabin and it continued to be built by Zastava in Yugoslavia into the early eighties.

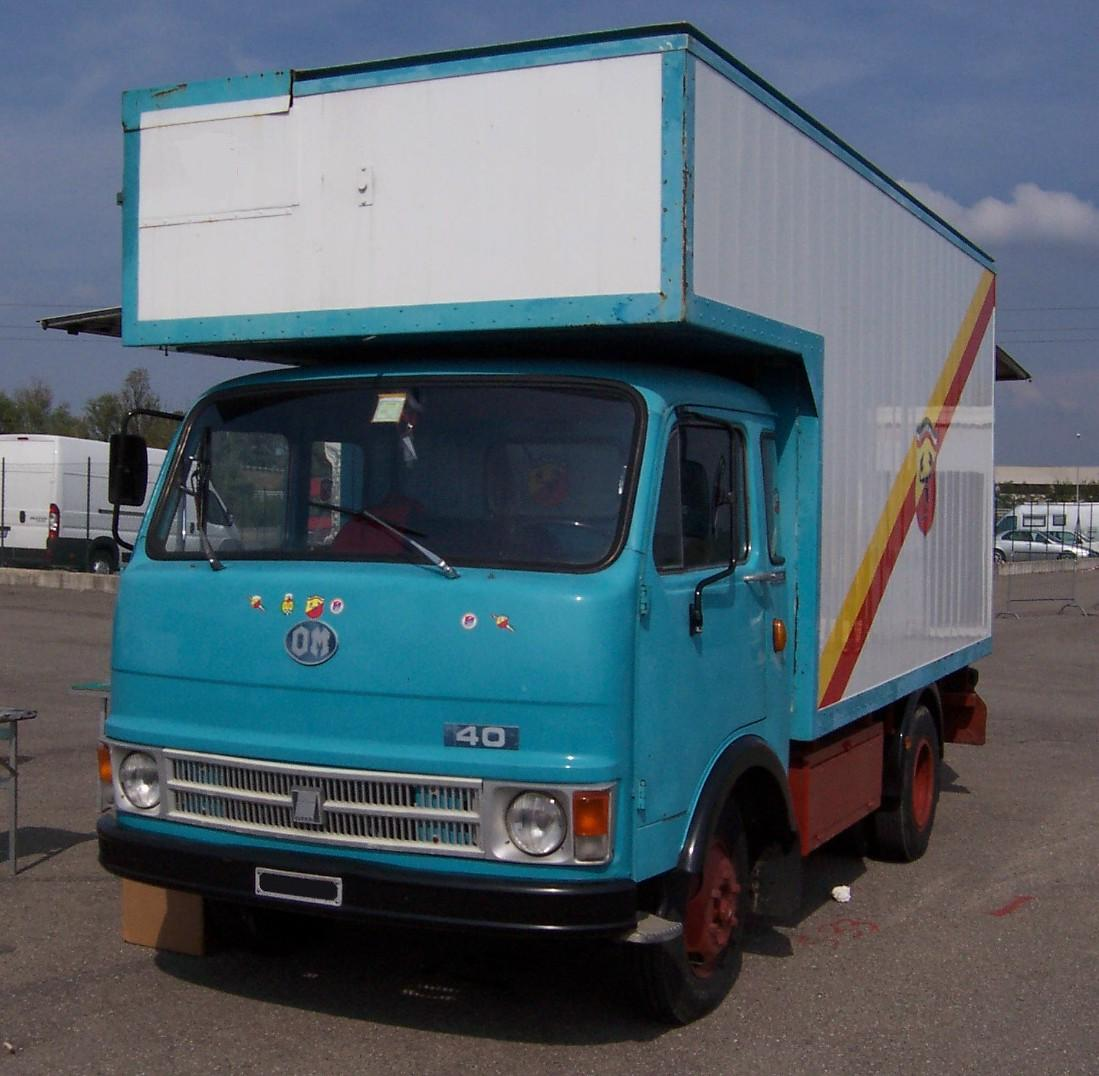
OM 40 moving truck

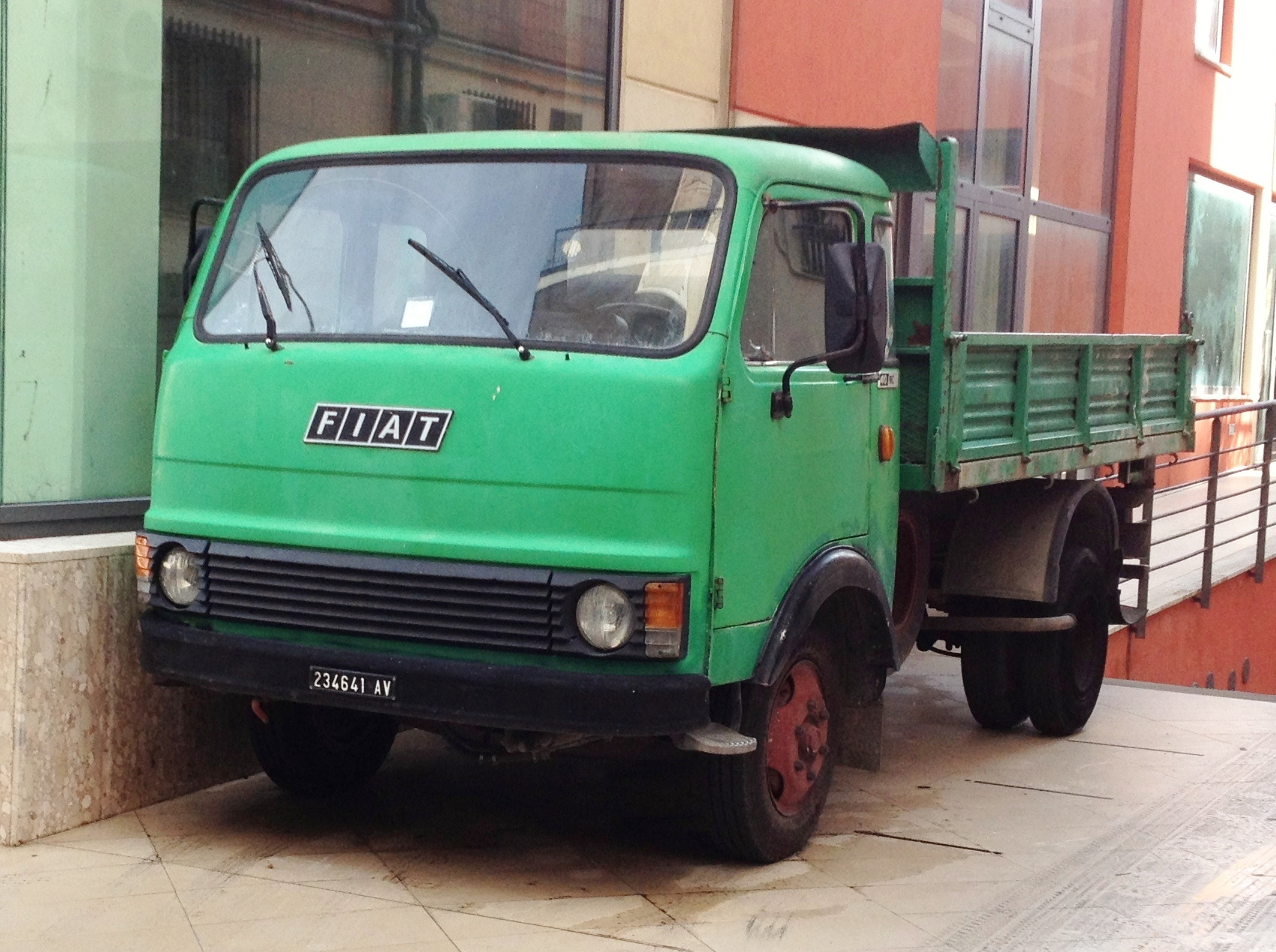
Fiat 40 NC, facelift model with plastic grille

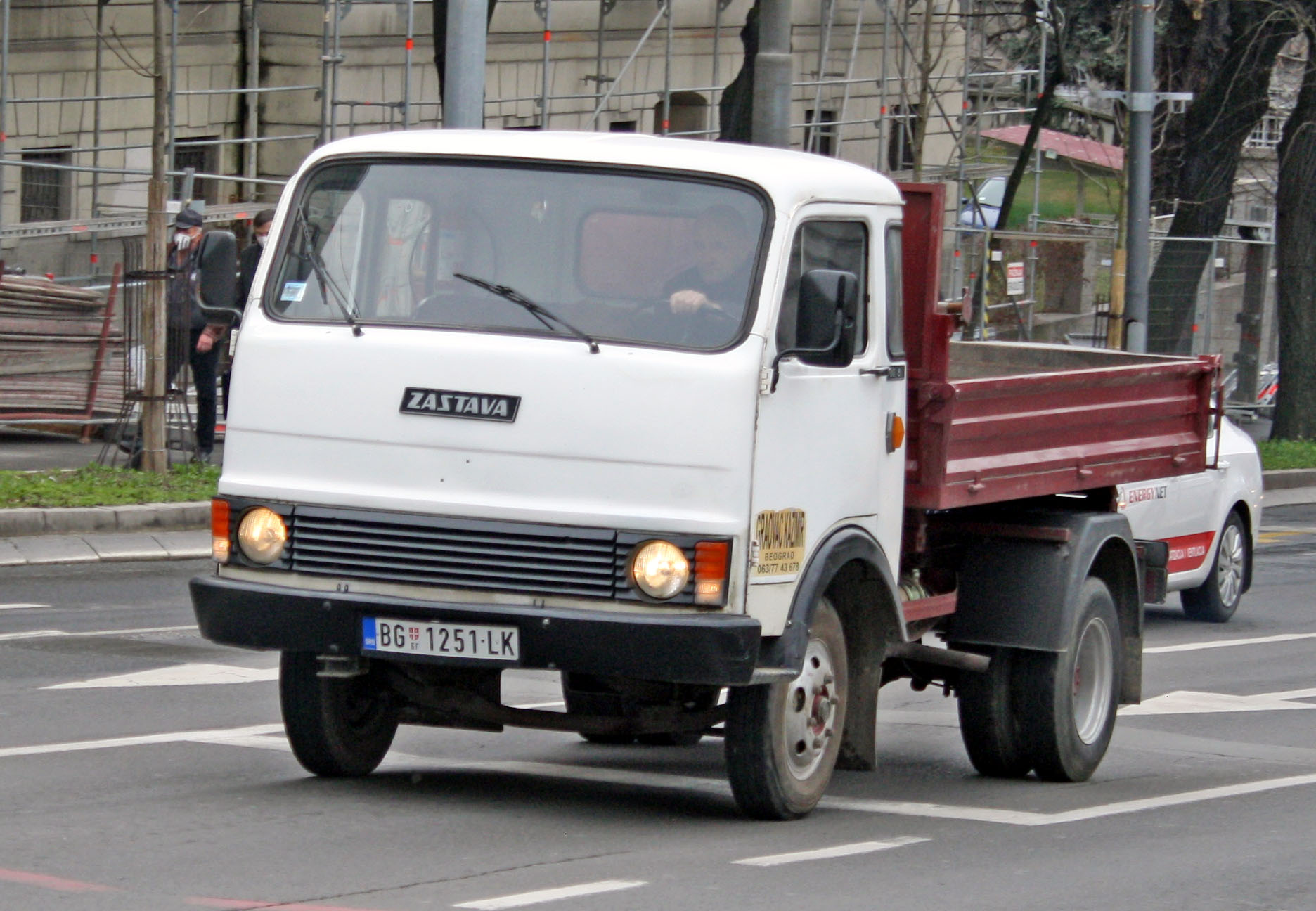
Zastava 635AN
