= Zastava M02 Coyote =

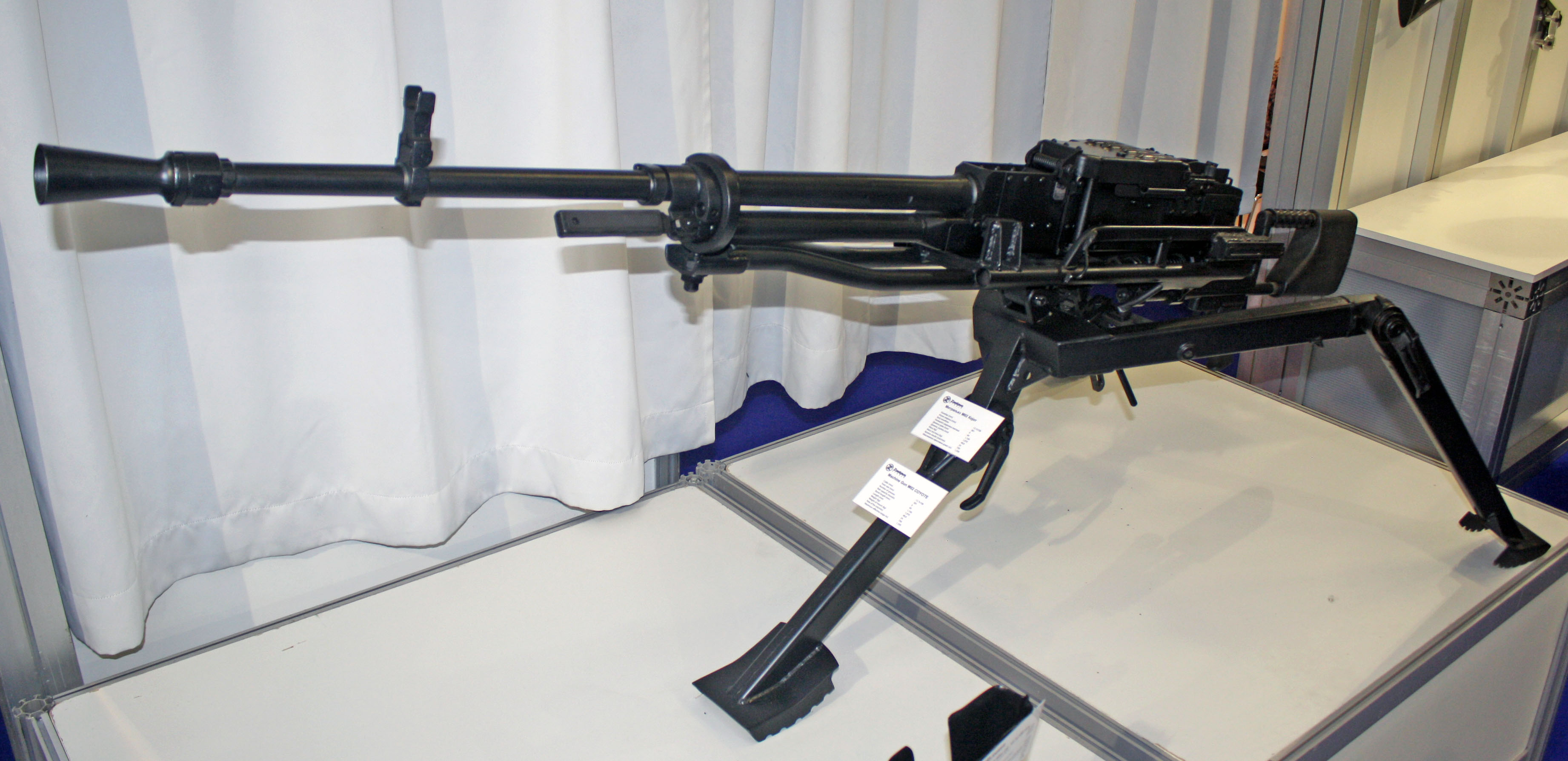
- Type: Heavy machine gun
- Place of origin: Serbia

Service history
- In service: 2002–present
- Used by: Serbia
- Wars: Boko Haram insurgency Syrian Civil War; Yemeni Civil War (2014–present); Saudi Arabian-led intervention in Yemen; 2020 Nagorno-Karabakh conflict

Production history
- Designer: Zastava Arms

Specifications
- Mass: 48.8 kg
- Length: 1970 mm
- Barrel length: 1100 mm
- Cartridge: 12.7×108mm
- Caliber: 12.7mm
- Barrels: 1
- Action: Gas-operated
- Rate of fire: minimum 700 round/min
- Muzzle velocity: 820-860 m/s
- Effective firing range: 2000 m against ground targets, 1500m against air targets<
- Feed system: Belts in 60 round boxes

The Zastava M02 Coyote is a 12.7mm heavy machine gun produced by Zastava Arms. The M02 is very similar to the NSV machine gun and Kord machine gun in appearance and capability. The M02 can fire over 700 rounds per minute and has a maximum effective range of 2,000 m against ground targets and 1,500 m against airborne targets.

== Description ==
The primary purpose of the Coyote is neutralization or destruction of living force or light-armoured vehicles on the ground, on water, at distances up to 2,000 metres (6,600 ft). It can be used for action at air targets. The Coyote has a cradle that is set to a stable tripod. The tripod enables adaptation to various terrains. The machine gun has a pistol trigger mechanism and handgrip and also springs in the stock. These primary assemblies enable accurate fire. Aiming is done with optical sight or with front and rear iron sights. The M02 functions without stoppages in all environments.

The barrel is made by cold forging, which guarantees its durability and permanence. The interior of the barrel is chrome plated, which provides unaltered ballistic characteristics for several thousands of fired rounds. The barrel is quickly and easily stripped from the machine gun, so when the gun is heavily used it is possible to cool it quickly and replace it with the spare one. The set of the gun contains a spare barrel. During the fire, cartridge cases are ejected forward, which increases the safety of the shooter and people nearby.

When conditions are extreme, the position of gas flow regulator can provide an adequate gas flow, so the machine gun will always function reliably.

The machine gun is loaded from belts. The set of the gun includes belts and ammunition boxes for the transport of belts, with the capacity of 60 rounds. Flash suppressor on the muzzle disperses powder gas and decreases the flash of the flame, hiding the position of the shooter.

== Operators ==
- Afghanistan
- Artsakh
- Cameroon
- Serbia
- Syrian National Coalition
- United Arab Emirates: Used by UAE-allied militia in the Al Hudaydah offensive
