= Zastava Trucks =

Former Serbian truck manufacturer

- Native name: Застава Камиони
- Romanized name: Zastava Kamioni
- Type: Subsidiary
- Industry: Automotive
- Founded: 3 January 1991; 35 years ago (Current form); 1953; 73 years ago (Originally founded)
- Defunct: 2017
- Fate: Bankruptcy procedure
- Successor: Zastava TERVO
- Headquarters: Kragujevac, Serbia
- Area served: Worldwide
- Products: Trucks
- Parent: Zastava Automobiles
- Website: www.zastava-kamioni.co.rs

Zastava Trucks (Serbian: Застава Камиони, romanized: Zastava Kamioni) was a Serbian truck manufacturer, subsidiary of Group Zastava Vehicles which declared bankruptcy in May 2017. In September 2017, the Government of Serbia established Zastava TERVO, which took over Zastava Trucks production facilities.

== History ==
Foundation

Production of Zastava commercial vehicles started in the period before the Second World War when 400 Chevrolet trucks were produced for the Royal Yugoslav Army. From 1953, 162 off-road vehicles with the trademark Willys were produced. Under licence from Fiat production of Fiat Campagnola AR-51 trucks and off-road vehicles started in 1955, followed by Fiat 1100TF vans.

1961–1991

In 1961, the vehicles "Zastava 615" and "Zastava 620" appeared on the market as the result of in-house development. This production had successful development up to 1969 when significant stagnation happened because of that time program and introduction of the new know-how. It is necessary to mention that in that period production of commercial vehicles was arranged in a frame of car factory.

For that reason, on 18 June 1969, the decision was made by Zastava to start with organization the factory "Fabrike privrednih vozila - Zastava" including long-term development program with the following goals: 1. to realize development within cooperation with Officine Meccaniche (part of FIAT) but to exceed license form of cooperation and to base the same on the work distribution through the long-term production cooperation 2. to provide production of the components through the cooperation as well as of the vital assemblies in the batches which provide economical production 3. to create conditions for production the modern commercial vehicles, well-known on the world market, and in that way also the conditions for their commercialization on the local and foreign market.

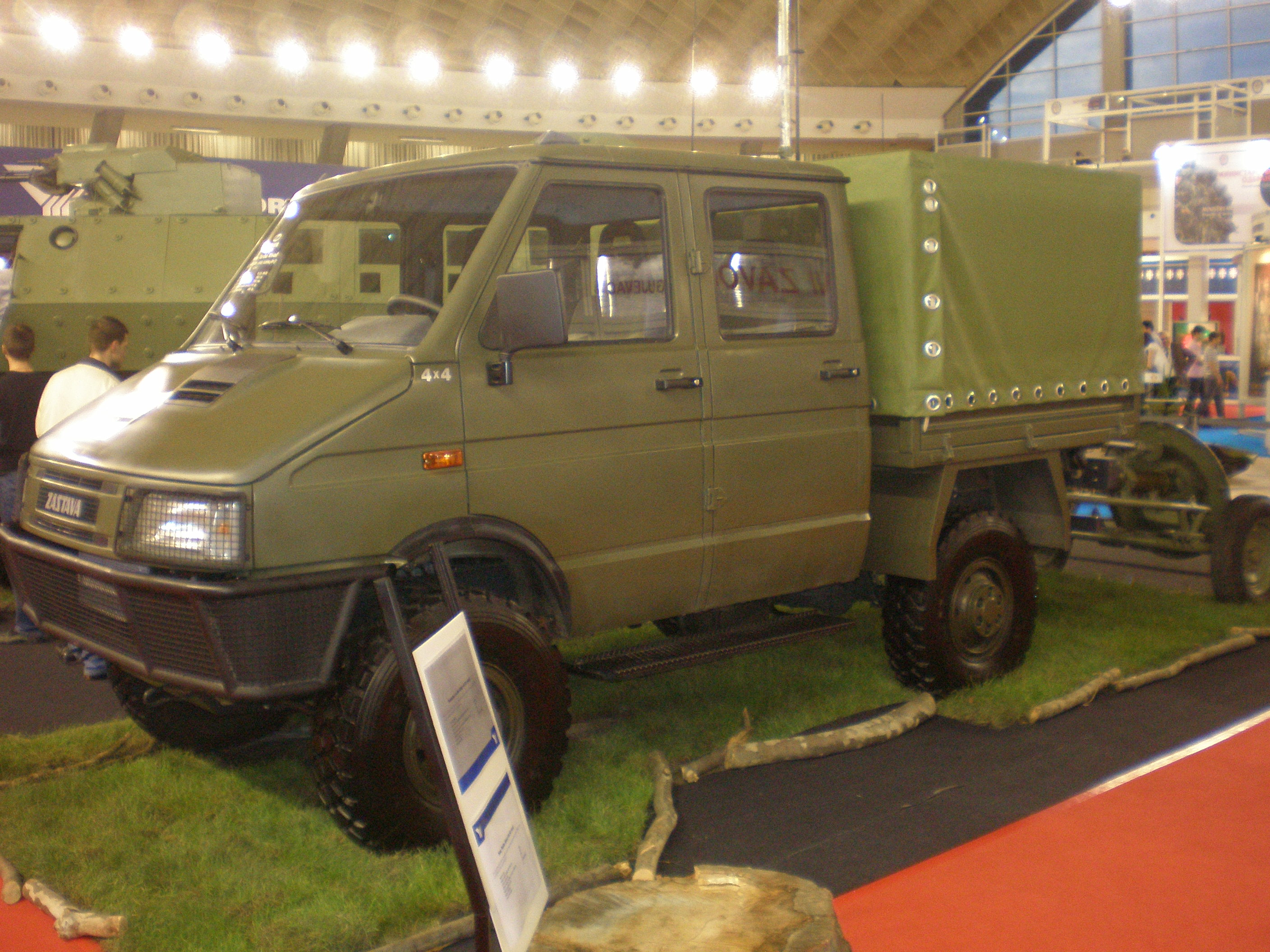
Zastava military truck based on the second-generation Iveco Daily

On the base of the new contracts with FIAT production started of light delivery vans with a payload of 0.6 t, in Sombor, in the newly opened III plant. In addition to the production of the vehicles, based on this contract, production started of front and rear axles, chassis frames and other components for the needs of ""Zastava" factory in Kragujevac as well as for the needs of the factory in Brescia. With the contract on long-term production cooperation, dated August 5, 1978, the new Gamma range of commercial vehicles, OM-40/35, so-called "MALI OM" was introduced. Soon after that FIAT IVECO transferred production of the Gamma vehicles to "Zastava-Privredna Vozila" (ZPV) so this Gamma isn't produced only for the local market's needs but also for sale through the partner's sales network.

1991–2015

Since 1 January 1991, Iveco has held a 46% stake and "Zastava Trucks" 54% in the joint venture company.

2015–2017 Shutdown

As of October 2015, only around 70 people were employed in the company, after several rounds of departure with severance payments. In May 2017, Group Zastava Vehicles, consisted of Zastava Automobiles, Zastava Trucks, Zastava INPRO and Zastava Special Automobiles, declared bankruptcy before the Economic Court in Kragujevac.

By conclusion of Government of Serbia in August 2017, a new company was formed - Zastava Tervo - all properties of former Zastava Trucks were transferred to new company.

== Production ==
With the contract on "KNOW HOW" and contract on industrial cooperation with Iveco, dated 1985 and 1988, the commercial vehicles range was expanded to:

- "X"-series, consisting of the 30.8; 35.8; and 40.8
- "Z"-series, consisting of the 50.9; 65.9; 65.12; 79.12; 79.14 and 109.14

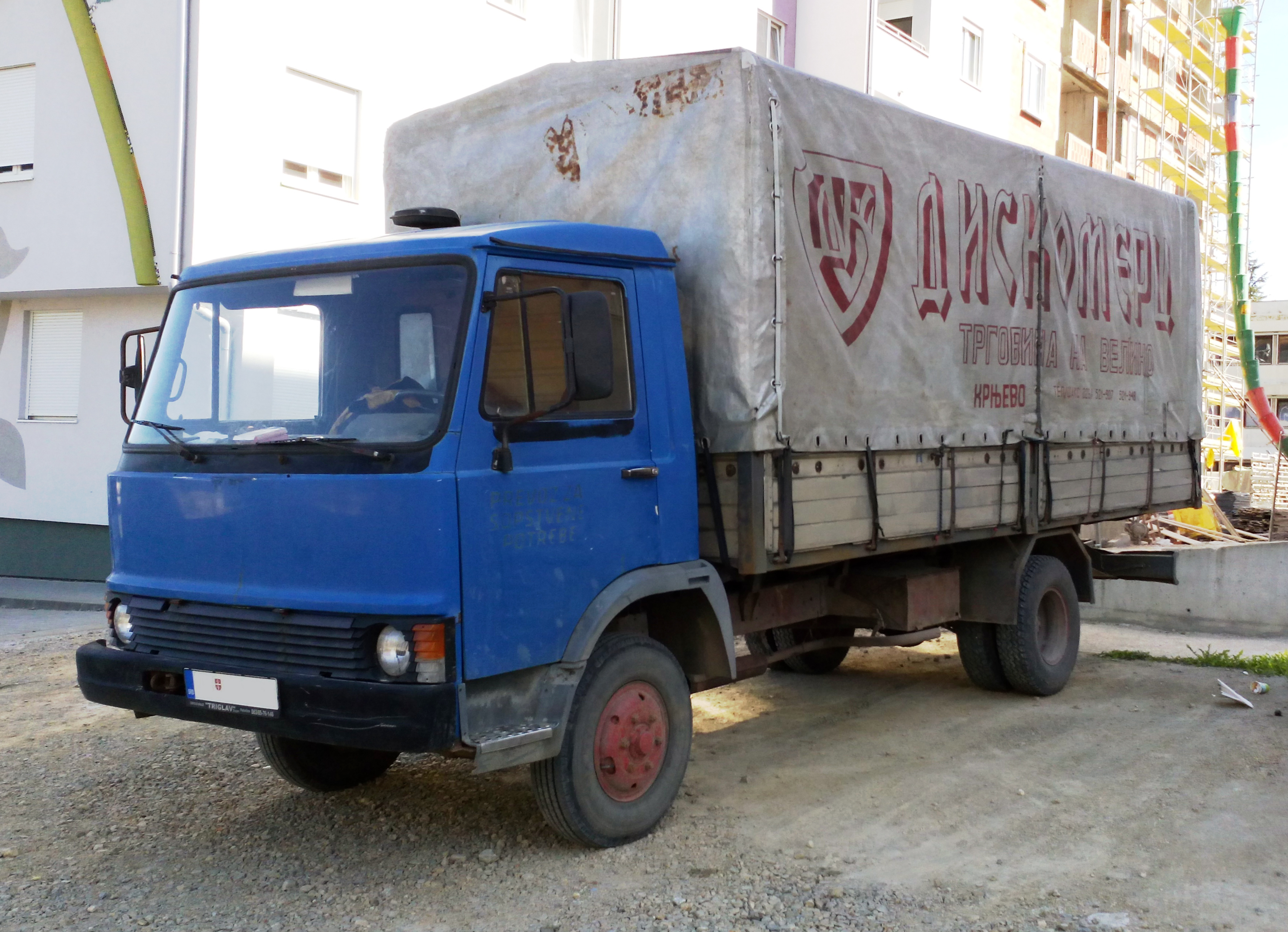
Zastava 645, based on "Z"-series trucks

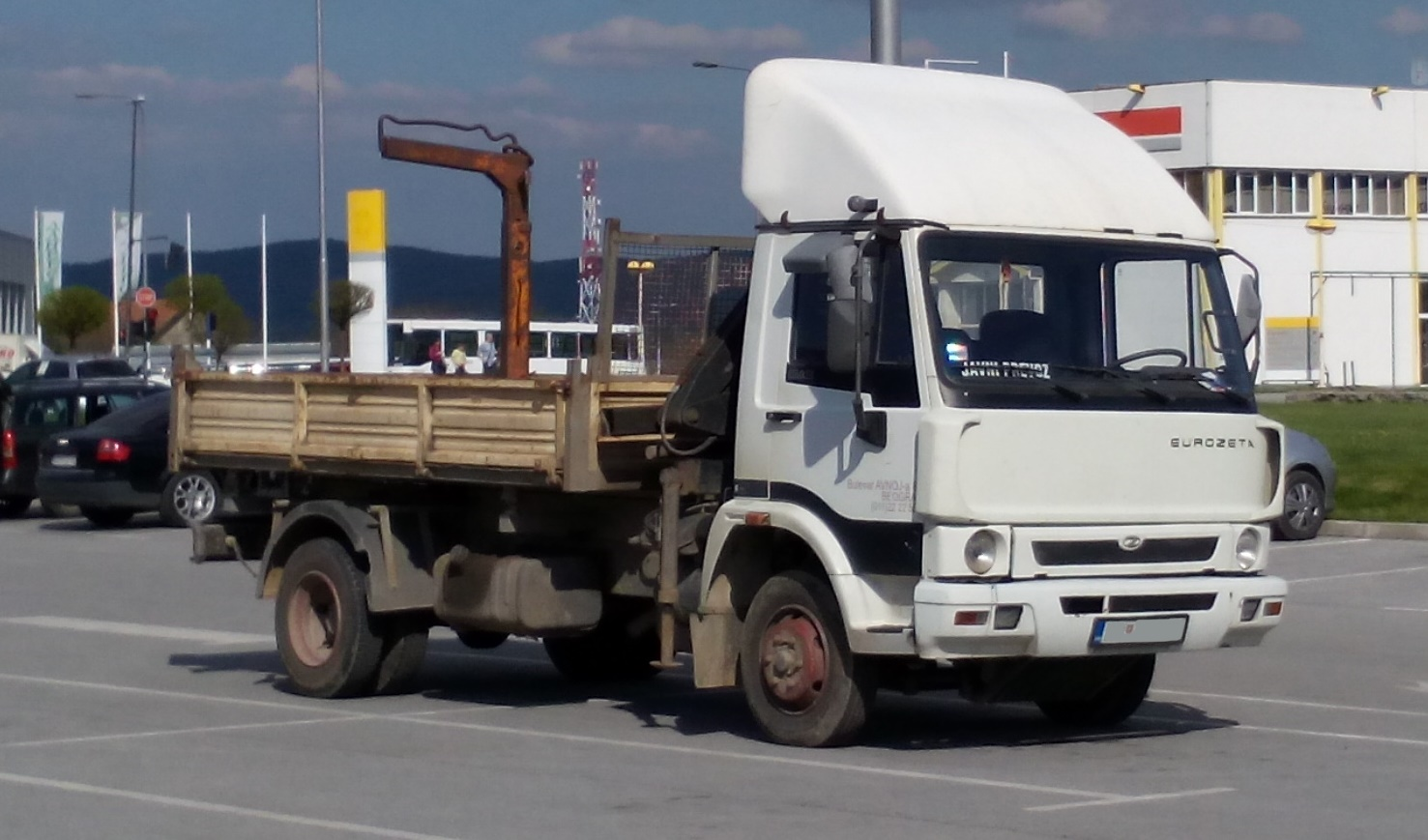
Zastava Euro Zeta, modern version of Zeta

- Production orientation for the Iveco's markets needs.

== See also ==
- Zastava Automobiles
- Defense industry of Serbia
