= Utva 66 =

Yugoslav light utility aircraft

UTVA-66
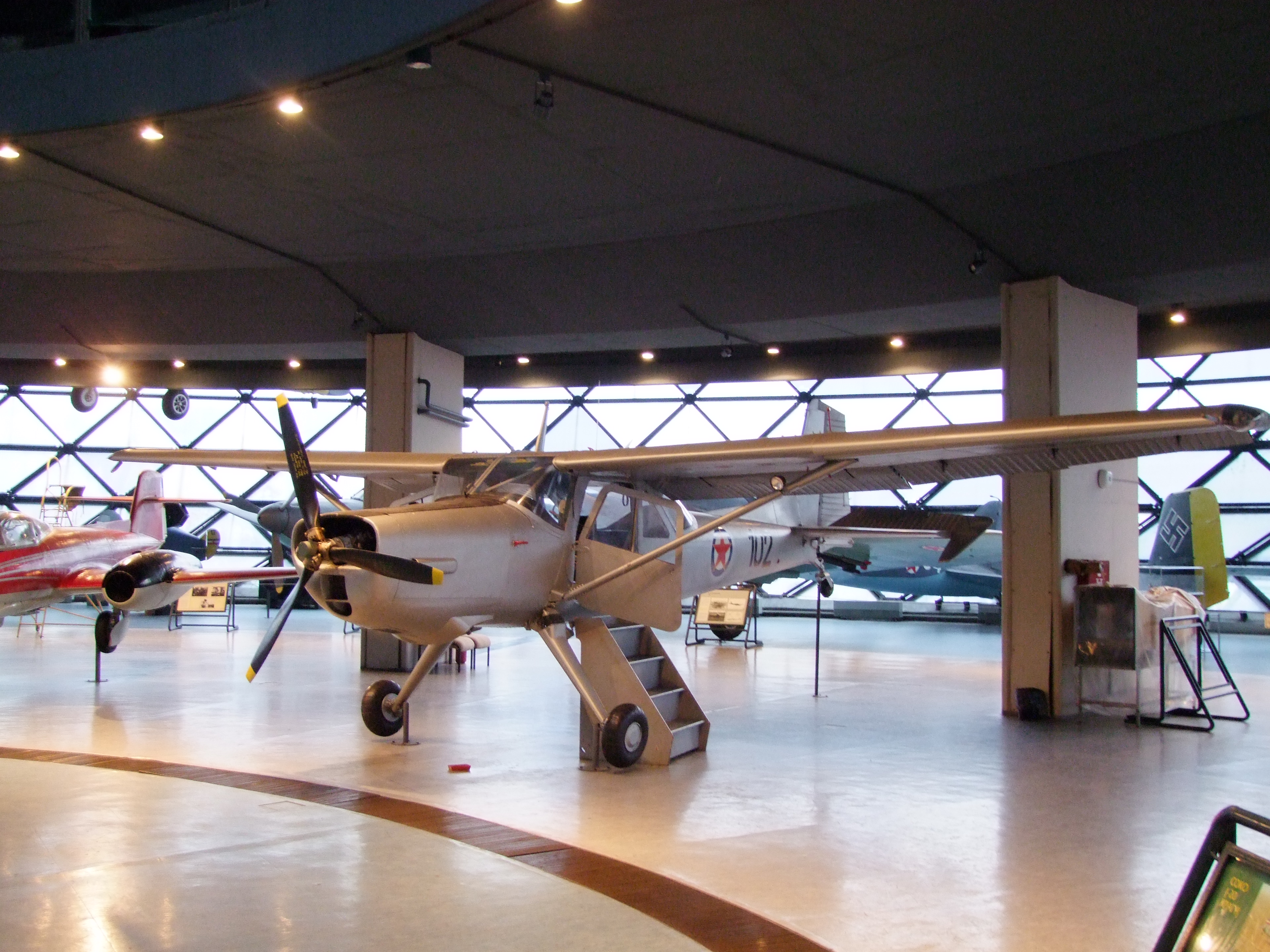
- UTVA-66 on display in the Museum of Aviation

General information
- Type: STOL light utility and liaison aircraft
- National origin: Yugoslavia
- Manufacturer: UTVA
- Designer: UTVA
- Status: Retired
- Primary user: Yugoslav Air Force
- Number built: About 130

History
- First flight: 1966
- Developed from: UTVA-56
- Variants: UTVA-66AM, UTVA-66H, UTVA-66V

The UTVA-66 is a STOL light utility and liaison aircraft produced in the former Yugoslavia. A development of the UTVA-56, it first flew in 1966 and was intended largely for use by the Yugoslav military.

== Description ==
The UTVA-66 was derived from the UTVA-56, featuring fixed leading-edge slats and a larger tail.

The aircraft was designed to operate from unprepared fields. Its STOL characteristics include fixed leading-edge slats, flaps and drooping ailerons. The cockpit is equipped with dual flight controls. In the ambulance version, the front right seat and rear seats could be removed to accommodate two stretchers. The 66H ("Hidro") variant replaced the fixed landing gear with pontoon floats for operation from bodies of water; these could also be exchanged for skis or wheels.

== Operational usage ==
About 130 UTVA-66 aircraft were manufactured.

During the Yugoslav Wars, some aircraft fell into Slovenian and Croatian hands. The last examples were withdrawn from military service in 1999.

A number of aircraft were exported or later appeared in civilian use outside the former Yugoslavia, including in Canada and the United States.

== Variants ==
- 66AM – Air ambulance version.
- 66H – Floatplane version.
- 66V – Armed variant with provisions for underwing armament.

== Former military operators ==
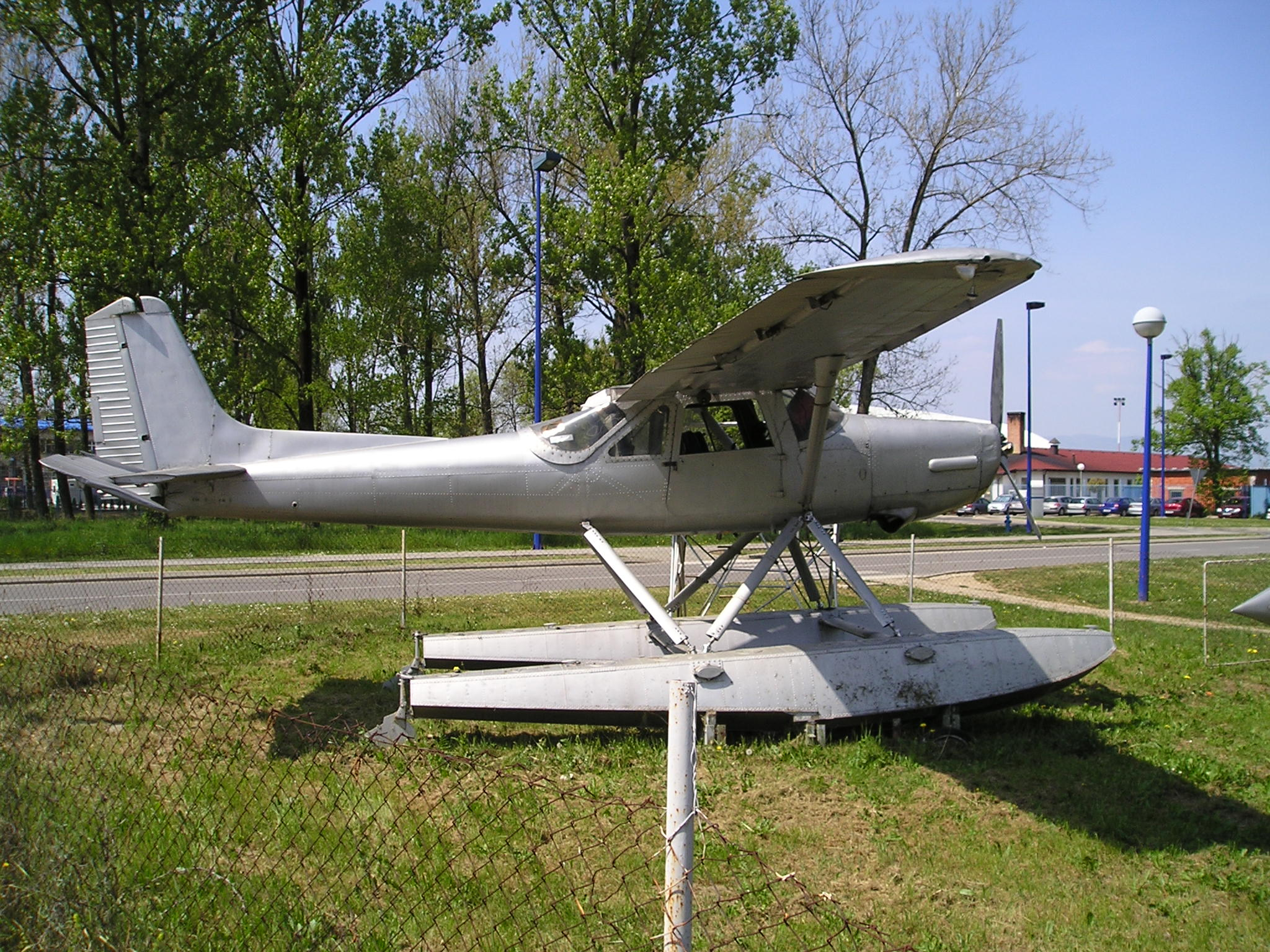
UTVA-66H

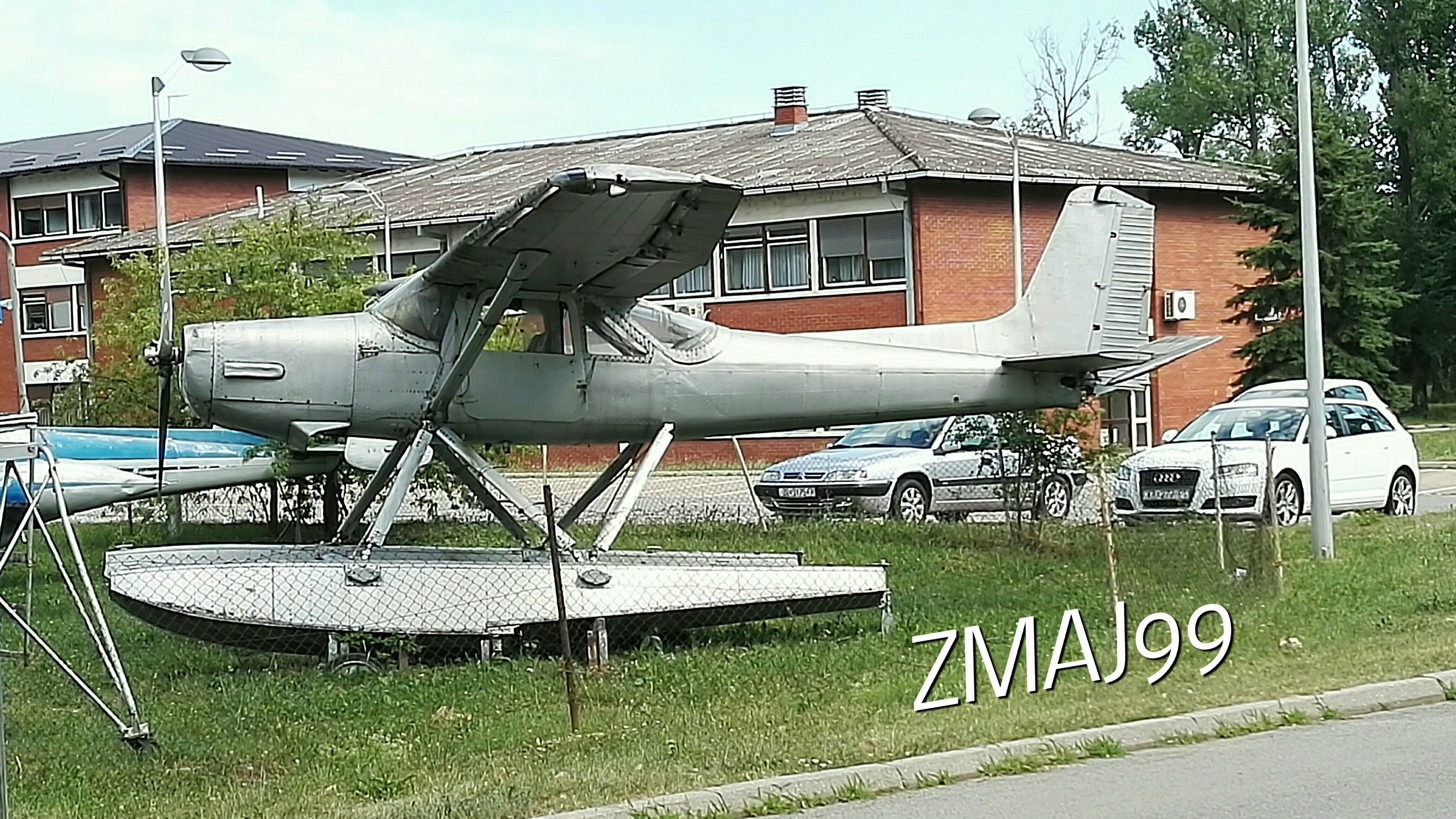
UTVA-66 with floats

Bosnia and Herzegovina

- Army of the Republic of Bosnia and Herzegovina

Croatia

- Croatian Air Force

North Macedonia

- North Macedonia Air Brigade

Republika Srpska

- Republika Srpska Air Force
  - 92nd Light Multi-role Squadron

Slovenia

- Slovenian Air Force

Yugoslavia

- Yugoslav Air Force

== Aircraft on display ==
Serbia

- Museum of Aviation (Belgrade) in Belgrade – a number of UTVA-66 aircraft, including the UTVA-66H, are on display.

== Specifications (UTVA-66) ==
Data from Jane's All the World's Aircraft 1971–72.

General characteristics

- Crew: 1
- Capacity:
  - 3 passengers or
  - 2 stretchers
- Length: 8.38 m (27 ft 6 in)
- Wingspan: 11.4 m (37 ft 5 in)
- Height: 3.20 m (10 ft 6 in)
- Wing area: 18.08 m^{2} (194.6 sq ft)
- Airfoil: NACA 4412 (modified)
- Empty weight: 1,250 kg (2,756 lb)
- Max takeoff weight: 1,814 kg (3,999 lb)
- Fuel capacity: 250 L (55 imp gal; 66 US gal)
- Powerplant: 1 × Lycoming GSO-480-B1J6 air-cooled flat-six engine, 200 kW (270 hp)

Performance

- Maximum speed: 250 km/h (160 mph, 130 kn) at optimum height
- Cruise speed: 230 km/h (140 mph, 120 kn) max cruise
- Stall speed: 80 km/h (50 mph, 43 kn)
- Never exceed speed: 320 km/h (200 mph, 170 kn)
- Range: 750 km (470 mi, 400 nmi)
- Service ceiling: 6,700 m (22,000 ft)
- Rate of climb: 4.50 m/s (885 ft/min)
- Takeoff run to 15 m (50 ft): 352 m (1,155 ft)
- Landing run from 15 m (50 ft): 181 m (594 ft)

== See also ==
- UTVA 75

Aircraft of comparable role, configuration, and era

- Aermacchi AM.3
- SIAI-Marchetti SM.1019
- UTVA-60
