= 42 Squadron SAAF =

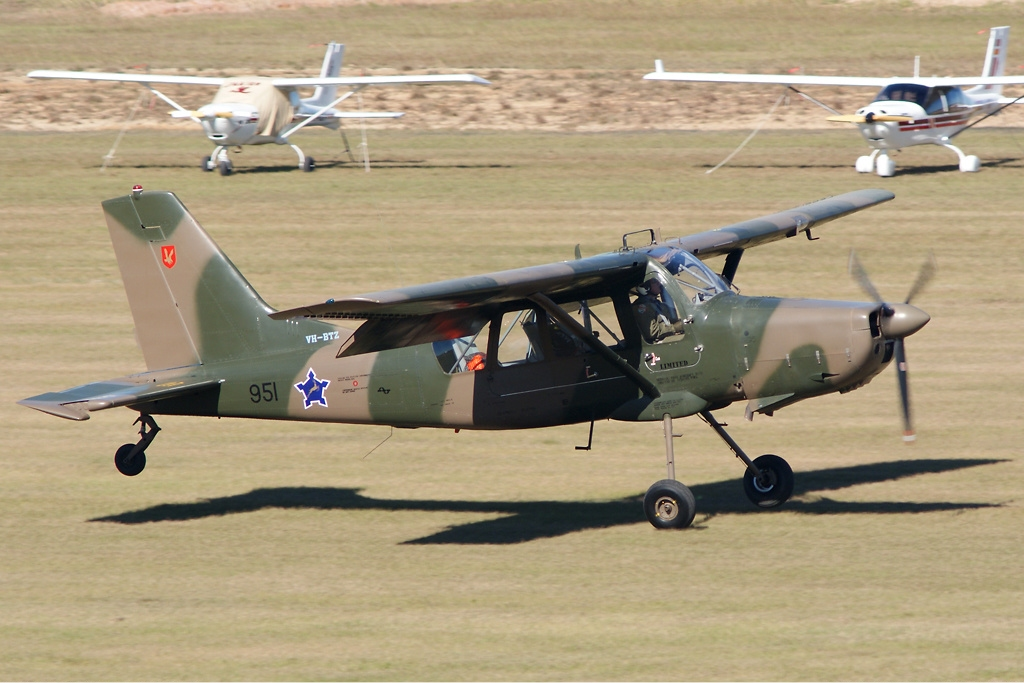
- Aeritalia/Aermacchi AM.3CM Bosbok, as flown by 42 Squadron
- Active: 23 January 1945–2000
- Country: (South Africa)
- Branch: South African Air Force
- Last base: AFB Waterkloof
- Motto(s): Per Spicimus (We survey)

Aircraft flown
- Reconnaissance: Auster, Auster AOP6, Auster AOP9, Cessna 185, Atlas Bosbok, Atlas Kudu, Pilatus PC-6

42 Squadron SAAF is a disbanded squadron of the South African Air Force, active from 1945 to 2000. The squadron's main role was to spot enemy artillery. The unit was formed in 1945 as 42 AOP Flight, flying Austers under command of an officer of the SA Artillery and was the only army aviation unit flying for South African forces during World War II.

After the war, the squadron was sent back to South Africa, where they were based at Potchefstroom. The flight became 42 Squadron in the 1950s when control of the flight was transferred to the SAAF. In 1962, the squadron's Austers were phased out and replaced with Cessna 185s, Atlas Bosboks and Atlas Kudus. The squadron relocated to AFB Swartkop in 1992 and to AFB Waterkloof in 2000, the same year the squadron was disbanded.

== History ==
=== World War II ===
The squadron was first formed in Bari, Italy during World War II on 23 January 1945. Many of the pilots were selected from the South African Air Force and given extra training to prepare the pilots for their artillery-spotting duties. The flight flew Auster aircraft in Europe. The flight relocated often as they moved from base to base in Europe as the German forces retreated from Italy until the end of the war. At the end of the war, 42 AOP Flight and their Auster aircraft were shipped back to South Africa and were based at Potchefstroom, home of the SA artillery. The flight's first two army pilots that were not taken from the SAAF were trained at Central Flying School SAAF during 1949.

=== Post war ===
In the 1950s, the SAAF was given control of 42 Flight and the flight became 42 Squadron SAAF. 42 Squadron received Auster AOP9 and Auster AOP6 aircraft between 1953 and 1957. In May 1962, the Cessna 185 aircraft entered service with 42 Squadron and the Austers were phased out. In 1974, the Atlas Bosbok was added to the fleet, and later, the Atlas Kudu was added.

=== Border War ===
42 Squadron and their Bosboks were deployed to Angola in the 70s to the 80s during the South African Border War to serve as artillery spotters and target markers using smoke rockets.

During Operation Protea, at the battle of Xangongo, Captain Danie Laubscher of 42 Squadron was awarded the Honoris Crux decoration for bravery. Battle Group 20s attack on Xangongo was held up by ZU-23-2 AA guns. Two attacks by Dassault Mirage aircraft failed to destroy the site and a third attack by artillery was not successful either. Captain Laubscher's smoke rockets had failed to narrow the Mirages' attack so he decided to attempt a direct hit with smoke rockets to accurately mark the target for the Mirages. He dive bombed the target firing one smoke rocket directly into the gun position but the Mirages were out of ordnance and fuel. The ground attack had resumed by this time without any enemy ZU-23-2 fire. It was later found that his smoke rocket had hit the operator of the gun.

=== Disbandment ===
The Cessna 185s remained in service for longer than the Kudus, which were retired in 1991, and the Bosboks, which were retired in 1992. The squadron relocated to AFB Swartkop in 1992. In 1994, the squadron received a Pilatus PC-6/B2-H4 from the Bophuthatswana Defence Force, in 1999 it was transferred to the South African Police Service. The squadron moved to AFB Waterkloof in early 2000 and was disbanded later that year. After the squadron's disbandment in February 2000, all remaining Cessna 185s were transferred to 44 Squadron SAAF.

== Aircraft ==
Aircraft flown by 42 Squadron
Note: Aircraft type photographs may not necessarily represent aircraft of the same mark or actual aircraft belonging to the squadron.
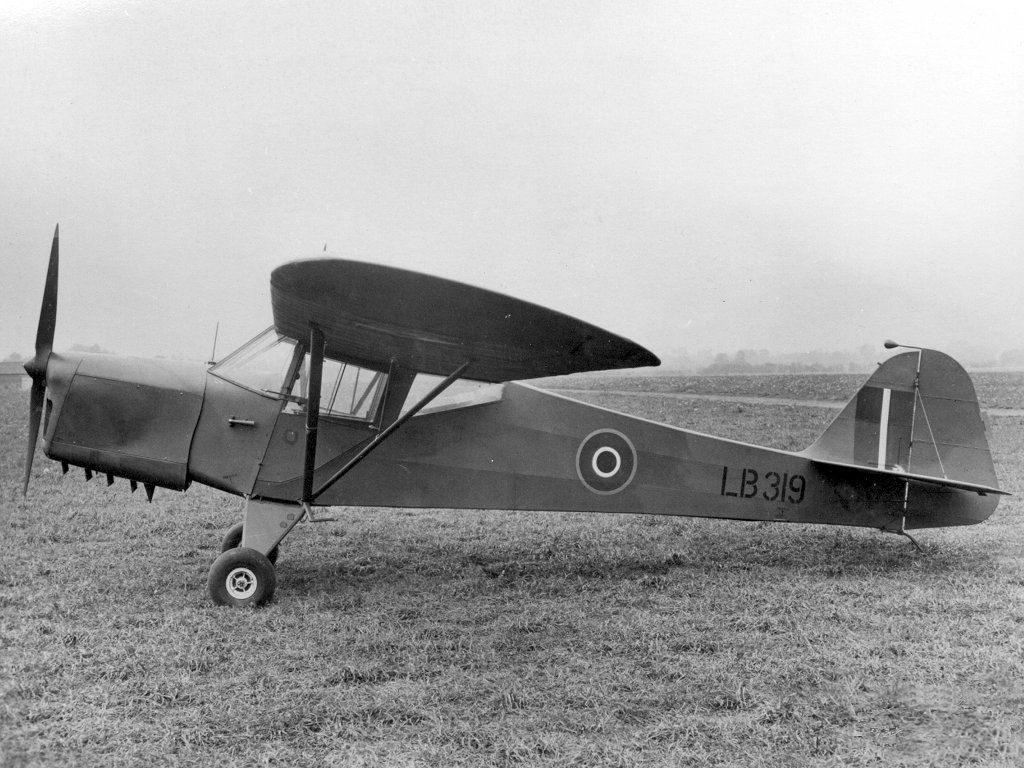
Auster
1945–1953

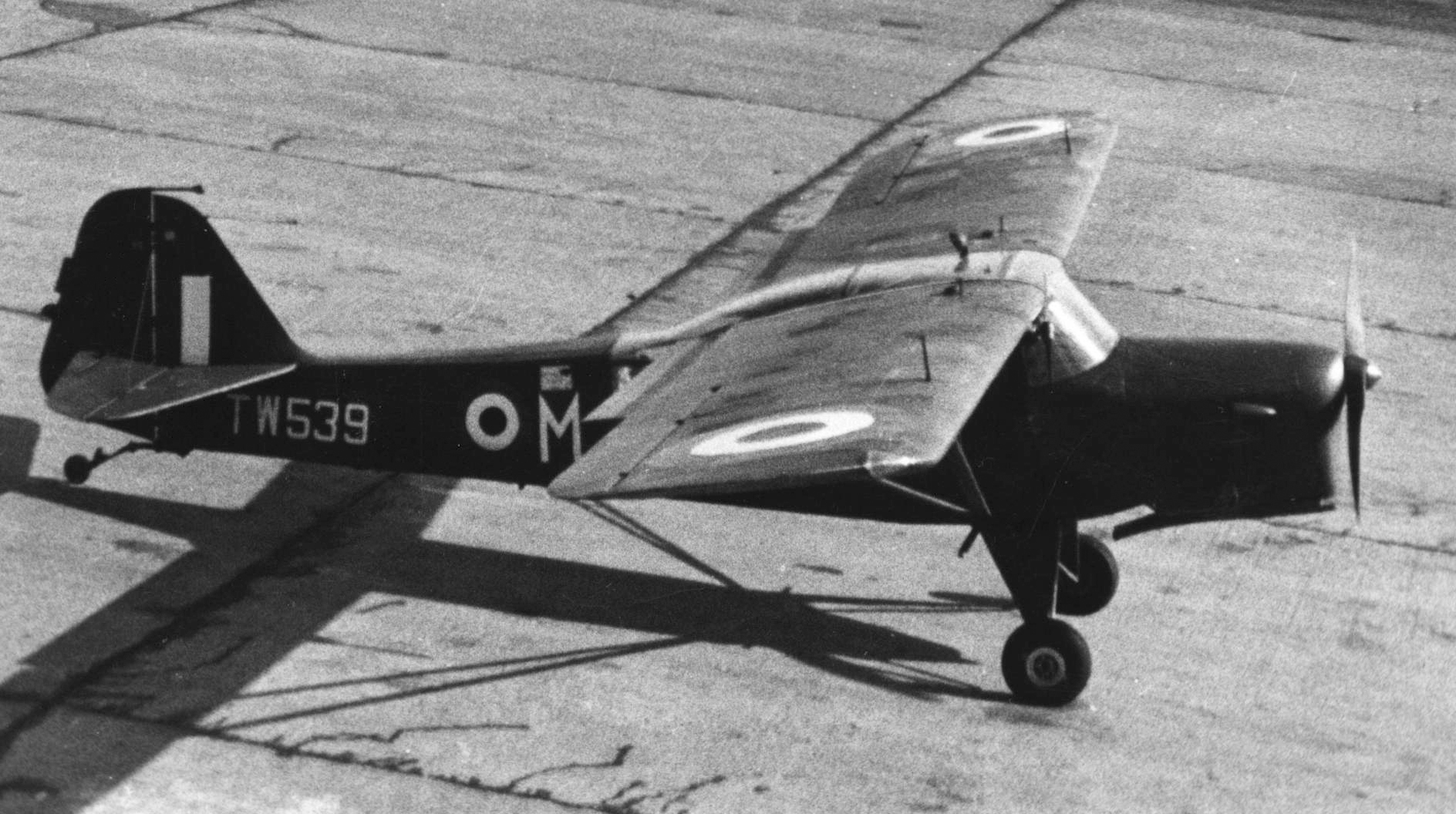
Auster AOP.6
1953–1962

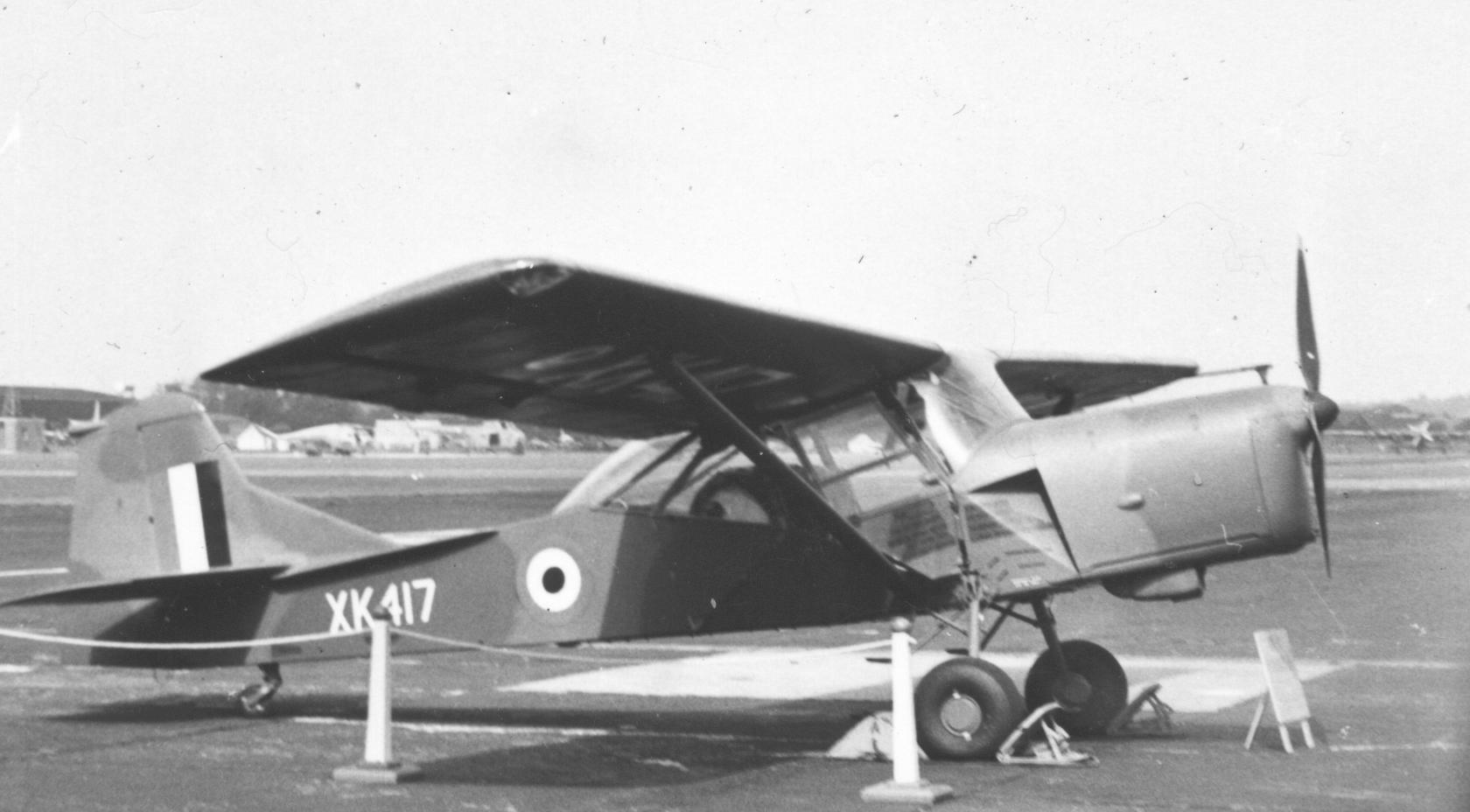
Auster AOP.9
1953–1962

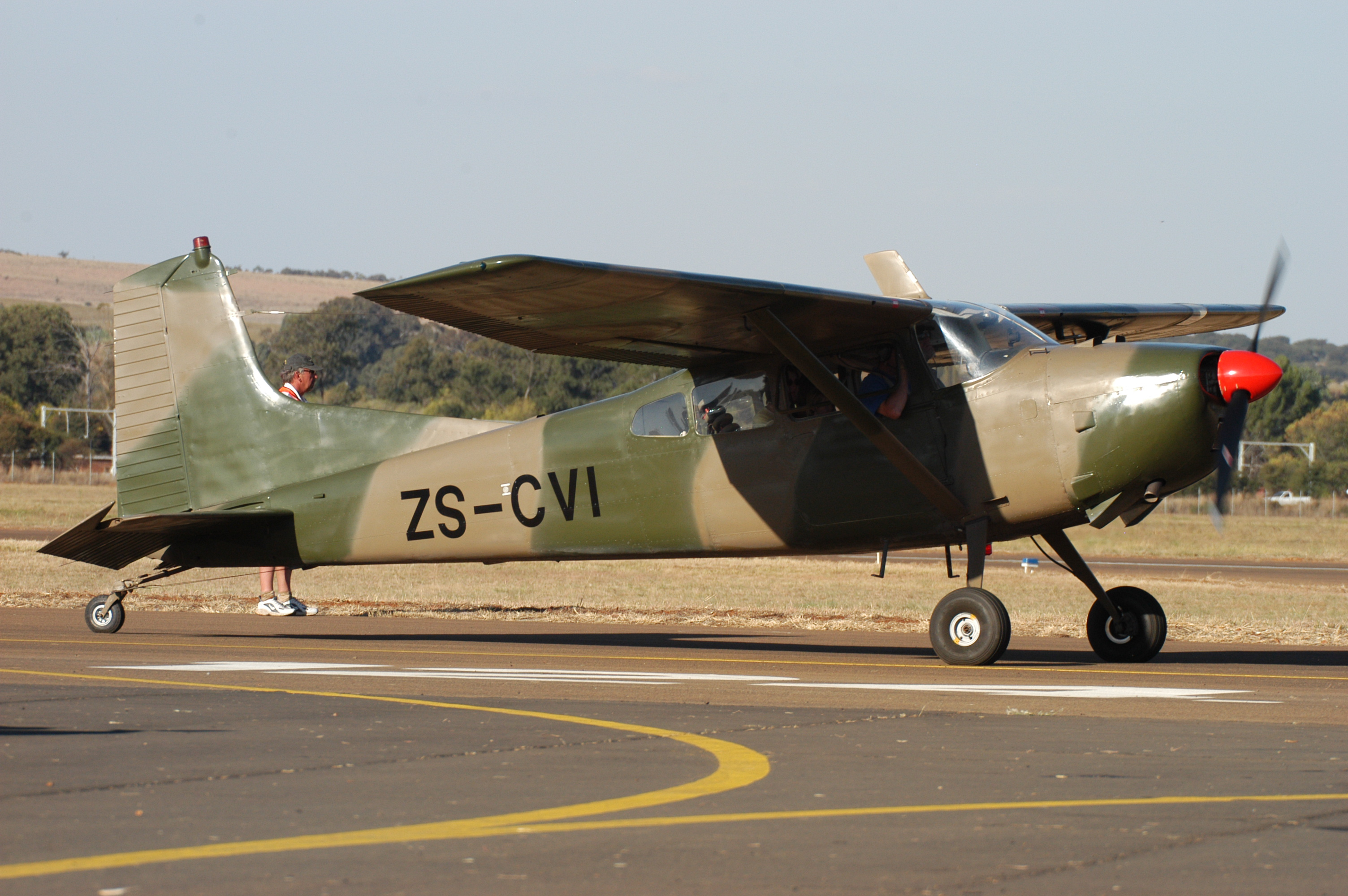
Cessna 185 Skywagon
1962–2000

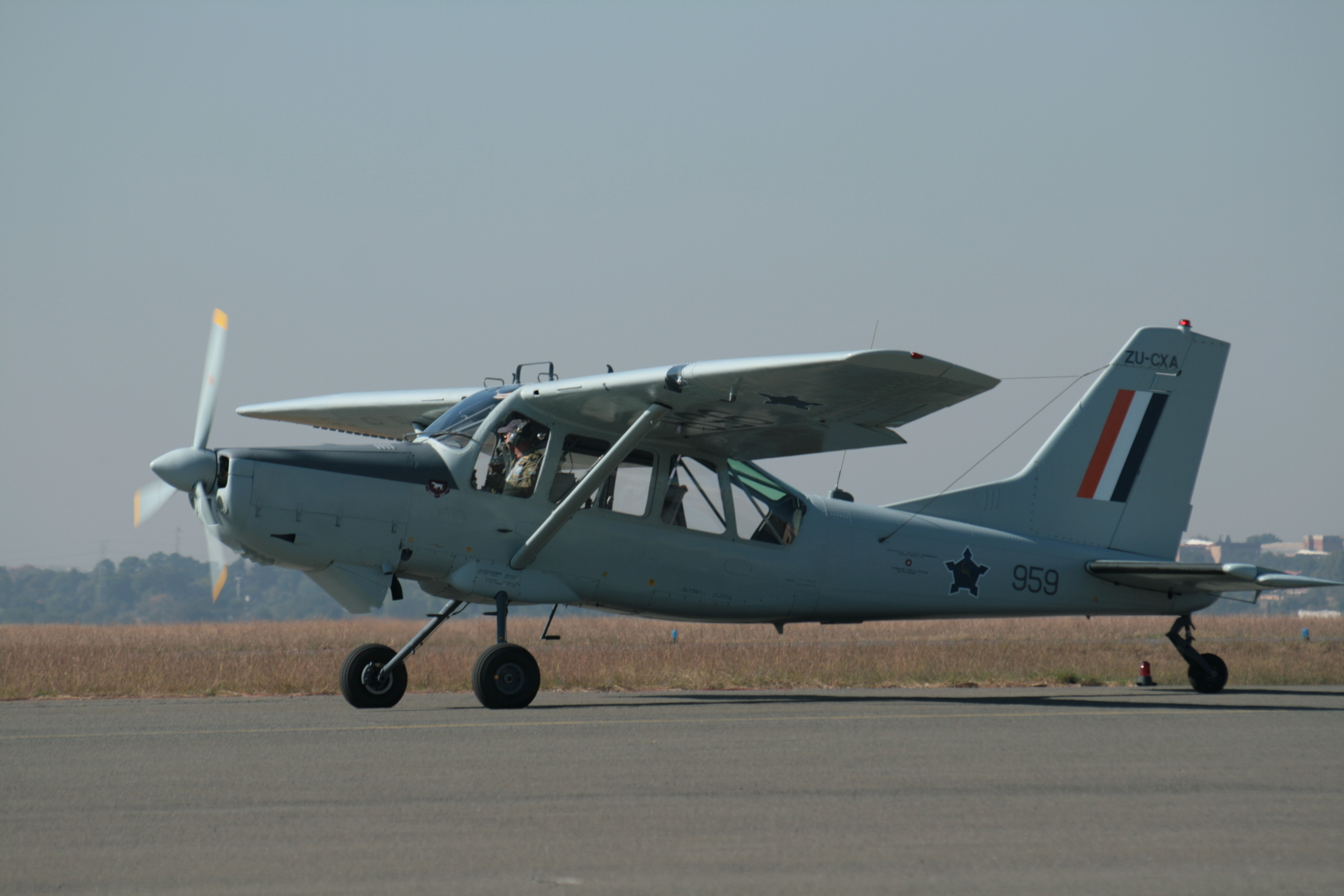
AM.3CM Bosbok
1974–1992

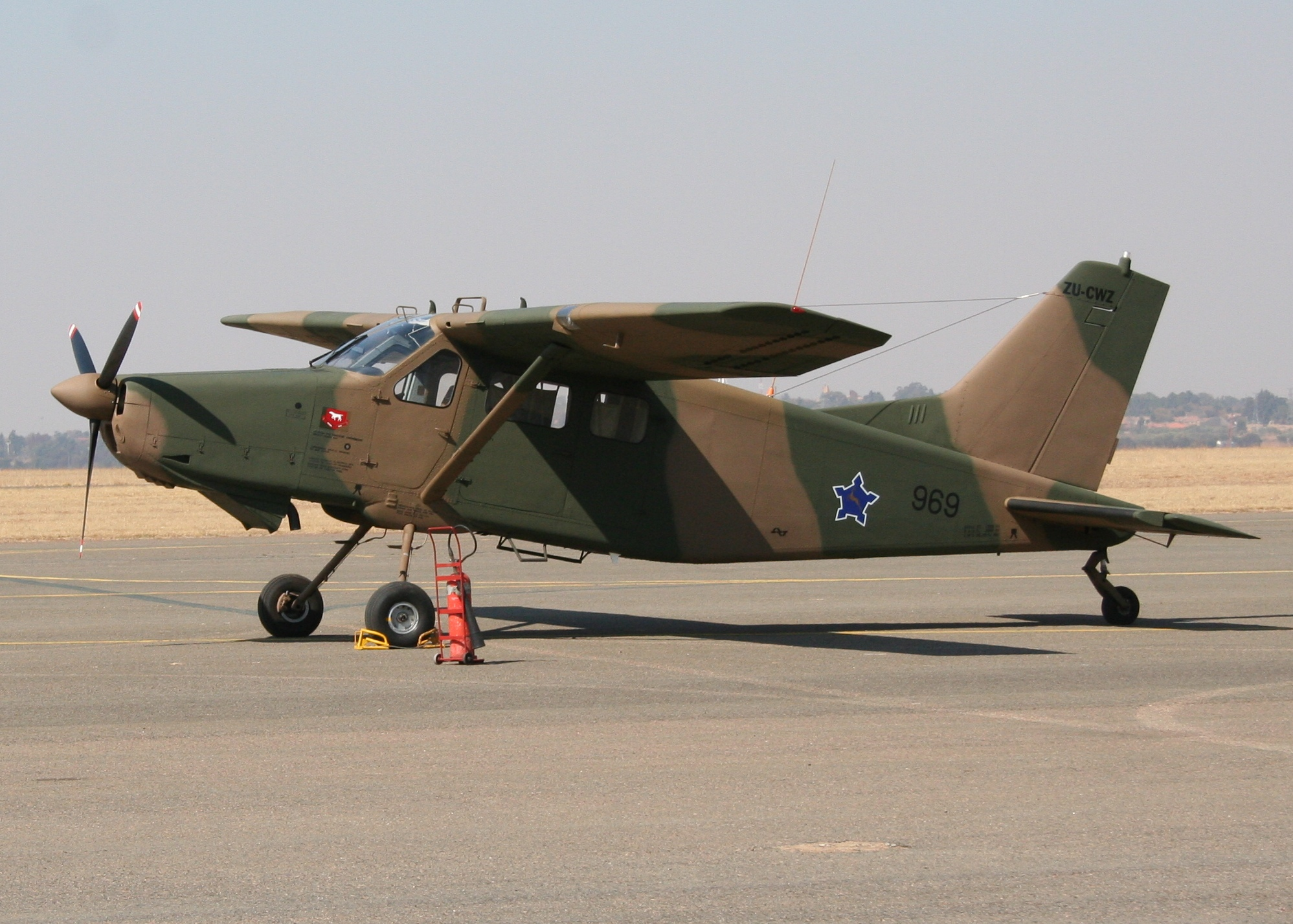
Atlas C.4M Kudu
1974–1991

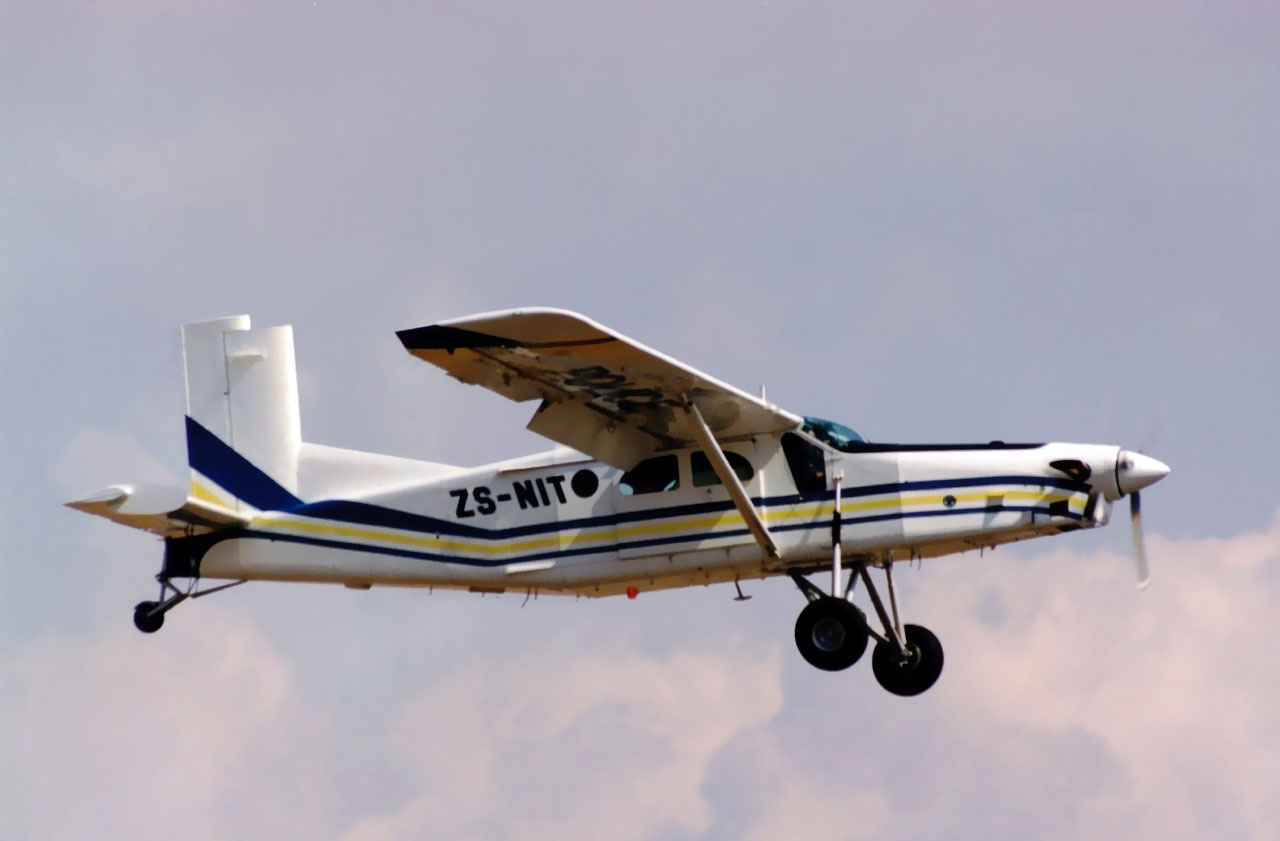
Pilatus PC-6/B2-H4
1994–1999
ZS-NIT (Pictured) Crashed on 30 August 2022 killing 4 out of 5 occupants
