= UTVA Kobac =

Type of aircraft

Kobac
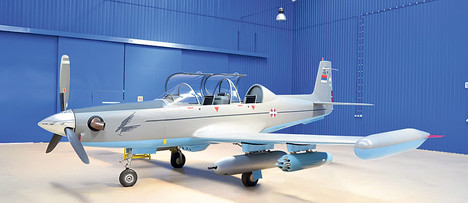
- A mock-up of the aircraft

General information
- Type: Trainer aircraft, attack aircraft
- Manufacturer: Utva Aviation Industry
- Designer: Military Technical Institute
- Status: Cancelled
- Primary user: Serbian Air Force (planned)
- Number built: 0 completed

History
- Introduction date: 2012
- First flight: Never flown

The UTVA Kobac (English: Sparrowhawk) was a prototype Serbian single-engine, low-wing, tandem-seat turboprop training and light attack aircraft manufactured by the Pančevo-based Utva Aviation Industry and designed by the Military Technical Institute. Revealed as a mockup on 2 September 2012 during that year's Batajnica air show, the aircraft's first flight was planned for 2013, but was never realized.

== Design Concept ==
Based on the proven UTVA Lasta 95P-2 tandem two-seat low-wing trainer, the Kobac promised a 500 kilometres per hour (310 mph) maximum speed and was intended to serve the Serbian Air force and export customers with advanced training in all weather conditions. Equipped with the capability to conduct border patrols and strikes against ground-based targets, the aircraft was touted as a close air support, counterinsurgency, and reconnaissance aircraft similar to the Super Tucano and Texan II.

The Kobac concept envisioned modifications to the Lasta platform to suit advanced new roles. Most importantly it was planned to be powered by a 750 shp (560 kW) turboprop engine housed in a lengthened nose and possess five hard points for the carriage of more than 500 kilograms (1,100 lb) of stores.

Two engine options were planned to be offered in the production version of the Kobac. The 750 shp (560 kW) Pratt & Whitney Canada PT6A-25C and the Ukrainian built 730 shp (540 kW) Ivchenko-Progress Motor Sich AI-450S. To handle the increase in power, the rear fuselage of the Lasta airframe was lengthened and a new rear fin was designed. Additionally, 190 kilograms (420 lb) fuel tip tanks were planned to complement the 156 kilograms (344 lb) internal fuel capacity, raising the Kobac flight endurance to approximately five hours or 1,500 kilometres (930 mi).

All four underwing pylons of the Kobac were intended to carry unguided munitions, tube rocket launchers and gun pods for either a 12.7-mm (0.5-inch) machine gun or 20 millimetres (0.79 in) autocannon. The outer wing pylons were intended for mounting air-to-air missiles, air-to-surface missiles or racks for practice bombs; while the centreline hardpoint was designed to carry an electronic warfare pod.

UTVA redesigned the Kobac cockpit with a new canopy offering better visibility than the Lasta-95. The rear seat was raised by approximately 10 centimetres (4 in) to give the back-seater better forward vision and both positions were to be fitted with Martin-Baker Mk 15B lightweight ejection seats. A modern three-screen cockpit was installed in the Kobac mockup, with a large central multifunction display for tactical displays and sensor imagery. Control of the system was to be by HOTAS (hands-on throttle and stick) and a navigation and attack system was reportedly devised with sensors mounted in a low-profile pallet under the centre fuselage.

== Specifications (Kobac prototype) ==
General characteristics

- Crew: Two, student and instructor
- Empty weight: 1,325 kg (2,921 lb)
- Gross weight: 1,700 kg (3,748 lb)
- Powerplant: 1 × Pratt & Whitney Canada PT6A-62 turboprop, 857 kW (1,149 hp)flat-rated at 708 kW (950 shp)

Performance

- Maximum speed: 555 km/h (345 mph, 300 kn)
- Cruise speed: 500 km/h (310 mph, 270 kn) at 7,620 m (25,000 ft)
- Stall speed: 143 km/h (89 mph, 77 kn) EAS flaps and gear up, 128 km/h (80 mph; 69 kn) flaps and gear down
- Range: 1,537 km (955 mi, 830 nmi)
- Service ceiling: 11,580 m (37,990 ft)
- g limits: + 6.0 g to −3.0 g
- Rate of climb: 20.8 m/s (4,090 ft/min)
- Take-off distance over 50 ft (15 m) obstacle at sea level: 1,280 ft (296 m)
- Landing distance over 50 ft (15 m) obstacle at sea level: 2,295 ft (510 m)

== Video promotion ==
- KOBAC - turboprop training aircraft - Al Jazeera Balkans

== See also ==
Aircraft of comparable role, configuration, and era

- KAI KT-1
- PZL-130 Orlik
- Pilatus PC-9
- Embraer EMB 314 Super Tucano
- Embraer EMB 312 Tucano
- Short Tucano
- Texan II
- TAI Hürkuş
