= Gavran 145 =

Serbian loitering munition

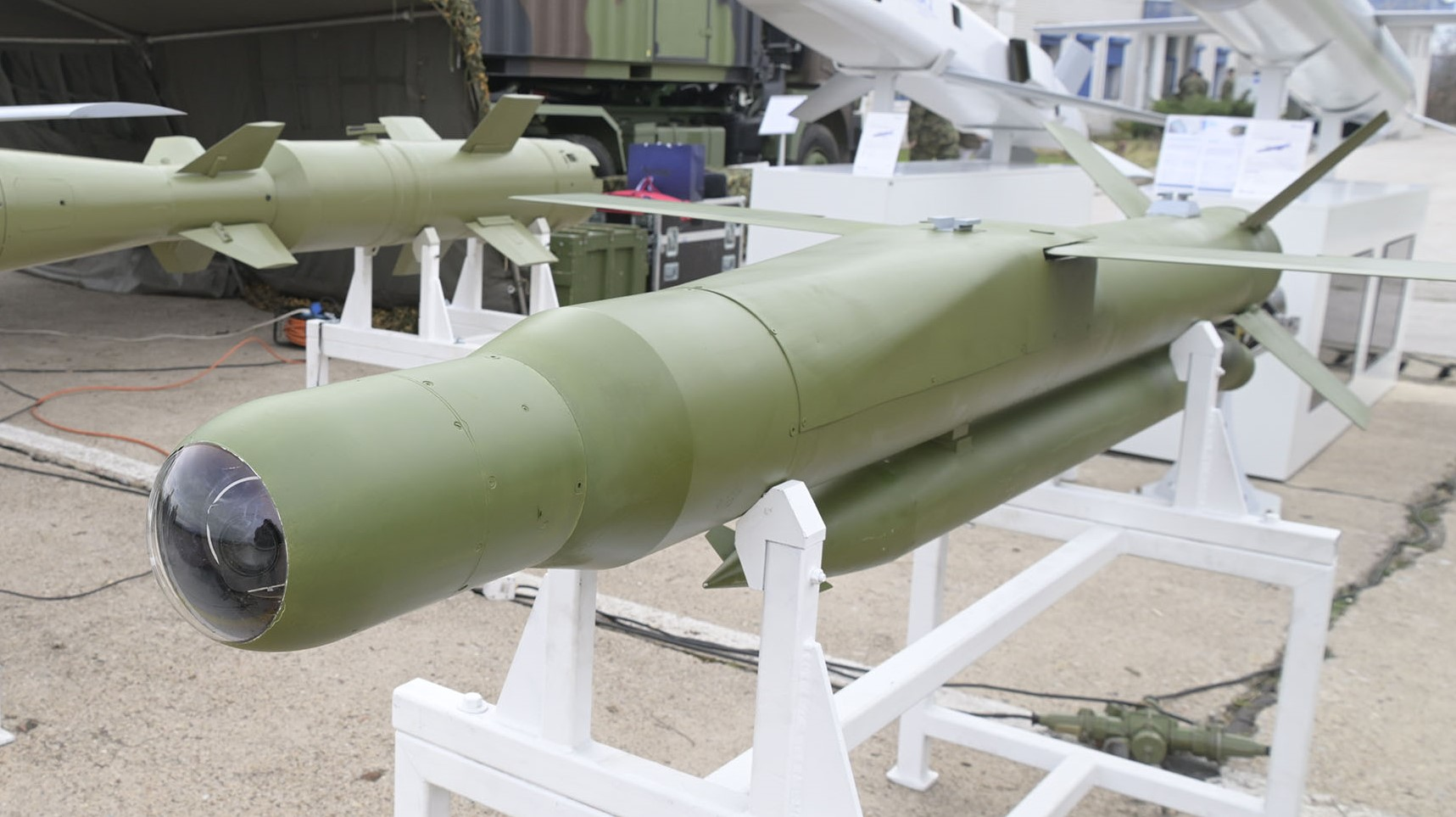

General information
- Type: Loitering munition
- National origin: Serbia
- Manufacturer: Utva Aviation Industry
- Designer: Military Technical Institute
- Status: In service
- Primary user: Serbian Army

History
- Manufactured: 2021–present
- Introduction date: 2025
- First flight: 2021

The Gavran 145 (Serbian: Гавран-145, lit. 'Raven') is a Serbian loitering unmanned aerial system, designed by the Military Technical Institute and manufactured by the Utva Aviation Industry.

== History ==
The Gavran 145 was first showcased at the 2022 Eurosatory international weapons trade fair. It was accepted into service with the Serbian Army in 2025.

== Characteristics ==
The Gavran 145 is a fully autonomous loitering unmanned aerial system designed for long-range surveillance and precision strikes. It allows operators to loiter over target areas for extended periods before committing to a strike, reducing collateral damage and enabling mission abortion if needed.

The system can be launched from ground-based canisters on trucks or trailers, making it highly mobile for frontline use.

It is among the few loitering munitions in its class (weighing 30 to 50 kg) that has the ability to circle the target area for up to 10 hours, with a cruising speed of 45 m/s and a maximum descent speed of 75 m/s. In addition, according to the designers, it has the best efficiency compared to the competition when it comes to the ratio of the mass of the aircraft to the mass of the payload (8 to 15 kg).

=== Specifications ===
- Length: 2,2 m
- Wingspan: 2,4 m
- Weight: 50 kg
- Engine: electric motor
- Speed: 160 km/h
- Altitude: up to 2,000 m
- Endurance: 10 hours
- Range: 50 km / 150 km
- Warhead: 8 to 15 kg, capable of penetrating 1,000 mm of rolled homogeneous armor
- Guidance: electro-optical camera with target tracking function
- Operation: wireless radio link

== Operators ==
- Serbia – Serbian Army

== See also ==
- Osica
- Komarac
