= SIAI-Marchetti SM.1019 =

Italian STOL liaison monoplane by SIAI-Marchetti

SM.1019
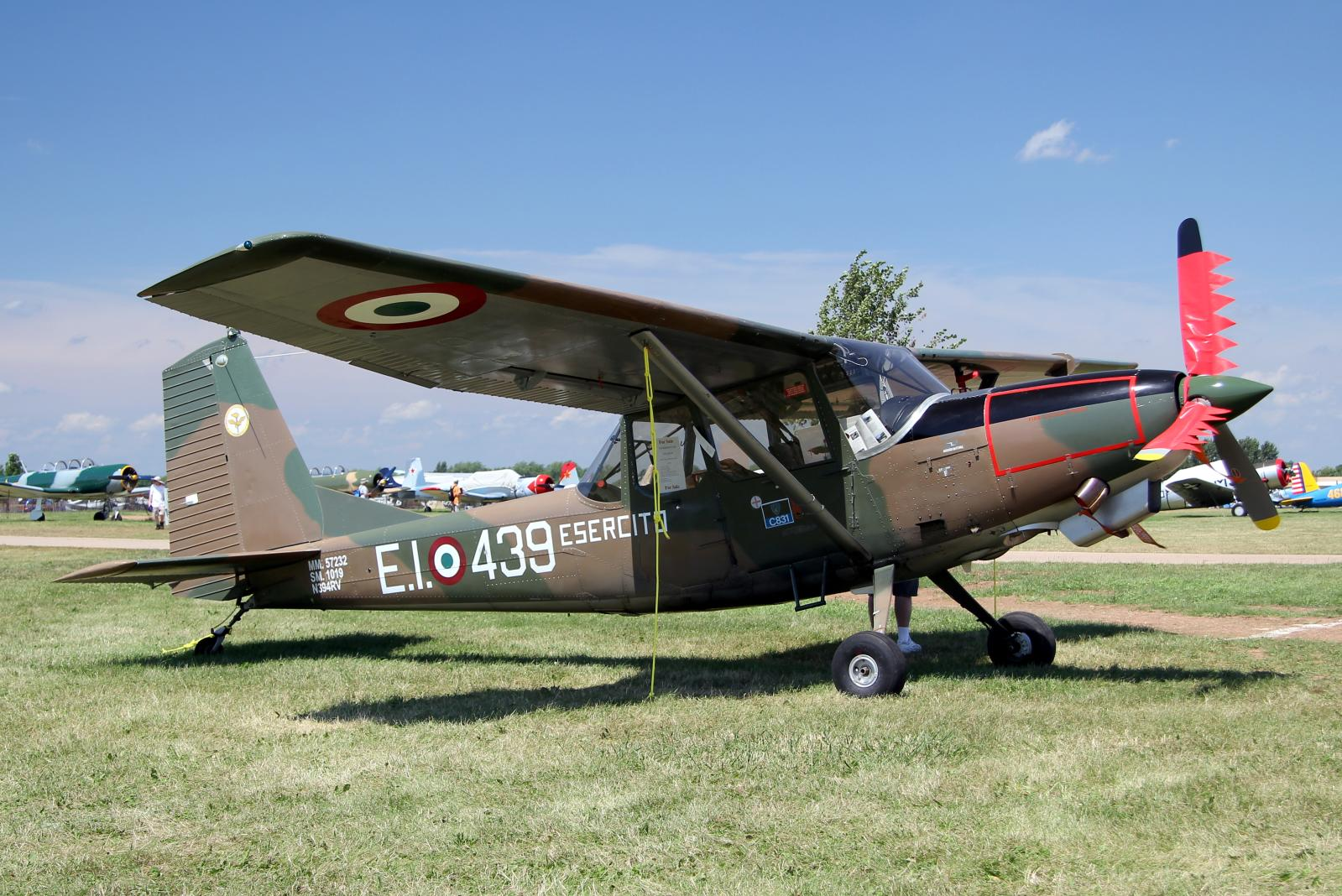

General information
- Type: STOL liaison monoplane
- National origin: United States / Italy
- Manufacturer: SIAI-Marchetti
- Primary users: Italian Army Somali Air Force
- Number built: 86

History
- Introduction date: 1976
- First flight: 24 May 1969
- Developed from: Cessna O-1 Bird Dog

The SIAI-Marchetti SM.1019 is an Italian STOL liaison monoplane built by SIAI-Marchetti for the Italian Army. It is a turboprop-powered derivative of the Cessna O-1 Bird Dog.

== Development ==
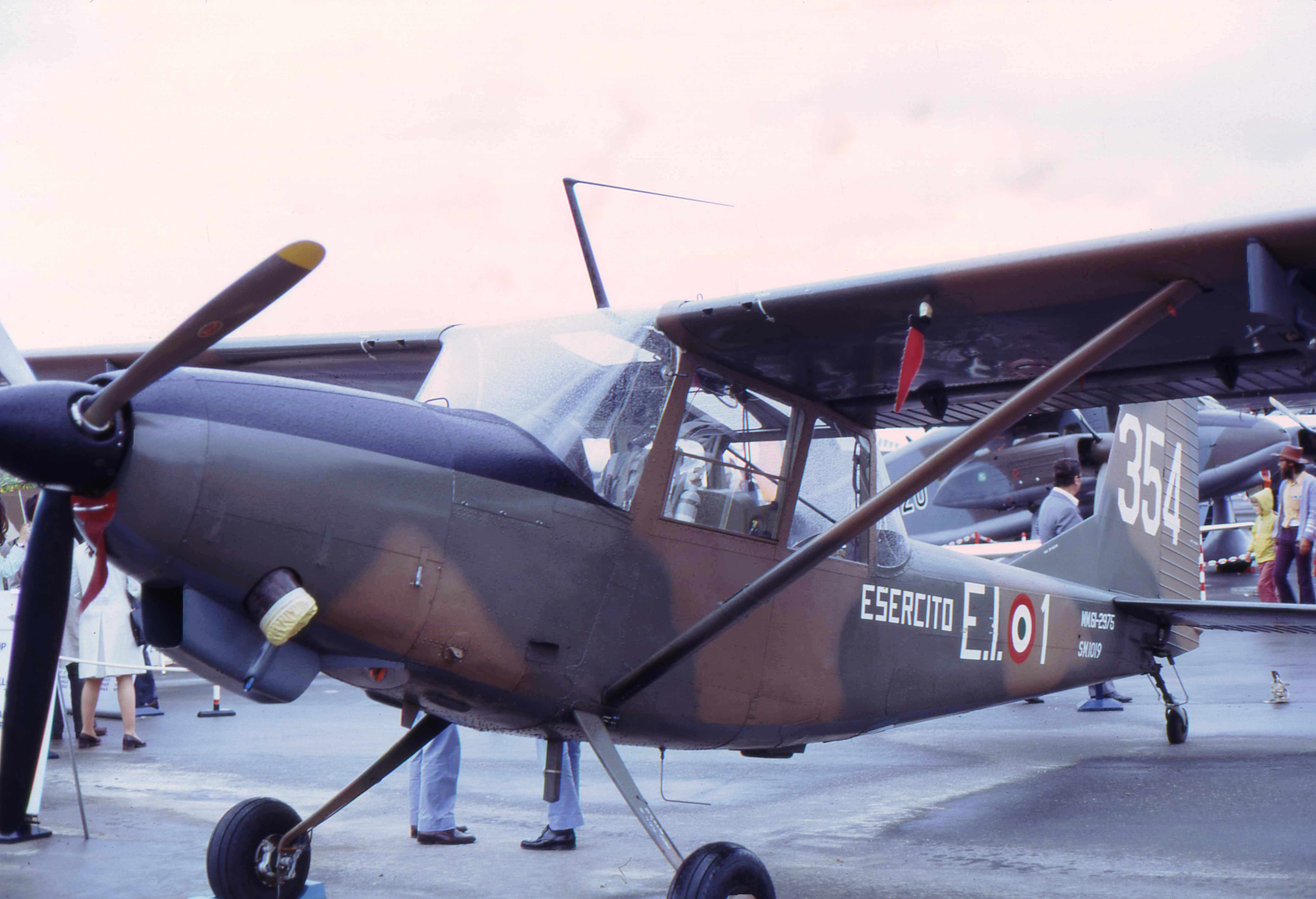
The SM.1019A in the colours of the Italian Army

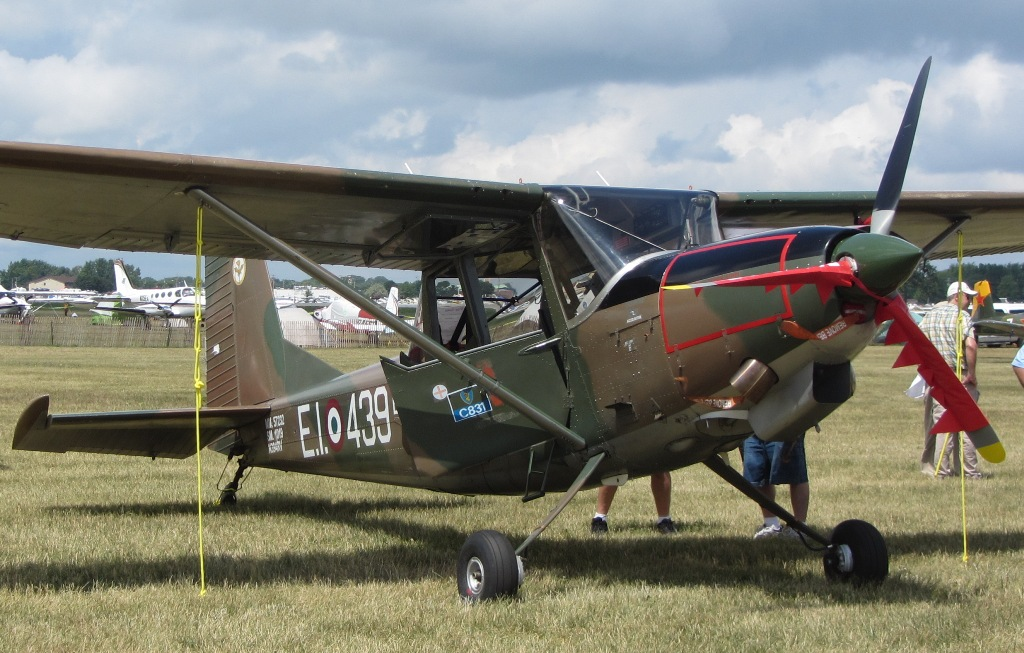
SIAI-Marchetti SM.1019

To meet an Italian Army requirement for a short take-off liaison aircraft, SIAI-Marchetti modified the design of the Cessna 305A/O-1 Bird Dog with a new turboprop engine and a revised tail unit. The prototype first flew on 24 May 1969 powered by a 317 hp (236 kW) Allison 250-B15C turboprop engine. It was evaluated against the Aermacchi AM.3 and was successful and won a production order for 80 aircraft.

== Variants ==
SM.1019
Prototype with 317hp (236kW) Allison 250-B15C turboprop engine, one built
SM.1019A
Production with 317hp (236kW) Allison 250-B15G 400hp turboprop engine derated to 317hp, 81 built
SM.1019B
Production variant with 400hp (298kW) Allison 250-B17B turboprop engine, designated SM.1019E.I by the Italian Army, four built

== Operators ==
Italy

- Italian Army

Somalia

- Somali Air Force – 6 in 1981, all retired.

== Accidents and incidents ==
On 24 July 2021, former US Navy F-14 pilot Dale "Snort" Snodgrass fatally crashed in an SM.1019B with the registration N28U at Lewiston–Nez Perce County Airport in Lewiston, Idaho. The probable cause of the accident was, according to the NTSB report, failure to remove the flight control lock, which immobilized flight control surfaces.

== Specifications (SM.1019A) ==
Data from Jane's All The World's Aircraft 1976–77

General characteristics

- Crew: 2
- Length: 8.52 m (27 ft 11 in)
- Wingspan: 10.972 m (36 ft 0 in)
- Height: 2.86 m (9 ft 5 in)
- Wing area: 16.16 m^{2} (173.9 sq ft)
- Aspect ratio: 7.44:1
- Airfoil: NACA 2412
- Empty weight: 690 kg (1,521 lb)
- Gross weight: 1,300 kg (2,866 lb)
- Max takeoff weight: 1,450 kg (3,197 lb)
- Fuel capacity: 320 L (85 US gal; 70 imp gal) in four wing tanks; Oil capacity 8 L (2.1 US gal; 1.8 imp gal)
- Powerplant: 1 × Allison Model 250-B17B turboprop engine, 298 kW (400 hp)
- Propellers: 3-bladed Hartzell HC-B3TF-7/T10173-11R constant-speed reversible pitch metal propeller

Performance

- Cruise speed: 296 km/h (184 mph, 160 kn) max at sea level

300 km/h (190 mph; 160 kn) max cruise speed at 2,500 m (8,200 ft)
281 km/h (175 mph; 152 kn) 75% power cruise speed at 2,500 m (8,200 ft)

- Stall speed: 98 km/h (61 mph, 53 kn) flaps up

70 km/h (43 mph; 38 kn) flaps extended

- Never exceed speed: 313 km/h (194 mph, 169 kn)
- Range: 925 km (575 mi, 499 nmi) at sea level

1,090 km (680 mi; 590 nmi)

- Endurance: 5 hours 45 minutes at sea level; 6 hours 40 minutes at 3,000 m (9,800 ft)
- Service ceiling: 7,620 m (25,000 ft)
- Rate of climb: 9.1833 m/s (1,807.74 ft/min)
- Wing loading: 80.4 kg/m^{2} (16.5 lb/sq ft) at 1,300 kg (2,900 lb) AUW; 89.7 kg/m^{2} (18.4 lb/sq ft) maximum
- Power/mass: 4.36 kg/kW (7.17 lb/hp) at 1,300 kg (2,900 lb) AUW; 4.87 kg/kW (8.01 lb/hp)
- Take-off run: 112 m (367 ft)
- Landing run: 91.5 m (300 ft)
- Take-off run to 15 m (49 ft): 220 m (720 ft)
- Landing run from 15 m (49 ft): 220 m (720 ft)

== See also ==
Related development

- Cessna O-1 Bird Dog

Aircraft of comparable role, configuration, and era

- Aermacchi AM.3
- UTVA-66
