= Utva Aviation Industry =

Serbian aircraft manufacturer

Coordinates: 44°53′53″N 20°37′59.9″E

- Native name: Утва Авио Индустрија; Utva Avio Industrija
- Type: Subsidiary
- Industry: Aerospace
- Founded: 5 June 1937; 89 years ago
- Headquarters: Pančevo, Serbia
- Owner: Yugoimport–SDPR (95.9%)
- Parent: Yugoimport–SDPR
- Website: utva-avio.com
- Footnotes; Business ID: 08061203; Tax ID: 101817221

Utva Aviation Industry (Serbian: Утва Авио Индустрија, romanized: Utva Avio Industrija), commonly known as UTVA (Note: In Serbian, Utva means common shelduck.) is a Serbian manufacturer of general aviation aircraft and unmanned aerial vehicles headquartered in Pančevo. It is a subsidiary of Yugoimport–SDPR.

== History ==
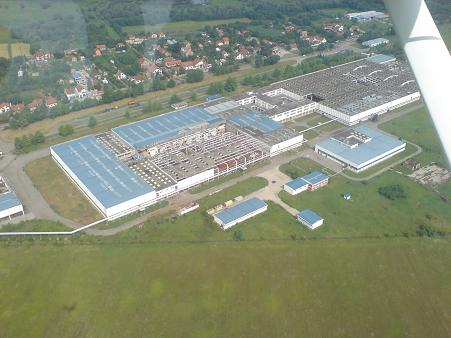
The Utva plant in Pančevo

Utva was established in Zemun on 5 June 1937. It initially produced simple gliders. In 1939, Utva expanded its production to include light piston engine aircraft. Since 1940, it has been headquartered in Pančevo. The factory sustained significant damage during the NATO bombing of Yugoslavia in 1999.

In 2017, the Serbian defence conglomerate Yugoimport–SDPR became its majority owner with a 96 percent stake.

== Products ==
=== Aircraft ===
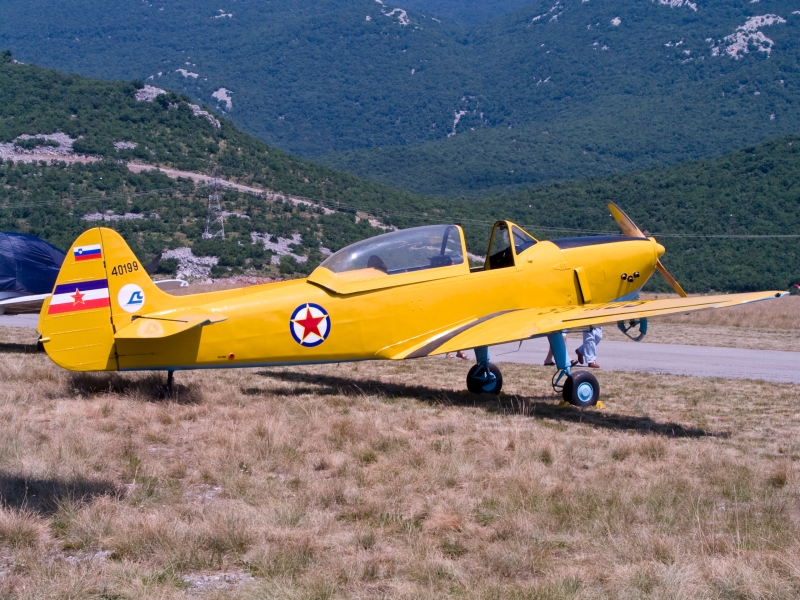
Utva Aero 3

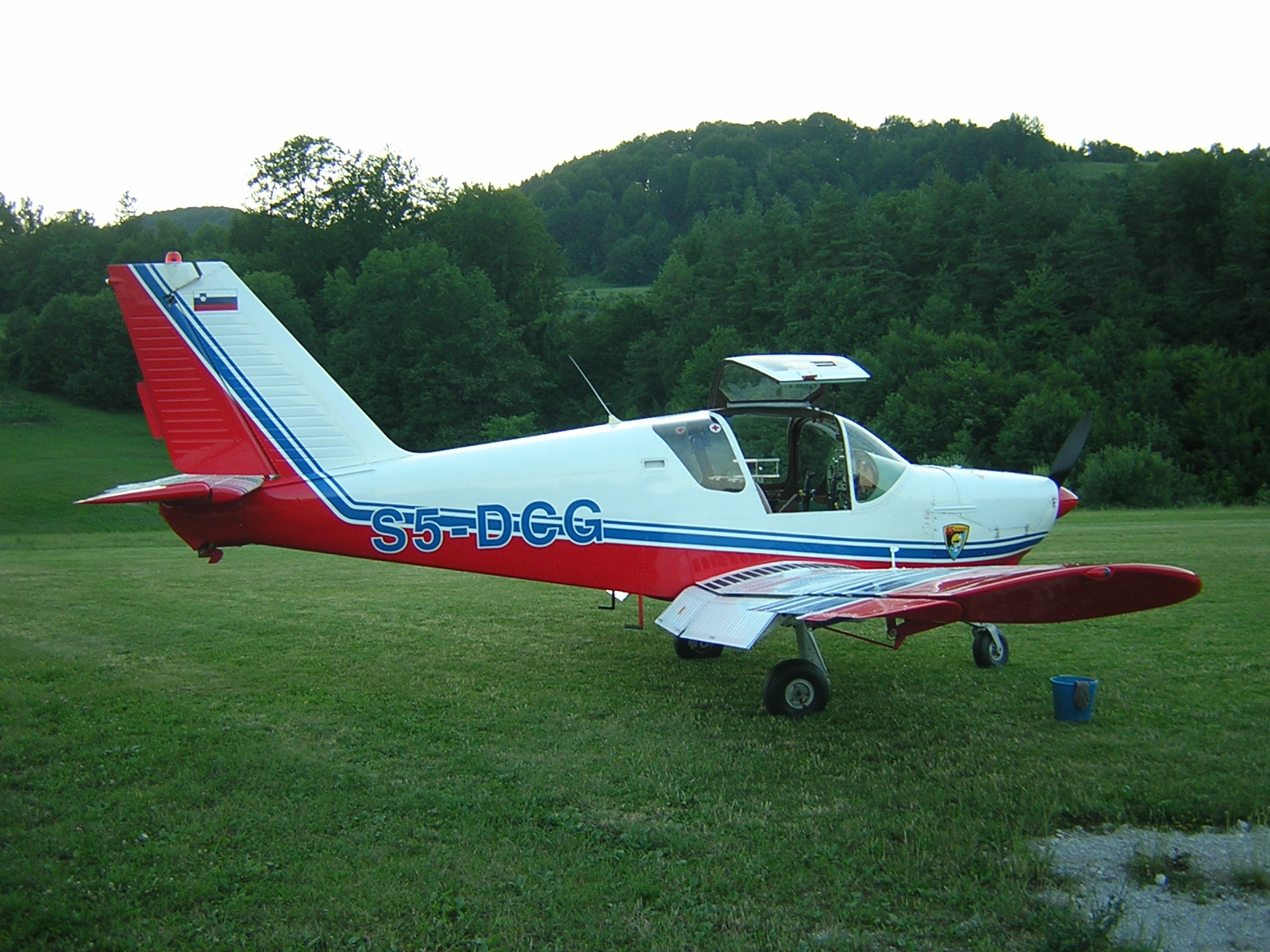
Utva 75

Model name	First flight	Number built	Type
Utva Bü 131 Jungmann		98	Single piston engine biplane trainer
Utva 212		~59 (Note: 1 prototype aircraft was built by Ikarus.)	Single piston engine monoplane trainer
Utva 213 Vihor		196	Single piston engine monoplane trainer
Utva Aero 3	1956	110	Single piston engine monoplane trainer
Utva Trojka	1946	79 (Note: 1 prototype aircraft was built by Ikarus.)	Single piston engine monoplane trainer
Utva 56	1959		Single piston engine monoplane utility airplane
Utva 60			Single piston engine monoplane utility airplane
Utva 65	1965	69	Single piston engine monoplane agricultural airplane
Utva 66	1966	130	Single piston engine monoplane utility airplane
Utva 75	1976	136	Single piston engine monoplane trainer
Utva Lasta 95	2009	37	Single piston engine monoplane trainer
Utva Kobac		1	Single turboprop engine monoplane trainer

=== Gliders ===
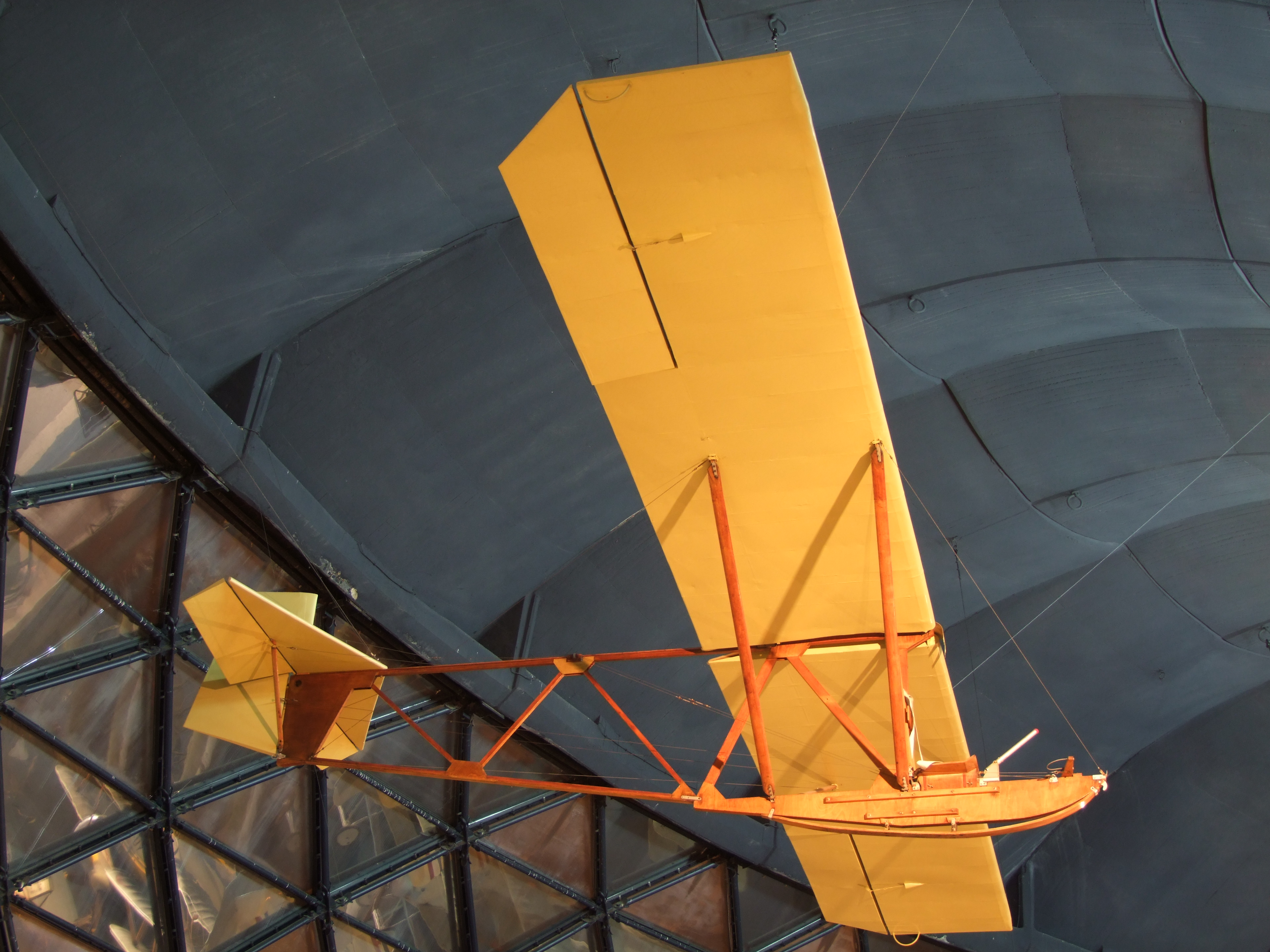
Vrabac A

Model name	First flight	Number built	Type
Utva M/J1	1939	1	Glider
Utva Meva		1	License built glider
Utva Salamandra			License built glider
Utva ŠH.1 Sraka			Glider
Utva Vrabac		150+	Glider
Utva Ševa			Glider
Utva Čavka			Glider
Utva Orlik		8	License built glider
Utva Delfin			License built glider
Utva Jastreb			Glider
Utva Soko	1947	1	Glider
Utva Ždral			License built glider
Utva Vaja			License built glider
Utva Lasta	1955	1	Glider

=== Unmanned aerial vehicles ===
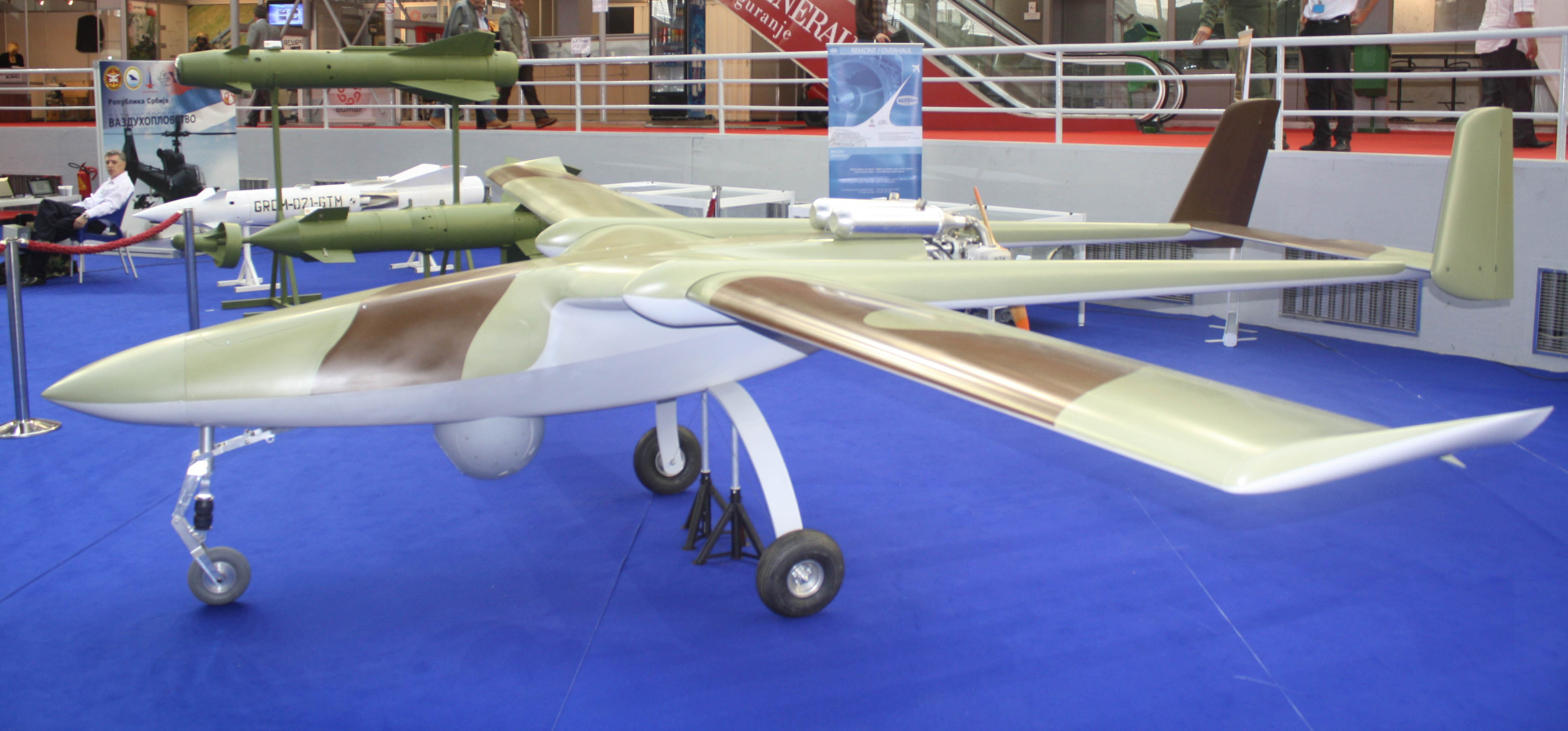
Pegaz

Model name	First flight	Number built	Type
Pegaz	2011	12+	Combat
Vrabac	2008	50+	Reconnaissance
Gavran 145	2022		Loitering
Osica	2023		Loitering

== See also ==
- Aero East Europe Sila
- Aircraft industry of Serbia
- Defense industry of Serbia
