= Utva Lasta =

Serbian military aircraft

Lasta 95
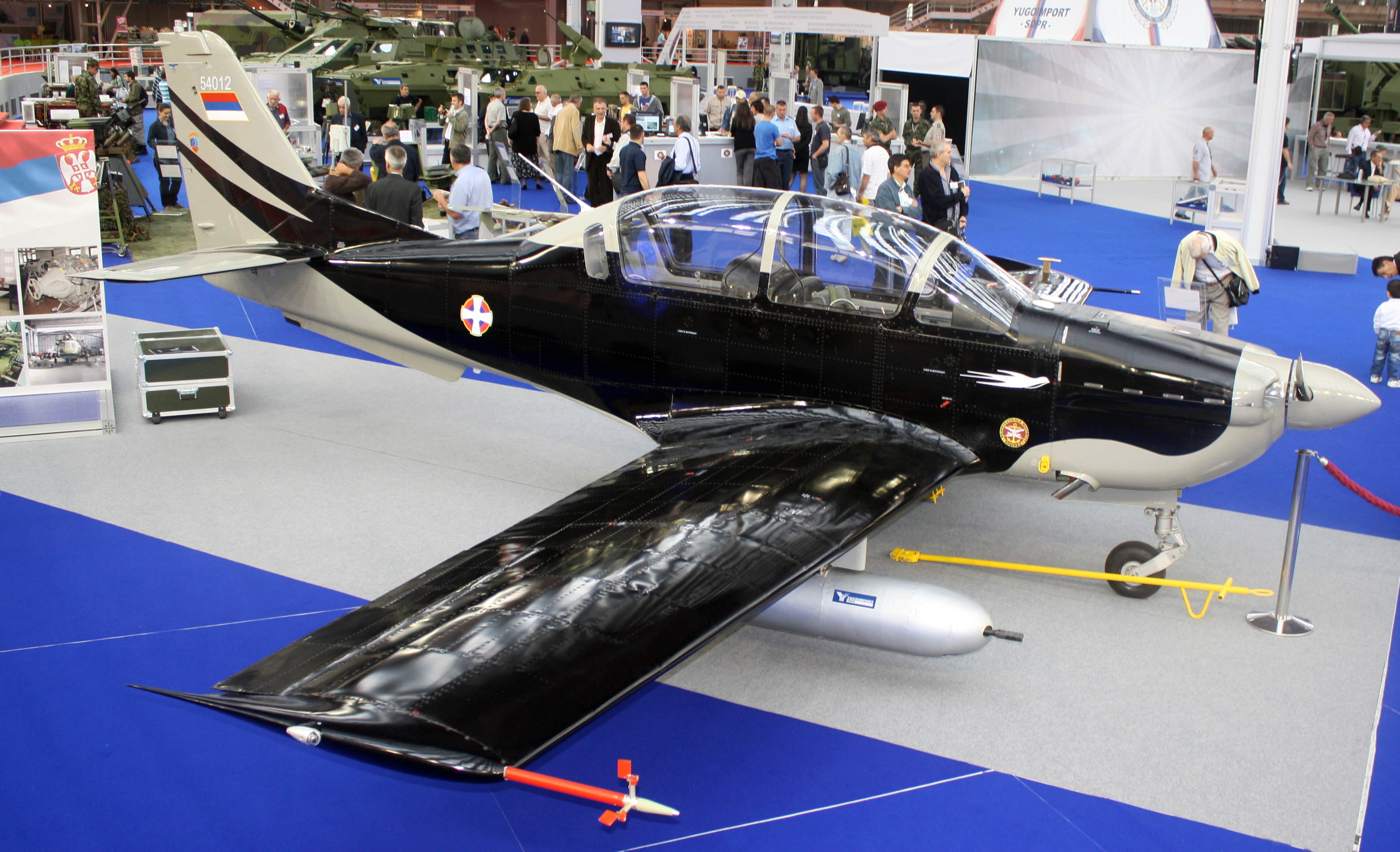
- Lasta 95 P2

General information
- Type: Trainer aircraft
- Manufacturer: Utva Aviation Industry
- Designer: Military Technical Institute
- Status: In service
- Primary users: Serbian Air Force Iraqi Air Force
- Number built: 37

History
- Introduction date: 2010
- First flight: Lasta 1 prototype: 2 September 1985; Lasta 95: 26 February 2009

The Utva Lasta 95 (from Serbian: утва, lit. 'shelduck', and ласта, lit. 'barn swallow') is a Serbian light military trainer aircraft produced by Utva Aviation Industry, a subsidiary of Yugoimport SDPR. It is a tandem two-seater low-wing trainer with a metal airframe. The aircraft is capable of basic training functions including aerobatics, instrument and tactical flying, as well as basic training in use of weapons. The first prototype of Lasta 1 flew on 2 September 1985, while the first prototype of the current version, Lasta 3, flew on 26 February 2009.

== Design and development ==
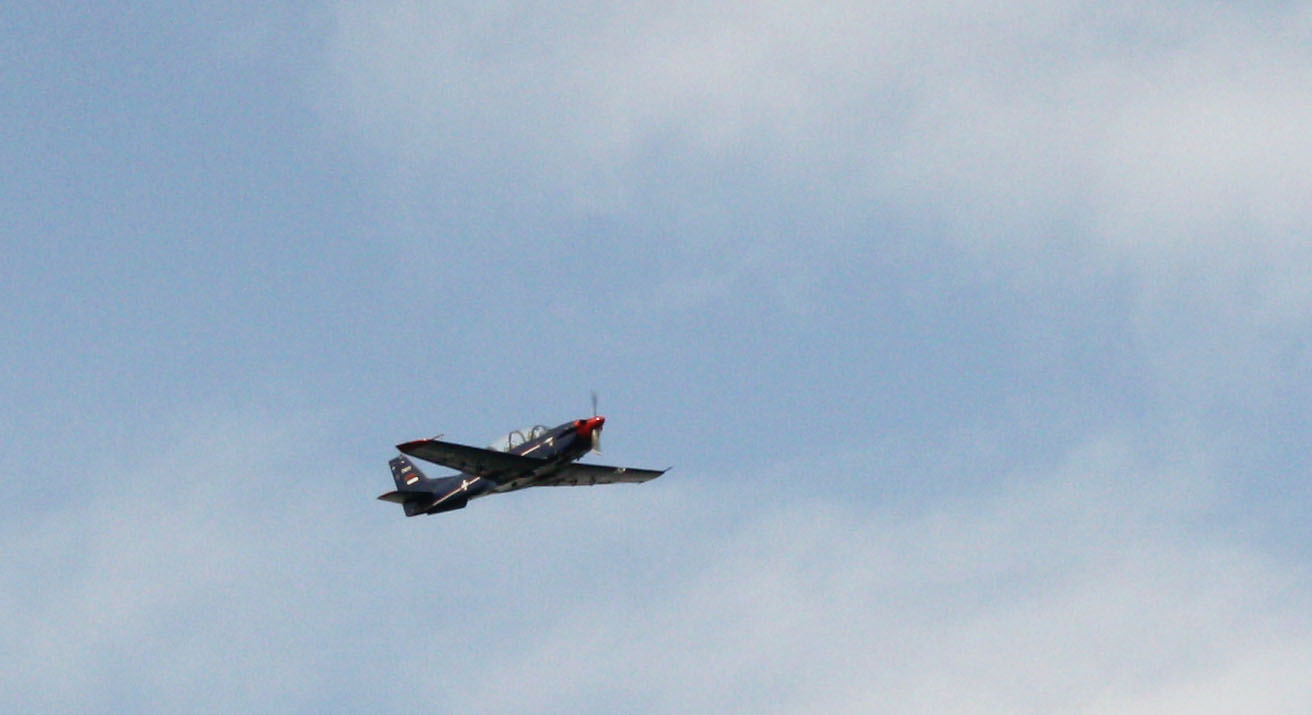
Lasta 95

The Lasta was originally developed to be a replacement of the Utva 75 and, partially, the Soko G-2 Galeb, which had been the most commonly used trainer of the Yugoslav Air Force until the breakup of Yugoslavia. The first prototype, Lasta 1, was completed by the spring of 1985. After the initial testing phase, it achieved its first flight on 2 September 1985. In January 1989, design began on a modified version, Lasta 2, following changes in the Yugoslav Air Force's requirements. Lasta 2 was lighter, with a shorter fuselage and a new electronics suite, including a Ferranti ISIS D-282 fire control system. By the early 1990s, Utva and her partners had produced enough parts for the completion of 10 pre-production airframes. During the 1999 NATO bombing of Yugoslavia, all five existing prototypes were destroyed in the bombing of Utva Aviation Industry. A sixth prototype survived with damage and was donated to the Aviation Museum in Belgrade.

Development of the Lasta was restarted in 2006. The new version was known as the Lasta 95 and followed the basic concepts of Lasta 2, with updates due to newer available technology. In 2009, it was announced that Iraq would purchase 20 of these trainer aircraft.

With its specifications and updated avionics, the aircraft will ensure full pilot training for all elements of airplane application including:

- basic flying,
- aerobatics,
- navigation flying,
- basic elements of night flying,
- category II instrumental flight,
- basic elements of gunning, rocketing and bombing (GRB)
- Light close air support of counterinsurgency operations and area patrol / light attack missions

=== Future improvements and developments ===
It is possible to install ejection seats, but with higher cost and weight of the airplane. It is also possible that new containers with armaments and sensors would be developed for Lasta 95, as well as a proposed turboprop version of the aircraft with more advanced training and combat capabilities.

== Operational history ==
In 2007, the Iraqi Air Force ordered 20 aircraft, with an option for 16 more. The first Lasta 95s were transferred to Iraq in 2010. Last of the 20 ordered Lasta 95 aircraft arrived in 2012. According to media reports, the aircraft have been used during the Iraqi war against ISIL.

By 2017, 14 Lasta 95 aircraft that the Serbian Air Force and Air Defence had ordered entered into service.

== Variants ==
There are three-factory versions of Lasta 95.

=== Lasta 95N ===
This light piston-propeller training aircraft is primarily intended for initial and basic training of military pilots. With in-line tandem seating, the trainer was developed in accordance with the Federal Aviation Regulations (Joint Aviation Requirements) 23 regulations for aerobatic category of airplanes and it provides an easy transition to Kobac and then to jet at higher training levels. The LASTA is equipped with a six-cylinder Lycoming engine AEIO-580-B1A 232 kW (315 HP) of the opposed-cylinder type, and a two-bladed metal propeller Hartzell HC-C2YR-4CF/FC 8475-6, which provides maximum flight velocity (at an altitude of 3,000m and a takeoff weight of 1,085 kg) of 345 km/h. The empty weight is 888 kg, and the maximum takeoff weight is 1,210 kg for the aerobatic category and 1,450 kg for the utility (armed) category. The total aircraft length is 7.97m. The trapezoidal wings have a wingspan of 9.7 m and a surface of 12.9 m^{2}. The altitude barrier of flight is 6,000 m. This propeller-driven low-wing aircraft has a tricycle retractable landing gear suitable for rough-field operations. Onboard GPS and Instrument Landing System (ILS) support the operations during CAT-II weather conditions. The aircraft is equipped with Mode S transponder for flight identification. It can also be used for combat fire training, rocket firing and bombing. The armed version of the Lasta 95 can be equipped with 7.62×54mmR or 12.7 × 108 mm machine guns, 57 mm rocket launchers or bombs weighing up to 120 kg on two hardpoints.

=== Lasta 95V-54 ===
Lasta 95V-54 designation is for Serbian Air Force and Air Defence. Differences between Lasta 95N and Lats 95V-54 are in following:

- Two-blade metal propeller HARTZELL HC-C2YR-4CF/FC 8475-8
- New propeller cap
- Modified primary flight controls
- Modified engine controls with less friction
- New instruments for measuring temperatures and oil pressure and temperatures of cylinder block and exhaust gases in both cabins
- New radio stations Bendix/King for UHF with antennas
- New gun sight AKN-09 Teleoptik Zemun which supports containers with Machine gun, bombs and unguided rocket launcher
- Two under-wing hard points for weapons max allowed 120 kg
- New glass cockpit with Garmin G500 avionics suites, which includes a primary flight display (PFD) and a multi-function display (MFD). The aircraft also integrates an instrumental flying simulation system.
- Introduction of new composites materials in some parts of the plane

=== Lasta 95P-2 ===
This is the same version as the Lasta 95V-54 designated for export customers with possibility of slight differences at customer request.

== Operators ==
=== Current operators ===
- Iraq: Iraqi Air Force – 20 Lasta 95N (option for another 16)
- Serbia: Serbian Air Force – 14 Lasta 95V-54

=== Potential operators ===
Several countries are rumored to have expressed interest in acquiring the aircraft:

- Algeria: Algerian Air Force
- Angola: National Air Force of Angola
- Libya: Libyan Air Force

== Specifications (Lasta 95N) ==
Data from Military Technical Institute

General characteristics

- Crew: 2
- Length: 7.965 m (26 ft 2 in)
- Wingspan: 9.7 m (31 ft 10 in)
- Height: 2.84 m (9 ft 4 in)
- Wing area: 12.9 m^{2} (139 sq ft)
- Aspect ratio: 6.3
- Empty weight: 888 kg (1,958 lb)
- Gross weight: 1,145 kg (2,524 lb)
- Max takeoff weight: 1,210 kg (2,668 lb) unarmed
- Powerplant: 1 × Lycoming AEIO-580-B1A 6-cyl. air-cooled horizontally-opposed piston engine, 232 kW (311 hp)
- Propellers: 2-bladed HARTZELL HC-C2YR-4CF/FC 8475-8 constant speed propeller, 1.98 m (6 ft 6 in) diameter

Performance

- Maximum speed: 345 km/h (214 mph, 186 kn)
- Cruise speed: 280 km/h (170 mph, 150 kn)
- Stall speed: 95 km/h (59 mph, 51 kn)
- Never exceed speed: 425 km/h (264 mph, 229 kn)
- Range: 1,160 km (720 mi, 630 nmi)
- Ferry range: 1,160 km (720 mi, 630 nmi)
- Service ceiling: 6,000 m (20,000 ft)
- g limits: +6 -3 g
- Rate of climb: 8.5 m/s (1,670 ft/min)

Armament

- Hardpoints: 2 with a capacity of 100 kg (220 lb) bombs, 7.62 mm (0.300 in) or 12.7 mm (0.500 in) calibre machine-gun pods or 57 mm (2.244 in) rocket pods (7 rockets each)

== See also ==
Related development

- Kobac, turboprop trainer and counter-insurgency aircraft.

Aircraft of comparable role, configuration, and era

- ENAER T-35 Pillán
- Socata TB 30 Epsilon
