= Utva-65 =

Type of aircraft

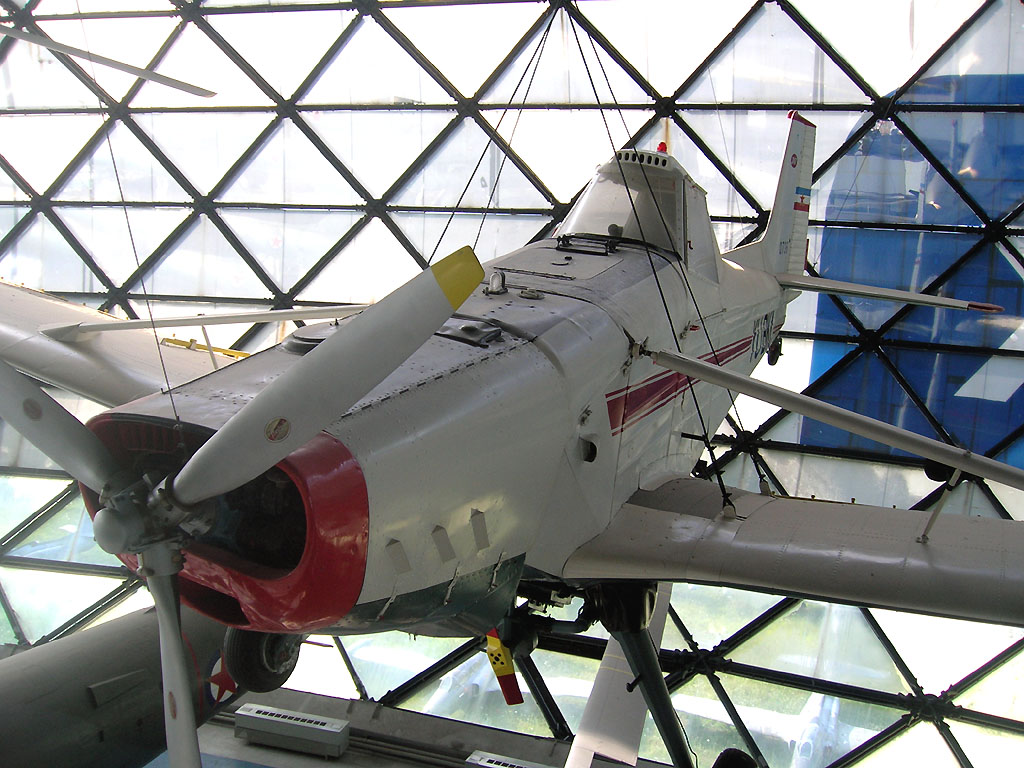
- Utva-65-S in the aviation museum in Belgrade

General information
- Type: Agricultural aircraft
- Manufacturer: Fabrika Aviona Utva
- Designer: B. Nikolic, M. Dabinovic and S. Cotič
- Status: Retired
- Number built: 69

History
- First flight: 1965

The Utva-65 Privrednik (Merchant) is a Yugoslav civil aircraft designed and used for agricultural work.

== Design and development ==
The Utva-65 was designed specifically as an agricultural aircraft. It was a single-seat, low-wing braced monoplane with a single engine. The wings were essentially identical to those of the high-wing UTVA-60 apart from the wing roots, which were extended and strengthened so that the chord was greater and the wingspan increased by 0.82 metres (2.7 ft) These wings were of single-spar, all-metal construction, carrying ailerons that linked to the flaps, drooping 15 degrees when the flaps were set to 40 degrees. A single streamlined strut ran from the upper fuselage to mid-wing on either side, with minor struts from them to the wing at about one-quarter span. The conventional all-metal tail surfaces were also from the UTVA-60, but had increased elevator area.

The fuselage of the Utva-65 had a steel-tube structure, with metal skinning forward and below and fabric elsewhere. The single-seat pilot's cockpit was high and behind the trailing edge; combined with all-round glazing, this gave a good view and also increased fuselage space. There was a 0.75-cubic-meter (26 cu ft) hopper for fertilizer, spray, etc. ahead of the cockpit. Standard spray bars could be fitted under the trailing edge. The undercarriage was of the conventional tailwheel kind, with cantilever main legs angling outwards from the wing root.

At launch there were three choices of engine, all Lycoming six-cylinder horizontally-opposed air-cooled types. The GO-480-B1A6 produced 270 hp (200 kW), the geared GO-480-G1A6 290 hp (216 kW), and the IGO-540-B1A 350 hp (260 kW). A later variant of the Utva-65, the Utva-67 (first flown in 1967), was similar, but had the eight-cylinder, 400‑hp (298 kW) Lycoming IO-720-A1A and a revised fuselage of greater capacity. Its top speed was 295 km/h (183 mph).

== Operational history ==
The Utva-65 was used in Yugoslavia by agricultural cooperatives for pesticide application and mosquito control. The Algerian airline Societé de Travail Aérien began operations in October 1968 using five Utva-65 aircraft for similar work.

== Variants ==
Utva-65 Privrednik-GO
Variant with a 295 hp (220 kW) Lycoming GO-480-G1A6.
Utva-65 Privrednik-IO
Alternate variant with a 300 hp (224 kW) Lycoming IO-540-K1A5.
Utva-65 Super Privrednik-350
1973 variant with a 350 hp (261 kW) Lycoming IO-540-A1C engine.

== Operators ==
Algeria
Yugoslavia

== Aircraft on display ==
Serbia

- Museum of Aviation (Belgrade) in Belgrade

A Utva-65 S is on display.

== Specifications (Lycoming IGO-540-B1A) ==
Data from Jane's 1966–7 p.367

General characteristics

- Crew: 1
- Length: 8.46 m (27 ft 9 in)
- Wingspan: 12.22 m (40 ft 1 in)
- Height: 2.60 m (8 ft 6.5 in)
- Wing area: 19.4 m^{2} (209 sq ft)
- Empty weight: 700 kg (1,543 lb)
- Gross weight: 1,890 kg (4,165 lb)
- Powerplant: 1 × Lycoming IGO-540-B1A six-cylinder horizontally-opposed , 260 kW (350 hp)

Performance

- Maximum speed: 234 km/h (145 mph, 126 kn)
- Cruise speed: 192 km/h (119 mph, 103 kn)
- Stall speed: 76 km/h (47 mph, 41 kn)
- Range: 620 km (385 mi, 335 nmi) with 185 L fuel

== See also ==
Aircraft of comparable role, configuration, and era

- Piper Pawnee
- Cessna 188
