= UTVA-60 =

General information
- Type: Light utility/training aircraft
- National origin: Yugoslavia
- Manufacturer: UTVA

History
- Introduction date: 1960
- First flight: 22 April 1959 (UTVA-56)
- Variants: UTVA 65; UTVA 66

The UTVA-60 is a Yugoslavian light aircraft of the 1960s. First flying in 1959, it was built by UTVA for both the Yugoslavian armed forces and for civilian use.

== Development and design ==
In 1959 the Yugoslav aircraft company UTVA designed and built a single-engined, high-winged light utility aircraft, the UTVA 56, with a prototype making the first flight on 22 April 1959. Testing was successful, but the aircraft was redesigned for production, with a more powerful Lycoming O-480 engine, and designated the UTVA-60.

The UTVA-60 is an all-metal, four-place, strut-braced high-wing monoplane. It is fitted with a fixed conventional undercarriage which uses cantilevered steel tube struts. Trailing-edge wing flaps are linked to the ailerons, drooping the ailerons when the flaps are lowered to reduce landing speed, while the agricultural version's wing was fitted with slots.

The UTVA-60 was used as the basis for the UTVA-65, a specialised agricultural aircraft, which used the wings, undercarriage and tail of the UTVA-60, but with a low-mounted wing. The UTVA-60 was replaced in production by the UTVA-66, a further improved version.

== Operational history ==
As well as civil use, the UTVA-60 was used by the Yugoslav Air Force, who received about 35, using them until 1982, while Cambodia received four aircraft.

== Variants ==
UTVA-56
Prototype, powered by a 194 kW (260 hp) Lycoming GO-435 engine.
UTVA-60-AT1
Basic four seat utility version.
UTVA-60-AT2
Dual control version.
UTVA-60-AG
Agricultural version.
UTVA-60-AM
Ambulance version.
UTVA-60H
Floatplane, powered by a 221 kW (296 kW) Lycoming GO-480-G1H6 engine.

== Operators ==
Cambodia

- Royal Cambodian Air Force

Croatia

- Croatian Air Force

Khmer Republic

- Khmer Air Force

Republika Srpska

- Republika Srpska Air Force
  - 92nd Light Multi role Aircraft Squadron

Yugoslavia

- Yugoslav Air Force
  - 122nd Hydroplane Liaison Squadron (1964–1968)
- Letalski center Maribor (civil operator) YU-CBA, accident 20.06.1982

== Specifications (UTVA-60-AT1) ==
Data from

General characteristics

- Crew: 1
- Capacity:
  - 3 passengers or
  - 2 stretchers and attendant
- Length: 8.22 m (27 ft 0 in)
- Wingspan: 11.40 m (37 ft 5 in)
- Height: 2.72 m (8 ft 11 in)
- Wing area: 18.08 m^{2} (194.6 sq ft)
- Aspect ratio: 7.19
- Airfoil: NACA 4412 (modified)
- Empty weight: 952 kg (2,099 lb)
- Max takeoff weight: 1,620 kg (3,571 lb)
- Powerplant: 1 × Lycoming O-480-G1H6 air-cooled flat-six, 200 kW (270 hp)
- Propellers: 2-bladed Hartzell HC-A2X20-1B/10133-3 constant speed metal propeller

Performance

- Maximum speed: 252 km/h (157 mph, 136 kn) at sea level
- Cruise speed: 230 km/h (140 mph, 120 kn)
- Stall speed: 73 km/h (45 mph, 39 kn)
- Never exceed speed: 300 km/h (190 mph, 160 kn)
- Range: 780 km (480 mi, 420 nmi)
- Service ceiling: 5,200 m (17,100 ft)
- Rate of climb: 6.4 m/s (1,260 ft/min)

== See also ==
Related development

- UTVA 65
- UTVA 66
