= Aermacchi AM.3 =

Italian observation/utility aircraft

AM.3
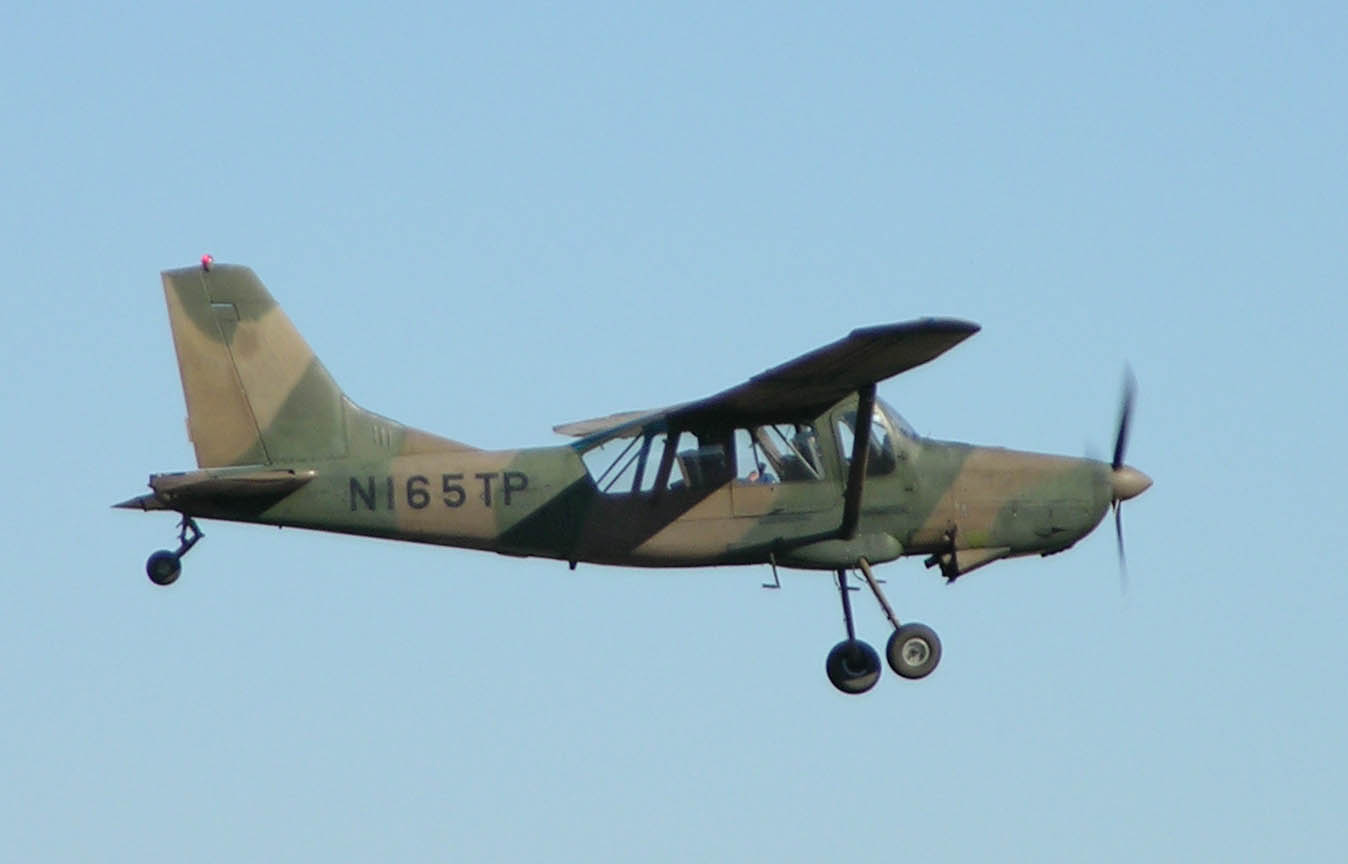
- AM.3CM Bosbok operated by the National Test Pilot School at the Mojave Spaceport

General information
- Type: Observation aircraft
- Manufacturer: Aermacchi
- Primary users: South African Air Force Rwanda

History
- Introduction date: 1973
- First flight: 12 May 1967
- Retired: 1992

The Aermacchi AM.3 was the result of a joint venture between Aermacchi and Aeritalia (then Aerfer Industrie Aerospaziali Meridionali) in response to an Italian Army requirement for an aircraft to replace the Cessna L-19, and was initially designated the MB-335.

== Design and development ==
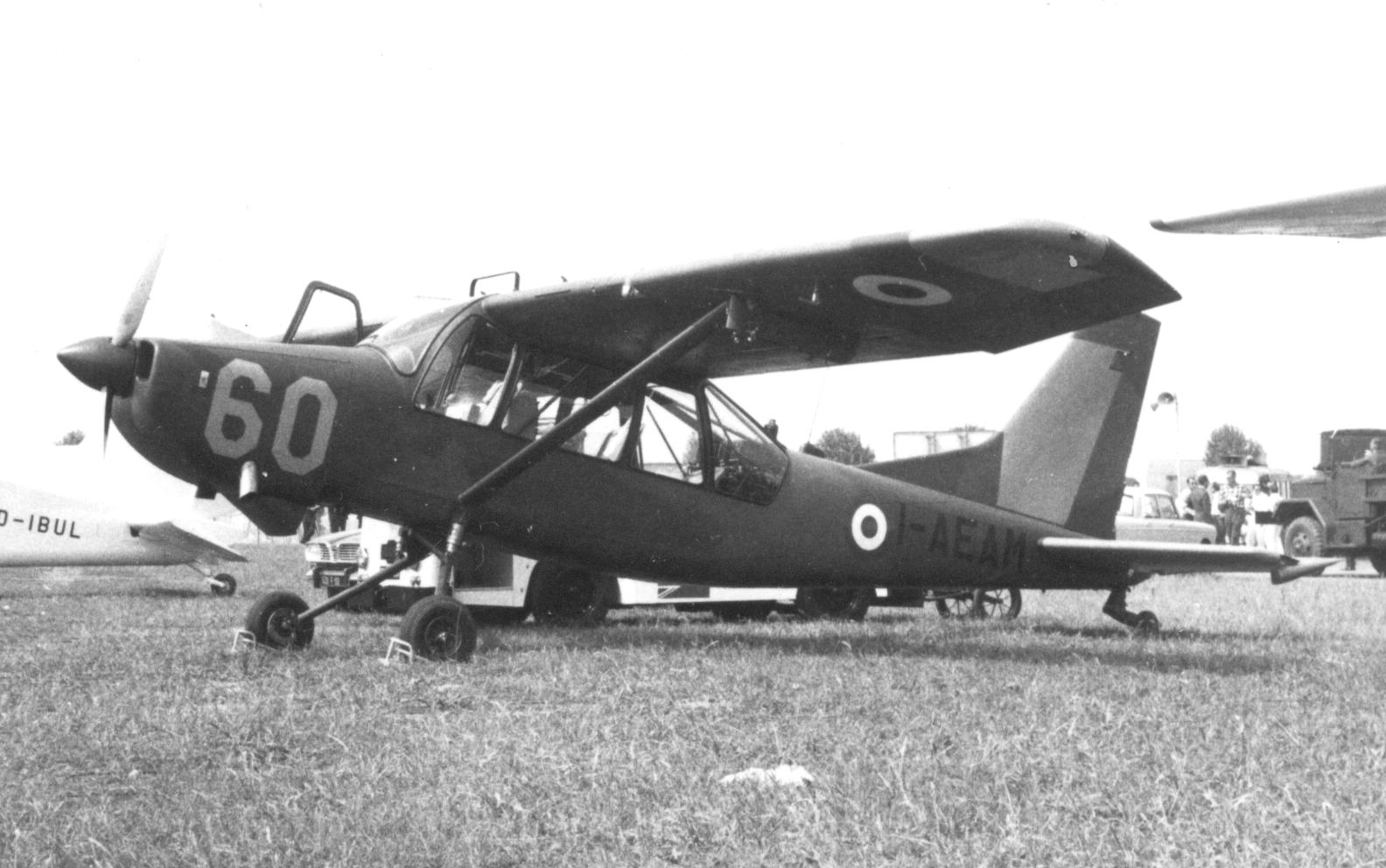
The AM 3 prototype displayed at the Paris Air Salon in June 1967

The AM.3 used the wing design of the Aermacchi AL-60 utility aircraft, strengthened to incorporate two hardpoints. The fuselage was a new design.

The first prototype, constructed by Aermacchi, flew on 12 May 1967, and it was displayed at the Paris air show in June that year. The second prototype, constructed by AERFER, flew on 22 August 1968, but the aircraft lost the Italian Army contract to the SIAI Marchetti SM.1019. Nevertheless, Aeritalia continued development.

The third prototype used a more powerful Piaggio-built Lycoming GSO-480-B1B6 in place of the original Continental GTSIO-520-C, and this variant was designated AM.3C

Pilot and observer are accommodated in tandem positions, and the craft features dual controls. Aft space is utilitarian, providing space for two stretchers or seat space for additional passengers. Additional configurations include freight transport.

Armament configurations are diverse, as well. Two standard underwing pylons were able to carry 170 kg (375 lb) of stores each. Typical armament includes machine guns, rockets, bombs and missiles. Reconnaissance packs could be fitted to, or inside of, the fuselage. Additional pylons were often added by customers.

== Bosbok ==
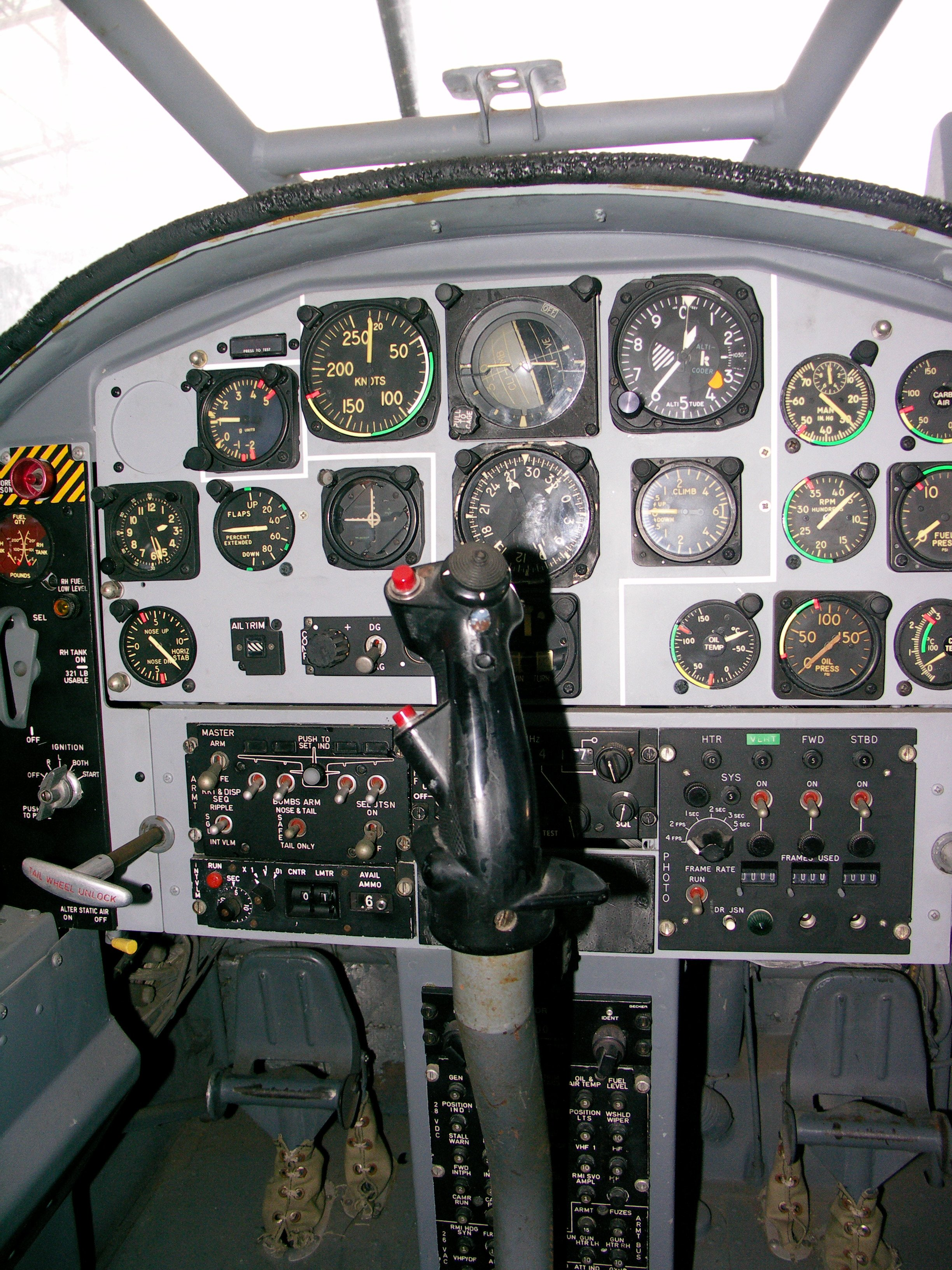
Bosbok cockpit

In September 1970, the South African Air Force ordered 40 AM.3Cs, designating the aircraft the AM.3CM Bosbok (Bush-buck). The first aircraft was taken on charge in March 1973, with deliveries continuing until December 1975, equipping 41 Squadron and 42 Squadron.

The Bosbok saw extensive action during the South African military operations in Angola between 1975 and 1989, during which it wore an olive-drab/dark earth camouflage instead of the light-grey paint scheme in which it was delivered.

The SAAF's Bosboks had four underwing hardpoints from which a variety of ordnance could be hung, including machine-gun pods, light bombs, and smoke-rocket pods. Each of the two inner hardpoints was stressed for a 170 kg (375 lb) load, with the two outer points being stressed for a 91 kg (200 lb) load.

Roles performed by the Bosbok in SAAF service include:

- Forward air control
- Radio relay (referred to as "Telstar duty" by the SAAF)
- Target marking (using smoke-rockets)
- Reconnaissance/observation (including artillery spotting)
- Casevac
- Liaison

The Bosbok really excelled in the dangerous role of target-marking, in which it used this technique - the aircraft would approach the target at tree-top height, pull up to around 92 m (300 ft) when nearly overhead the target, line up the nose on the target, and release the rockets, before quickly turning away and diving back to tree-top level to avoid ground fire.

Using this method, a Bosbok was once credited with destroying an entire 37 mm anti-aircraft gun position with a lucky direct hit from one of its smoke marker rockets.

Following the end of South Africa's involvement in the Angolan War in 1989 and the subsequent downsizing of the SAAF, the Bosbok was retired from service in 1992.

== Operators ==
Italy

- Italian Army (20)

Rwanda

- Rwandan Air Force (3)

South Africa

- South African Air Force (40)
  - 41 Squadron SAAF
  - 42 Squadron SAAF

United States

- National Test Pilot School (1)

== Specifications (AM-3C) ==
Data from Jane's all the World's Aircraft 1971–72, Jane's all the World's Aircraft 1969–70

General characteristics

- Crew: 2, pilot and observer
- Length: 8.73 m (28 ft 8 in)
- Wingspan: 11.73 m (38 ft 6 in)
- Height: 2.72 m (8 ft 11 in)
- Wing area: 19.04 m^{2} (204.9 sq ft)
- Aspect ratio: 7.2:1
- Airfoil: root: NACA 23016; tip: NACA 4412
- Empty weight: 1,080 kg (2,381 lb)
- Max takeoff weight: 1,700 kg (3,748 lb) with under-wing weapons
- Powerplant: 1 × Piaggio-built Lycoming GSO-480-B1B6 6-cylinder, air-cooled, horizontally opposed piston engine, 250 kW (340 hp)
- Propellers: 3-bladed Piaggio P1033-G4-AD/0691/245 constant-speed propeller

Performance

- Maximum speed: 278 km/h (173 mph, 150 kn) at 2,440 m (8,010 ft)

260 km/h (160 mph; 140 kn) at sea level

- Cruise speed: 246 km/h (153 mph, 133 kn) at 2,440 m (8,010 ft)
- Range: 990 km (620 mi, 530 nmi) at 1,525 m (5,003 ft) with 30 minutes reserve
- Endurance: 5 hours 45 minutes at 1,525 m (5,003 ft) with 30 minutes reserve
- Service ceiling: 8,400 m (27,600 ft)
- Rate of climb: 7 m/s (1,400 ft/min)
- Wing loading: 89.3 kg/m^{2} (18.3 lb/sq ft)
- Power/mass: 6.69 kg/kW (11 lb/hp)
- Take-off run: 85 m (279 ft)
- Take-off run to 15 m (49 ft): 170 m (560 ft)
- Landing run: 66 m (217 ft)
- Landing run from 15 m (49 ft): 174 m (571 ft)

Armament

- Up to 2 machine gun pods
- Two 170 kg (370 lb) bombs, or four 91 kg (201 lb) bombs
- Up to 4 smoke-rocket pods
