= Soko SP RR =

SOKO SP RR
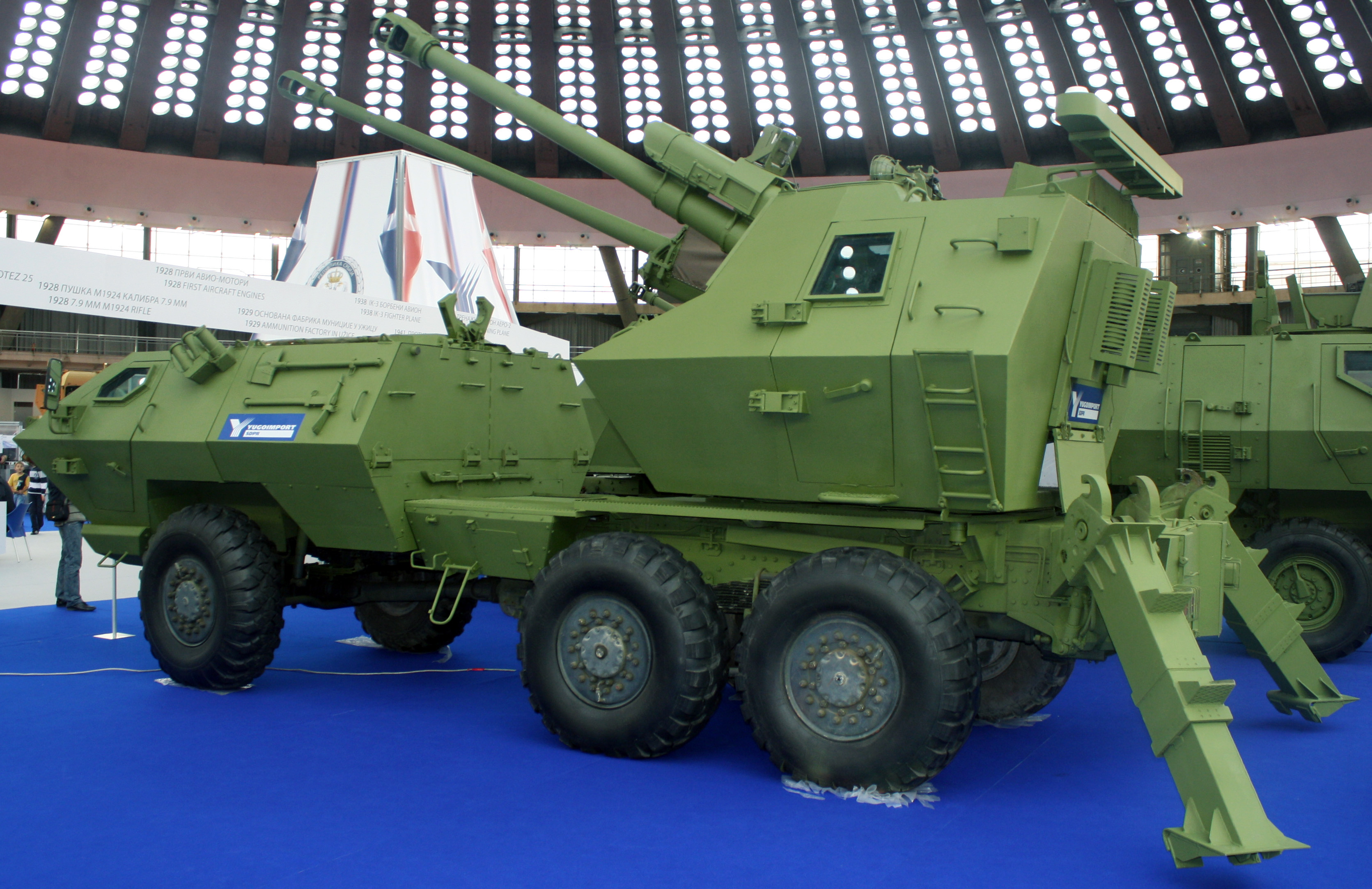
- SOKO SP RR 122mm howitzer on display at the PARTNER 2011 military fair
- Type: Self-propelled howitzer
- Place of origin: Serbia

Production history
- Manufacturer: Yugoimport

Specifications
- Mass: Combat: 17,000 kg (37,000 lb)
- Length: 8.38 m (27.5 ft)
- Width: 3.09 m (10.1 ft)
- Height: 3.17 m (10.4 ft)
- Caliber: 122 mm (4.8 in)
- Elevation: –7° to 65°
- Traverse: 70°
- Rate of fire: Maximum: 6 rpm Sustained: 4 rpm
- Effective firing range: 17.3 km (10.7 mi); 21.0 km (13.0 mi) (with rocket-assisted projectile)
- Main armament: 122mm 35 caliber D-30 J howitzer
- Secondary armament: 7.62mm machine gun
- Engine: DaimlerChrysler OM906 LA; 6.37 lit. 279 hp (208 kW)
- Operational range: 600 km (370 mi)
- Maximum speed: 100 km/h (62 mph)

SOKO SP RR (also known as, SOKO self-propelled rapid response) is a truck-mounted self-propelled howitzer developed by Serbian arms manufacturer Yugoimport. It is based on integration of 122 mm 35-calibre D-30 J howitzer with a six-wheel drive truck chassis. It has a firing range of 21 kilometres (13 mi), and rate of fire of 6 rounds per minute.

SOKO was unveiled during the SOFEX 2010 in Jordan.

== See also ==
- 122mm SORA
- 2S1 Gvozdika
