= 122 mm howitzer 2A18 (D-30) =

Soviet 122-mm towed artillery

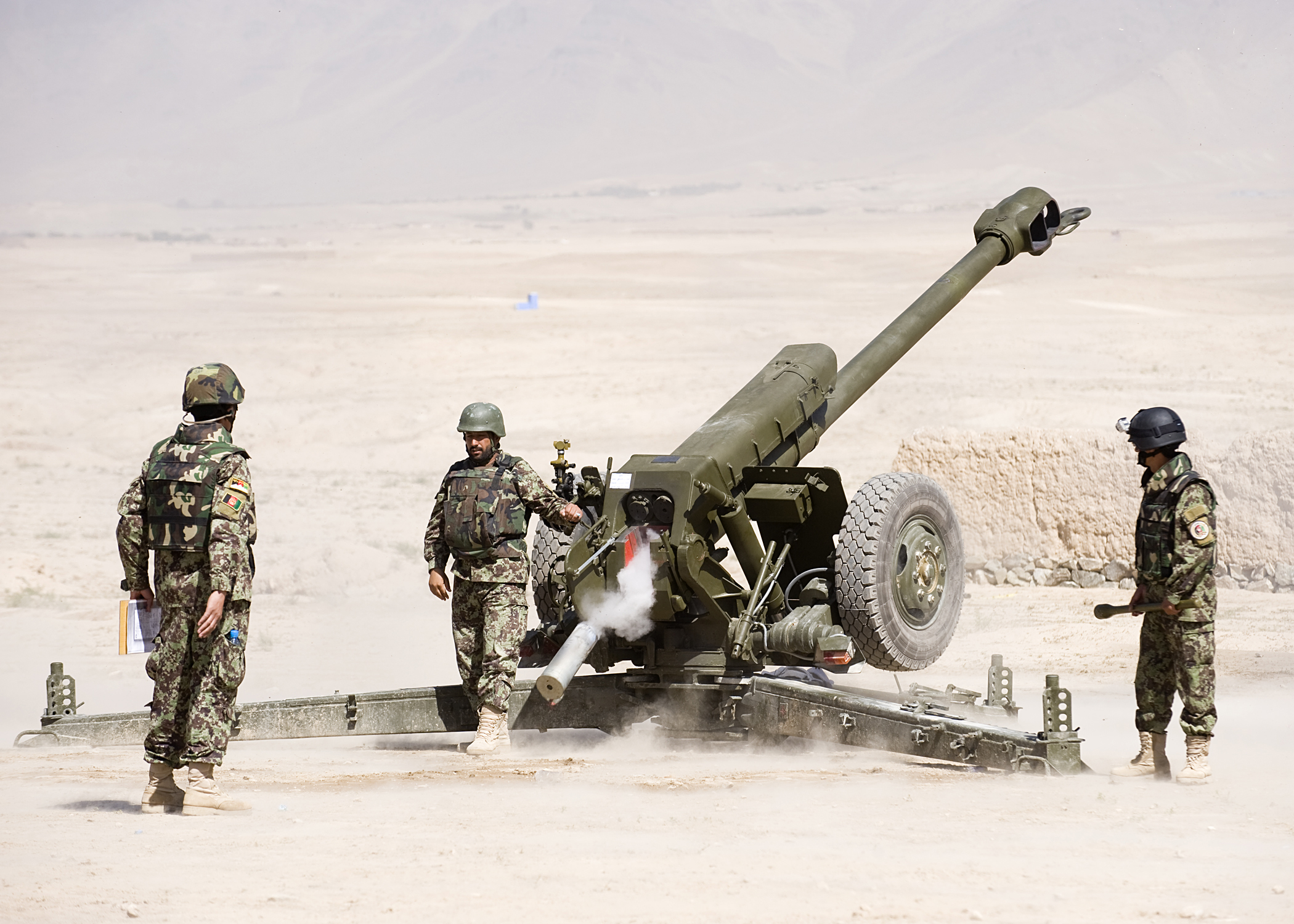
- D-30A in Afghan service
- Type: Howitzer
- Place of origin: Soviet Union

Service history
- In service: 1960–present
- Used by: see Operators
- Wars: Ethiopian Civil War; Lebanese Civil War; Angolan Civil War; Western Sahara War; Uganda–Tanzania War; Soviet–Afghan War; Iran–Iraq War; Gulf War; First Nagorno-Karabakh War; Somali Civil War; Yugoslav Wars; Eritrean-Ethiopian War; Second Congo War; Boko Haram insurgency; Syrian Civil War; War in Iraq (2013–2017); War in Donbas; Yemeni Civil War (2014–present); Second Nagorno-Karabakh War; Tigray War; Russo-Ukrainian War; War in Amhara; Myanmar Civil war

Production history
- Designer: F.F. Petrov
- Designed: 1950s
- Manufacturer: PJSC Plant No. 9
- Produced: 1960–present
- Variants: See variants

Specifications
- Mass: Combat: 3.21 t (3.16 long tons; 3.54 short tons)
- Length: Transport: 5.4 m (17 ft 9 in)
- Barrel length: 4.66 m (15 ft 3 in) L/38
- Width: Transport: 1.9 m (6 ft 3 in)
- Height: Transport: 1.6 m (5 ft 3 in)
- Crew: 1+7
- Shell: 122 x 447 mm R Separate loading charge and projectile
- Caliber: 122 mm (4.8 in)
- Breech: Semi-automatic vertical sliding-wedge
- Recoil: Hydro-pneumatic
- Carriage: tripod
- Elevation: −7° to 70°
- Traverse: 360°
- Rate of fire: Maximum: 10–12 rpm Sustained: 5–6 rpm
- Effective firing range: 15.4 km (9.6 mi); 21.9 km (13.6 mi) (with rocket-assisted projectile)

The 122-mm howitzer D-30 (GRAU index 2A18) is a Soviet howitzer that first entered service in 1960. It is a robust piece, the design of which focuses on the essential features of a towed field gun suitable for all conditions. The D-30 has a maximum range of 15.3 km (9.5 mi) or 21.9 km (13.6 mi) using rocket-assisted projectile ammunition.

With its three-leg mounting, the D-30 can be rapidly traversed through 360 degrees. Although no longer manufactured in the countries of the former Soviet Union, the D-30 is still manufactured internationally and is in service in more than 60 countries' armed forces.

The barrel assembly of the 2A18 gun is used in the 2S1 Gvozdika self-propelled howitzer. There are also Egyptian, Chinese, Serbian, and Syrian self-propelled variants and conversions. The Syrian conversion utilizes the hull of the T-34 tank.

== History ==
The 122 mm (4.8 in) (originally 48 lines) calibre was adopted by Russia in the early 20th century, becoming very important to Soviet artillery during the Second World War. Development of the D-30 began in the 1950s, as a replacement for the M-30 howitzer, widely used in divisional and regimental artilleries. The D-30 also replaced the remaining 76 mm (3.0 in) M1942 guns in motor rifle regiments.

Military requirements that led to the D-30 can only be deduced. Its role supporting tank and motor rifle regiments, and Soviet doctrine from World War II, suggest that while indirect fire was the primary role, direct fire anti-tank was very important. The latter is evidenced by the very effective HEAT shell, the low silhouette of the piece, its wide and rapid top-traverse and its shield.

The D-30 was designed by the well established design bureau at Artillery Plant No 9 in Sverdlovsk (now Ekaterinburg), at the time led by the eminent artillery designer Fëdor Fëdorovich Petrov (1902–1978). This team was responsible for designing the earlier M-30, the post-war 152 mm D-20 gun-howitzer, and other guns.

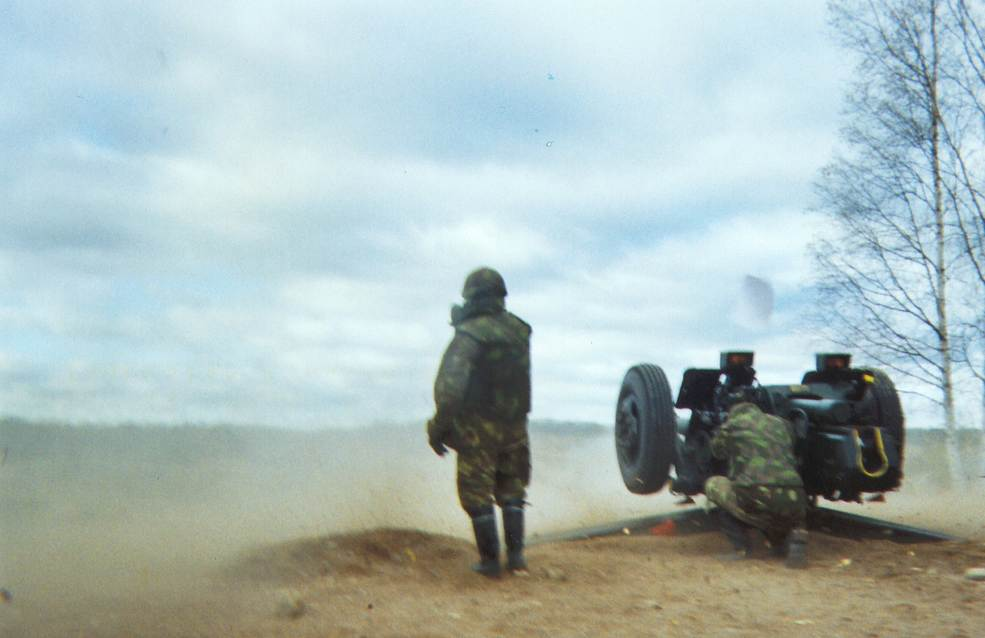
Finnish D-30 in direct fire during a training exercise

Soviet divisional artillery was assigned to manoeuvre regiments (in regimental artillery groups – RAGs) and as divisional troops (in divisional artillery groups – DAGs). A RAG was normally three batteries, each of six pieces, to each motor rifle and tank regiment. DAGs were mostly equipped with 152 mm (6.0 in) pieces, but the DAG of a motor rifle division included a D-30 battalion. The role of an RAG was a normal field artillery role to support maneuver forces with direct and indirect fire.

The D-30 entered Soviet service in 1963 and is sometimes referred to as the M1963. In 1967, widespread introduction of self-propelled guns was authorised and the D-30's barrel and ammunition was used for the new 2S1. When the 2S1 entered service, it was usually assigned to tank regiments and motor rifle regiments equipped with BMP infantry fighting vehicles (IFVs). D-30s were retained in motor rifle regiments equipped with BTR APCs.

The D-30 has been widely exported and used in wars around the world, notably in the Middle East, and particularly in the Iran–Iraq War.

The gun remains a mainstay of artillery forces in developing countries and was deployed in the war in Afghanistan. Soldiers from several Western armies have been trained on the D-30 by various user nations in order to be able to train Afghan soldiers on it.

In 2017, the Algerian military displayed a locally developed variant mounted on a Mercedes-Benz Zetros truck. It includes four stabilization legs to absorb firing impacts.

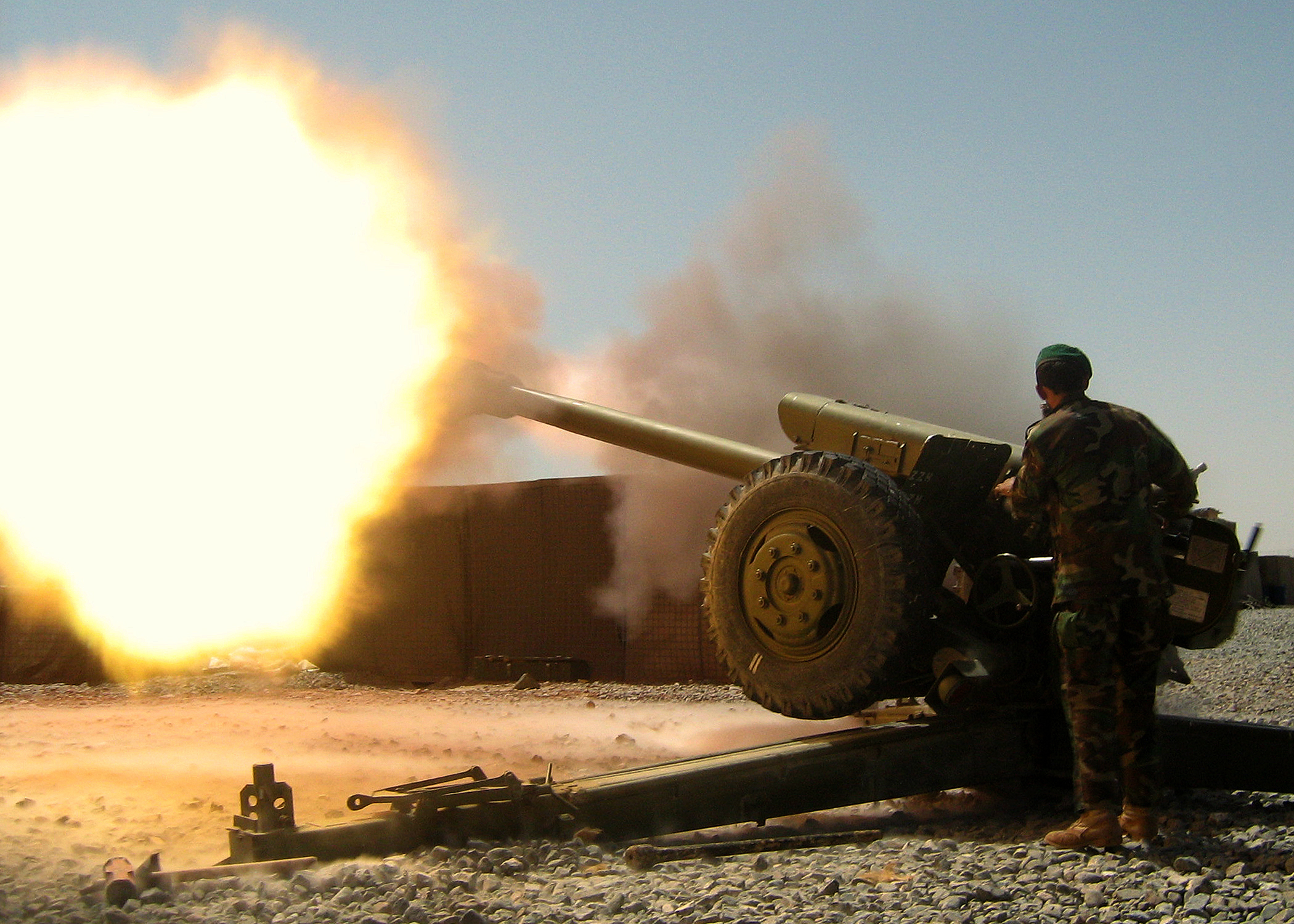
Afghan National Army 205th Corps D-30 shooting indirect fire mission, Zabul Province, September 2009

== Description ==
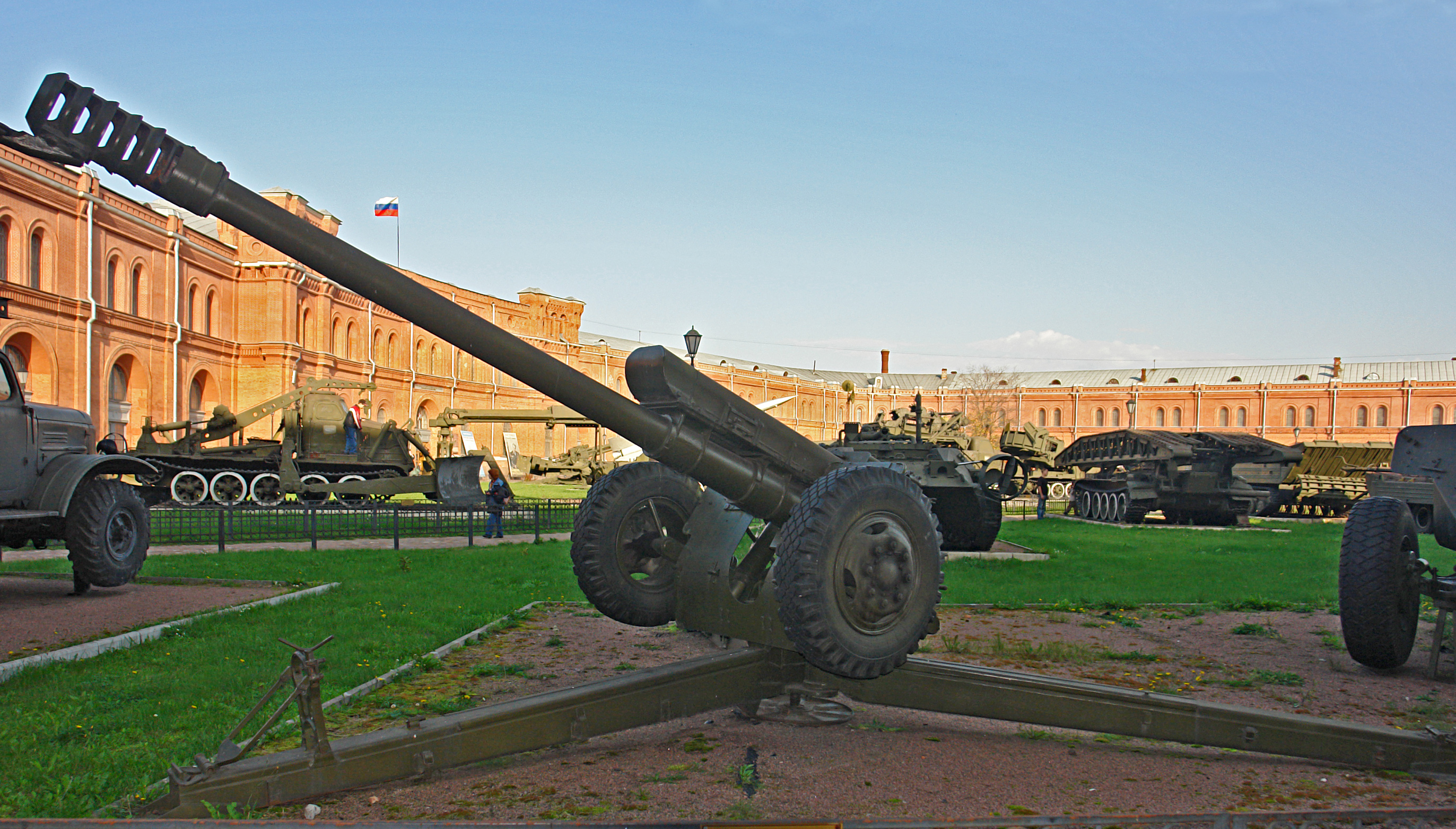
D-30 122 mm howitzer

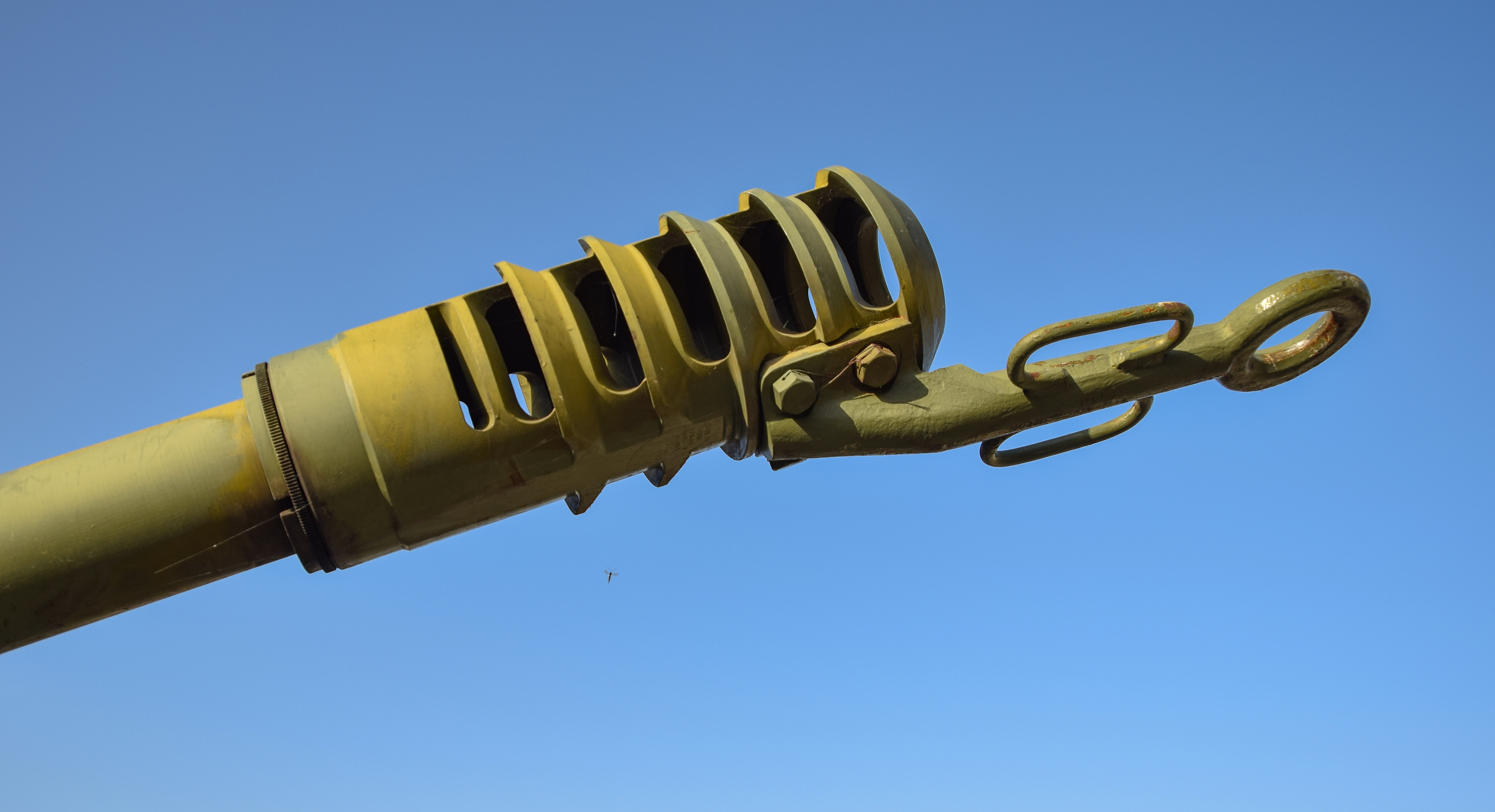
The tow linkage under the muzzle

Distinctive features of the D-30 include its low mobile mounting and above-barrel recoil system. The three-legged mobile mount is unusual for field artillery, with stabilizers that are clamped together for towing and deployed when in action. A large tow linkage is fixed to the muzzle; in transport the barrel serves as a trail. Similar mounts were a feature of several 76 mm (3.0 in) pre-war (1931–1935) universal (both field and anti-aircraft) guns designed by Leningrad's Kirov Plant (L-1, L-2 and L-3). Other examples were the 1939 French 47SA39 APX, and 1943 German 105 mm (4.1 in) light field howitzers designs by Skoda and Krupp; neither entered service. The Bofors 105 mm (4.1 in) L28 Light Field Howitzer 4140 was similarly arranged with four legs and did enter Swedish service. The 1930s-designed British 2-pounder anti-tank gun was another piece featuring a three-legged mounting.

Compared to the M-30, the new howitzer had a significantly longer 35 calibre gun barrel, just short of being a gun-howitzer by Soviet definition. Like other guns of the period, it had a high efficiency muzzle brake; this improved muzzle velocity by 175 m/s (570 ft/s) to a maximum of 650 m/s (2,100 ft/s) for HE, and with an increased maximum range by 3,500 m (2.2 mi) beyond the similar M-30. The maximum range was 2,000 m (1.2 mi) better than the 76 mm (3.0 in) M1942 at 15.4 km (9.6 mi). Weight increased by 650 kg (1,430 lb) over the M-30, to 3,150 kg (6,940 lb); the D-30 is over twice the weight of the 76 mm M1942. Accuracy improved, with mean error at about 10 km (6.2 mi) dropping from 35 m (38 yd) with the M-30 to just 21 m (23 yd).

Effective stabilisation length is a fundamental aspect of a gun mount, and legs 120° apart need to be longer than those with a smaller angle. The D-30's design minimises this problem in several ways. Trunnions are close to the ground, as a result of placing the recoil system and cradle above the barrel. The trunnions are also at the very rear of the breech; this maximises the recoil space when firing at higher elevation angles. Their rearward position also pushes the recoiling element forward on the mount, maximizing relative rearward span of the stabilizers and so stability during recoil. Additionally, there is a very efficient muzzle brake, which absorbs about half the recoil. There is no mechanism to reduce recoil length as the angle of elevation increases.

Some of the design decisions have a price. The muzzle brake produces about twice the overpressure in the area around the gun than is acceptable to Western armies, and is the reason it is often seen being fired with a long lanyard, which reduces rate of fire. Furthermore, the maximum elevation angle is restricted to 18° (early versions) or 22° (later versions) when the breech is over a trail leg. This is enforced by a mechanical cam that prevents the piece firing for about 60% of the total top traverse, and limits range to about 12 km (7.5 mi), with full maximum range only possible in the central arc of about 48° between each pair of legs. The extreme rearward location of the trunnions means the elevating mass is unbalanced, requiring a strong balancing mechanism to enable manual elevation. To do this, the D-30 uses compression balancing gears.

A central jack is powered by hand-operated hydraulics. This jack is lowered while the wheels are raised to permit two of the stabiliser legs to be swung 120° rearwards. The mounting is then lowered, and the ends of the legs spiked to the ground. This mounting provides for quick traversing to fire in any direction.

The pair of large tires are suspended on a single trailing arm; the maximum towing speed is 60 km/h (37 mph) on the road. As was normal in Soviet designs, the tires were filled with foam. Initially, the D-30 had no brakes and no seat for the layer—non-essential luxuries.

A sliding block breech was adopted instead of the M-30's pre-1914 screw pattern, giving a slight increase in the rate of fire. It is a semi-automatic vertical sliding block breech, with a tied jaw; the block moves down to open and opens automatically ejecting the empty cartridge case as the recuperator forces the gun tube back into battery after a round is fired. The design is closely related to those of breeches on other Soviet post–World War II guns and howitzers.

The non-reciprocating sights are standard Soviet pattern, designed for one-man laying. Included are a direct fire anti-tank telescope, a panoramic periscopic indirect-fire sight (dial sight) in a reciprocating mounting, an angle of sight scale, and a range drum for each charge engraved with the range (distance) scale. The elevation leveling bubble is mounted on the dial sight mount. The range drum enables the standard Soviet technique of semi-direct fire when the piece is laid visually on the target and the range set on the range drum.

Soviet 122 mm (4.8 in) howitzers used different ammunition to 122 mm (4.8 in) guns, although there is some compatibility. In the case of ammunition for the D-30, the standard 122 mm (4.8 in) howitzer shell weight of 21.8 kg (48 lb) was retained, with a metal cartridge case holding variable propelling charges. Cartridge and shell are loaded separately; this means that the shells have to be hand-rammed by a man to the right of the breech with a ramming rod. The D-30 could fire the older M-30 ammunition; however, new shells were also introduced, eventually including a rocket-assisted projectile with a range of 21.9 km (13.6 mi). The M-30's range of propelling charges, comprising base and eight increments, was replaced by a new set comprising base and four increments; single base propellant was retained. A more effective High Explosive (HE) shell was developed, as well as smoke, illumination, and chemical filled projectiles.

In keeping with Soviet doctrine, the anti-tank role is important; there is a HEAT shell capable of penetrating 460 mm (18 in) of steel armour plate.

The maximum rate of fire of the D-30 is 6–8 rounds per minute, and about 75 rounds per hour. There is disagreement as to whether this maximum rate of fire is achievable for indirect fire. Based on reloading speeds of similar guns using separate charges, solo re-laying, and given a stable emplacement, semi-automatic breech and no long lanyard, (examples are the 25-pdr and 105 mm (4.1 in) L118), and assuming concurrent lay adjustment during reloads, then it probably is when in the hands of a competent detachment. However, 5–6 rounds per minute may be more realistic with a poorly trained gun crew.

The D-30 is noted for simplicity of maintenance by its users; reputedly, there are no special tools, and all jobs can be done with a wrench and large hammer. However, like any other gun, routine maintenance is essential, and Western troops in Afghanistan have reported Afghan operated D-30s having problems with shells sticking in the barrel due to lack of cleaning.

The D-30 is known as hehtaaripyssy (literally "Hectare Gun") in the Finnish military, as the scatter area of the shrapnel of the shell is approximately one hectare.

=== Self-propelled versions ===
- 2S1 Gvozdika was developed on basis of MT-LB tracked vehicles that were often employed by Soviet forces for towing instead of trucks. Combining the gun D-30 with the chassis of the MT-LB, the 2S1 Gvozdika was made. This was the first Soviet enclosed turret self-propelled artillery gun, going into service in the early 1970s. The 2S1 is very light and mobile, and amphibious without preparation. Good mobility and the quick reaction abilities of the 2S1 enhance the flexibility of the D-30, reducing its vulnerability in maneuver battles.
- Sora 122mm Most modern self-propelled version of the D-30J with automatic loader, inertial navigation system (INS) and fire control system, mounted on a modified FAP 2026 chassis designed by Military Technical Institute Belgrade.
- SH-2 Chinese wheeled version developed by Norinco. It has a modern fire control system and howitzer is elevated by electric motors.
- PLZ-07 Chinese version of tracked D-30 122 mm. It has NBC protection system, night/day driving vision, firing control system.
- Semser developed by Israel's Soltam under contract to the Kazakhstani Ministry of Defense, manufactured by local Kazakh companies. Has an integrated automated command and control system, provided by Soltam and Elbit. Is based on KamAZ-6350 8x8 chassis.

Other countries have produced self-propelled versions of the D-30 by mounting the gun on tracked or wheeled vehicles at the disposal of their armed forces. Most such vehicles do not have any complex fire control system and are manually loaded and elevated. Cuba, Sudan, Laos, Syria, and Egypt have produced such simplified variants.

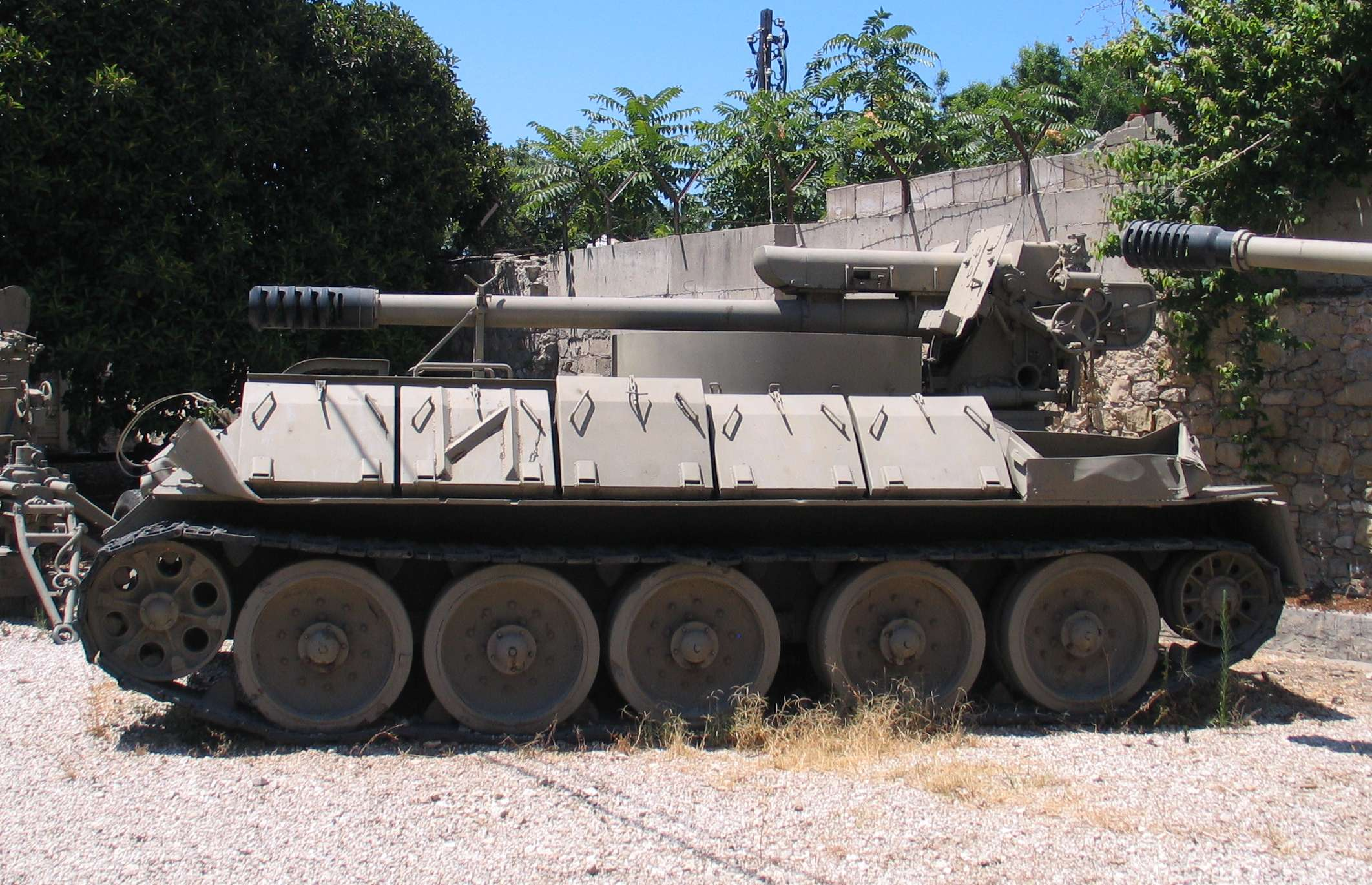
Syrian D-30 self-propelled artillery conversion on the hull of a T-34 tank

Post 1973, Syrian and Egyptian armed forces fielded D-30 guns fitted to the hulls of obsolete T-34 tanks, similar to Israeli conversions of Sherman hulls. This rather crude modification improves the speed of divisional artillery, allowing for the ability to match speed with frontline mechanized forces. A major drawback is the lack of protection for the gunners.

=== Variants ===
- 2A18 or D-30 – basic model, as described.
  - 2A18M or D-30M – new double baffle muzzle brake, square central base plate, towing lunette assembly.
  - 2A18M-1 or D-30M-1 – with semi-automatic loader. Prototype.
  - D-30A – modified recoil system, new muzzle brake.
  - 2S1 Gvozdika self-propelled version.
- D-30-2 Chinese improved copy of the D-30, modified to accept Norinco made extended range ammunition.
  - D-30-3 – Chinese upgrade of the Type 56 85 mm (3.3 in) field gun with 122 mm (4.8 in) weapon.
  - Type 85 or Type 86 – also called W86, Chinese licence-production or derivative of the D-30, towed.
  - Type 96 – PL-96, Chinese licence-production or derivative of the D-30 and lightweight version of the Type 86. Mass-produced variant.
- D30 RH M-94 – Croatian-built version, new muzzle brake, redesigned trail, improved hydraulic brake.
- D 30-M – Egyptian license version of the D-30.
  - SPH 122 – Self-propelled version, mounted on a modified M109 chassis.
  - T-122 – Self-propelled version, mounted on a modified T-34 chassis.
- HM 40 or D-30I – Iranian version. Is believed to be an exact copy with no visual or functional changes.
- D-30J – Yugoslav version of the D-30, it features a simplified muzzle brake, a hydraulic firing jack to ease and speed up combat operation, and maximum firing range is increased from 15,400 m (16,800 yd) to 17,300 m (18,900 yd)
  - Saddam – Iraqi copy of the D-30J produced by Saad 5 (Saddam Engineering Complex). Production was halted after the Gulf War
  - D-30JA1 – Improved Serbian version – further development of D-30J.
  - Sora 122mm – Self-propelled version of D-30J
  - M-91 "Mona" – Yugoslav variant with the 100 mm (3.9 in) ordnance of the MT-12. Prototype only.
- Khalifa-1 – Sudanese licensed version of the D-30.
- Al Thahadi – Iraqi-made version of the D-30.

== Ammunition ==
The D-30 fires separate loading projectiles, with variable charges.

	Available projectiles
Designation	Type	Fuze	Weight	Explosive filler/payload	Muzzle velocity (max. propellant charge)	Armor penetration	Notes
OF-462	FRAG-HE	RGM-2, D-1, D1U; V-90, AR-5	21.76 kg (48.0 lb)	3.675 kg (8.10 lb) of TNT	690 m/s (2,300 ft/s)	n/a
3OF56	FRAG-HE	RGM-2, D-1, D1U; V-90, AR-5	21.76 kg (48.0 lb)	4.05 kg (8.9 lb) of A-IX-2	690 m/s (2,300 ft/s)	n/a	Improved HE-FRAG.
SH-1	AP Flechete	RGM-2, D-1, D1U; V-90, AR-5	?	?	?	n/a	?
BK-6M	HEAT-FS	GPV-2	17.47 kg (38.5 lb)	1.6 kg (3.5 lb) of A-X-1	740 m/s (2,400 ft/s)	460 to 580 mm (18 to 23 in)
BK-13	HEAT-FS-T	V-15	21.4 kg (47 lb)	2.1 kg (4.6 lb)	?	?
S-463	Illumination	T-7	22.4 kg (49 lb)	1 kg (2.2 lb) flare	690 m/s (2,300 ft/s)	n/a	Illumination time ≥ 25 s
D-462	Smoke	KTM-2	22.3 kg (49 lb)	3.6 kg (7.9 lb) of WP	690 m/s (2,300 ft/s)	n/a
3OF69M	Laser guided	?	28 kg (62 lb)	5.3 kg (12 lb) HE-FRAG	?	?
?	ICM	Ms-1	22.5 kg (50 lb)	18 M-42 bomblets or 15 M-42D bomblets	683 m/s (2,240 ft/s)	M42 – 70 mm (2.8 in); M42D – 110 mm (4.3 in)	Egyptian made
M335 (CL 3153)	ICM	?	22.5 kg (50 lb)	24 M85 bomblets	698 m/s (2,290 ft/s)	105 mm (4.1 in)	Israeli round
TF ER BB ХМ09	FRAG-HE			?		n/a	Range 21,500 m (13.4 mi)
TF ER BT ХМ08	FRAG-HE					n/a	Range 18,500 m (11.5 mi) produced by Sloboda Čačak
Norinco ERFB/HB	FRAG-HE	?	21.76 kg (48.0 lb)	?	725 m/s (2,380 ft/s)	n/a	Chinese produced
Norinco ERFB/BB	FRAG-HE	?	22.25 kg (49.1 lb)	?	730 m/s (2,400 ft/s)	n/a	Chinese produced
Norinco Cargo	ICM	?	21.76 kg (48.0 lb)	30 Type 81 bomblets	682 m/s (2,240 ft/s)	80 mm (3.1 in)	Chinese produced
Norinco HE-I	HE-I	?	21.76 kg (48.0 lb)	?	690 m/s (2,300 ft/s)	n/a	Chinese produced
Norinco Smoke	Smoke	?	22.15 kg (48.8 lb)	3.2 kg (7.1 lb) of WP	690 m/s (2,300 ft/s)	n/a	Chinese produced, produces smoke for more than 70 seconds.
Norinco Illumination	Illumination	?	21.3 kg (47 lb)	1.09 kg (2.4 lb) flare	683 m/s (2,240 ft/s)	n/a	Chinese produced, 600,000 candela flare, burns for 50 seconds.

Ammunition for the D-30
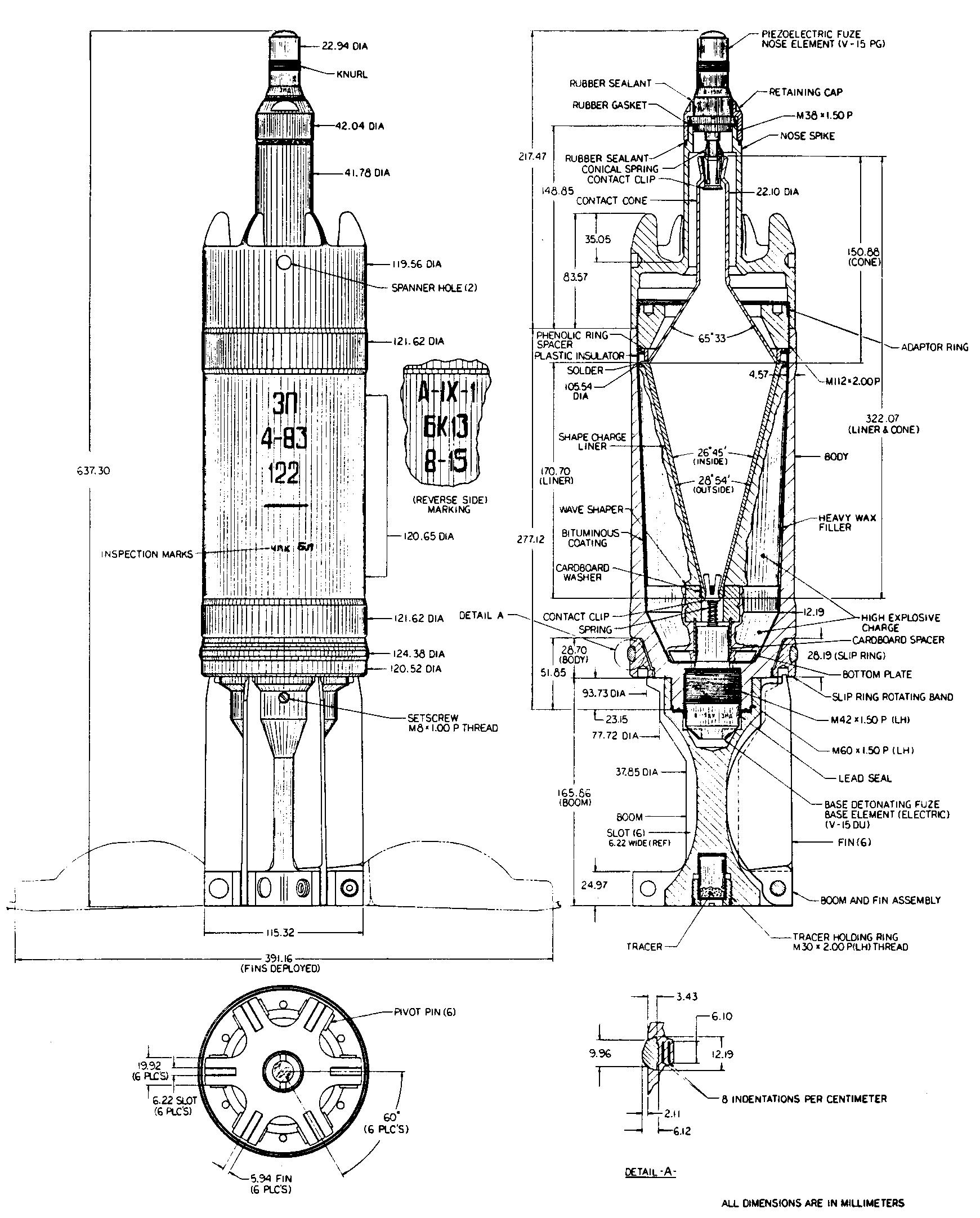
BK-13 HEAT shell

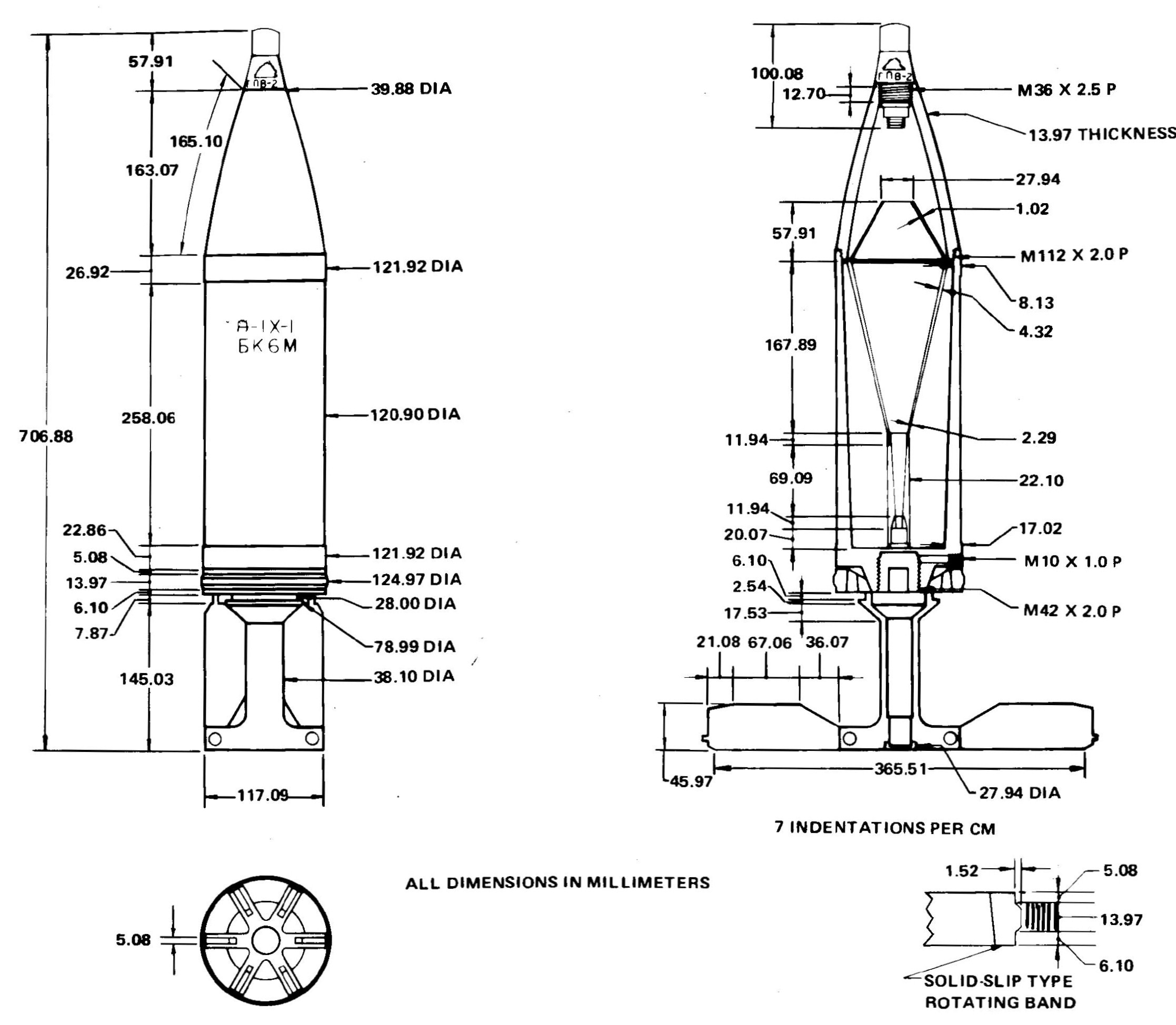
BK-6M HEAT shell

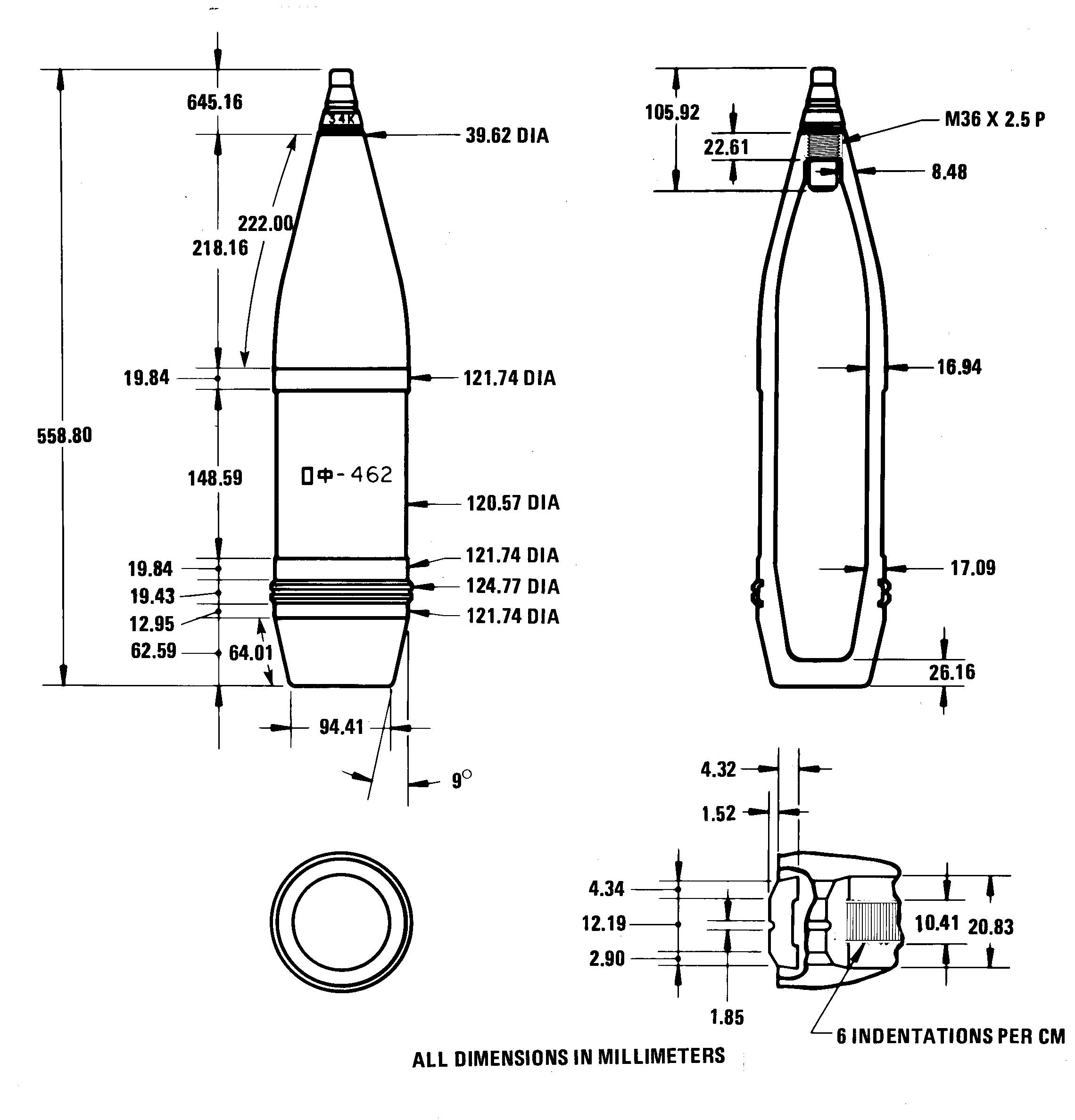
OF-462 HE shell

== Operators ==
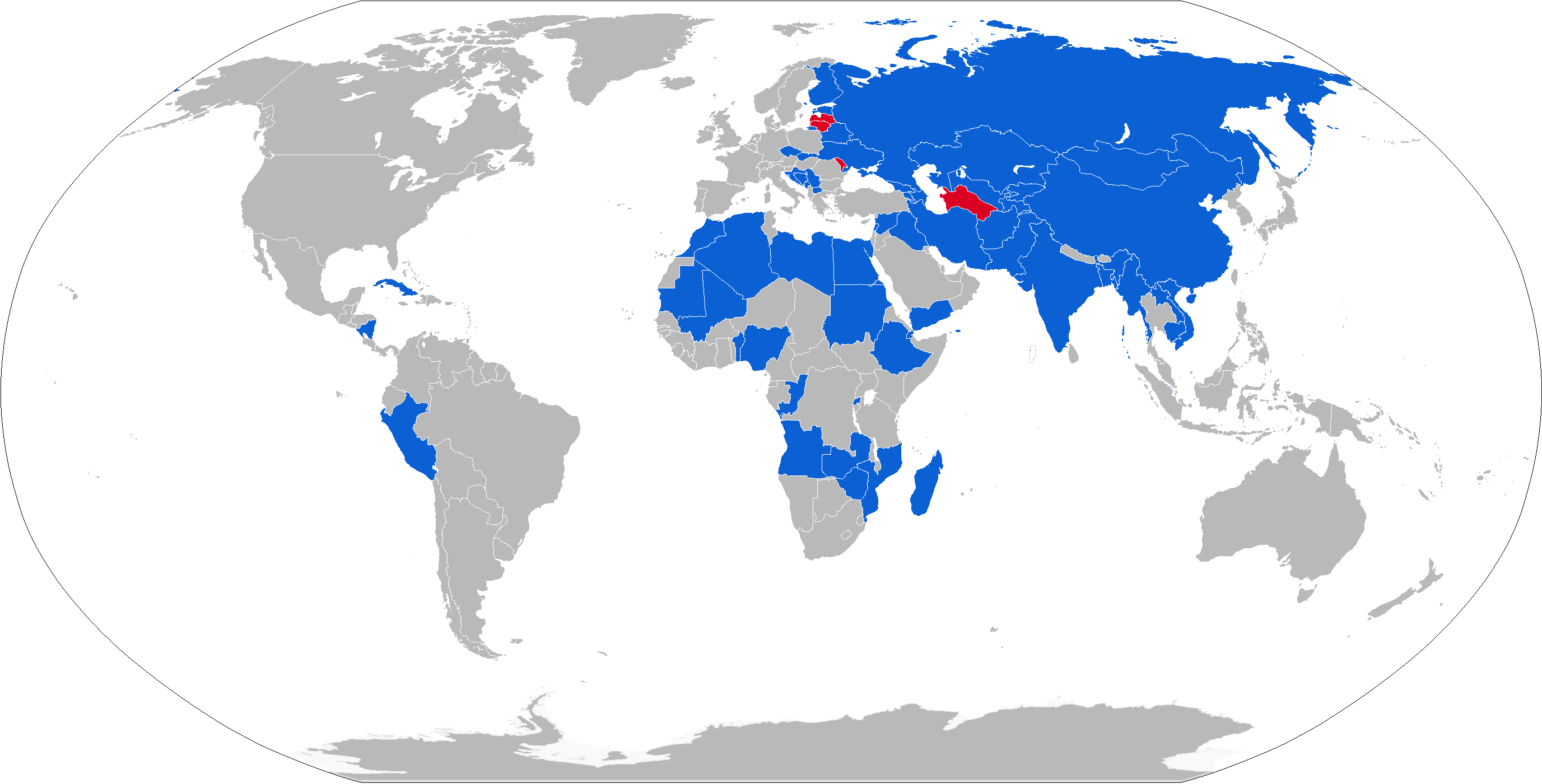
Map of D-30 operators Current Former

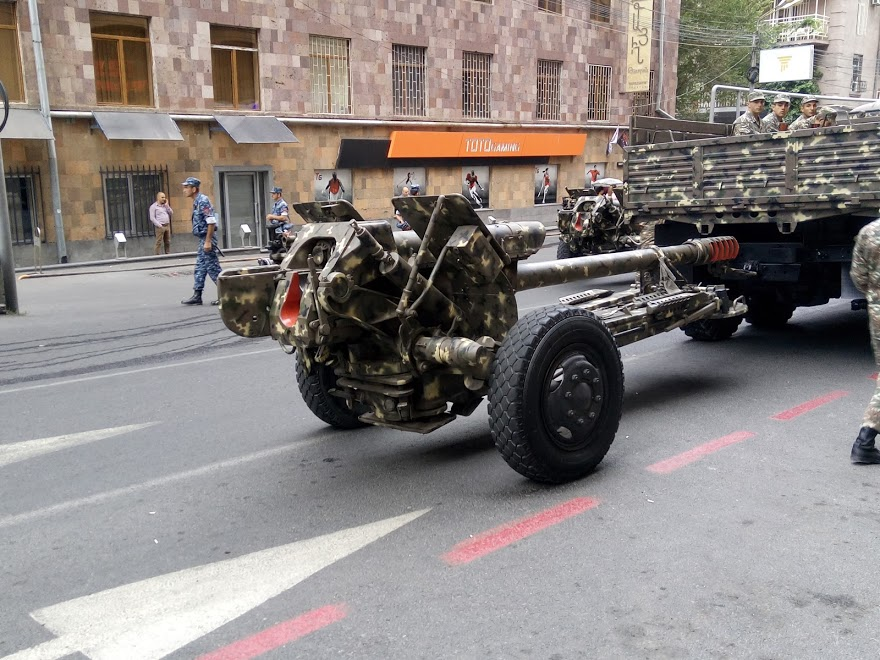
D-30 of Armenian Army

=== Current operators ===
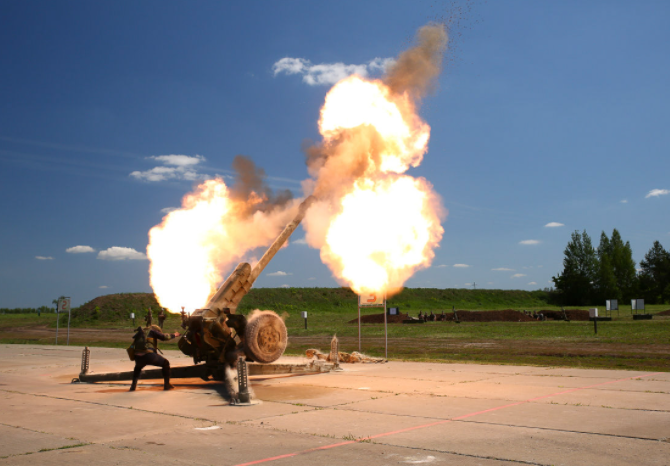
Shot from the D-30 howitzer

- Afghanistan: 41 as of 19 October 2025
- Algeria: 160
- Angola: 500
- Armenia: 69
- Azerbaijan: 129
- Bangladesh: 54 of PL-96 variant
- Belarus: 48
- Bosnia-Herzegovina: 100
- Burundi: 18
- Cambodia
- China: 500 Type 96 variant
- Republic of the Congo: 10
- Democratic Republic of the Congo
- Croatia: 54
- Cuba: 100 mounted on T-34, 55 mounted on T-55 chassis and 25 mounted on KrAZ-255 6×6 trucks.
- Egypt: 190 D-30M
- Djibouti: 9
- Eritrea
- Estonia: 42 H63, delivered in 2009. All or almost all transferred to Ukraine since 2022.
- Ethiopia: 309 delivered in 1998–2000.
  - Tigray Defense Forces
- Finland: 471 H63
- Ghana: 6
- Georgia: 58
- Guinea-Bissau: 18
- India: 520
- Iran: 540
- Iraq
  - Kurdistan Region: 200, the mainstay of the Peshmerga Artillery
- Kazakhstan: 100
- Kyrgyzstan: 72
- Laos
- Lebanon: 42
- Libya
- Madagascar: 12
- Mauritania: 20
- Mongolia
- Montenegro: 12
- Mozambique: 12
- Myanmar: 560
- Nicaragua: 12
- Nigeria
- Niger: 20
- North Korea
- Oman: 30
- Pakistan: 189
- Peru
- Russia: 4,570
- Rwanda: 6
- Sahrawi Arab Democratic Republic: 12
- Serbia: 78
- Slovakia: still in use but only for parades
- South Sudan: 5 received from Ukraine in 2013. The Sudan People's Liberation Army captured others from Sudan during the Second Sudanese Civil War
- Sudan: 21
- Syria
- Tajikistan: 10
- Tanzania: 20
- Turkmenistan: 350
- Ukraine: 129
- Uzbekistan: 60
- Vietnam
- Zambia: 25
- Zimbabwe: 4
- Somaliland: 31

=== Former operators ===
- Artsakh − Seized by Azerbaijan after the 2023 Azerbaijani offensive in Nagorno-Karabakh
- Boko Haram
- Czechoslovakia
- East Germany: Passed on to reunified Germany.
- Germany
- Islamic State
- Israel: 5 as of 2016
- Moldova – 18 from Romania, delivered in 1992.
- Poland – Not operational.
- Somalia: 12
- Soviet Union – Passed on to successor states.
- Yemen: 130 as of 2015
- Yugoslavia – Passed on to successor states.

== Sources ==
- Bellamy, Chris (1986). Red God of War: Soviet Artillery and Rocket Forces. Brassey's Defence Publishers. ISBN 0-08-031200-4.
- Foss, Christopher F, ed. (1994). Jane's Armour and Artillery 1994−1995 (15th ed.). Surrey: Jane's Information Group. ISBN 0-7106-1154-4.
- International Institute for Strategic Studies (2015). The Military Balance. Vol. 115. Routledge. ISBN 978-1-85743-766-9.
- International Institute for Strategic Studies (February 2016). The Military Balance 2016. Vol. 116. Routledge. ISBN 9781857438352.
- International Institute for Strategic Studies (2020). The Military Balance. Vol. 120. Routledge. ISBN 978-0-367-46639-8.
