= PM M71 Floating Bridge =

The PM M71 is a Socialist Federal Republic of Yugoslavia (SFRJ) licence-built pontoon bridge of the Soviet PMP Floating Bridge designed after the WWII. The PM M71 deployment process is the same as for Soviet PMP and was primary designed and used by Yugoslav People's Army.

Development of the PM M71 began at the end of the 1960s in the MTRZ Sava Kovačević plant in Tivat, with the designation "Project 382". Production began in 1971 and deliveries were made to the Yugoslav People's Army throughout the 1970s and 1980s.

Similar to the Soviet PMP, the PM M71 initially used Yugoslav-made FAP 2220 BDS/A trucks for transporting and FAP 1314 S/AV for towing and removing the RPP M68 tugboat. During the 1980s, the set was modernized with newer FAP 2026 BDS/A and FAP 2026 BS/AVG trucks.

The PM M71 bridging set includes:

- 32 floating sections (pontoons),
- 4 abutment sections,
- 2 road covers,
- 12 RPP M68 tugboats,
- 38 FAP 2026 BDS/A trucks for transportation of the sections,
- 12 FAP 2026 BDS/AVG trucks for towing of tugboats,
- other accompanying elements (boats, tools, accessories, etc.)

The complete set of PM M71 equipment is used to construct 20 ton and 60 ton carrying capacity bridges and 20 ton up to 180 ton carrying capacity ferries. During Croatian army exercise Kupa 17, it was noted that a main battle tank can move at 30 km / h, with the distance of 30 meters between tanks across a deployed PM M71 bridge.

== Usage ==
After the breakup of Yugoslavia, the PM M-71 was used in the Yugoslav Army, Army of Republika Srpska and the Croatian Armed Forces.

Currently, two pontoon battalions of the River Flotilla of Serbian Armed Forces are equipped with the PM M71.

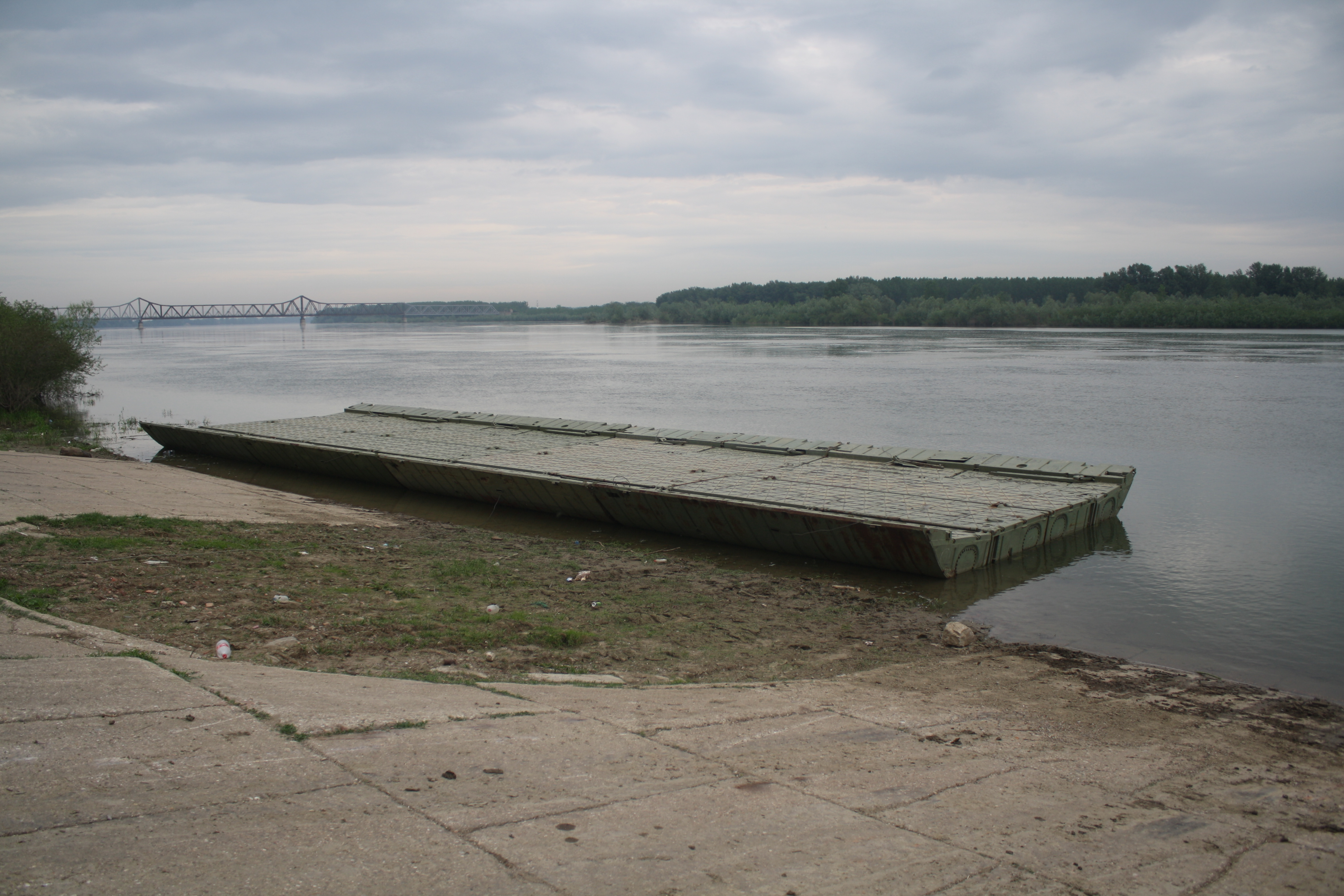
4 floating sections connected in to ferry

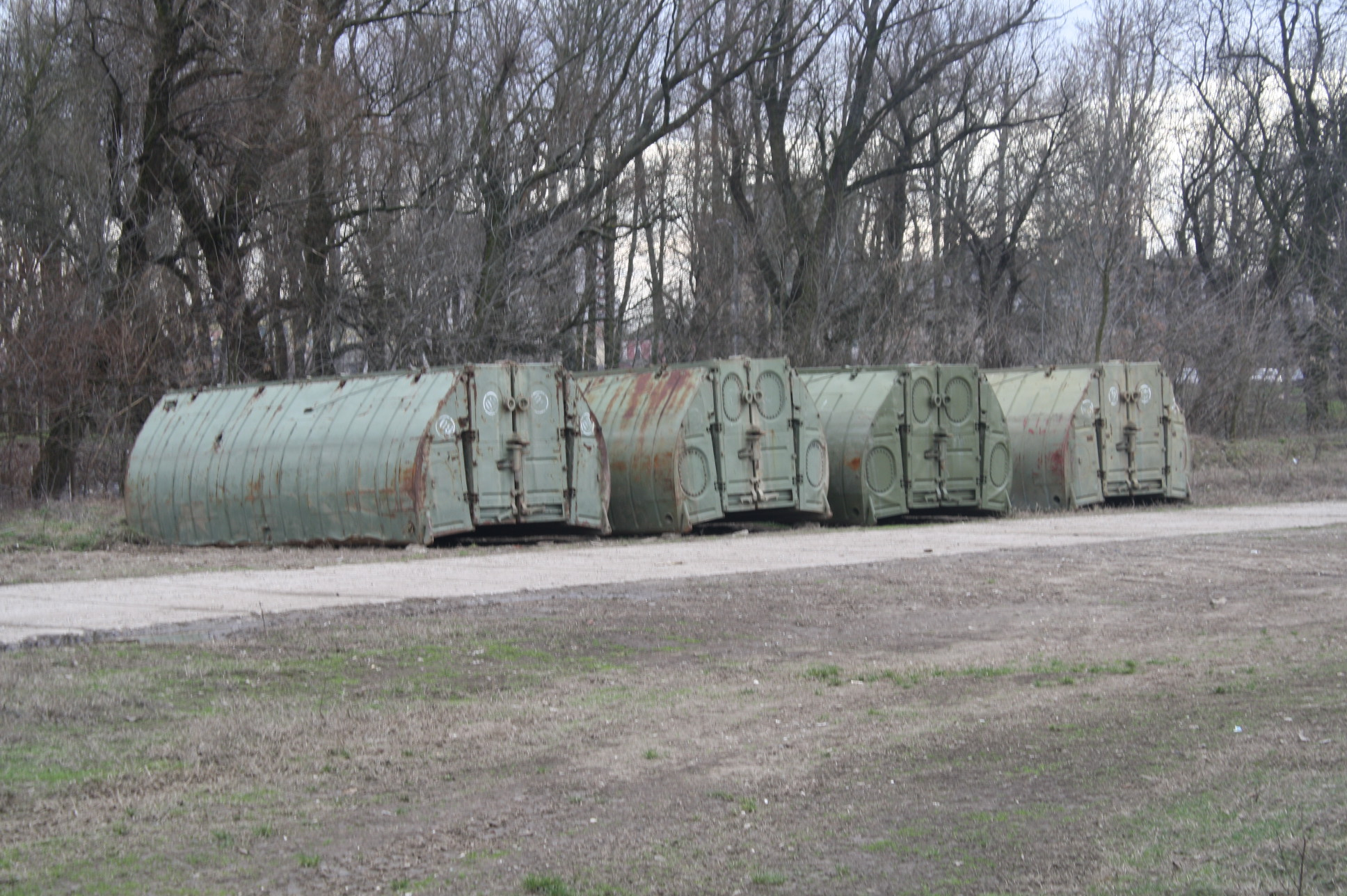
4 floating sections

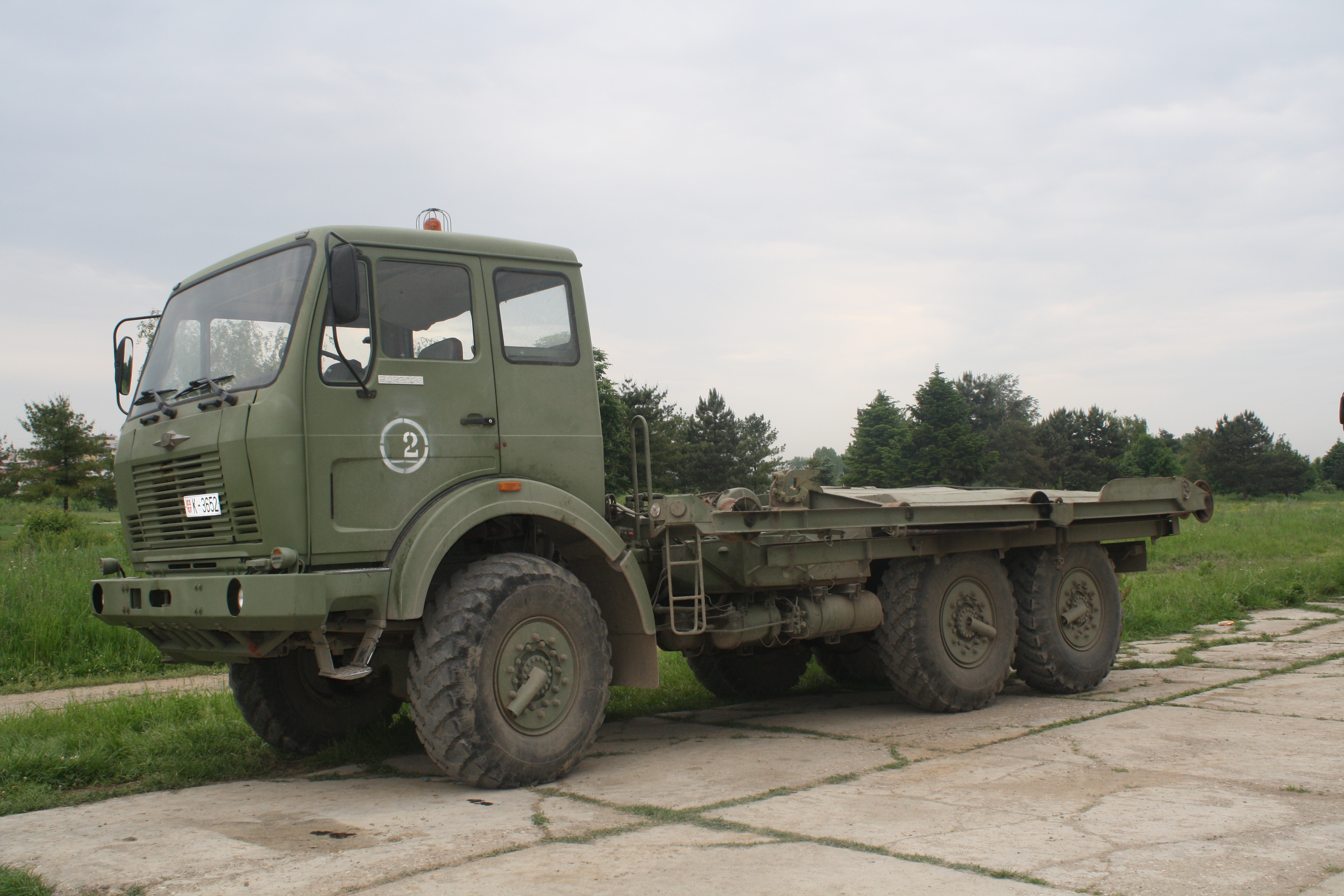
FAP 2026 BDS/A

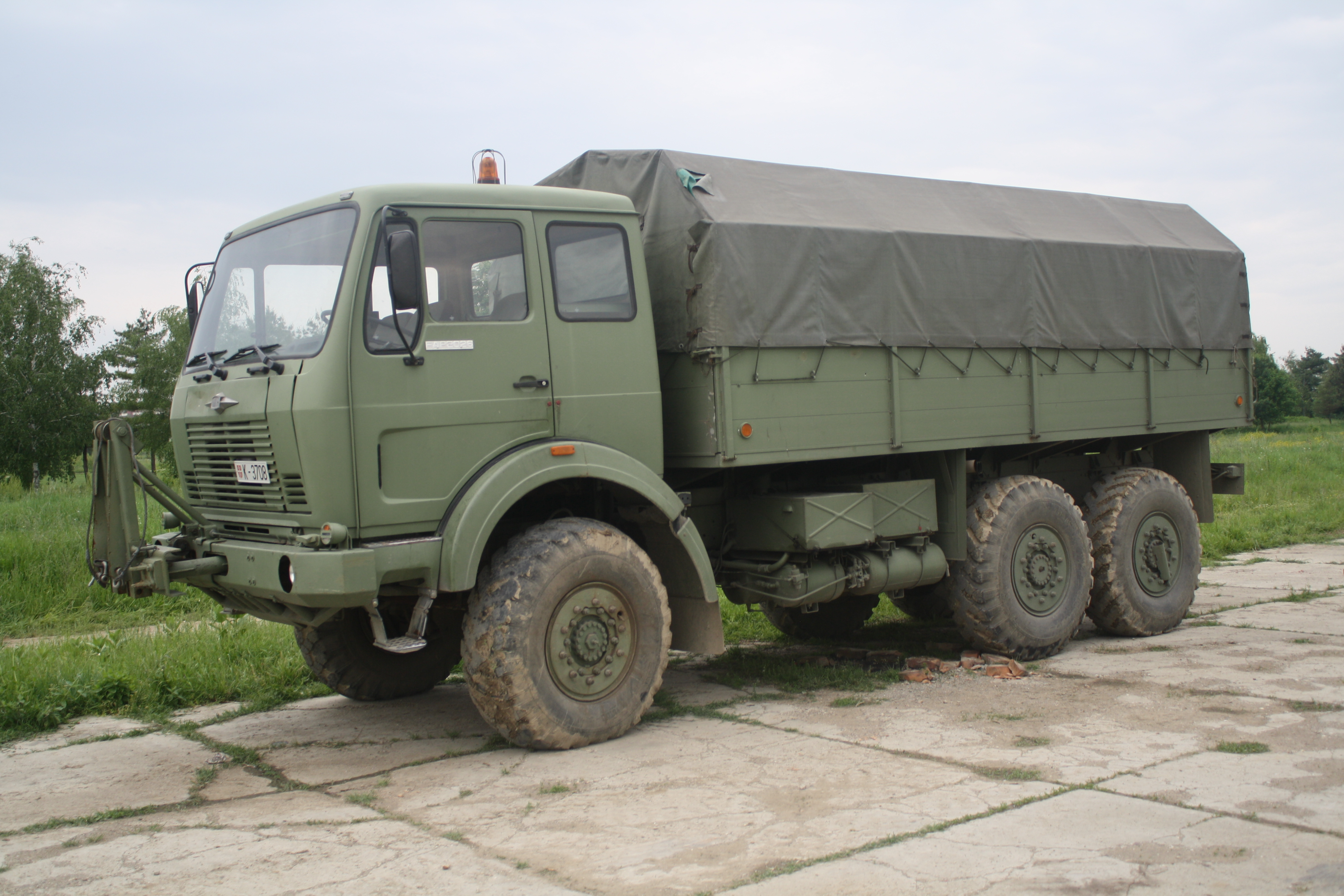
FAP 2026 BDS/AVG

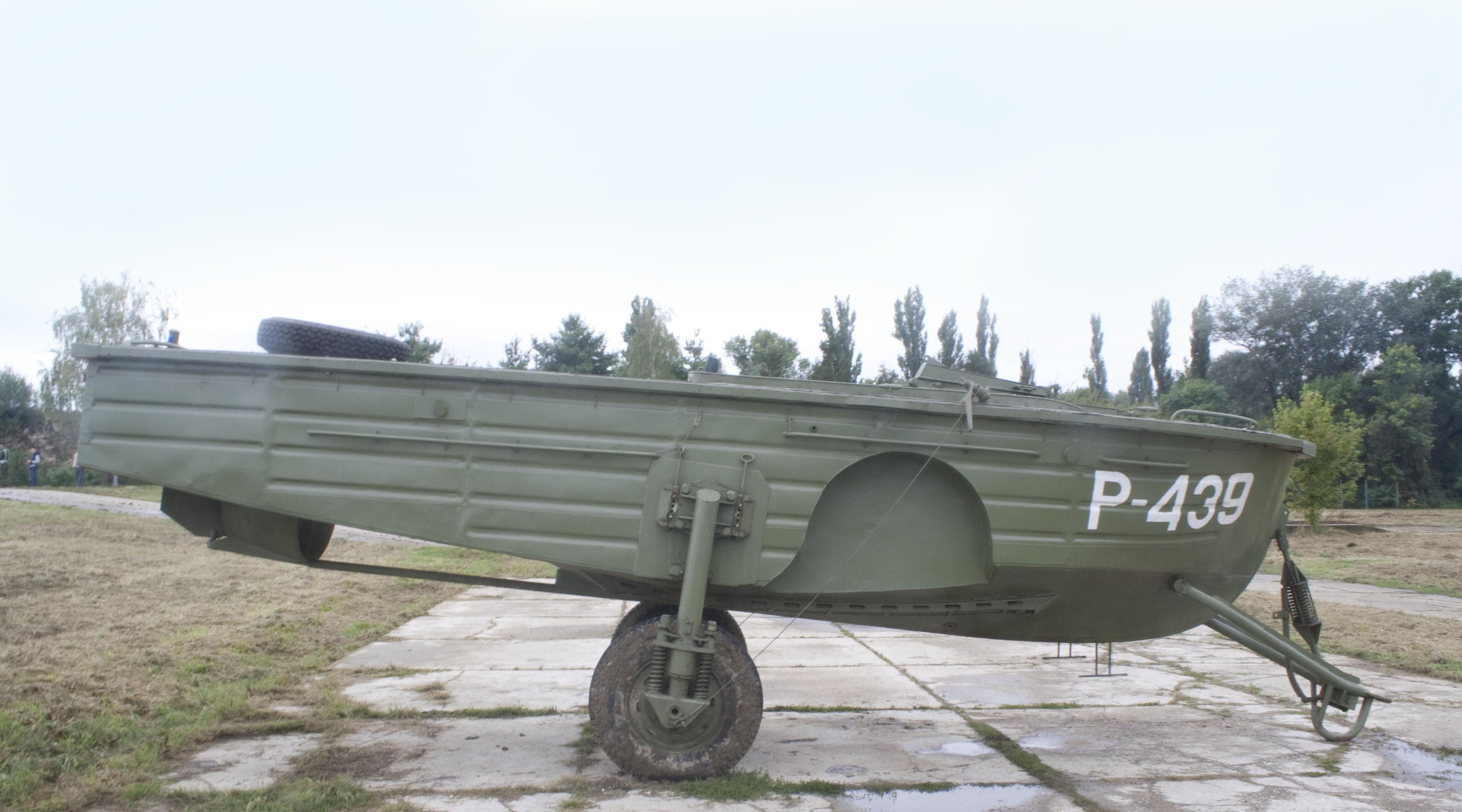
RPP M68
