= SORA self-propelled howitzer =

Self-propelled howitzer 122mm SORA
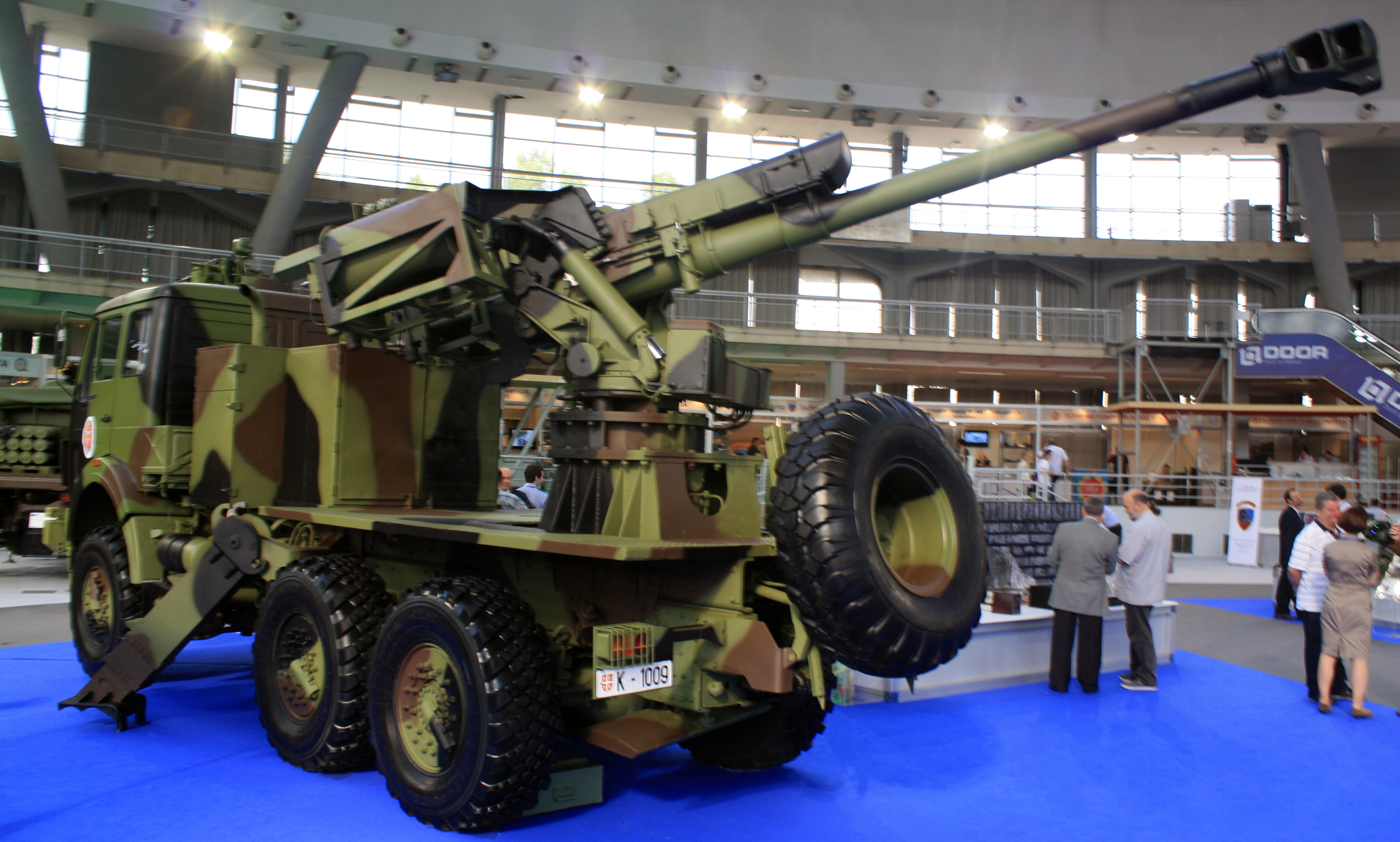
- SORA at 2013 Partner military fair
- Type: Self-propelled artillery
- Place of origin: Serbia

Production history
- Designer: Military Technical Institute
- Manufacturer: 14. oktobar, PPT Namenska
- No. built: 2 prototypes

Specifications
- Mass: 18 t (18 long tons; 20 short tons)
- Crew: 3
- Shell: 122 x 447mm R Separate loading charge and projectile
- Caliber: 122 mm (4.8 in)
- Elevation: -5° to +70°
- Traverse: 25° left and right
- Rate of fire: 6 rds/min
- Maximum firing range: TF-462: 15.3 km (9.5 mi); TF ER BT ХМ08: 18.5 km (11.5 mi); TF ER BB ХМ09: 21.5 km (13.4 mi)
- Main armament: 2A18 122 mm (4.8 in) howitzer
- Engine: Mercedes-Benz OM 402; 188 kW (252 hp)
- Power/weight: 10.68 kW/t (14.52 PS/t)
- Operational range: 500 km (310 mi)
- Maximum speed: Road: 80 km/h (50 mph); Off-road: 20 km/h (12 mph)

Self-propelled howitzer 122mm SORA (Serbian: Самоходна хаубица 122mm СОРА, romanized: Samohodna haubica 122mm SORA) is a Serbian 122mm self-propelled howitzer developed by the Military Technical Institute for the Serbian Army. Self-propelled howitzer SORA features whole upper part of 122mm howitzer D-30J mounted on the rear end of modified FAP 2026 BS/AV truck chassis. Main functions of the weapon system, such as navigation, gun lying, loading of ammunition and deployment, are fully automatic.

== Development ==
After the decision to keep the 122mm caliber in use, the Serbian Army decided to modernize D-30 howitzer according to the world trends in self-propelled artillery. Assignment to develop the system was entrusted to the Military Technical Institute, while production of the functional models was given to 14. oktobar.

Work on this project began in 2004 and in 2009 the first functional model was completed. After its initial roll-out, it underwent a series of initial firing trials, involving about 18 rounds, the first three of which were conducted with reduced charges and the remainder with full charges.

Improvements were subsequently made to the stabilisation system, whose forward-facing stabilisers proved unable to adequately absorb the recoil forces during firing. Another goal was to demonstrate loading of the weapon at all elevation angles, and this was successfully achieved, according to MTI.

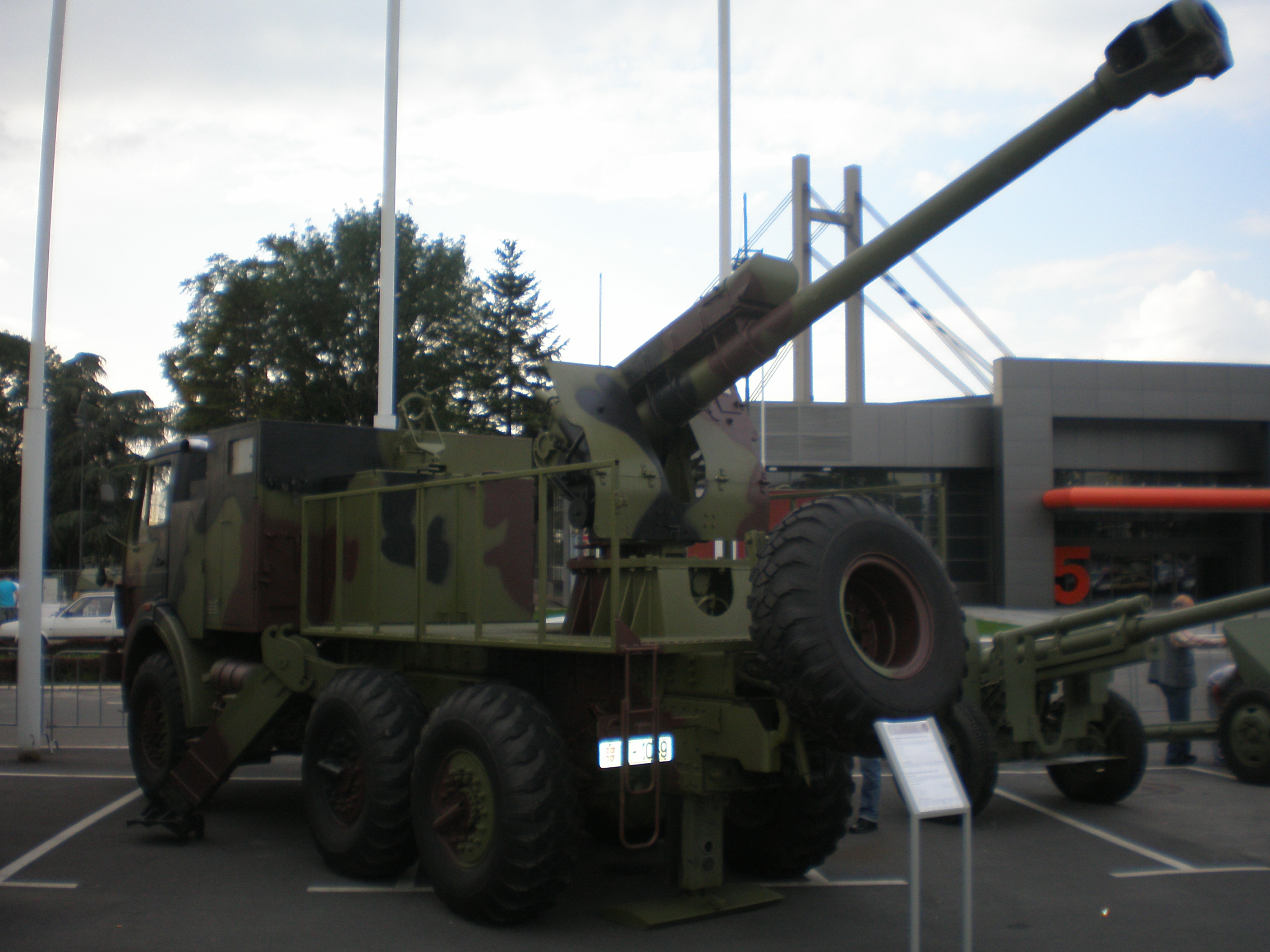
Sora 122mm self-propelled gun-howitzer on display at "Partner 2009" military fair.

The first prototype of SORA was showcased in 2009, representing a fairly simple installation of the 122mm D-30J howitzer on a wheeled chassis.

But that was only the first phase of development. After that, the Military Technical Institute begun work on further improvements of the system, which included installation of the automatic loader, inertial navigation system, automatic transition from the transport position to firing position...

The second prototype of SORA was completed in 2013, and it was showcased at Partner 2013 international weapons fair. This was the final configuration with the 122mm autoloader, inertial and satellite navigation, positioning and orientation subsystems, automatic combat to march position switching and a remote control unit which can be wired or wireless, allowing the control of the howitzer from the distance up to 200 m (220 yd).

Tests of this prototype have been conducting since 2014.

== Description ==
- D30J

In the process of preparation for serial production (in 1975/1976), MTI carried out modifications of the basic Soviet model D-30 into model D-30J (aimed at facilitating operations of the crew during transition from traveling to firing position and reducing the effects of powder gases' overpressure upon the crew), as well as by developing new HE projectile 122 mm M76 with the range of 17.6 km (10.9 mi) (compared to maximum range of 15.3 km (9.5 mi) of Russian round type OF482). Later, during the early 1980s, complete technology transfer of D-30J howitzer with associated sighting devices was made to Iraq (Project KOL-7), including design of entire infrastructure and introduction in production, rated for annual capacity of 200 units.

- FAP 2026 BS/AV

The FAP 2026 BS/AV 6t 6x6 off-road vehicle is designed for transport of crew, weapons and material up to 6 t (5.9 long tons; 6.6 short tons) of total weight, as for traction of weapons and trailer up to 7.2 t (7.1 long tons; 7.9 short tons) of weight.

This vehicle has an 8-cylinder, 4-stroke, water cooled MERCEDES OM 402 diesel engine with direct injection, installed longitudinally under the cab. The vehicle's transmission includes: friction clutch, 6-gear synchronous mechanical gearbox, two-stage differential transfer case that provides permanent all wheels drive, rigid drive axles with leaf springs, additional rubber springs and hydraulic telescopic shock absorbers. The pneumatic braking system has drum brakes on all wheels. The steering is hydraulic with servo assistance. The frame has two longitudinal and several transversal brackets, while the cab is a trambus type. Both inter-axial and all three axial differentials can be locked mechanically. The vehicle has a system of central pressure control in tires.

In this case FAP 2026 is additionally modified and reinforced in order to meet requirements needed for this howitzer.

- Autoloader

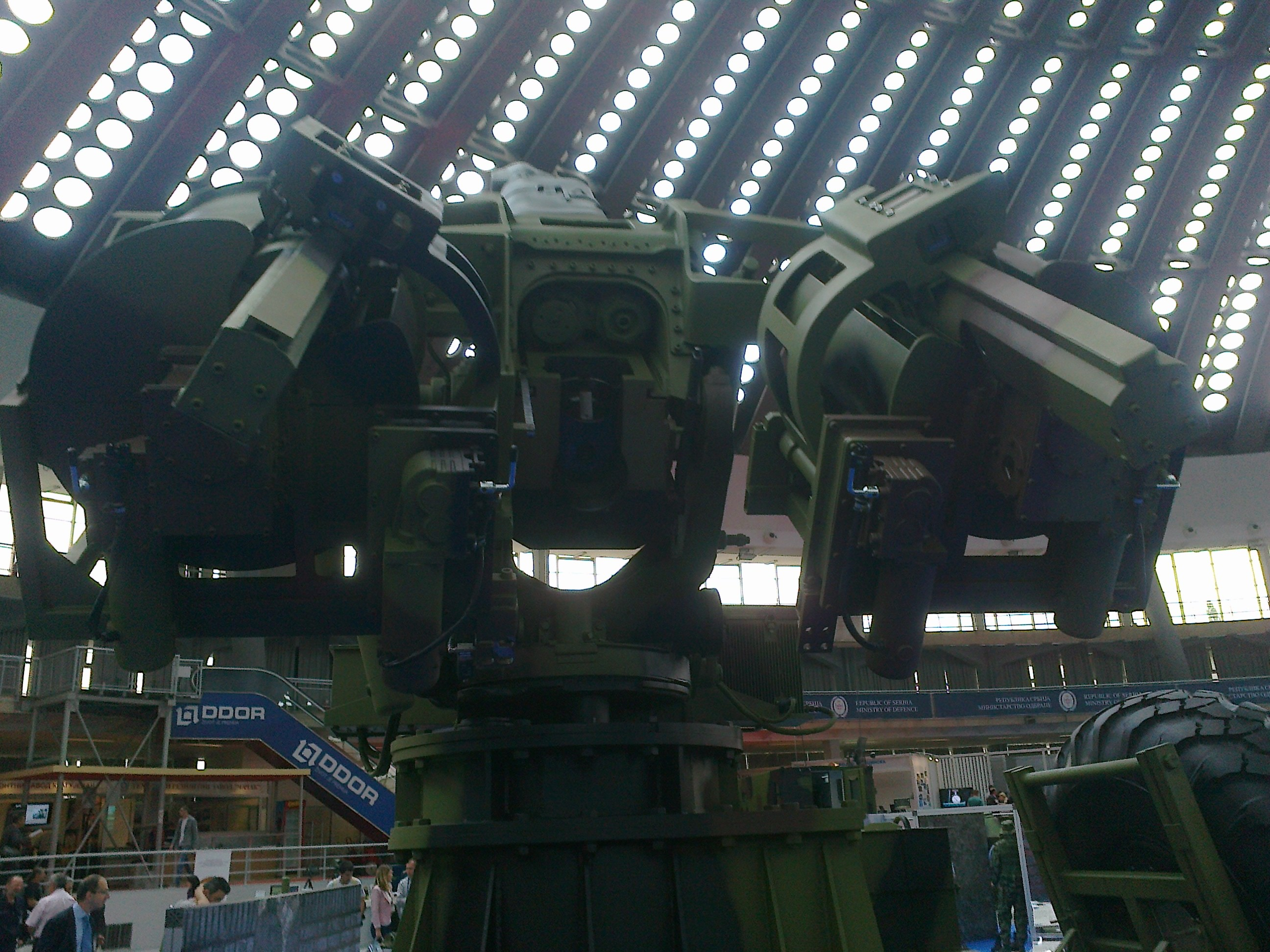
SORA 122mm autoloader at Partner 2013 arms fair.

Autoloader uses six rounds ( projectile and charge ) located in two drums on both sides of the gun. Projectiles in the right drum, the charges on the left. Rate of fire in this configuration is 6 rds/min. Thanks to the high level of automatization, SORA is capable to operate with only two crew members.

- Fire-control system

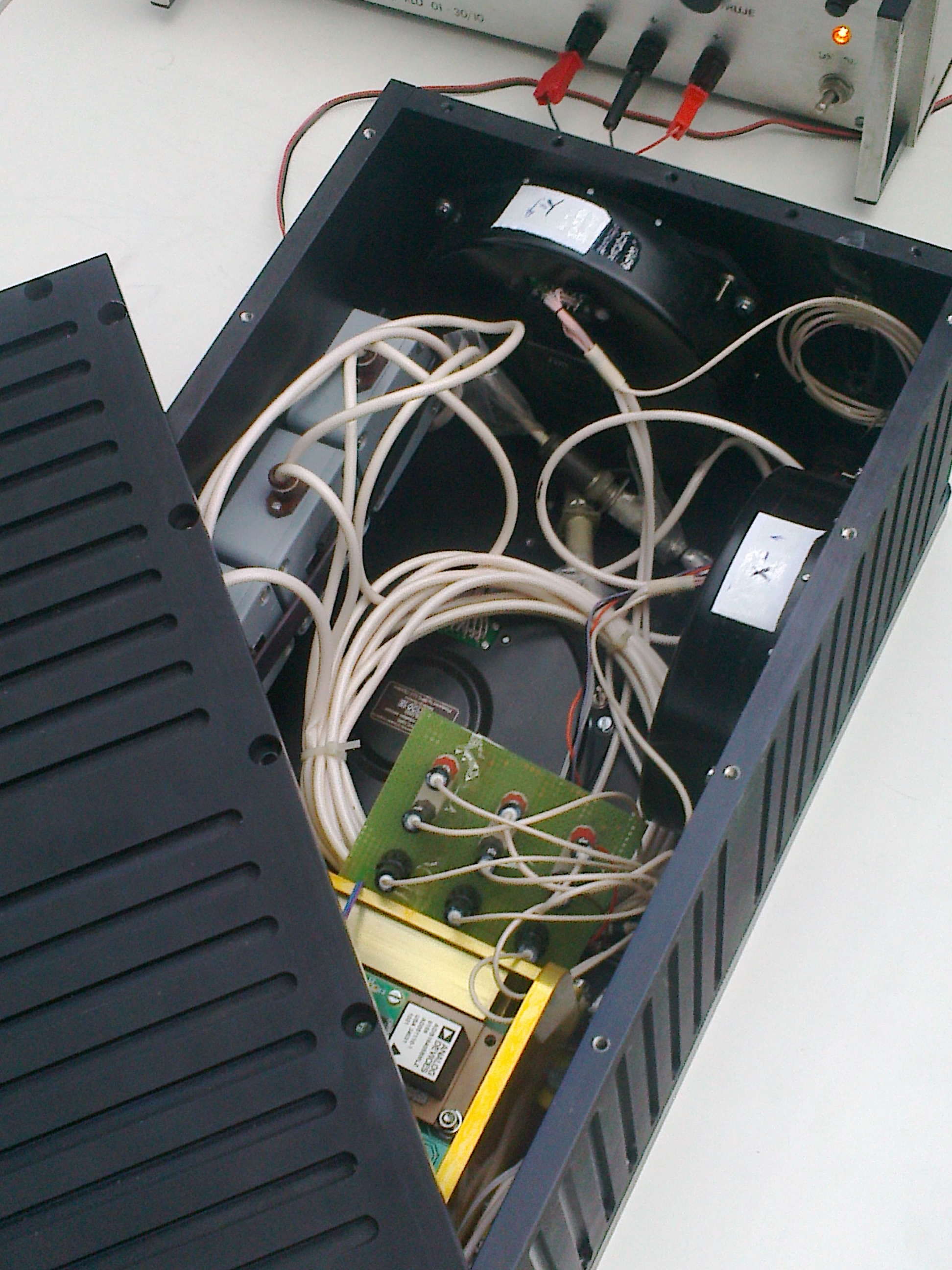
MTI inertial navigation system at Partner 2013.

Fire-control system of SORA consists of ballistic computer which can work in two modes. The first one is when howitzer is operating independently, in which case the crew has to input the firing elements, meteorological data, ammunition data... In the second case, the ballistic computer receives firing data from the command spot and sends back the condition and position of the howitzer. Ballistic computer works together with other elements of the fire-control system, such as inertial and satellite navigation, positioning and orientation subsystem....

- New ammunition

Together with the development of SORA, MTI has been working on a new range of ammunition in 122mm caliber.

- TF-462 Basic projectile with a range of 15.3 km (9.5 mi)
- TF ER BT ХМ08 Hollow-Base projectile with a range of 18.5 km (11.5 mi)
- TF ER BB ХМ09 Base-Bleed projectile with a range of 21.5 km (13.4 mi)

== Role ==
Self-propelled howitzer 122mm SORA is intended for general fire support of brigade level units. It has been designed to fulfill requirements of the modern battlefield, which means that shoot-and-scoot principle is adopted as the main mode of operation.

SORA is capable to fire in the firing cycles of 3.5 minutes. 90 seconds for switching from march to combat position, 60 seconds to fire all 6 shells in the autoloader, and another 60 seconds to move from the firing position.

== Gallery ==
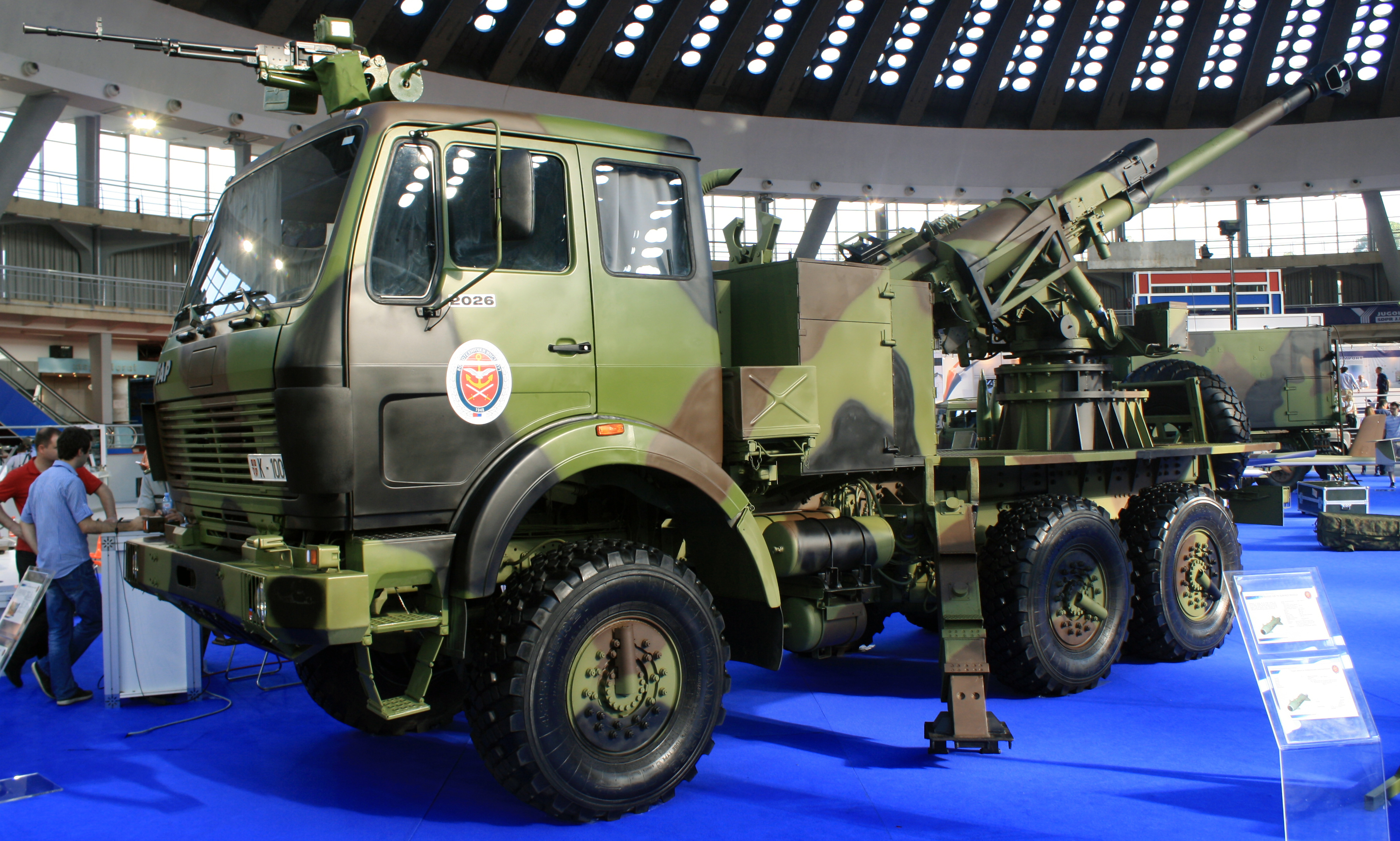
SORA self-propelled 122mm gun-howitzer on display at "Partner 2013" military fair.

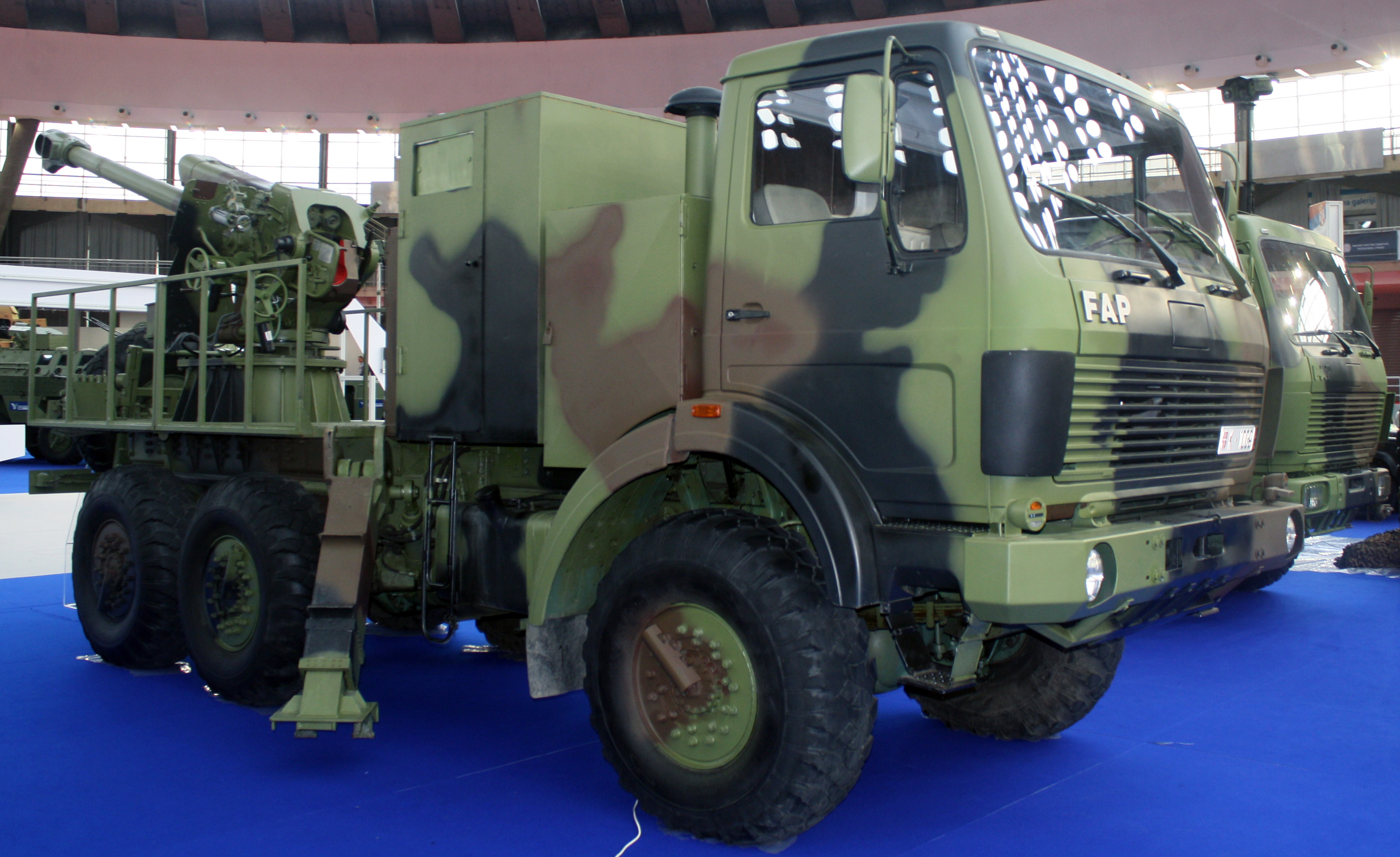
SORA self-propelled 122mm gun-howitzer on display at "Partner 2011" military fair.
