= FAP 2026 =

Serbian off-road lorry

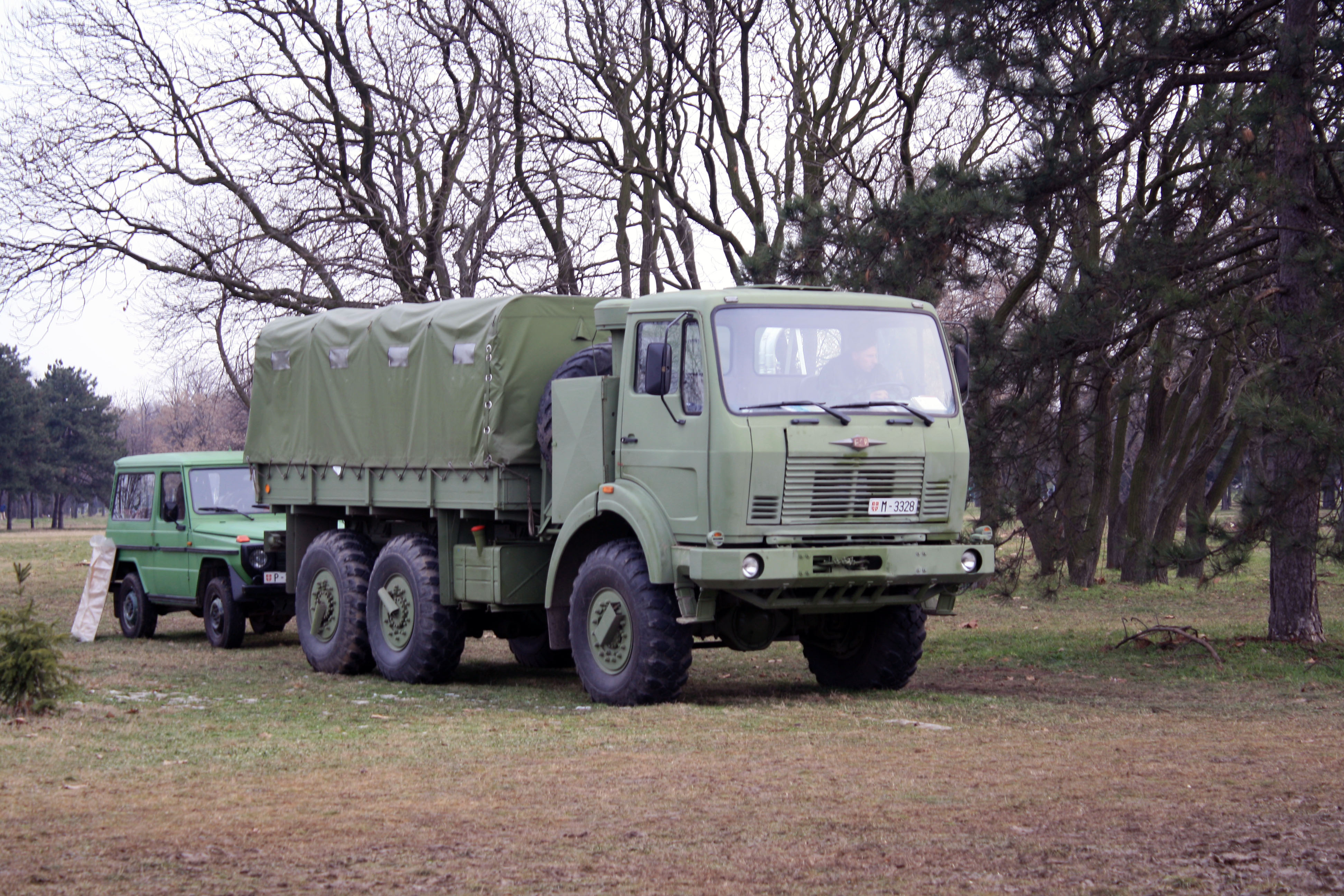

Overview
- Type: Medium tactical truck
- Manufacturer: Fabrika automobila Priboj
- Production: 1978–1994
- Designer: Military Technical Institute

Body and chassis
- Class: 6×6 Utility, Transport Truck
- Body style: COE

Powertrain
- Engine: Mercedes-Benz OM 402 V8
- Transmission: FAP MS-120, 16-speed, synchromesh
- Battery: 2 × 12 V, 143 Ah

Dimensions
- Wheelbase: 3,450 mm (135.8 in)
- Length: 7,720 mm (303.9 in)
- Width: 2,490 mm (98.0 in)
- Height: 3,100 mm (122.0 in)
- Curb weight: 11,570 kg (25,507 lb)

Chronology
- Predecessor: FAP 2220
- Successor: FAP 2228

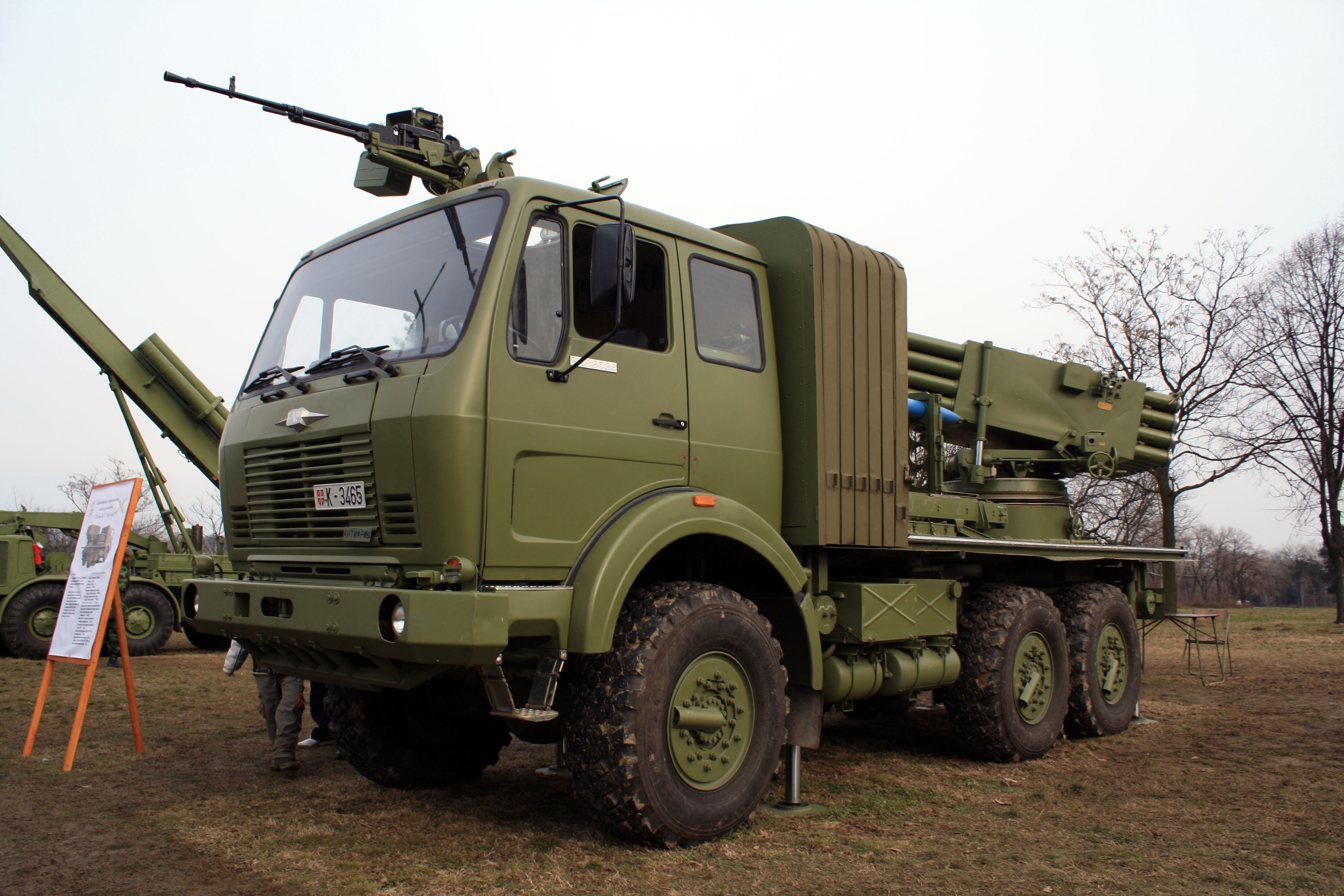
MLRS M-77 Oganj based on a FAP 2026

FAP 2026 is a general purpose off-road lorry made by Serbian vehicle manufacturer Fabrika automobila Priboj (FAP). The six-wheel drive lorry is designed for the transport of personnel, weapons and materials up to 6 t (5.9 long tons; 6.6 short tons) of total weight and for pulling weapons and trailers weighing up to 7.2 t (7.1 long tons; 7.9 short tons) for the needs of the Yugoslav People's Army.

== Development ==
In 1965, the Department for Traffic of the Federal Secretariat of People's Defense created a team tasked with analyzing armour-less vehicles used by the Yugoslav People's Army. The result of the work done by this team was extensive research on non-combat vehicles and trailers in use by the Yugoslav People's Army: it was found that there were 129 different vehicle marks composed of 320 types that were in service. A decision was made to reduce the number of vehicle marks in service by developing five vehicle classes, the first class being for 0.75 tonne 4x4 off-road vehicles. The other four classes consisted of 1.5 ton 4x4 off-road trucks, 3 ton 6x6 off-road trucks, 6 ton 6x6 off-road truck, and 9 ton 8x8 heavy off-road trucks.

During the 1970s, the 1.5 tonne 4x4 and 3 tonne 6x6 off-road trucks were constructed by TAM while the 6x6 heavy truck was developed by FAP. The first 6 tonne 6x6 military truck model developed by FAP was called the FAP 2220. It was primarily produced for transporting sections of the PM M71 pontoon bridge and the prototype series of the M-77 Oganj self-propelled rocket launcher. The new model, designated as the FAP 2026 BS/AV, was developed during the late 1970s and introduced into service in 1978. It was based on the Mercedes-Benz NG equipped with an OM 402 8-cylinder, 4-stroke, water cooled diesel engine. This was the result of FAP producing trucks under a Mercedes-Benz licence.

The FAP 2026 was mass-produced for the needs of the Yugoslav People's Army from 1978 until 1994. Several small series were produced during the 1990s after the dissolution of Yugoslavia. The FAP 2228 was then developed using the same vehicle architecture platform as the FAP 2026.

== Variant ==
The standard variant of the FAP 2026 is called the FAP 2026 BS/AV. It is complete with a short cab and standard cargo bed. The FAP 2026 BS/AV is used to transport personnel (20 + 2 troops with equipment) and materials. It is also used to carry artillery and anti-aircraft weapons.

- The FAP 2026 BDS/AVG is another variant of the FAP 2026. It is used with the PM M71 Floating Bridge as trucks for towing tugboats. The FAP 2026 BDS/AVG has a longer cab complete with a cargo bed.
- The FAP 2026 BDS/A is a variant of the FAP 2026 with a longer cab. It is used as the template for other vehicles that carry out different military applications. A few examples of as transport trucks that carry sections of floating bridges (e.g. of transporting transportation of the PM M71 Floating Bridge sections, M-77 Oganj self-propelled multiple rocket launcher, mounting of M-85 Žirafa mobile radar and fire truck.

The standard FAP 2026 BS/AV was used also as platform for well drill (BMB) and SORA 122 mm (4.8 in) self-propelled howitzer.

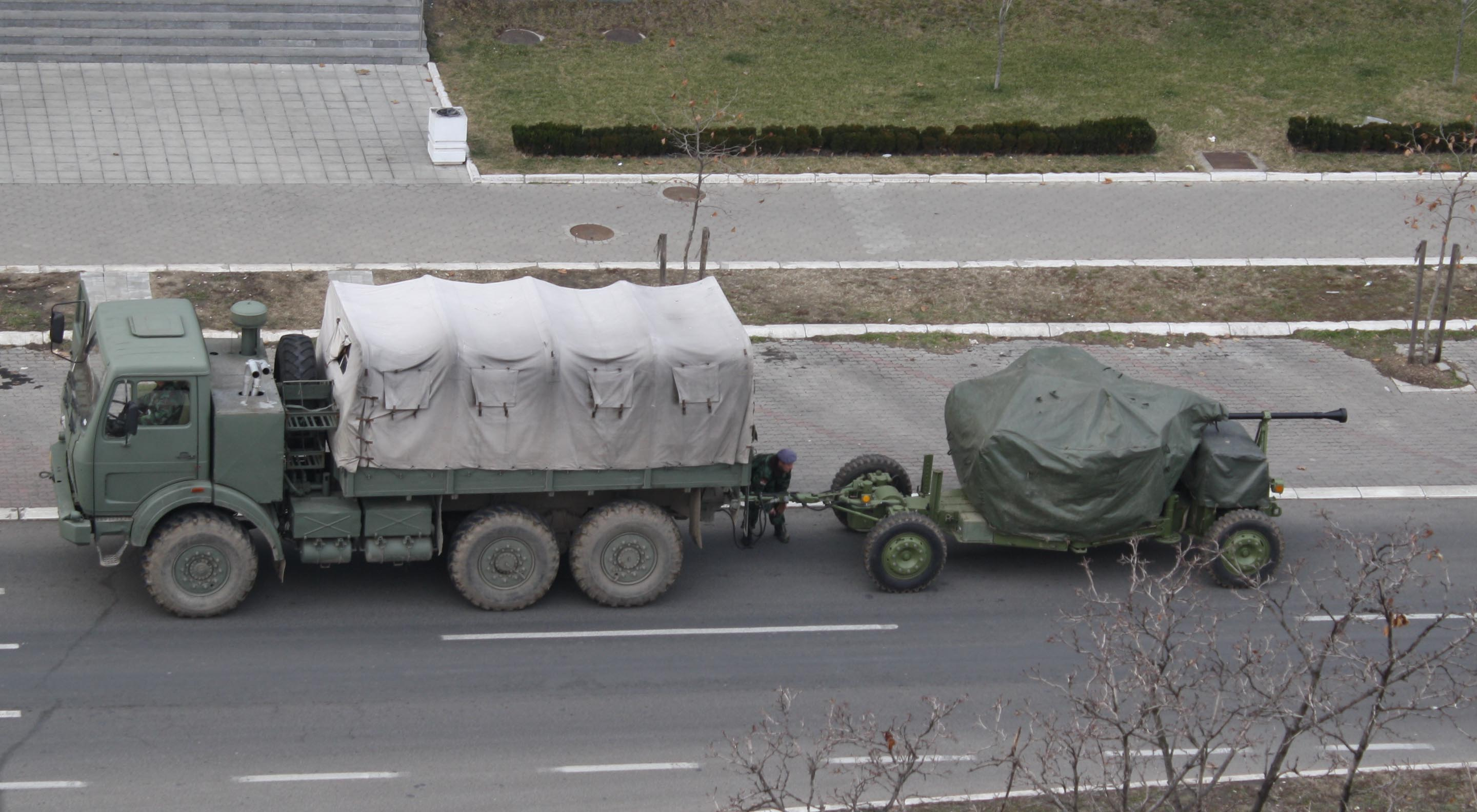
FAP 2026 BS/AV towing Bofors L/70 40 mm anti-aircraft gun

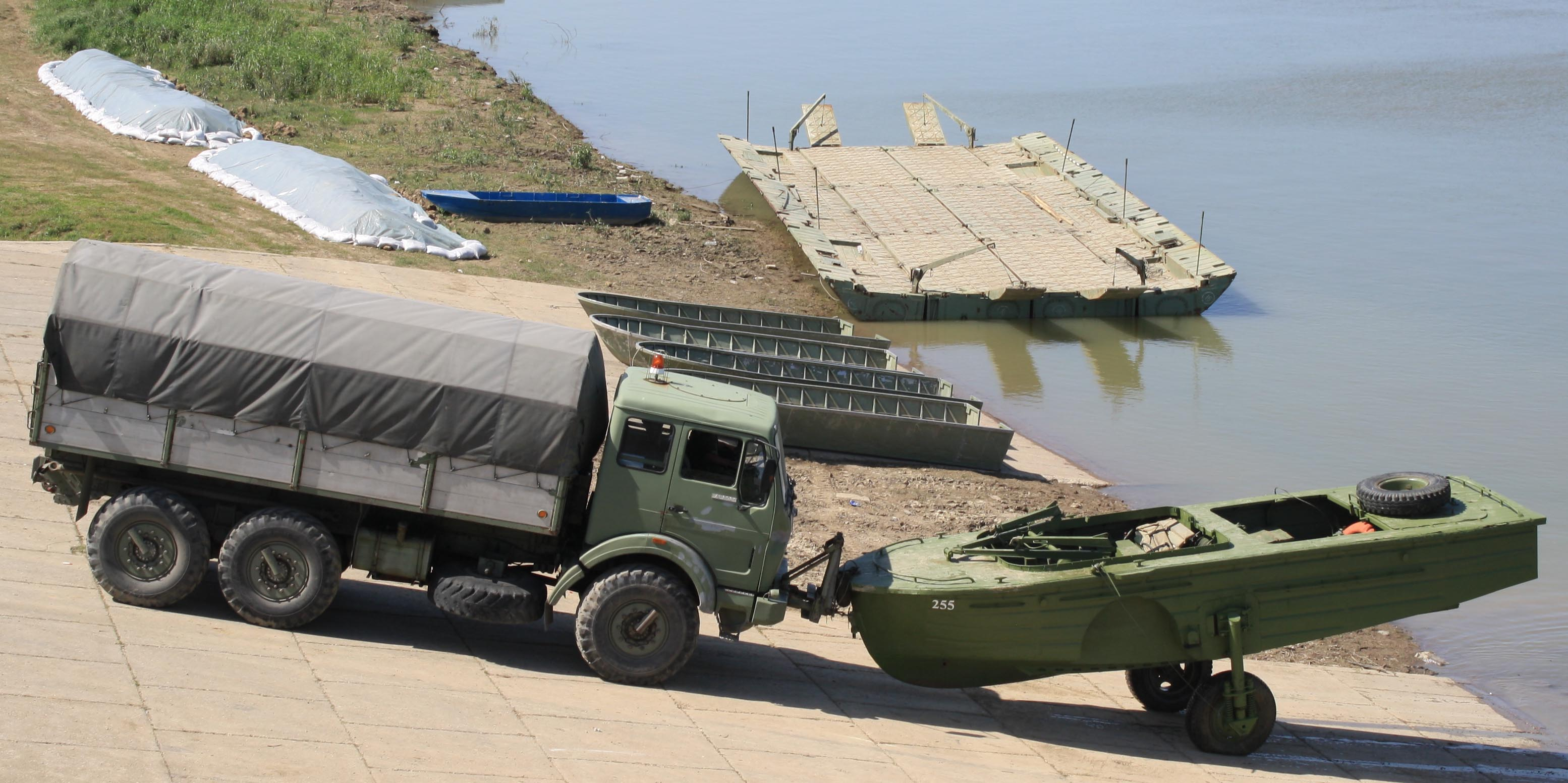
FAP 2026 BDS/AVG towing RPP M68 tugboat out from river

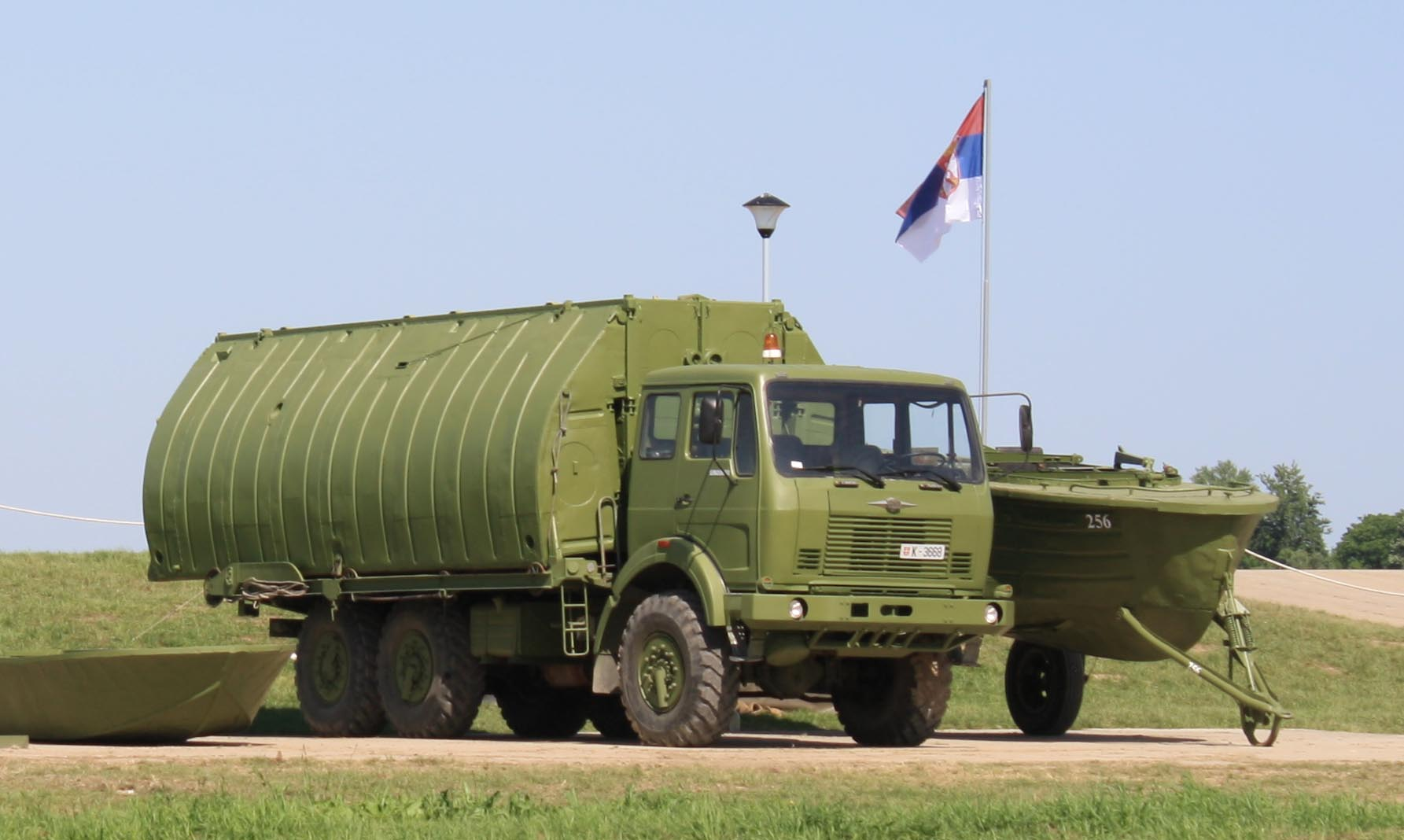
FAP 2026 BDS/A with PM M71 sections

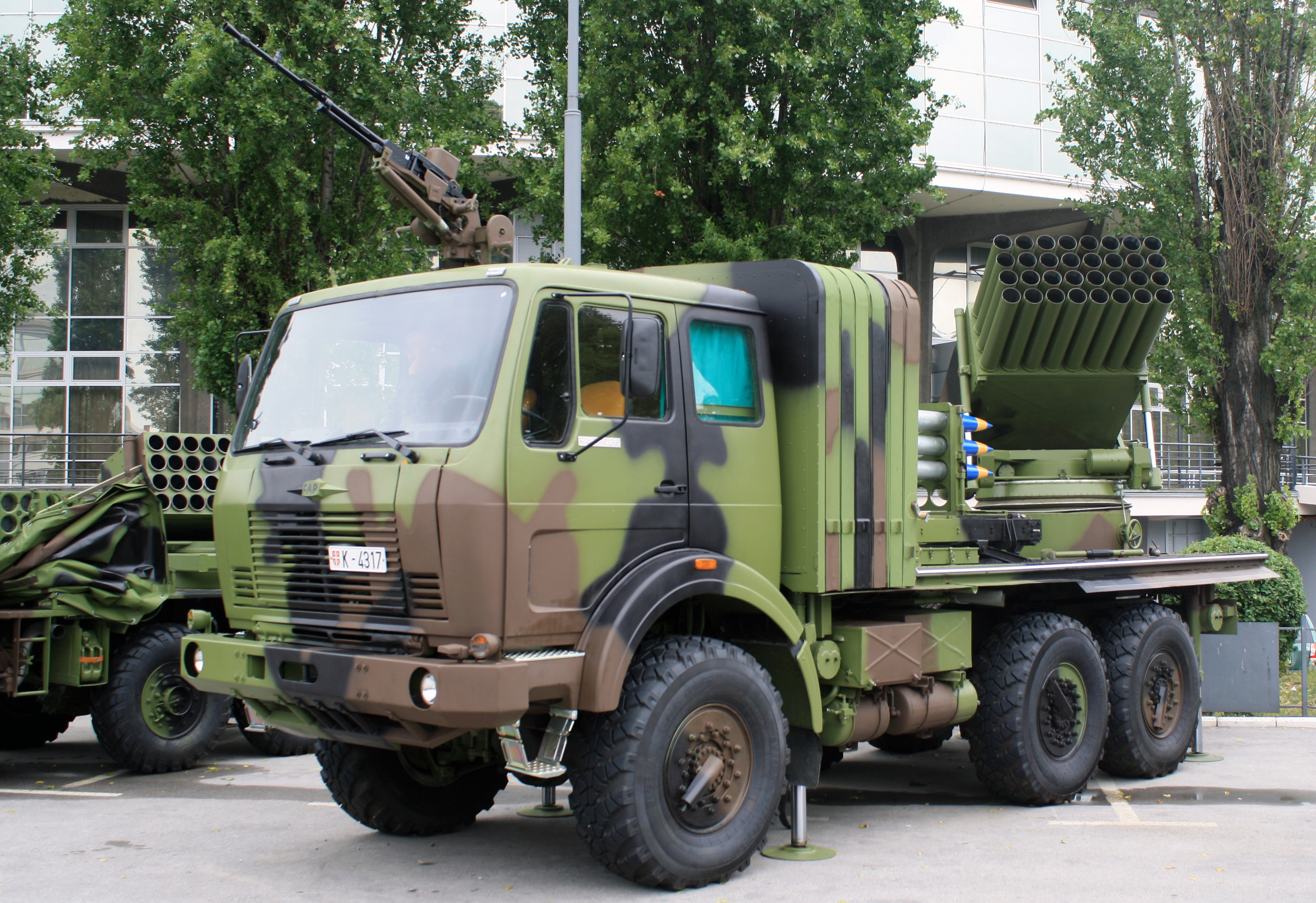
M-77 Oganj multiple rocket launcher mounted on FAP 2026 BDS/A

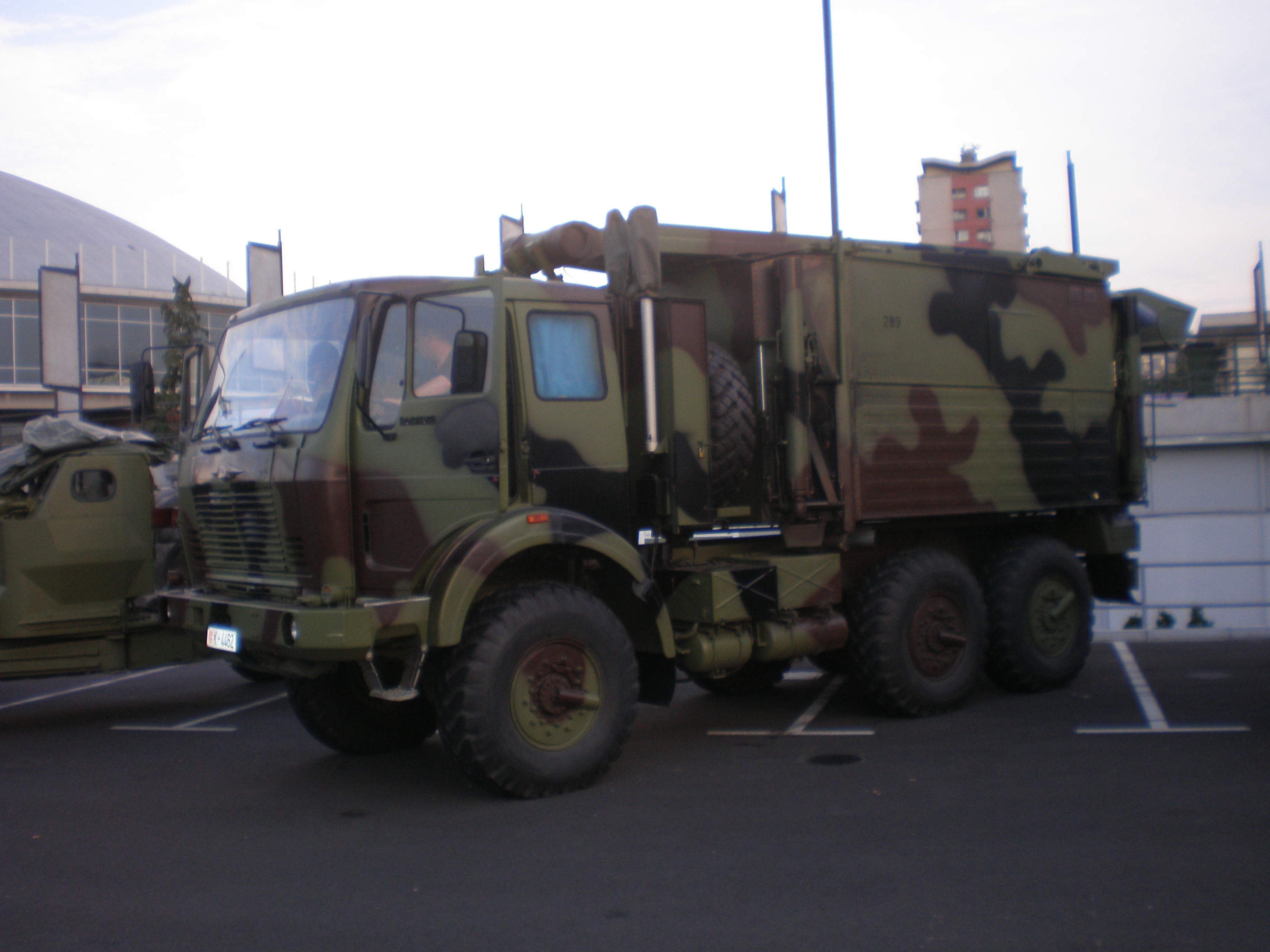
M-85 Žirafa (Giraffe) mobile radar

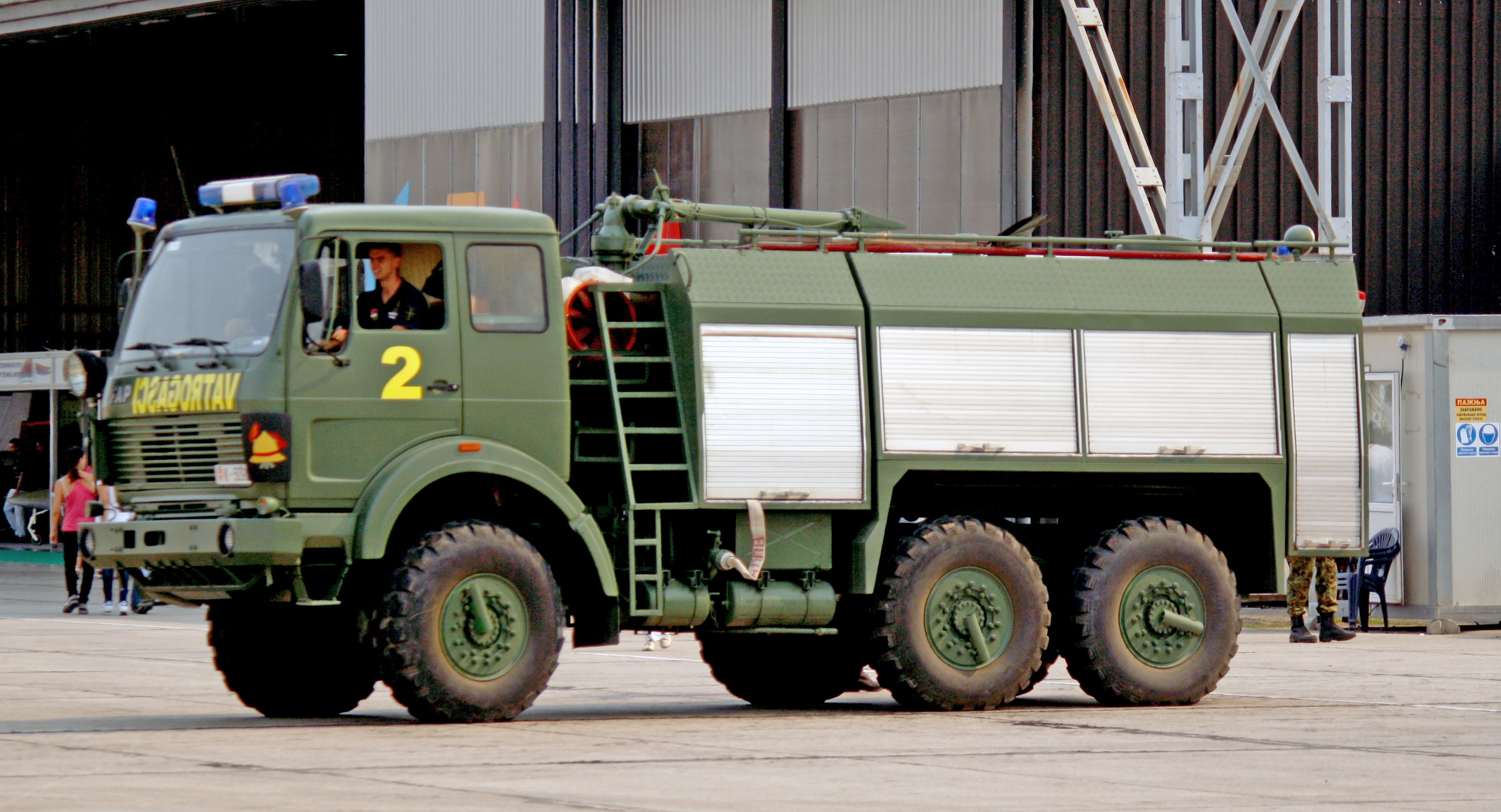
FAP 2026 BDS/A fire truck

== Technical data ==
=== Engine ===
- Engine type: Mercedes-Benz OM 402, naturally aspirated V8 diesel
- Bore/Stroke (mm): 102/130
- Displacement (cm^{3}): 6,370
- Output power (kW/HP): 205/279
- At speeds (rpm): 2,200
- Max. torque (N⋅m): 1,100 at speeds (rpm) 1,200-1,600

=== Gearbox ===
- Gearbox type: 16MS-120, 16-speed, synchromesh
- Rated inlet torque (N⋅m): 1200
- Forward gear transmission ratios: 13.68; 11.64; 9.4; 8.0; 6.73; 5.73; 4.79; 4.07; 3.36; 2.89; 2.31; 1.96; 1.65; 1.41; 1.18; 1.0
- Reverse gear transmission ratios: 11.06; 9.41
- Total transmission ratio: 9.4

=== Power take-off (PTO) ===
- PTO model: PP 80 / 3C
- PTO application for winch drive is available

=== Timing gear ===
- Timing gear type: mechanical

=== Differentials ===
- No. of differentials: 1

=== Axles ===
- No. of axles: 3

=== Gear ratios ===
- No. of gear ratios: 2
- On-road gear ratio (direct) 1 : 1
- Off-road gear ratio (reduced) 1 : 1.6

=== Propeller shafts ===
- Propeller shaft type: tubular and open with universal joints (needle bearings in joints)
- Complete with protected telescopic connection
- Does not have bearings.

=== Drive axles ===
- Drive axle type: Banjo with fully unloaded axle shafts, steering front axle

=== Cab ===
- Cab type: short tipping
- Built with construction metal
- Number of seats: 2
- Single piece driver's seat
- Cab insulation made on the internal side with special insulation of the bonnet on the lower side
- Ventilation wing window on doors and roof opening
- Heating by hot air from engine through heater and fan
- Electric wipers

=== Winch ===
- Type with warm reducer and hydraulic power transfer
- Rope total length: 86 m (282 ft), ø 16 mm (0.63 in)
- Towing force on first drum winding: 100.000 N +/- 10%

=== Wheels and tires ===
- No. of wheels 6+1 spare (2 in front, 4 at rear)
- Type of wheel 2-part with flat rim
- Rim size 11.25 - 21
- Tire type 15.00 - 21, special construction with pressure regulation dependent on terrain

=== Equipment ===
- The vehicle is equipped with a set of tools, accessories, and spare parts.

=== Electric equipment ===
- Rated voltage 24 V Two batteries, capacity 143 Ah
- Generator alternator with full radio interference, waterproof, rated power 28 V, 85 A, positioned on the engine right side
- Alternator regulator with full radio interference, 28V
- Electric starter waterproof, 24V, of 4.8 kW (6.4 hp).

== Operators ==
- Croatia
- Serbia
- Syria

=== Former operators ===
- Yugoslavia: Passed onto successor states.
