= LRSVM Morava =

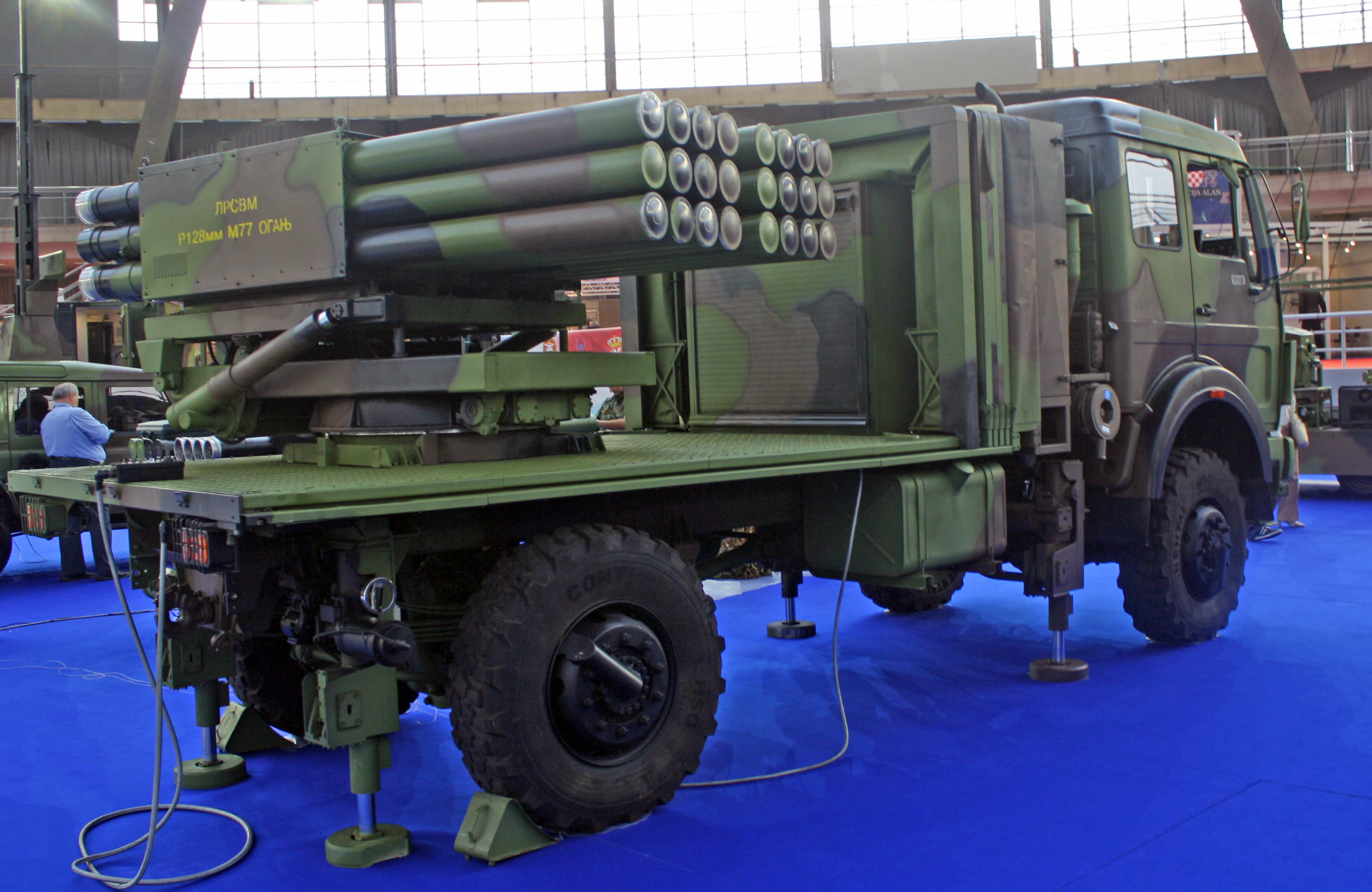
- LRSVM Morava with Oganj missile at 2011 Partner military fair
- Type: Multiple rocket launcher
- Place of origin: Serbia

Service history
- In service: 2014
- Used by: Libyan National Army

Production history
- Designer: Military Technical Institute
- Designed: 2011
- Manufacturer: 14. oktobar
- No. built: 31 (+2 prototypes)

Specifications
- Crew: 3
- Caliber: 107mm/122mm/128mm
- Barrels: 2 containers with 12-16 barrels depending on caliber
- Action: 45s preparing for action 30s for changing position after firing
- Traverse: 360
- Maximum firing range: 52 km with extended range 122mm rocket
- Main armament: Plamen A, Plamen B, OGANJ, GRAD, G-2000 rockets
- Engine: MB OM 904 LA EU3 diesel 174 hp
- Suspension: 4x4 wheeled
- Operational range: 1000 km
- Maximum speed: 80 km/h

The LRSVM Morava (Serbian: Лансер Ракета Самоходни Вишецевни Модуларни (ЛРСВМ) Морава, romanized: Lanser Raketa Samohodni Višecevni Modularni (LRSVM) Morava, named for the Morava river in Serbia) is a modular, multi-calibre, multi-pod self-propelled multiple rocket launcher designed and developed by the Serbian Military Technical Institute. The system is designed to offer subsystem modularity, enabling integration with wheeled or tracked platforms to fire unguided rockets of various calibres to engage targets at ranges between 8 km and 40 km.

As of 2019, the system is in service with the Serbian Armed Forces on a FAP 1118 4x4 cross-country truck and with the United Arab Emirates (UAE) on a Nimr 6×6 chassis.

== Development ==
Development of the LRSVM Morava began in early 2010, and it was displayed for the first time at the Partner 2011 military exhibition in Belgrade. The development of the project aimed to create a single platform able to mount various existing rockets of different calibres and warheads to replace the current generation of Russian BM-21 Grad and Serbian M-77 Oganj and M-63 Plamen within the Serbian Armed Forces. Overall design and development of the Morava was conducted by the Military Technical Institute (VTI), while the launcher was assigned to the 14. oktobar company, which built the prototype launcher and is expected to conduct the planned serial production. Rocket containers for the Morava were designed and produced by INhrom from Čačak .

The same technology developed for LRSVM Morava is now used to modernize existing M-77 Oganj and to produce new M18 Oganj multiple rocket launchers with increased capabilities.

== Design ==
The system is based on a modified FAP 1118 4x4 military truck that provides good tactical mobility. It is equipped with a double container with 12–16 launching tubes, which can fire all current Plamen, Oganj and Grad rockets, including HE-FRAG, incendiary, thermobaric, cluster with anti-personnel or anti-tank mines. It is possible to combine two different modules for example one container with Plamen A and one container with Grad rockets giving a unique capabilities of attacking close and ranged targets in the same time.

The range and direction correction system provides better accuracy with respect to its predecessors. The Morava can launch single rocket, partial ripple or full salvo, which can cover an area of 32 hectares. The LRSVM is equipped with fully automatic targeting control systems. The launch vehicle is fitted with an Inertial Navigation System (INS), GPS unit and absolute encoders for automatic positioning. Vehicle has ballistic computer with automatic or manual data input and firing elements computation. Rockets are launched directly form the cab or remotely form the vehicle. The LRSVM can fire single rockets or full salvo. A crew of three prepares this artillery system for firing within 45 seconds. It leaves firing position within 30 seconds.

The launch vehicle is reloaded within 5 minutes and a full salvo duration is 15-25 seconds depending on the rocket type.

While traveling the rocket launcher is covered by hydraulically operated canvas cover (first such camouflage world implementation was on M-77 Oganj), which makes it hard to recognize, as vehicle looks like an ordinary light utility truck. Also it protects the launcher from adverse weather effects.

An export version of the system is available on the FAP 1318 platform.

== Rockets ==
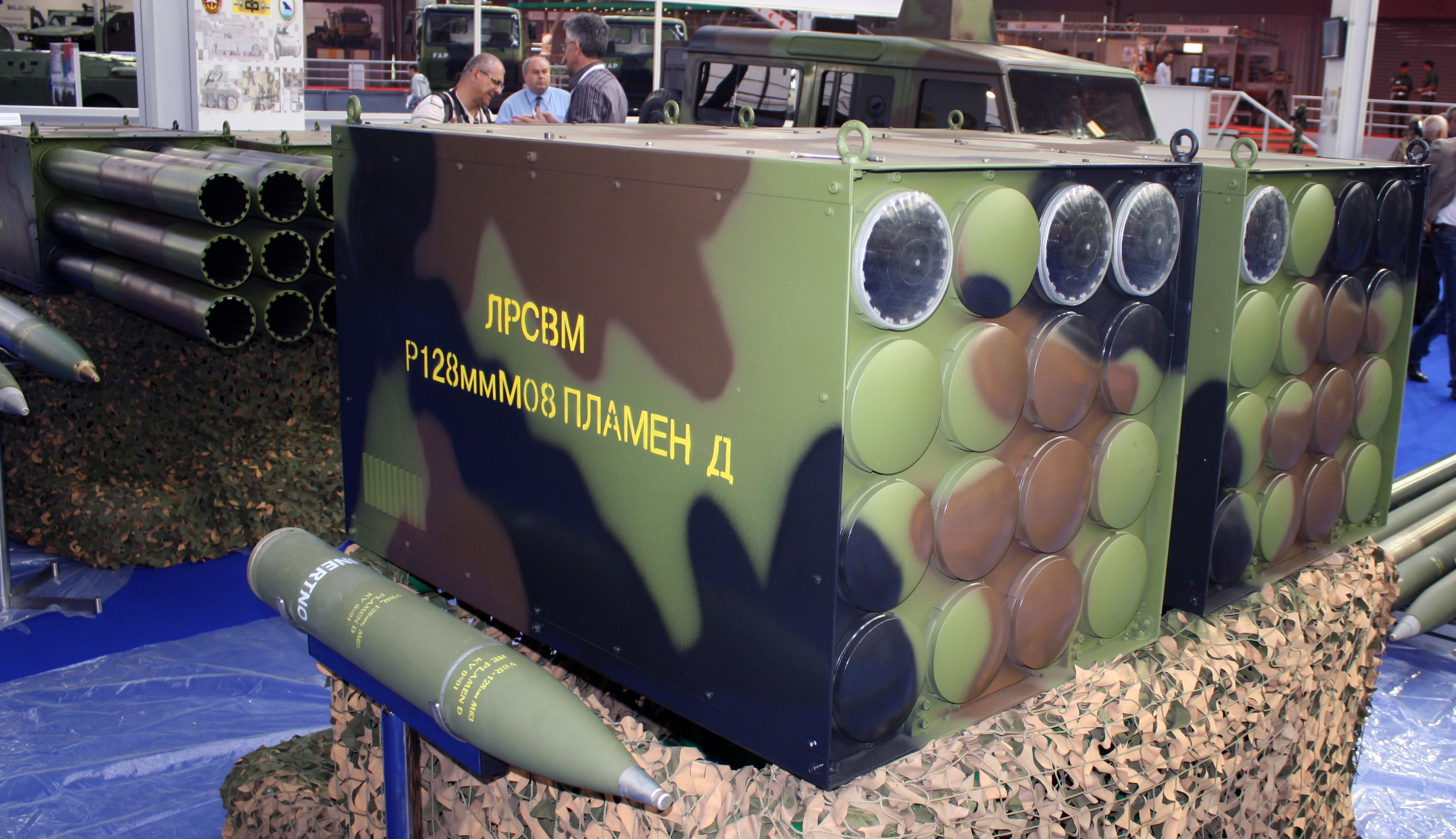
Plamen-D 128mm rocket with improved range next to its modular container for LRSVM Morava.

There are several domestic models of rockets, within models there are several types (different warheads and fuses for example) and there are also possibilities to use all models of Grad 122mm rockets from manufactures worldwide. New model of Oganj rocket with extended range of 30 km which uses inertial guidance firing controller to achieve better CEP is ready to go in production. There is also in final stage of development new 50 km range rocket.

Rocket	Number of tubes in launch container	Maximum Range	Rocket caliber
Model	Per container	Km	mm
Plamen A	16	8.6	128
Plamen D	16	12.6	128
Oganj M77	12	22.5	128
Oganj ER	12	50	128
Grad	12	35	122
G-2000	12	40	122
Edepro G2000/52	12	52	122
Edepro - Krušik Valjevo 107	25	11	107

== Operators ==
- Libya - donated to the Libyan National Army by the United Arab Emirates in 2020.
- United Arab Emirates - around 31 systems ordered in 2015.

== Gallery ==
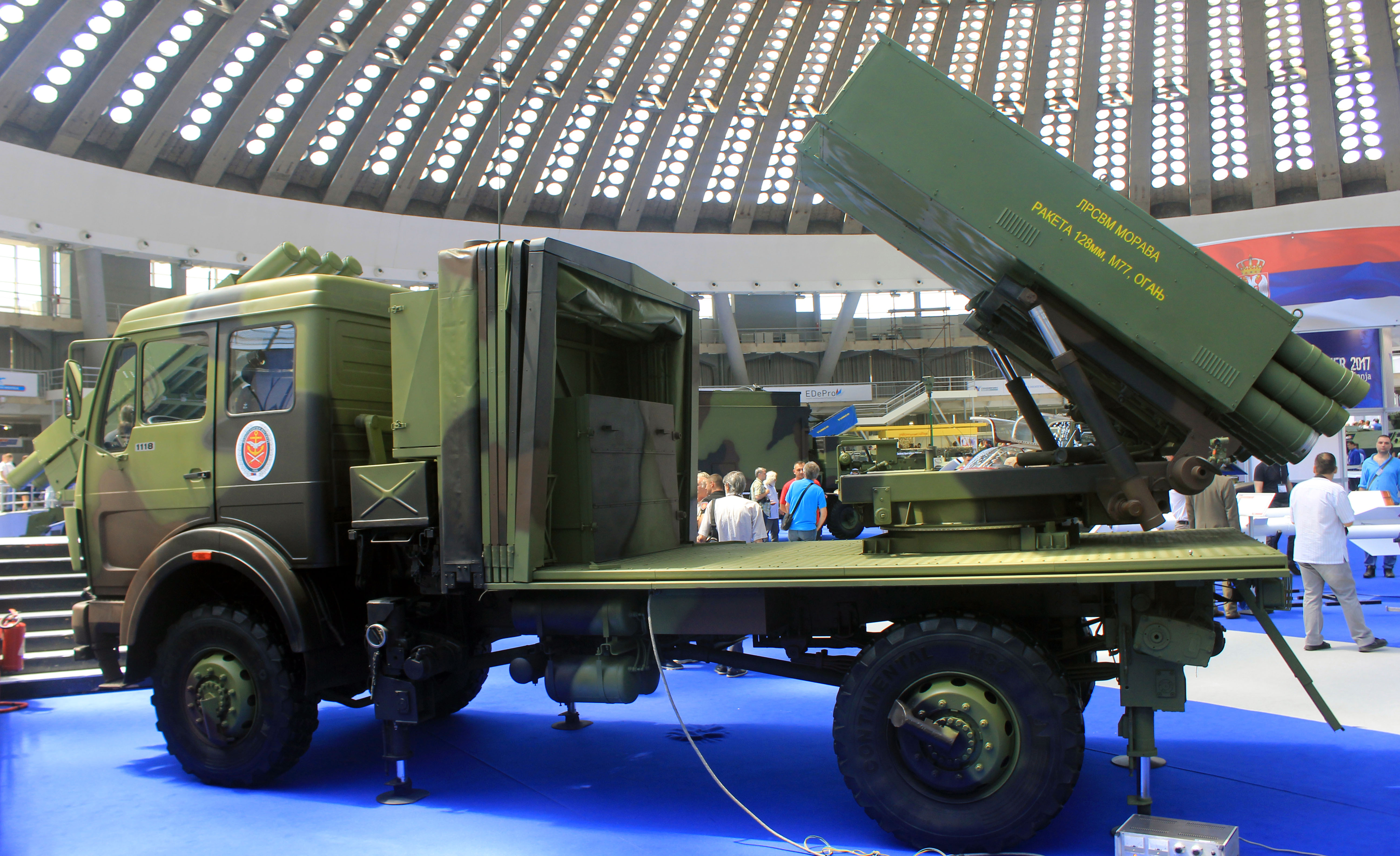
Oganj 128mm container

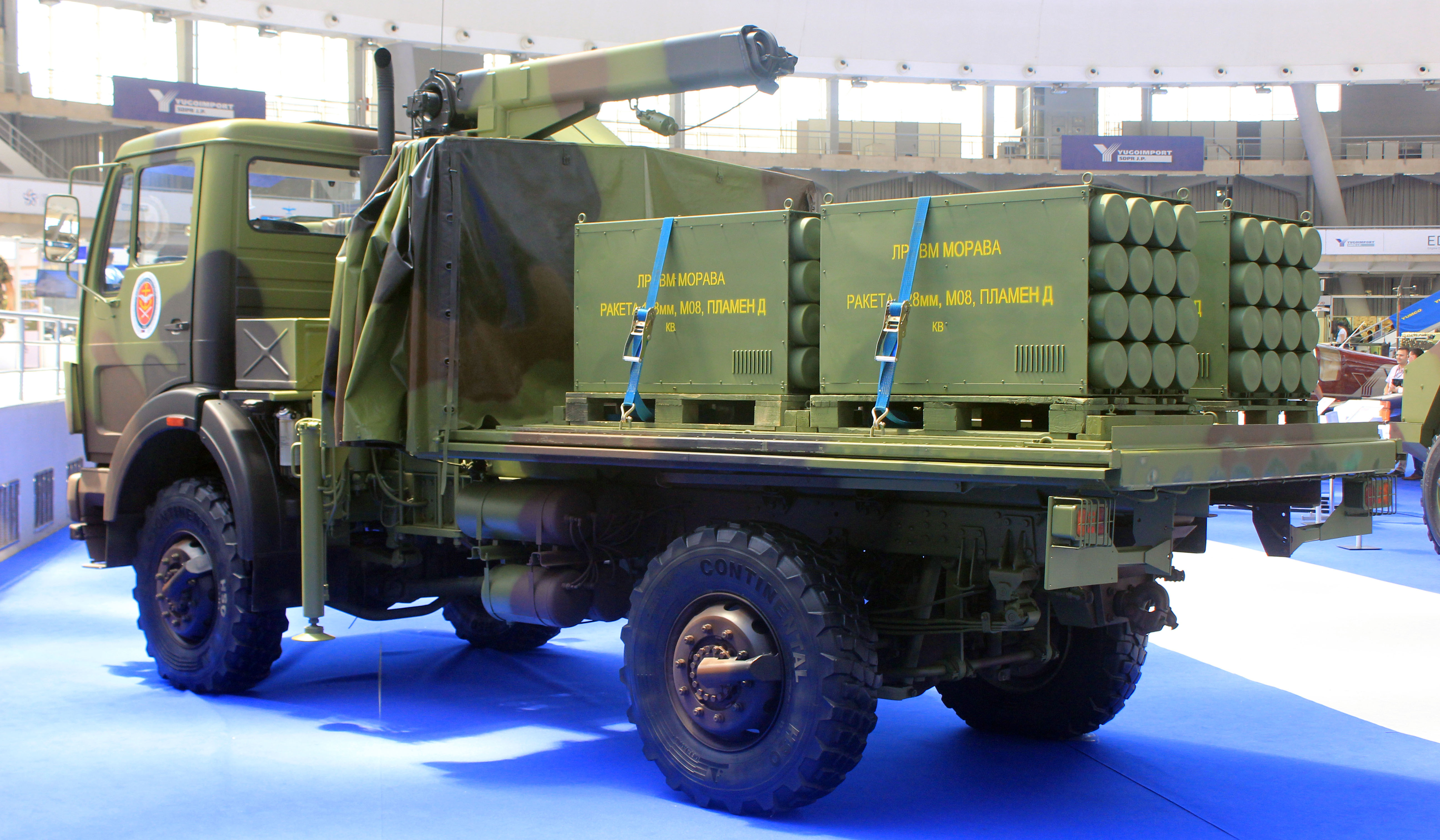
Logistic vehicle for reload

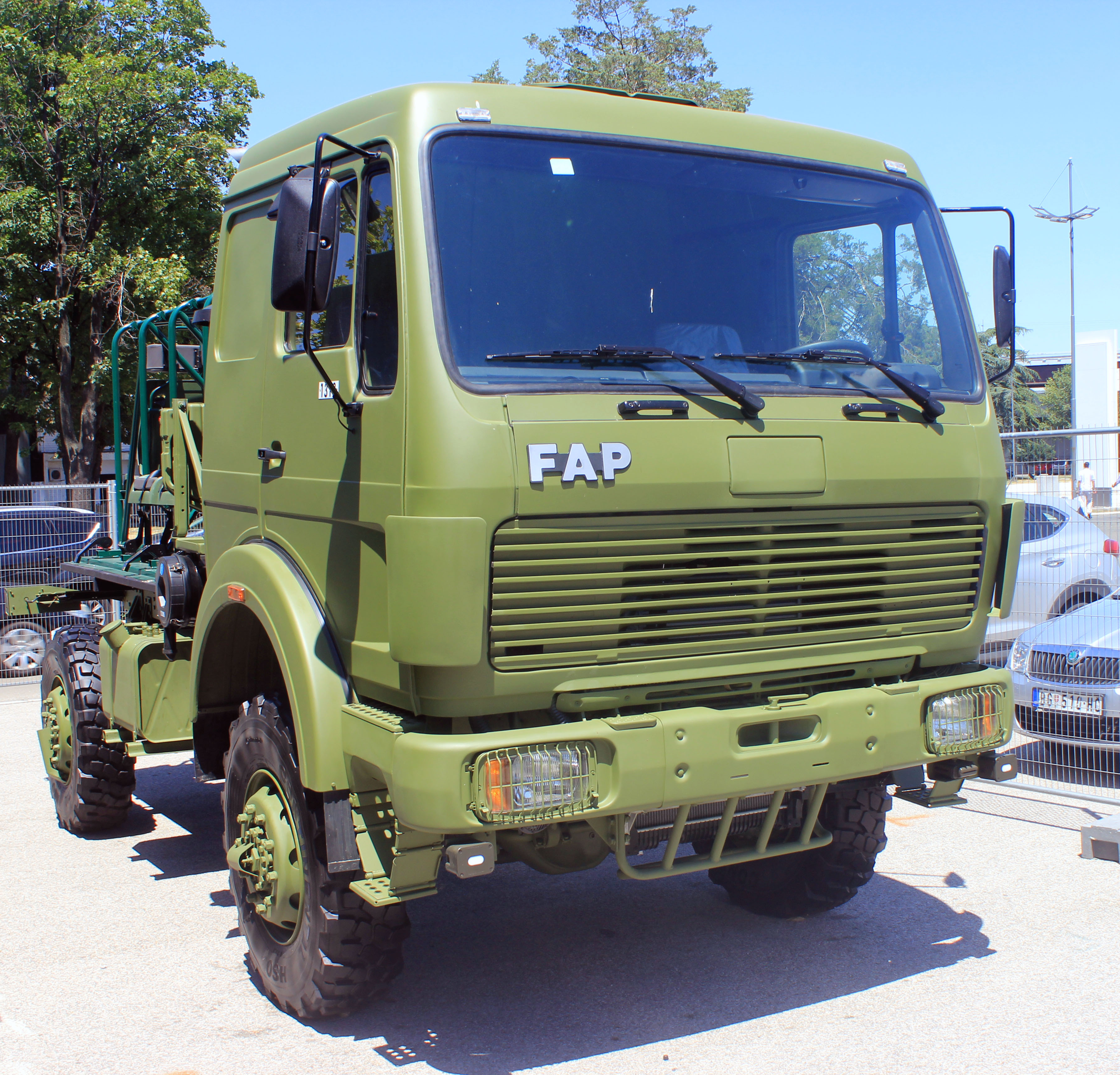
FAP 1318 for export version

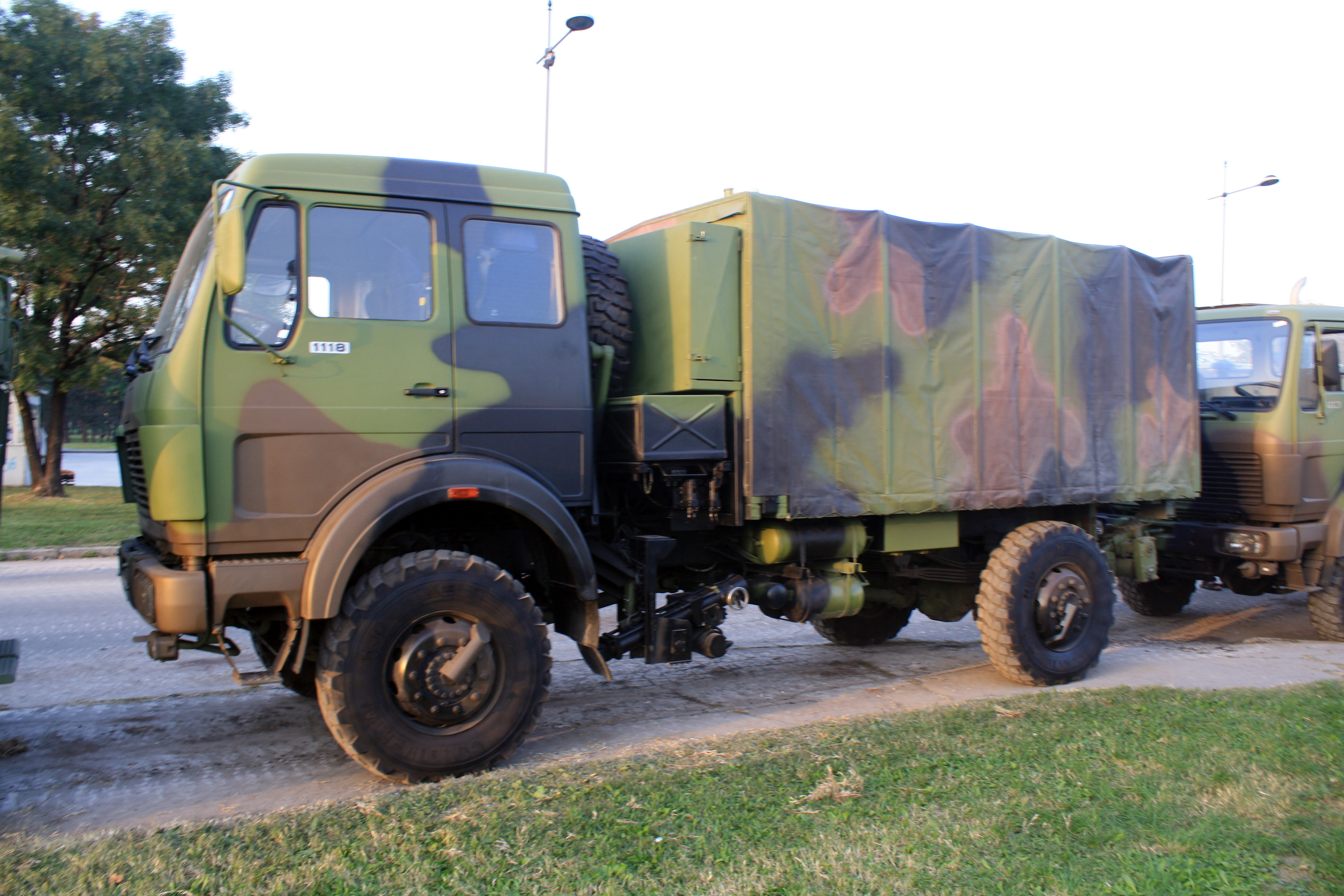
Canvas cover for camouflage applied

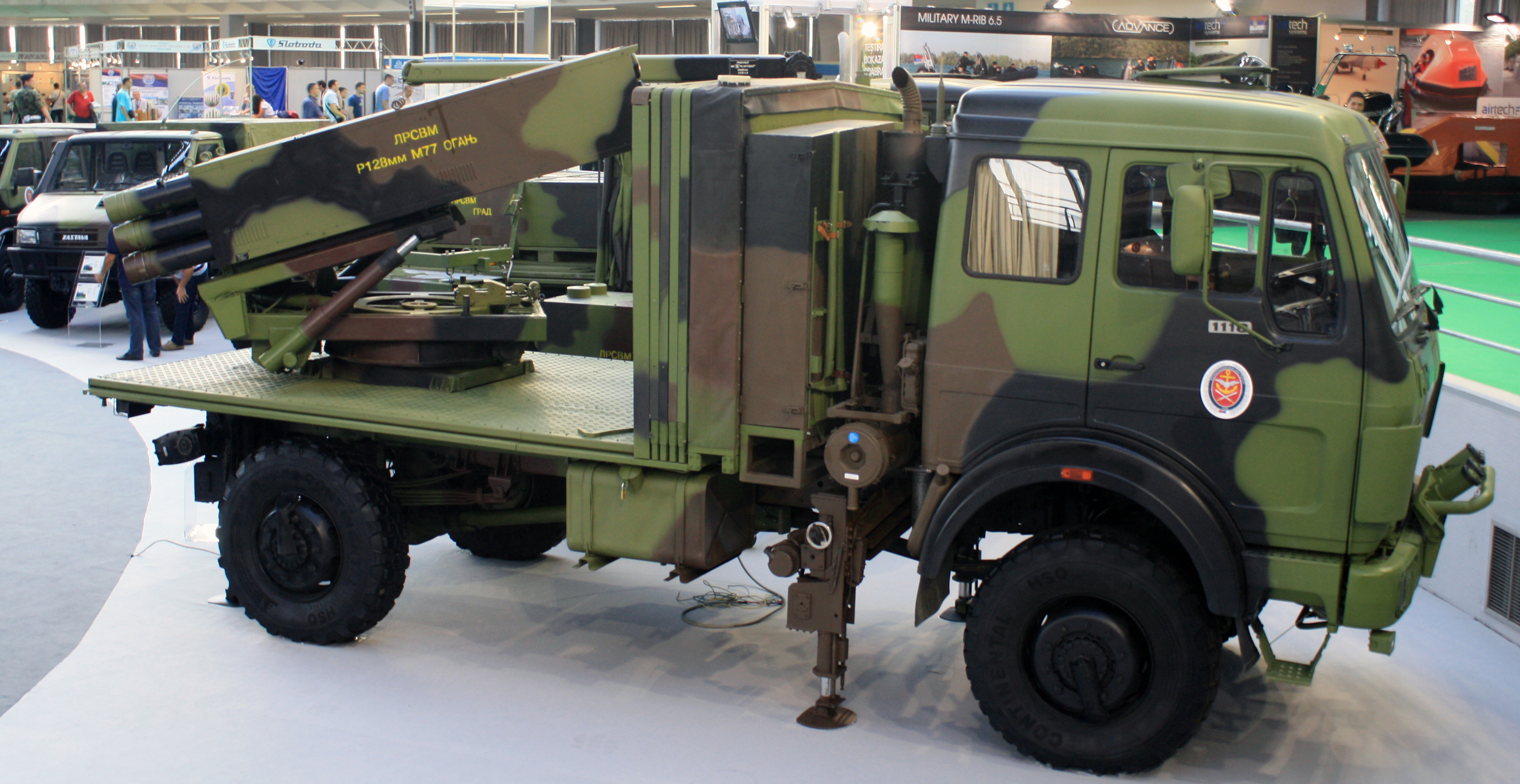

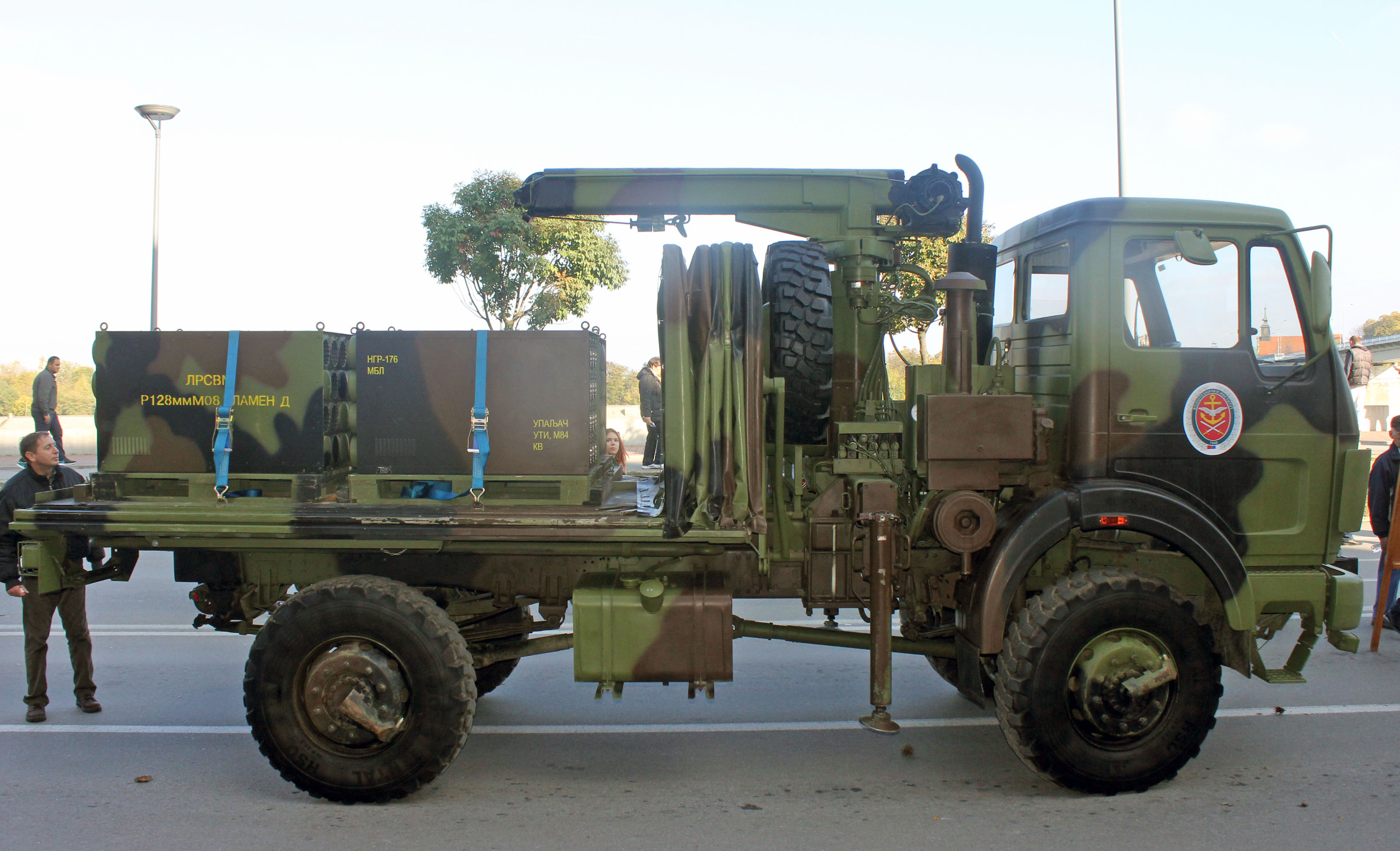

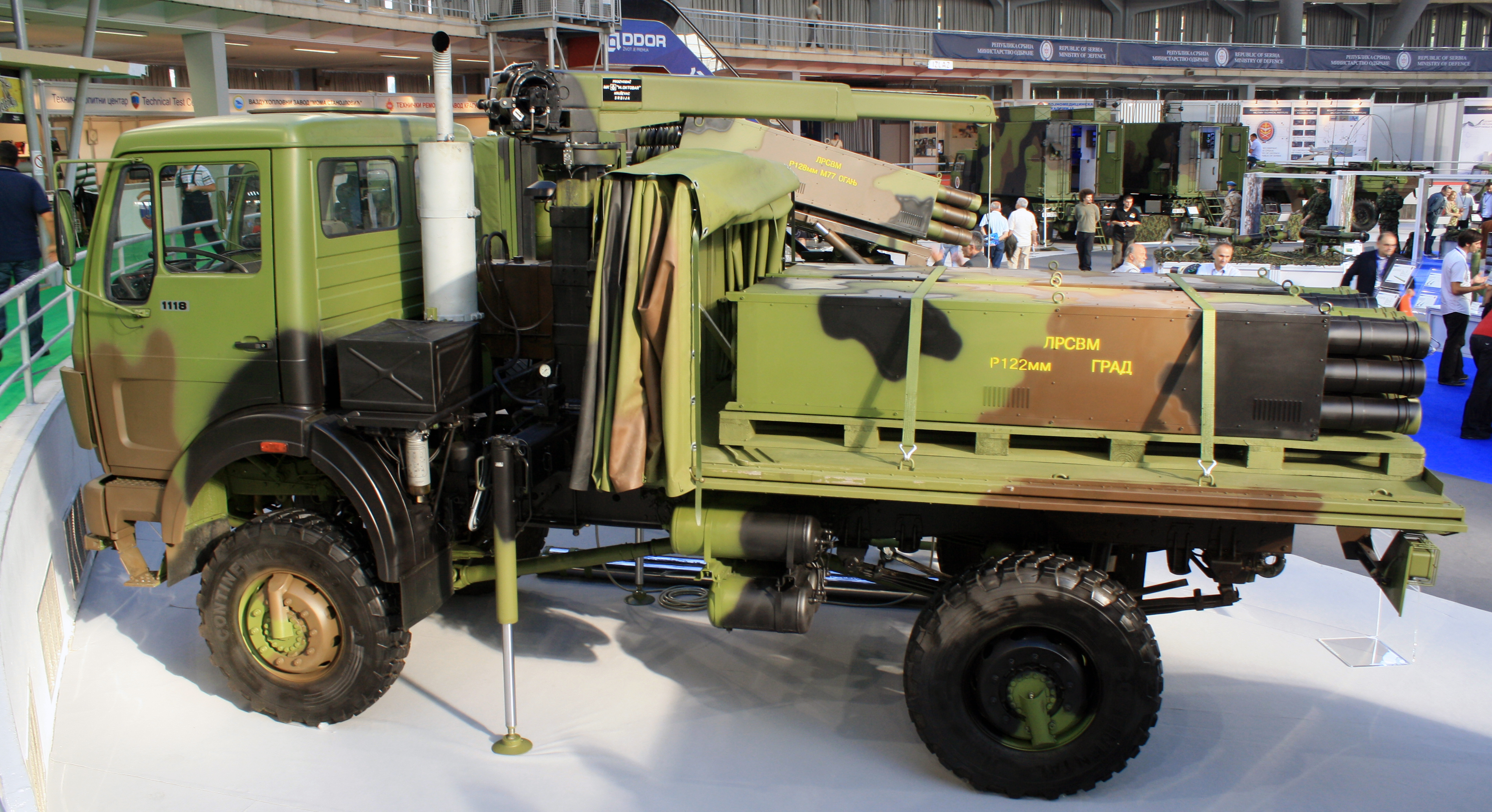

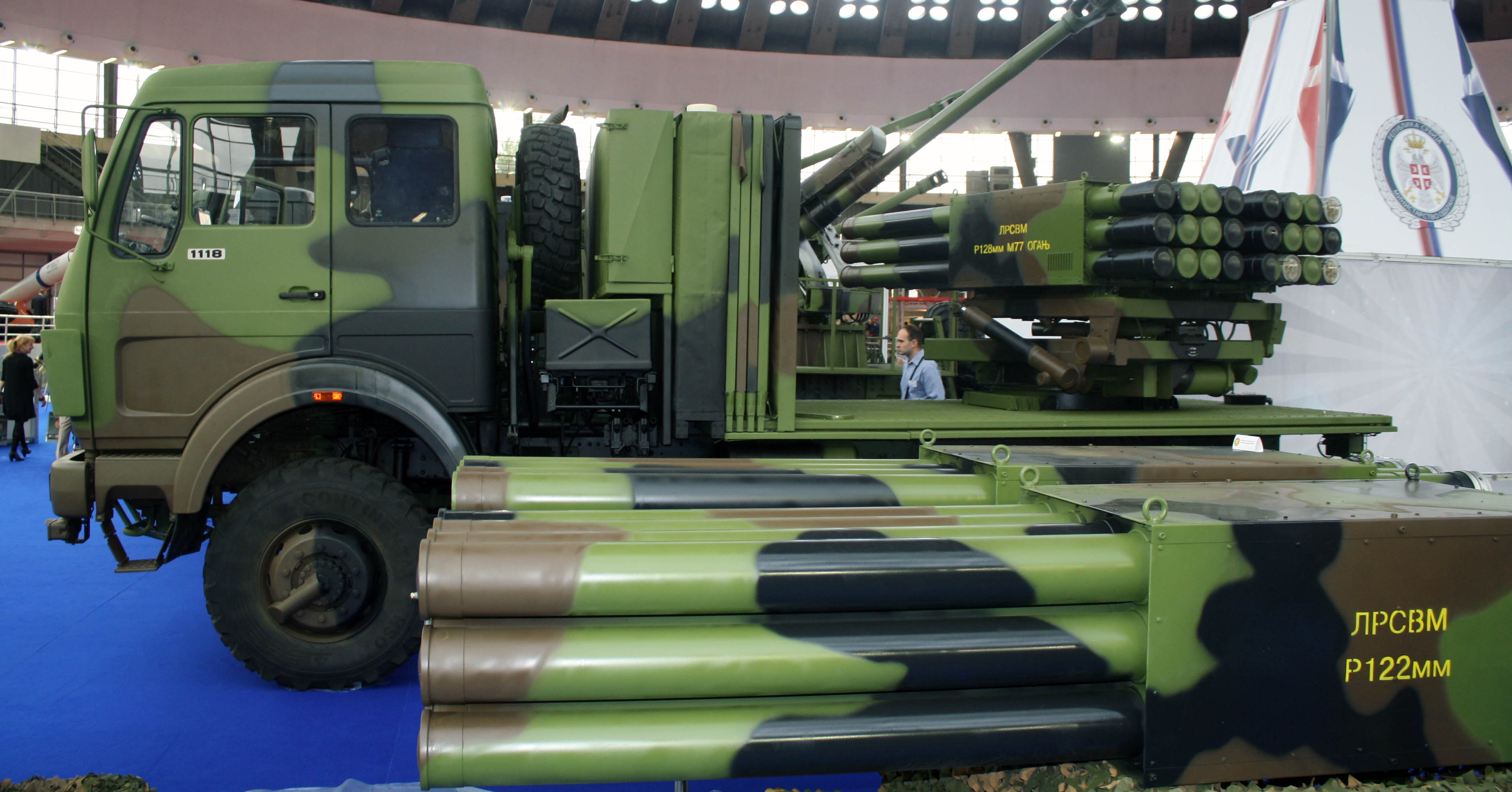
New Serbian Modular multiple rocket launcher (LRSVM) which can fire various rockets as 128mm Oganj (mounted on truck on picture), 122mm Grad (container in front of truck on picture) and 128mm Plamen. System is mounted on new FAP 1118 truck. "Partner 2011" military fair.

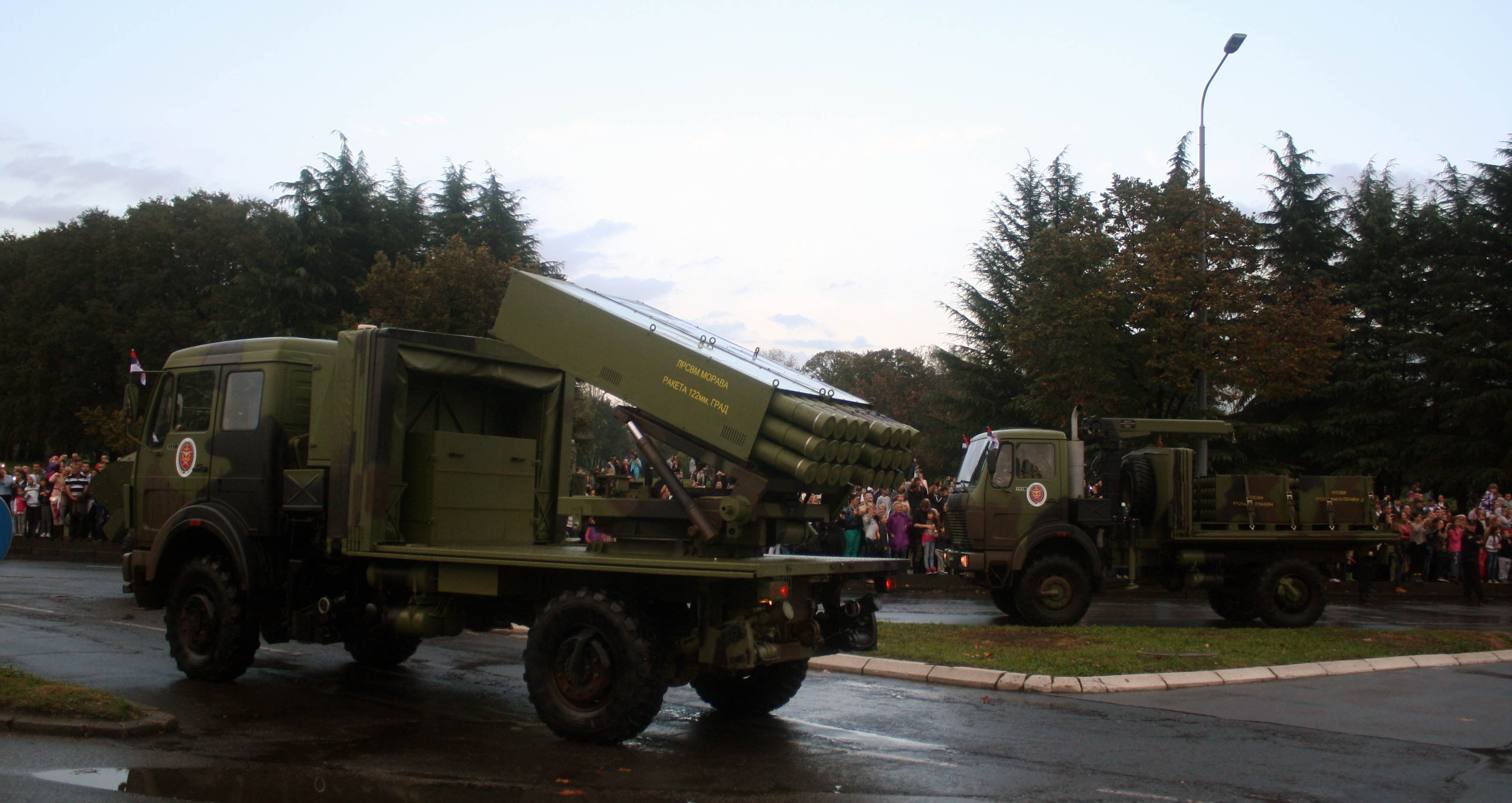
LRSVM Morava during the military parade "March of the Victorious", Belgrade.

== See also ==
- BM-14 – (Soviet Union) 140 mm multiple rocket launcher
- BM-21 Grad – (Soviet Union) 122 mm multiple rocket launcher
- 9A52-4 Tornado – (Russia)
- LAR-160 – (Israel)
- T-122 Sakarya – (Turkey)
- Fajr-5 – (Iran)
- M-63 Plamen – (Socialist Federal Republic of Yugoslavia)
- M-77 Oganj – (Yugoslavia)
- M-87 Orkan – (Yugoslavia)
