= M-63 Plamen =

Yugoslav multiple rocket launcher

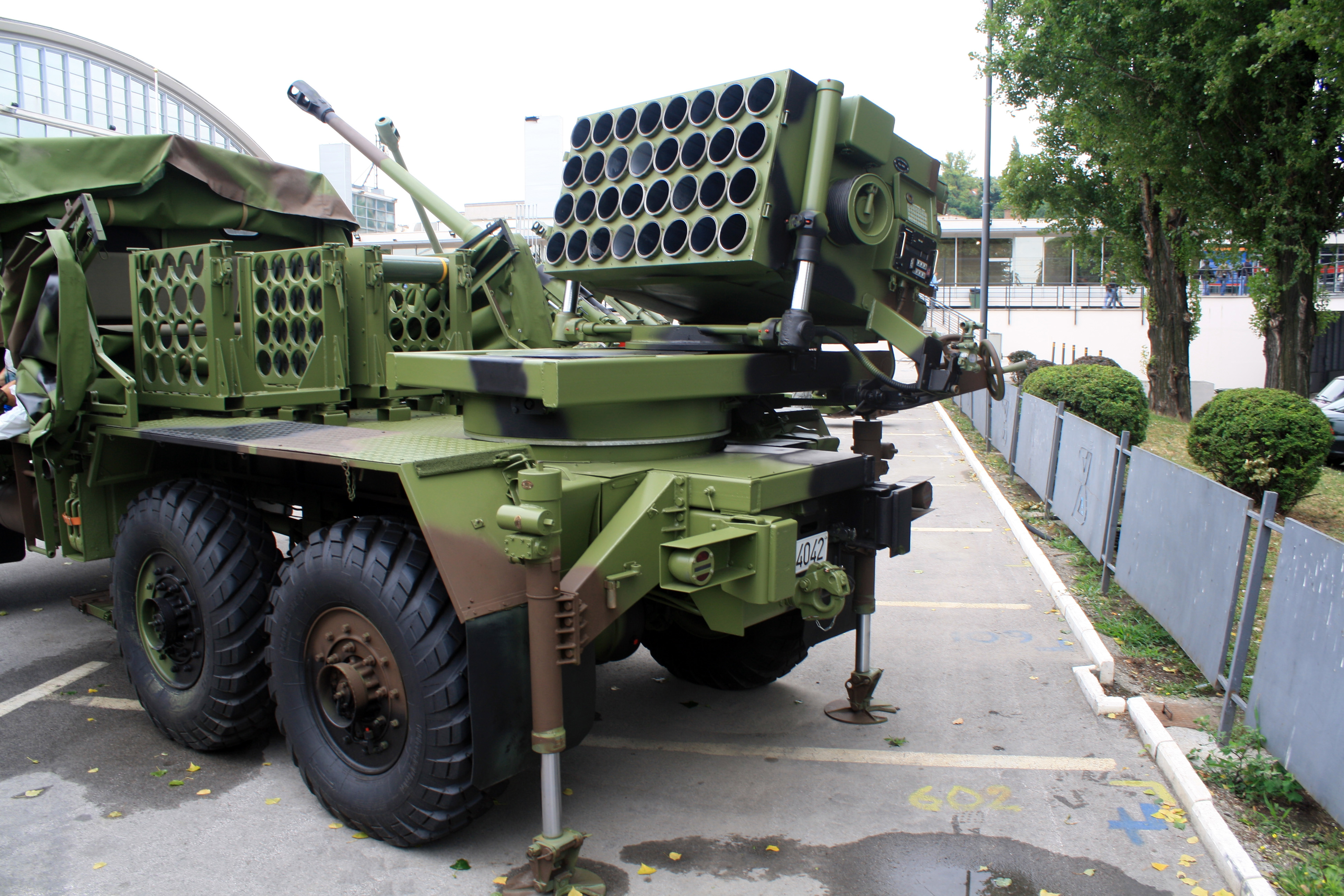
- M-94 Plamen-S
- Type: Multiple rocket launcher
- Place of origin: Yugoslavia

Service history
- In service: 1963–present
- Wars: Yugoslav Wars; Syrian civil war Second Nagorno-Karabakh War; Russian invasion of Ukraine

Production history
- Designer: Military Technical Institute
- Manufacturer: 14. oktobar Krušik
- Variants: M-94 Plamen-S

Specifications
- Mass: 2,134 kg (4,705 lb)
- Length: 3.68 m (12 ft 1 in)
- Width: 2.21 m (7 ft 3 in)
- Height: 1.26 m (4 ft 2 in)
- Crew: 6
- Shell: Length: 0.8 m (2 ft 7 in); Weight: 23 kg (51 lb)
- Caliber: 128 mm (5.0 in)
- Carriage: Split trail
- Elevation: 0° to 48°
- Traverse: 30°
- Muzzle velocity: 420 m/s (1,400 ft/s)
- Maximum firing range: 12.6 km (7.8 mi)

M-63 Plamen (from Serbian: пламен, lit. 'flame') is a 128mm multiple rocket launcher developed in Yugoslavia in 1963 for use by the Yugoslav People's Army.

== Development ==
Serbian professor Obrad Vučurović, a mechanical engineer at the Military Technical Institute, was the project manager and chief engineer in charge of the development of the M-63 Plamen and all other Yugoslav multiple rocket launchers until the country's breakup, after which he continued to develop the M-96 Orkan II for Serbia. His knowledge and experience influenced Serbia's post-Yugoslav multiple rocket launchers, including new 150-kilometre (93 mi) long-range missile systems which are in development. His work is widely acknowledged and many of the design features he developed can be found in multiple rocket launchers around the world.

The M-63 Plamen's main purpose is to support front-line units with sudden, powerful attacks on enemy forces. It can also be used against enemy positions such as encampments, airfields, industrial facilities, command centers, communication centers and storehouses. It consists of thirty-two 128mm tubes, which can fire original Plamen-A and Plamen-B unguided rockets with a range of 8,600 metres (28,200 ft). The effect of each rocket on the target is equivalent to that of a 105mm artillery shell. All thirty-two rockets can be fired in either 6.4, 12.5 or 19.2 seconds. The launcher is mounted on a single axle trailer which can be towed by vehicles with an 800-millimetre (31 in) high tow hitch. The towing vehicle carries reserve rockets, so the battle complement is sixty-four rockets.

== Operational history ==
The M-63 Plamen was widely used during the Yugoslav Wars. It has also been sighted in the Syrian Civil War, used by rebel fighters under the Free Syrian Army. It is believed that Croatian weapons, including RAK-12 launchers, were supplied by Saudi Arabia. During the Russian invasion of Ukraine, Croatian RAK-12s were delivered to the State Border Guard Service of Ukraine in 2023, and also saw use with the Azov Brigade of the National Guard of Ukraine in December 2024.

== Variants ==
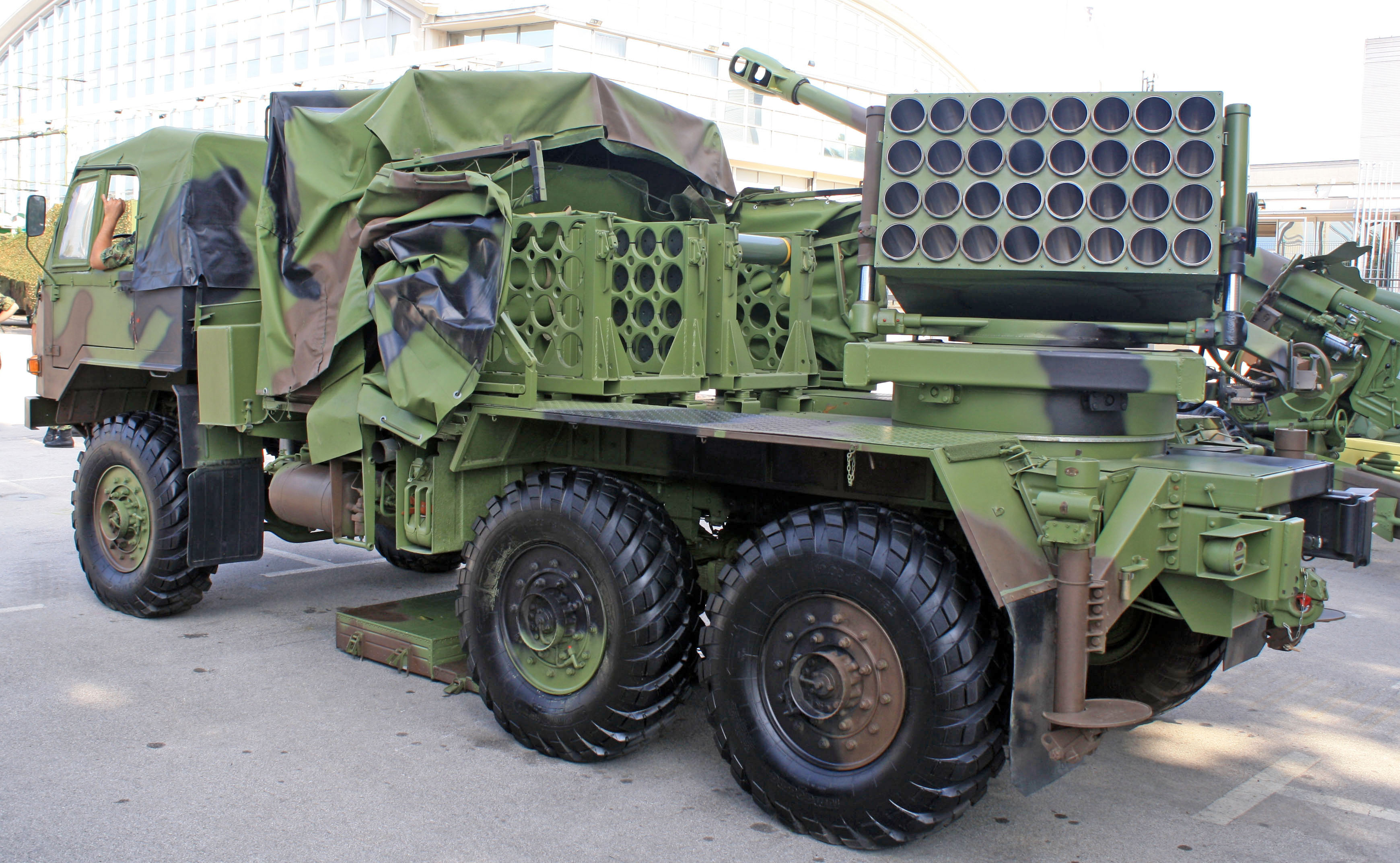
M-94 Plamen-S self-propelled multiple rocket launcher of the Serbian Army.

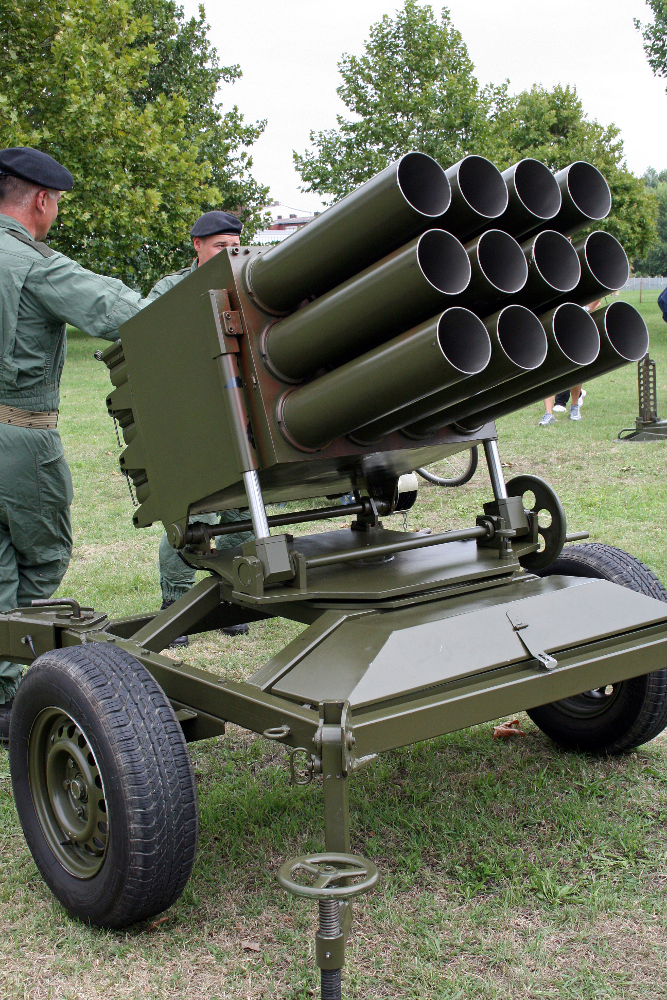
RAK-12 version of the Croatian Army.

- M-63 Plamen – Original towed 32-tube 128 mm multiple rocket launcher. Uses Plamen-A and Plamen-B rockets (with a range of 8,600 m).
- M-94 Plamen-S – Launcher mounted on a TAM 6x6 truck chassis for greater tactical mobility and allowing it to shoot-and-scoot, increasing survivability. In addition to 32 rockets in the ready-to-launch position, the Plamen-S also carries a rack with 16 additional rockets. The system features two hydraulic stabilizers to provide a more stable firing platform and can be readied to fire its rockets in 30 seconds. The Plamen-S can fire standard rockets or extended-range ones with a range of 13,000 metres (43,000 ft).
- RAK-12 – Croatian-built version with twelve 128 mm tubes, enabling weapon to be towed by lighter vehicles like Jeeps. The launcher fires two types of rockets: M91 (range 8,500 m) and M93 (range 13,000 m). The Croatian Army operates eight RAK-12 multiple rocket launchers with some 60 held in reserve.
- LOV RAK-24 – Self-propelled multiple rocket launcher with twenty-four 128 mm launcher tubes, which are mounted on the Croatian-made light armored personnel carrier LOV.

== Operators ==
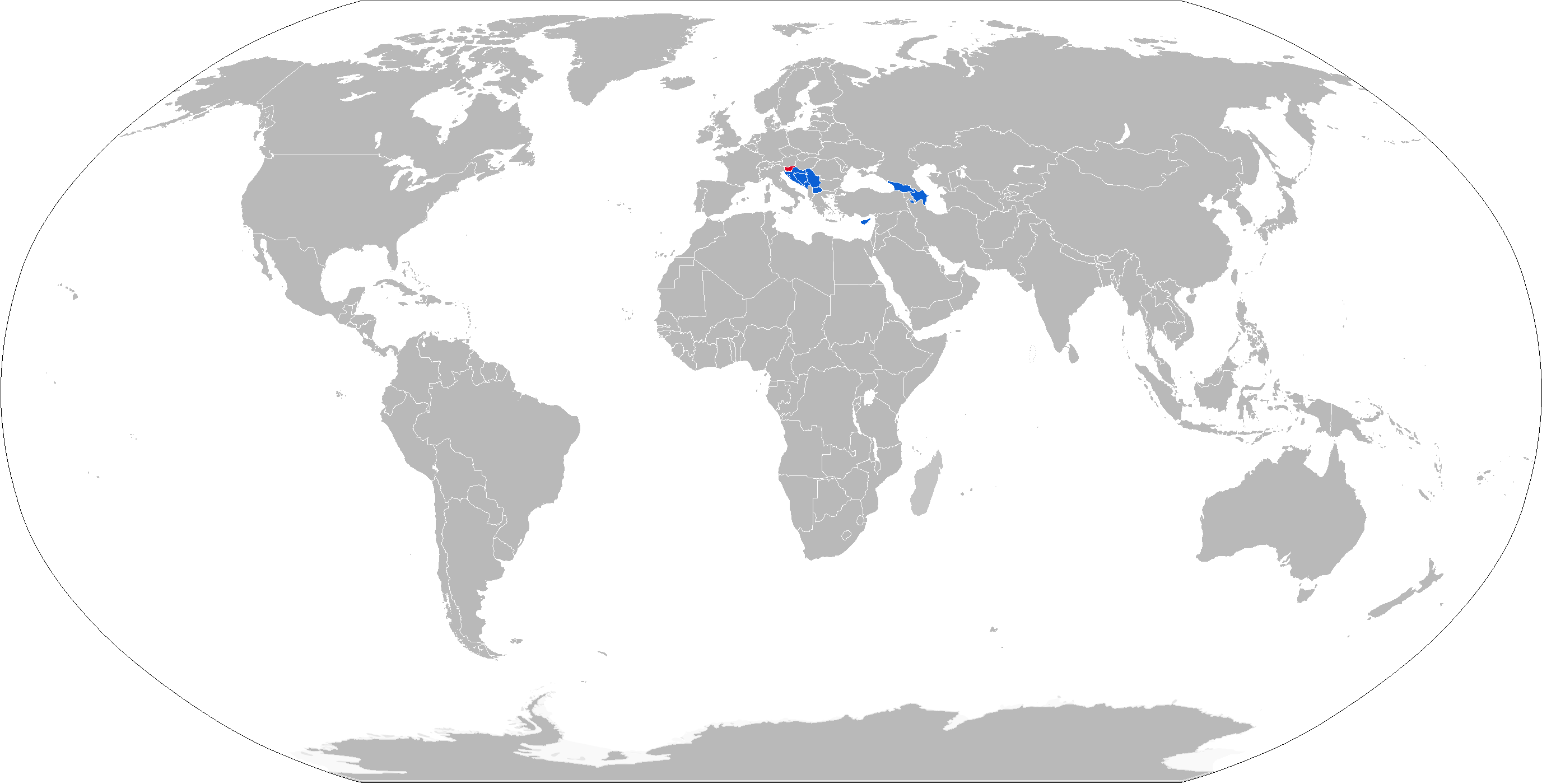
Map with M-63 operators in blue and former operators in red

=== Current ===
- Azerbaijan − 10 RAK-12 as of 2024
- Cyprus − 18 as of 2024
- Montenegro − 18 M-63/M-94 as of 2024
- North Macedonia − 11 as of 2024
- Serbia − 18 M-94 as of 2024
- Syria − RAK-12, used by the Free Syrian Army
- Ukraine − RAK-12, used by the State Border Guard Service of Ukraine and National Guard of Ukraine
- Yemen − RAK-12

=== Former ===
- Yugoslavia (passed on to successor states)
  - Bosnia and Herzegovina
  - Croatia − 2 in 2011
  - Croatian Republic of Herzeg-Bosnia − M63 and RAK-12 used
  - Republika Srpska
  - Republic of Serbian Krajina
  - Slovenia − 4 in 2011

== See also ==
=== Comparable systems ===
- M-77 Oganj – (Yugoslavia)
- M-87 Orkan – (Yugoslavia)
- Type 63 multiple rocket launcher – (China)
- T-122 Sakarya – (Turkey)
- Fajr-5 – (Iran)
- TOROS – (Turkey)
- Falaq-2 – (Iran)
- KRL 122 – (Soviet Union)

=== Replaced by ===
- LRSVM Morava New developed MLRS for Serbia Army and export intended to replace Oganj M-77, Plamen M-63 and Grad BM-21

== Bibliography ==
- Foss, Christopher F, ed. (2011). Jane's Armour and Artillery 2011-2012. Jane's Information Group. ISBN 978-0-7106-2960-9.
- International Institute for Strategic Studies (12 February 2024). "Chapter Three: Europe". The Military Balance. 124 (1). Taylor & Francis: 54–157. doi:10.1080/04597222.2024.2298591. ISSN 0459-7222.
- International Institute for Strategic Studies (12 February 2024a). "Chapter Four: Russia and Eurasia". The Military Balance. 124 (1). Taylor & Francis: 158–217. doi:10.1080/04597222.2024.2298592. ISSN 0459-7222.
