= Obrad Vučurović =

Serbian aerospace engineer and space architect

- Born: 1 April 1922; Zvečava, Krivošije, Kingdom of Serbs, Croats and Slovenes
- Died: 18 September 2013 (aged 91); Belgrade, Serbia
- Education: Faculty of Mechanical Engineering (Zagreb, Croatia); École nationale supérieure de techniques avancées (Paris, France)
- Occupations: Rocket engineer and designer, aerospace project manager
- Known for: R-262 rocket and M-87 Orkan MRLS
- Awards: 22. decembar
- Military career
- Allegiance: Yugoslavia
- Branch: Yugoslav People's Army
- Rank: General
- Scientific career
- Fields: Rocket propulsion
- Workplaces: Faculty of Mechanical Engineering (University of Belgrade, Serbia); Military Academy of the University of Defence (Serbia)

Obrad Vučurović (Serbian Cyrillic: Обрад Вучуровић; 1 April 1922 – 18 September 2013) was a Serbian rocket engineer and general of the Yugoslav People's Army. He was a leading figure in the development of rocket technology at the Military Technical Institute in Belgrade.

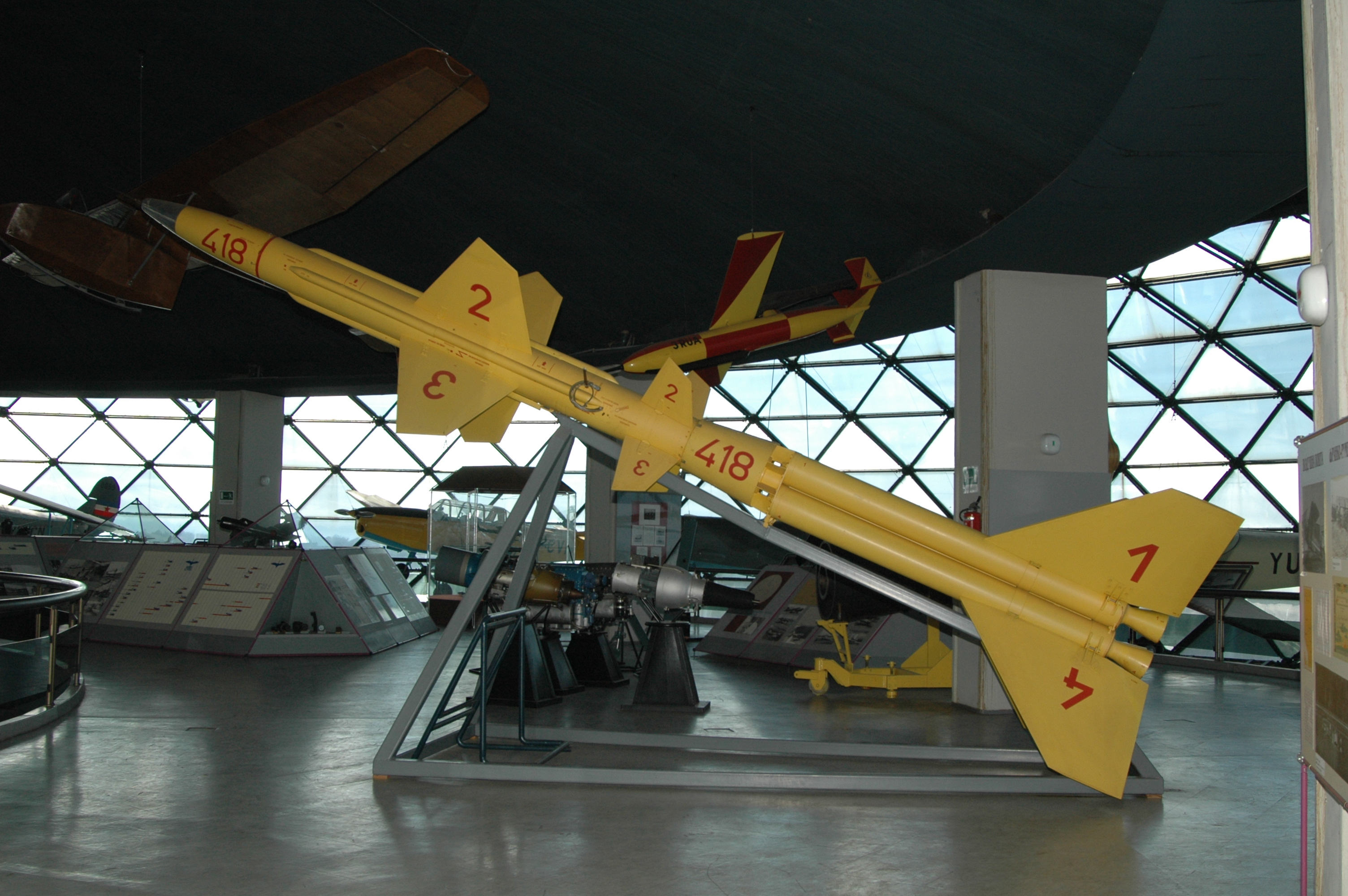
The R-25 Vulkan was one of Vučurović's first rocket designs; it was intended for air defence

== Military career ==
Vučurović completed his primary education in 1932 and his secondary education in 1941. On 13 July 13, 1941, following the Axis invasion and occupation of Yugoslavia, he joined the Yugoslav Partisans. By the end of the war, he reached the rank of major in the OZNA, later moving to the UDBA. After the war, he enrolled in the mechanical engineering faculty at the University of Zagreb, where he studied with Wernher von Braun's students, who taught as visiting professors. One of his professors became the head of the Aerospace Center in Stuttgart. Pavle Savić, the head of Yugoslavia's nuclear research program, recommended Vučurović attend two courses in Paris, where he studied nuclear technology and Western rocket development. Upon his return to Yugoslavia, he served as a Yugoslav People's Army officer in Cetinje, Kotor, Zagreb and Belgrade, and was later appointed as the head of rocket development at the Military Technical Institute (Serbo-Croatian: Vojnotehnički Institut; VTI) in Belgrade, where from 1981 to 1987, he served as director in the sector of the Joint Development of the Land Forces.

Vučurović was the progenitor of the development of military missile technology in Yugoslavia. In the early 1960s, he was involved in the development of a liquid fueled Yugoslav surface-to-air missile called R-25 Vulkan that could reach up to 25 kilometres (16 mi) in altitude. The JNA had allegedly purchased six Japanese Kappa sounding rockets together with a launch pad and radar which the Yugoslav authorities intended to use as the basis for the development of domestic air defence missiles. Vučurović had the R-25 booster engine built at the Pretis military plant in the Sarajevo suburb of Vogošća. Together with Vladimir Ajvaz, he oversaw the development of the R-25's second-stage engine at the SOKO aviation plant in Mostar. With the purchase of the Kappa, Yugoslavia was also able to acquire a basic formula for the future production of rocket fuel. The SPS factory in Vitez was later able to produce smokeless solid fuel raw chemical materials supplied by ZORKA (Šabac) and Vitkovići (Goražde), which contributed to the further development of the engine of the R-262.

Vučurović enjoyed a particularly prestigious position within the hierarchy of JNA generals due to his engineering knowledge and his responsibility for the serial production of multiple weapons systems by the Yugoslav military-industrial complex. As a result of Vučurović's efforts, some of Yugoslavia's arms factories reached high technological and quality standards for military products, which some factories could no longer maintain after the collapse of the country.

As a pioneer of Yugoslav rocket development, his greatest achievements was the development of the R-262 rocket and the M-87 Orkan multiple rocket launcher system.

Vučurović died in Belgrade on 18 September 2013, at the age of 91.

== Rocket and missile system designs ==
=== R-25 Vulkan ===
The R-25 Vulkan was a surface-to-air missile whose development began in 1958, with Vučurović as the lead engineer.

=== M-63 Plamen ===
The M-63 Plamen was developed in 1963 as a 128 mm multiple rocket launcher with Vučurović as the project manager and chief engineer of development.

=== M-77 Oganj ===
The development of the M-77 Oganj self-propelled multiple rocket launcher started in 1968 with Vucurević in charge of development and managing production.

=== M-87 Orkan and M-96 Orkan II ===
The M-87 Orkan is a 262 mm self-propelled multiple rocket launcher whose development started as part of the KOL-15 project in 1978. Vučurović had secured significant financial backing for the project from both Yugoslavia and Iraq. New rockets, launchers and vehicles were developed. Vučurović had practically all components designed by his engineers according to his plans, without paying much attention to the costs as his goal was to produce the best multiple rocket system at the time. The vehicle was specially built in 8x8 configuration by FAP in Priboj. New equipment was also purchased from the German company Leifield for processes of cylinder press rolling for the formation of rocket engine chambers at the Pretis plant. The SPS Vitez imported new equipment for the extrusion of 160 kg of two-base smokeless solid fuel (NGR 375) for the chamber of the rocket engine. Over 100 factories in the metal, chemical, automotive, telecommunications and electronics industries in Slovenia, Bosnia and Herzegovina and Serbia worked on the individual components of the KOL-15 and Orkan. Completion of the vehicles took place at the Bratstvo factory in Novi Travnik, while complete rockets with detonators and fuel were finalized in Pretis-Unis (Vogošča). Special new alloys were required when choosing the steel and aluminum alloys in order to withstand pressures by the new rocket engine. In particular, the launchers' pipes had to meet the highest requirements. For them, high-performance steels were produced in the Ravna steel mill in Slovenia, and the finished pipes were further processed in Pretis-Unis Bosnia and Herzegovina. During initial trials, multiple versions were developed and more than 500 missiles were fired. In addition to the Prevlaka and Luštica military test sites, the system was also tested at the Krivolak Military Training Center in the Socialist Republic of Macedonia, as well as in Iraq. The testing of cluster munitions took place at Krivolak, where several villages and all livestock had to be evacuated beforehand as the sub-munitions would be dispersed over a wider area than previously planned. The M-87 Orkan was presented to the public for the first time on 18 December 1987. After the delivery of prototypes to Iraq in 1990, serial production started but came to a halt shortly after the outbreak of the Yugoslav Wars. In addition to Iraq, Turkey used the M-87 Orkan as the basis of its TOROS artillery rocket system after illegally obtaining a launcher and blueprints from the Bosnian government during the Bosnian War. In the late 1990s, the M-96 Orkan II was developed as a modification on the basis of ZIL-135 vehicles that were used as part of the 9K52 Luna-M.

=== RS-120 ===
The RS-120 Uragan was developed as part of the KOL-15 project in 1989. The rocket was initially projected to have a caliber of 380 mm. It was later used as the basis for the planned four-barrelled, 400 mm multiple rocket launcher VERA, which was intended to have a range of 120 kilometres (75 mi). Many Yugoslav factories were involved in its development. The production of a complete launcher never commenced in Yugoslavia as Iraq began producing its own Ababil-100 short-range ballistic missiles, which were later renamed Al-Fat'h and mounted on a single-rail launch pad on an 8x8 truck while the M-87 Orkan was known as Ababil-50 in Iraq. Today technology obtained through VERA project is basis for new Advanced very long range Multiple Launch Rocket System, 400 mm caliber, range 200 km, quadruple, with rockets with INS-based trajectory correction system and fragmented warhead containing tungsten balls that is in development. It was planned to start development of rocket with range of 350 km with Energoinvest Sarajevo as main investor but because of the breakup of Yugoslavia the project was never finished.

=== Other developments ===
Beside mentioned rocket systems (Vulkan, Plamen, Oganj, Orkan, VERA), Vučurović had other numerous project and scientific papers and task he worked on. Some of them are:

- rockets and missiles: "Svitac", VBR-1, VBR-2, BR-10, PB-10, PB-20
- scientific papers: "Spheric Vielle's bomb construction and development";– "Fall-device Calculation and construction"; – "Recoil measuring device construction and development"; – "Missile dynamic stabilization device construction and development"; – "Rockets and multiple rocket launcher systems for 10 km ('Plamen'), 20 km ('Oganj') and 50 km ('Orkan') fire-range projects" (including assembly line production documentation); – "Preproject of Air-to-Ground 128 mm rocket";– "Air-to-Air and Air-to-Ground 57 mm rocket construction";– "Preproject of 120 km fire-range rocket and multiple launching rocket system"; – "Ground-to-Ground missile system study"; – "Light launcher PB-10 and portable launcher PB-20 project"; – "Preproject of ship-board launcher VBR-10"; – "Preproject of anti-aircraft missile "Vulkan"; – "Rocket or classical artillery analysis"; – "Very precise guided missile analysis"; – "Military system technology development analysis"; – "Antiarmour rockets and classical artillery state and perspectives analyses"; – " Precision of wind and temperature measurement using granade method"; – "Extraterrestrial space exploration with sondage rockets";

and many books about rocket constructions and technology.
