= M-18 Oganj =

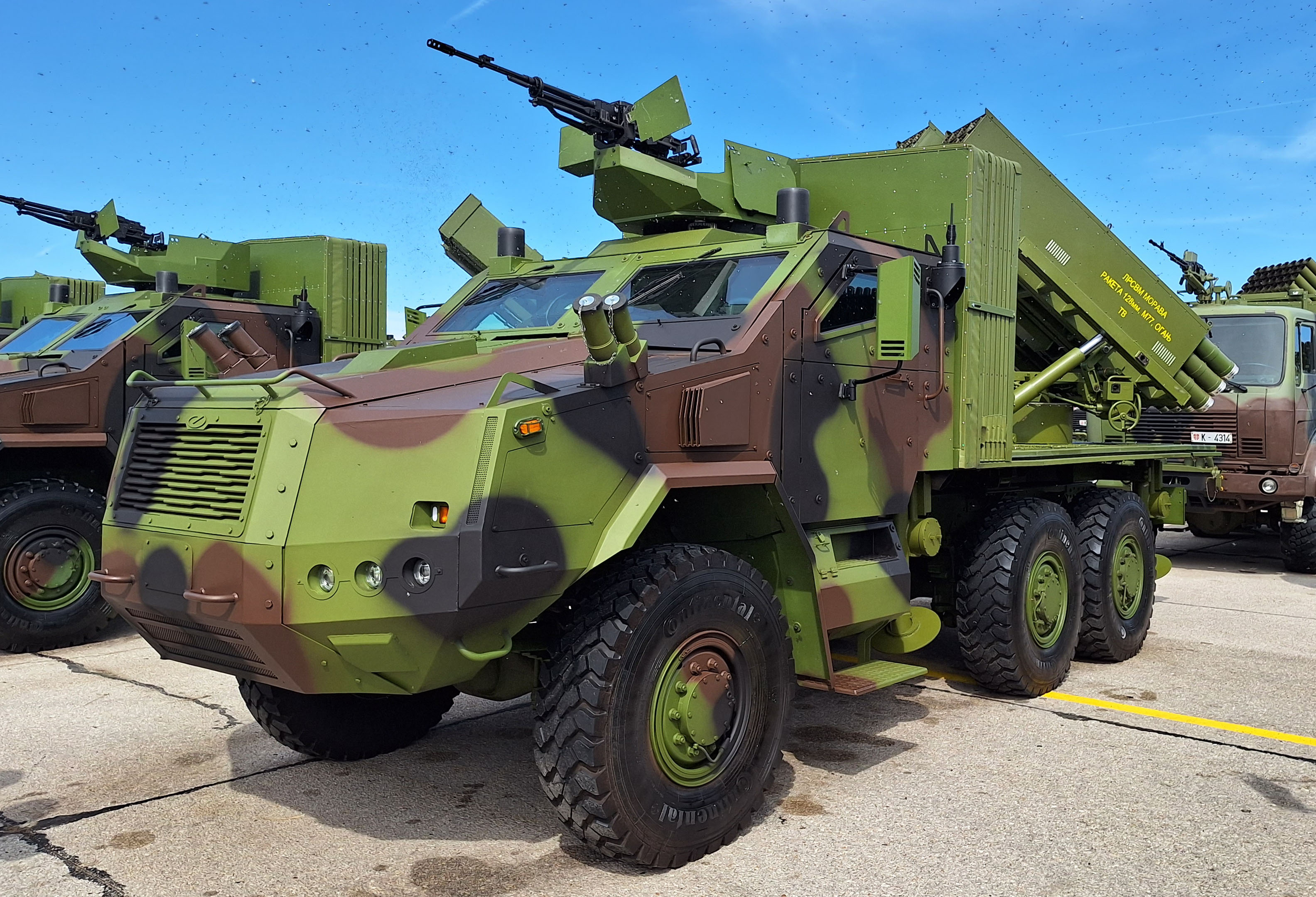
- M-18 Oganj of the Serbian Army
- Type: Self-propelled multiple rocket launcher
- Place of origin: Serbia

Service history
- Used by: Serbian Armed Forces

Production history
- Designer: Military Technical Institute
- Designed: 2018
- Manufacturer: Zastava TERVO, FAP, PPT Namenska, Krušik
- No. built: 10

Specifications
- Crew: 3
- Caliber: 128 mm (5.0 in) 122 mm (4.8 in) 107 mm (4.2 in)
- Barrels: 2 to 8 containers with different missiles
- Maximum firing range: 40 km (25 mi) with Oganj 128mm M18
- Armor: armored cabin
- Secondary armament: M86 machine gun
- Engine: Cummins; 340Hp
- Maximum speed: 80 km/h (50 mph)
- Guidance system: TV/IC and inertial for some missiles

The M-18 Oganj (from Serbian: огањ, lit. 'fire') is a Serbian modular self-propelled multiple rocket launcher. It represents an evolution of the original M-77 Oganj system, incorporating advanced digitalization, modularity, and compatibility with a wide range of munitions. The system is designed for high-mobility fire support, capable of delivering saturation strikes against enemy positions, armored formations, and fortifications while emphasizing quick setup, firing, and relocation.

== Development ==
The M-18 Oganj is built on a robust FAP 2234 6x6 wheeled chassis for off-road mobility, with an electrically powered 360° rotating turntable for the launch module. Its modularity is a standout feature: the rear launcher station accepts 2 to 8 interchangeable containers, enabling reconfiguration for different mission profiles

Added new possibilities enable launcher to easy orient itself with GPS/GLONASS assistance and inertial navigation and launch different types of guided and unguided missiles with some of them still in development. It can use ALAS and Košava 1 guided missiles. Vehicle possess antenna and other relevant parts of computerized guidance system needed to launch guided missiles, new digital radio and inertial navigation system. It can also use variety of unguided missiles in 107 mm, 122 mm, and 128 mm caliber.

During test firings, it has achieved a range of 40km using the G-2000 122mm unguided missile.

Officially unveiled in 2018, the M-18 Oganj entered serial production in the early 2020s.

== Rockets ==
| Rocket | Number of tubes in launch container or maximum number of containers | Maximum Range | Rocket caliber |
| Model | Per container | Km | mm |
|---|---|---|---|
| Plamen A | 16 | 8.6 | 128 |
| Plamen D | 16 | 12.6 | 128 |
| Oganj M77 | 12 | 22.5 | 128 |
| Oganj ER | 12 | 40 | 128 |
| Grad | 12 | 35 | 122 |
| G-2000 | 12 | 40 | 122 |
| Edepro G2000/52 | 12 | 52 | 122 |
| Krušik 107 | 25 | 11.5 | 107 |
| ALAS | 8 containers with 1 missile | 25 | 175 |
| Košava 1 | 4 containers with 1 missile | 50 | 230 |
| Košava 2 | 2 containers with 1 missile | 70 | 325 |

== Operators ==
- Serbia – 8 in service with the Serbian Army.

== Gallery ==
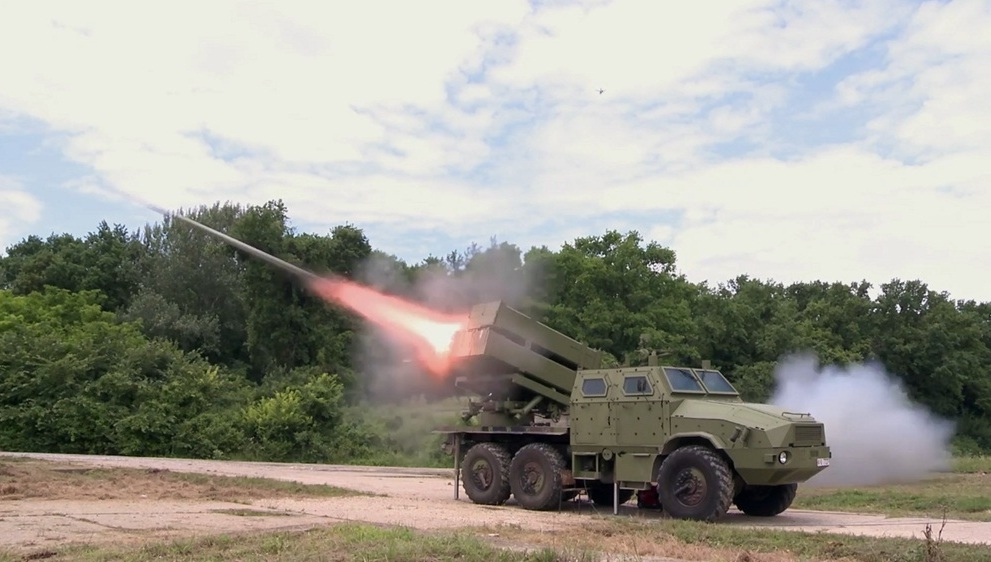

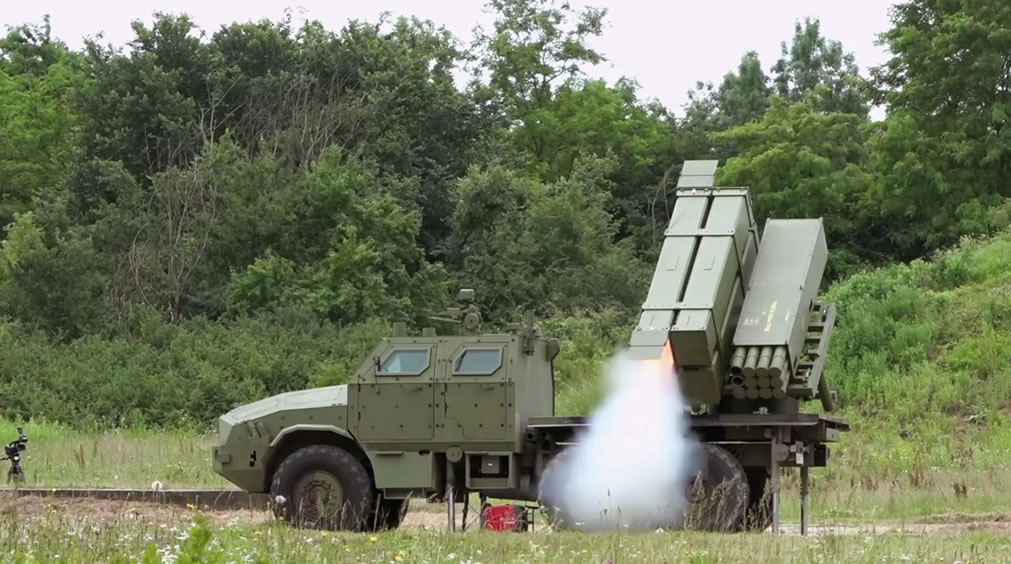

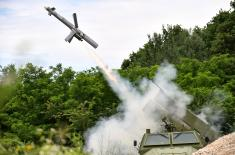

== See also ==
=== Related development ===
- LRSVM Morava

=== Comparable systems ===
- LYNX (MRL)
- Astros 2020 (Mk6)
