= R-25 Vulkan =

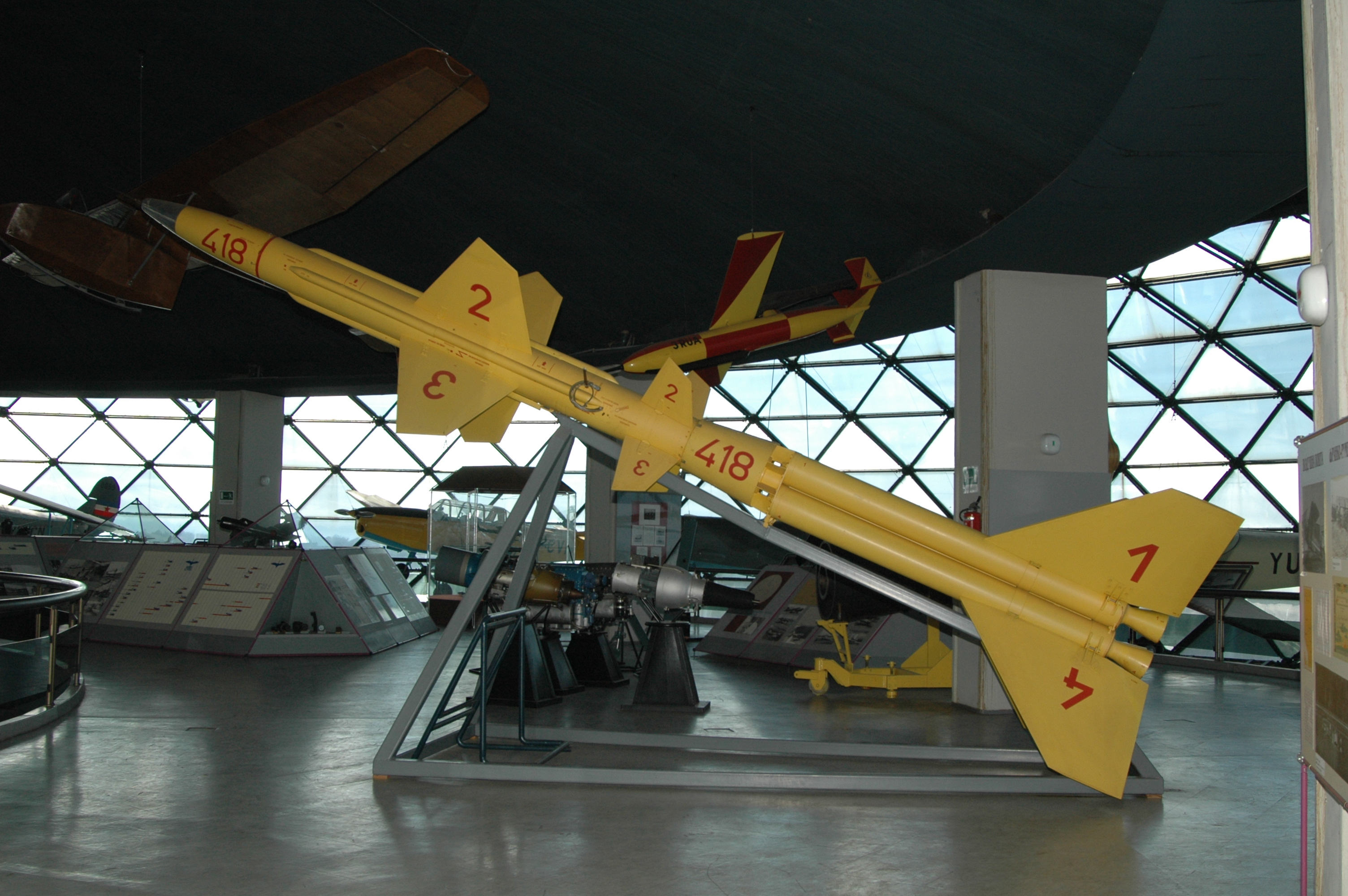
- A telemetry-equipped R-25 on display at the Aviation Museum - Belgrade
- Type: Surface-to-air missile (SAM)
- Place of origin: Yugoslavia

Production history
- Designer: Obrad Vučurović at Military Technical Institute Belgrade
- Designed: 1958 onwards
- Manufacturer: SOKO
- No. built: 12

Specifications
- Mass: 1,413 kg (3,115 lb) at launch
- Length: 8.10 m (26.6 ft) total length at launch
- length: 5.24 m (17.2 ft) missile without booster rockets
- Diameter: 350 mm (14 in)
- Engine: RM-1000B sustainer 11.77 kN (2,650 lbf) thrust - sustainer, 245.25 kN (55,130 lbf) thrust - boosters
- Propellant: liquid fuel sustainer, solid-fuelled boosters
- Operational range: 30 km (19 mi)
- Flight altitude: 20 km (12 mi)
- Maximum speed: M2.5
- Guidance system: Radar initially with infra-red terminal guidance
- Steering system: Aerodynamic

The R-25 Vulkan (Serbian: Вулкан) was a surface-to-air missile designed by Serbian engineer Obrad Vučurović and built in the Socialist Federal Republic of Yugoslavia in the late 1950s and early 1960s.

== Development ==
The mid-1950s saw the emergence of viable surface-to-air missiles for the purpose of air defence. Due to their inability to import foreign surface-to-air missile systems, in 1958 Yugoslavia initiated a program to develop an indigenous missile at the Military Technical Institute in Belgrade. Designated the R-25 Vulkan (Volcano), this completely original Yugoslavian design brought together a team of experts led by engineer Obrad Vučurović to design the missile, with the prototypes being made in the SOKO aircraft factory in Mostar.

Two versions of the missile were developed: one that had a booster-rocket engine with seven rockets and a second one with four rockets. Although, initial prototypes used a liquid fuel rocket engine developed for a rocket-powered torpedo, later operational production missiles would use a solid-fueled engine with twice the thrust. The development of the launcher and radar system was inspired by the Japanese Kappa meteorological sounding rocket imported into Yugoslavia. The target detection and information collection system was supplied by Yugoslav-made OAR M-61 “Fruška Gora” S-Band surveillance and acquisition radar, and in-course guidance was supplied by a British No. 3 Mk. 7 aiming radar. For operational use, there existed the possibility of using more sophisticated radar equipment, and for terminal guidance the missile would switch to independent homing by infrared sensors in its nose cone. The advanced guidance system of the R-25 was automatic after launch with no further operator input needed.

== Use ==
The first launch of the missile was conducted in November 1962, revealing problems with the liquid-fueled sustainer rocket motor. Concurrently, with the R-25 testing in 1962 the SFRY acquired S-75 Dvina (Russian: С-75; NATO reporting name: SA-2 Guideline), missile systems from the Soviet Union. As such, by the end of 1964 the decision was made to abandon the Vulkan project with a total of twelve missiles having been produced. The knowledge and experience gained during this project were later incorporated into other projects for the production of other armaments for the Yugoslav People's Army (JNA).

== Survivors ==
A single R-25 Vulkan missile is preserved at the Museum of Aviation Museum in Belgrade; intended for in-flight testing, the warhead has been replaced by measuring and telemetry equipment.
