= M-77 Oganj =

Yugoslav self-propelled multiple rocket launcher

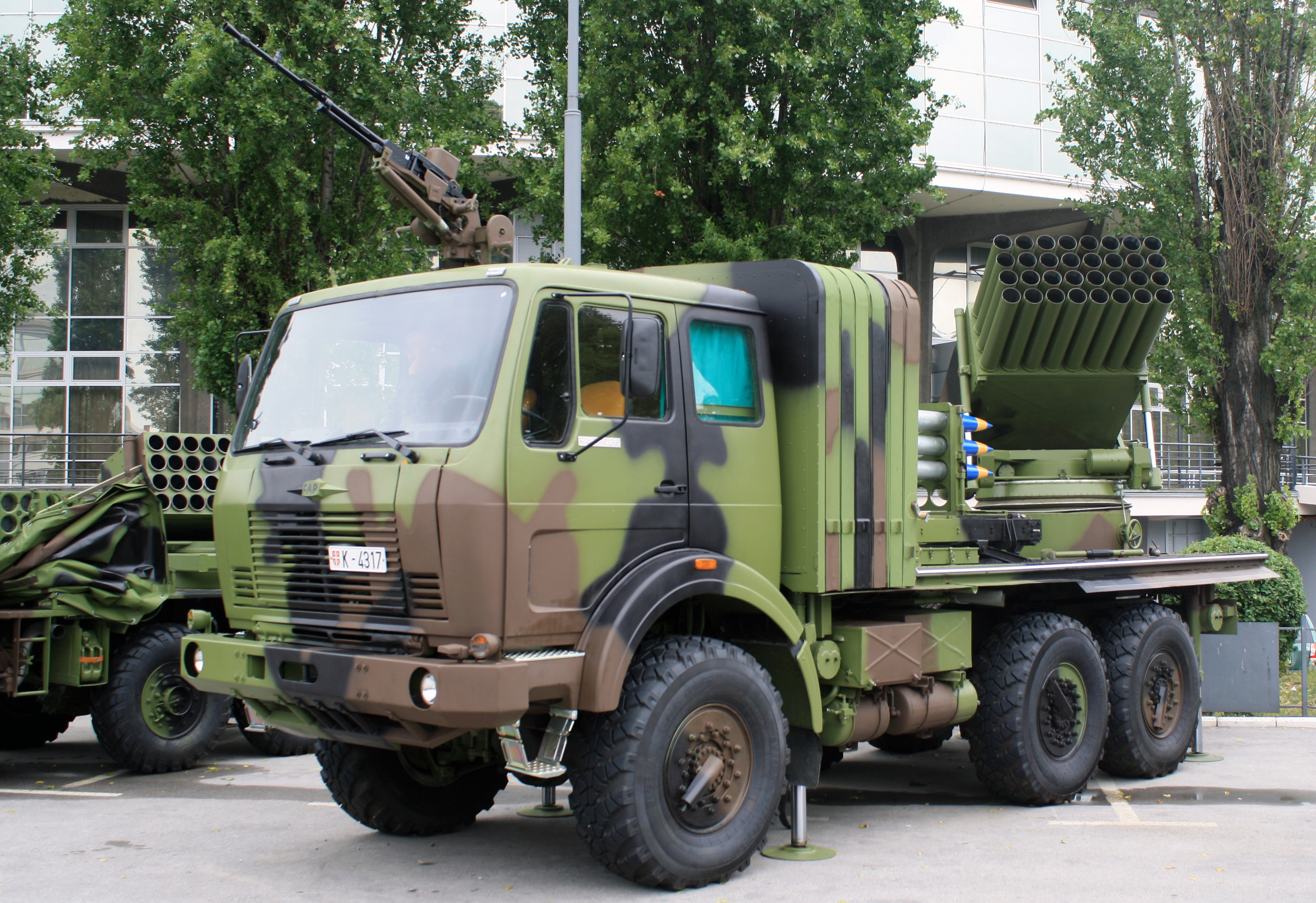
- M-77 Oganj of the Serbian Army
- Type: Self-propelled multiple rocket launcher
- Place of origin: Yugoslavia

Service history
- In service: 1977–present
- Wars: Yugoslav Wars

Production history
- Designer: Military Technical Institute
- Designed: 1968–1975
- Manufacturer: BNT (Bosnia and Herzegovina); 14. oktobar (Serbia); Krušik (Serbia)
- Produced: 1975

Specifications
- Mass: 22.4 tonnes (49,383 lbs)
- Length: 8.4 m (27 ft 7 in)
- Width: 2.49 m (8 ft 2 in)
- Height: 3.1 m (10 ft 2 in)
- Crew: 5
- Cartridge: Length: 2.6 m (8 ft 6 in); Weight: 65 kg (143 lb); Warhead: 20 kg (44 lb)
- Caliber: 128 mm (5.0 in)
- Barrels: 32
- Maximum firing range: 20.6 km (12.8 mi); 40 km (25 mi) (modernized); 50 km (31 mi) (new missiles with trajectory correction)
- Secondary armament: NSV or M2 Browning machine gun
- Maximum speed: 80 km/h (50 mph)

The M-77 Oganj (from Serbian: огањ, lit. 'fire') is a 128mm self-propelled multiple rocket launcher developed in the former Yugoslavia.

== Development ==
Development of the system began in 1968. Professor Obrad Vučurović, the Chief Operating Officer of the Military Technical Institute's artillery department, was responsible for overseeing its development and production.

The six pre-serial production models were based on a FAP 2220 6x6 truck and were shown to the public for the first time in 1975. Serial production commenced two years later. The serial production variant is mounted on FAP 2026 BDS/A 6x6 truck bed. The rocket system is placed on the back of the platform and contains 32 128mm launch tubes capable of reaching targets 20.6 kilometres (12.8 mi) away. The system is operated by five personnel. One of its unique features is its retracting canvas, which allows the rocket launcher to be easily disguised and makes it difficult for the enemy to spot until the crew is ready to fire. It is thus an effective means of military deception. In 1994, Serbia developed a new version called the M-94 Oganj C, which could fire M91 (cluster-type warhead with 40 submunition grenades) and M77 (HE warhead) rockets. This version featured a 32-rocket reloading system which makes it possible to fully reload and launch a second salvo within three minutes.

== Modernization ==
The Military Technical Institute has prepared a modernization package for the system on request from the Serbian Armed Forces which includes a modern navigation and fire control system. The upgraded variant got designation M-17D Oganj. The rocket launcher was also modified to be able to fire several different types of rockets, including the 122mm BM-21 Grad. As part of the modernization program, a new 128mm rocket with a range of 50 kilometres (31 mi) and improved circular error probable (CEP) will be produced by Krušik. For the needs of the Serbian Army, the modernization process entailed a switch to modern digitalized technology, which enables the crew to occupy a firing position, fire their rockets and leave three minutes without exiting the vehicle, whereas it previously took 26 minutes to assume a position and fire a salvo. At that time, it included occupying the orientation position and determining the coordinates of the firing position, directing the weapon in the azimuth of the basic direction, calculating the initial elements, correction and group shooting. Due to the new automatic aiming line, automatic determination of the coordinates of the firing position and shooting elements, as well as the new inertial navigation system and GPRS navigation, the modernized variant is able to open fire much faster, more precisely and with a greater effect on the target. New M-18 missiles with a range of up to 40 kilometres (25 mi) have also been introduced, as has a new rocket with path correction and with a range of up to 50 kilometres (31 mi). The latter has entered serial production for delivery to the Serbian Army.

Further development of the M-17D concept led to the creation of the new modular rocket launcher M-18 Oganj, which contains an armored cabin on a 6x6 chassis for up-close battlefield action and is capable of launching the ALAS missiles.

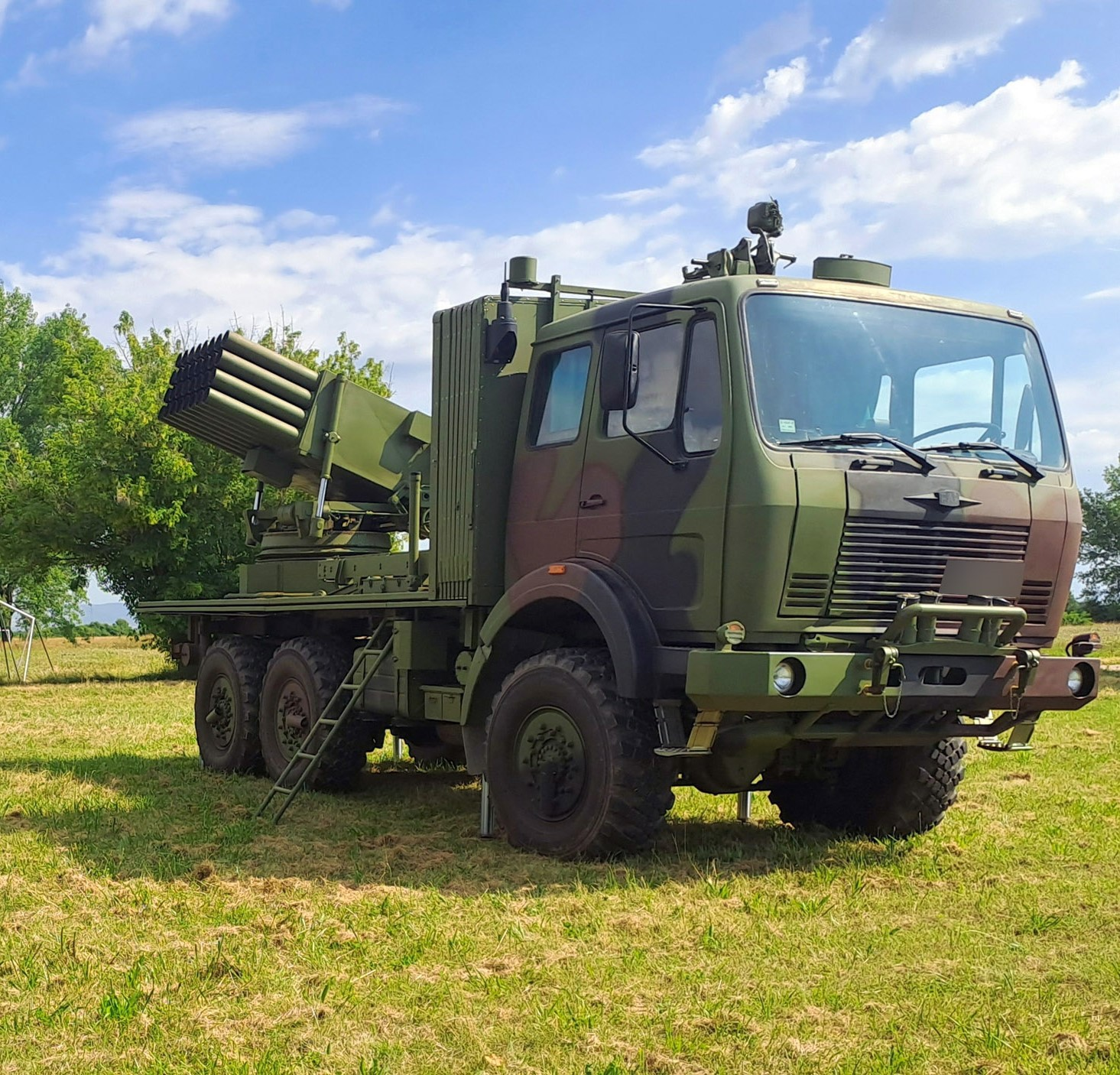
M-17D Oganj, modernized variant of M-77 Oganj

== Operators ==
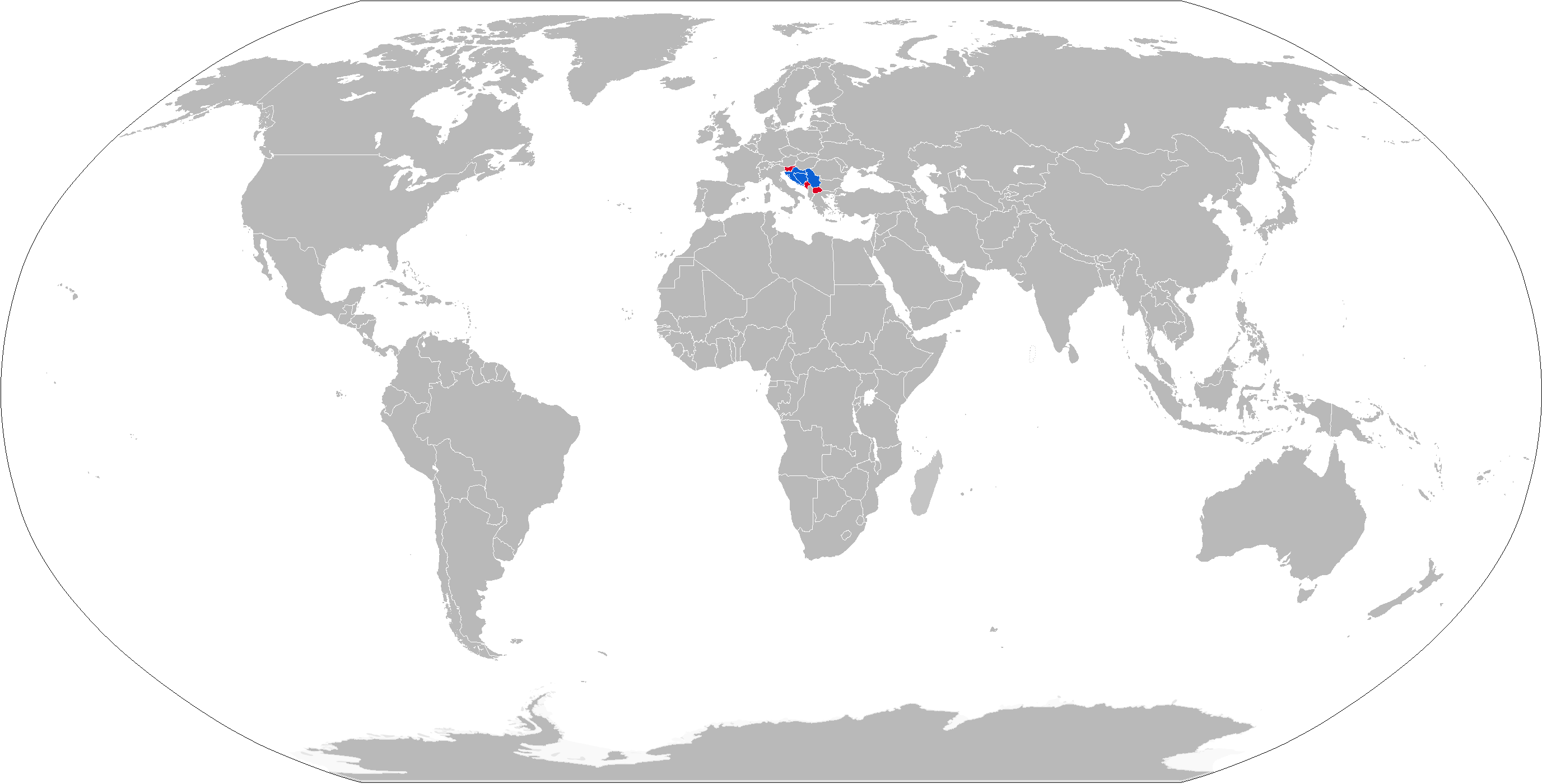
Operators Current Former

=== Current operators ===
- Bosnia and Herzegovina – 20
- Croatia – 12 (uses 122mm caliber)
- Cyprus – 8
- Serbia – 60 (of which 25 M-17D variant)

=== Former operators ===
- Yugoslavia

== See also ==
=== Related development ===
- M-63 Plamen (Yugoslavia)
- M-87 Orkan (Yugoslavia)
- M-18 Oganj (Serbia)

=== Comparable systems ===
- BM-21 Grad (Soviet Union)
- LAROM (Romania)
- RM-70 (Czechslovakia)
- WR-40 Langusta (Poland)
