= Košava 2 =

- Type: Rocket artillery, surface-to-surface missile
- Place of origin: Serbia

Production history
- Designer: Military Technical Institute
- Designed: 2018

Specifications
- Diameter: 0.325 m (1.07 ft)
- Maximum firing range: 50 km (31 mi)
- Maximum speed: 0.25 km/s (0.16 mi/s; Mach 0.73)
- Guidance system: inertial navigation guidance with TV/IR homing in final stage
- Accuracy: meters
- Launch platform: Oganj LRSVM M18

The Košava 2 (Serbian: Кошава, lit. 'Whirlwind') is a Serbian surface-to-surface missile designed by the Military Technical Institute and first presented in 2021. It has a range of about 31 miles (50 km), with solid propellant. The Košava 2 can be fired from the Oganj LRSVM M18 multiple rocket launcher. Its launch container is similar to that of the ALAS missile.

== Origin ==
The Košava 2 is a further development of the Košava rocket bomb launcher developed in the 1990s, which used unguided bombs like the FAB-100, FAB-250 and FAB-500 with modified rocket motors to attack ground targets. Two different platforms were developed, one based on the TAM 150 truck and one based on the FAP 2026 truck. It is based on the FAB-250 unguided bomb.

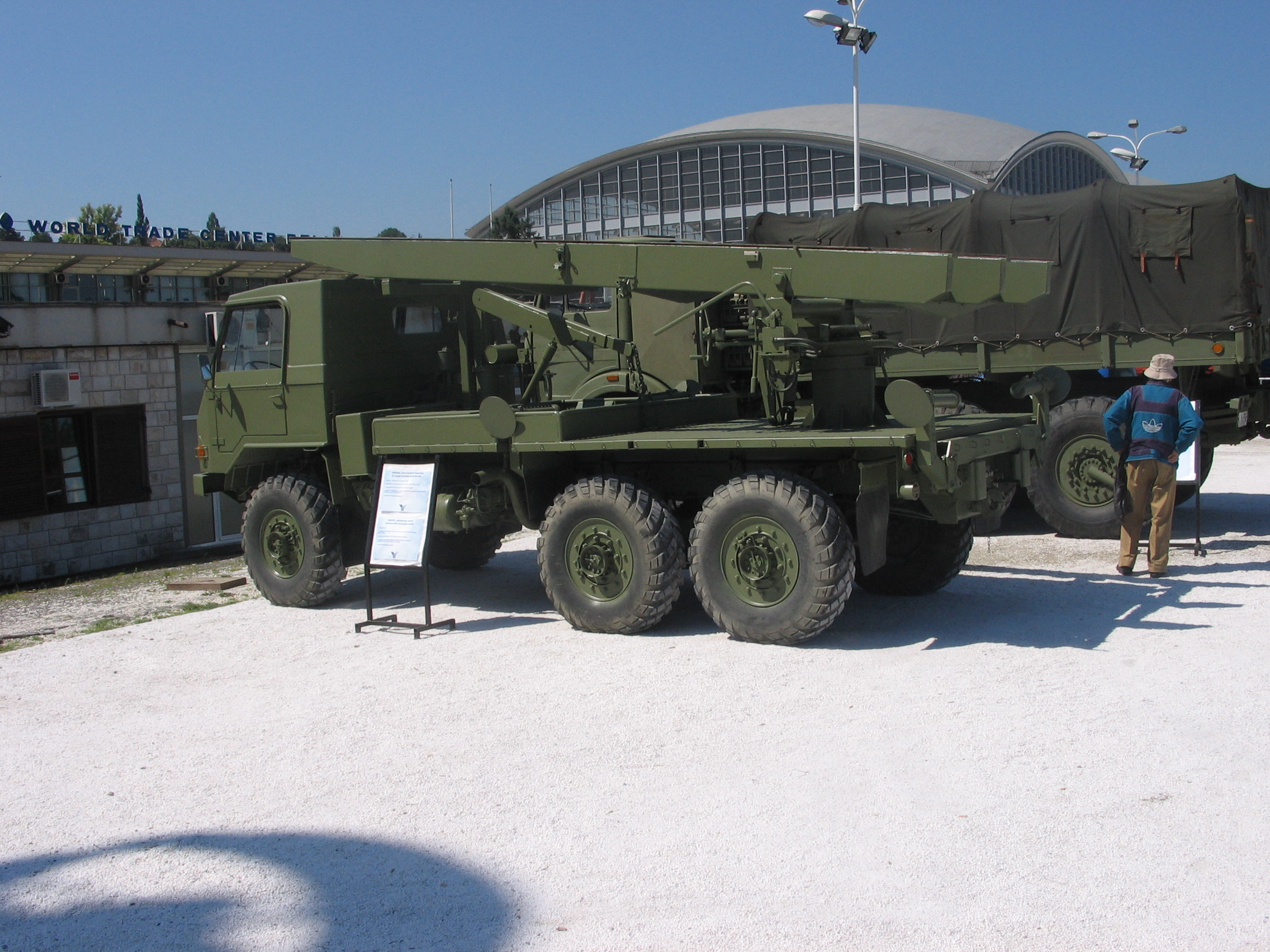
Košava launcher of the Serbian Armed Forces based on the TAM-150

== See also ==
- Košava 1
