= Košava 1 =

- Type: Rocket artillery, surface-to-surface missile
- Place of origin: Serbia

Production history
- Designer: Military Technical Institute
- Designed: 2017

Specifications
- Mass: 248 kg (547 lb)
- Length: 2.670 m (8.76 ft)
- Diameter: 0.230 m (0.75 ft)
- Maximum firing range: 50 km (31 mi)
- Maximum speed: 0.25 km/s (0.16 mi/s; Mach 0.73)
- Guidance system: inertial navigation guidance with TV/IR homing in final stage
- Launch platform: M-18 Oganj

The Košava 1 (Serbian: Кошава 1) is a Serbian solid-fuel surface-to-surface missile designed by the Military Technical Institute. It has a range of 31 miles (50 km). The Košava 1 can be fired from the M-18 Oganj multiple rocket launcher. Its launch container is similar to that of the ALAS missile. It is named after the Košava squall wind.

== Origin ==
The Košava 1 is a development of the Košava rocket bomb launcher developed in the 1990s. In the past, unguided bombs like the FAB-100, FAB-250 and FAB-500 with modified rocket motors were used to attack ground targets. Two different platforms were developed, one based on the TAM 150 truck and one based on the FAP 2026 truck.

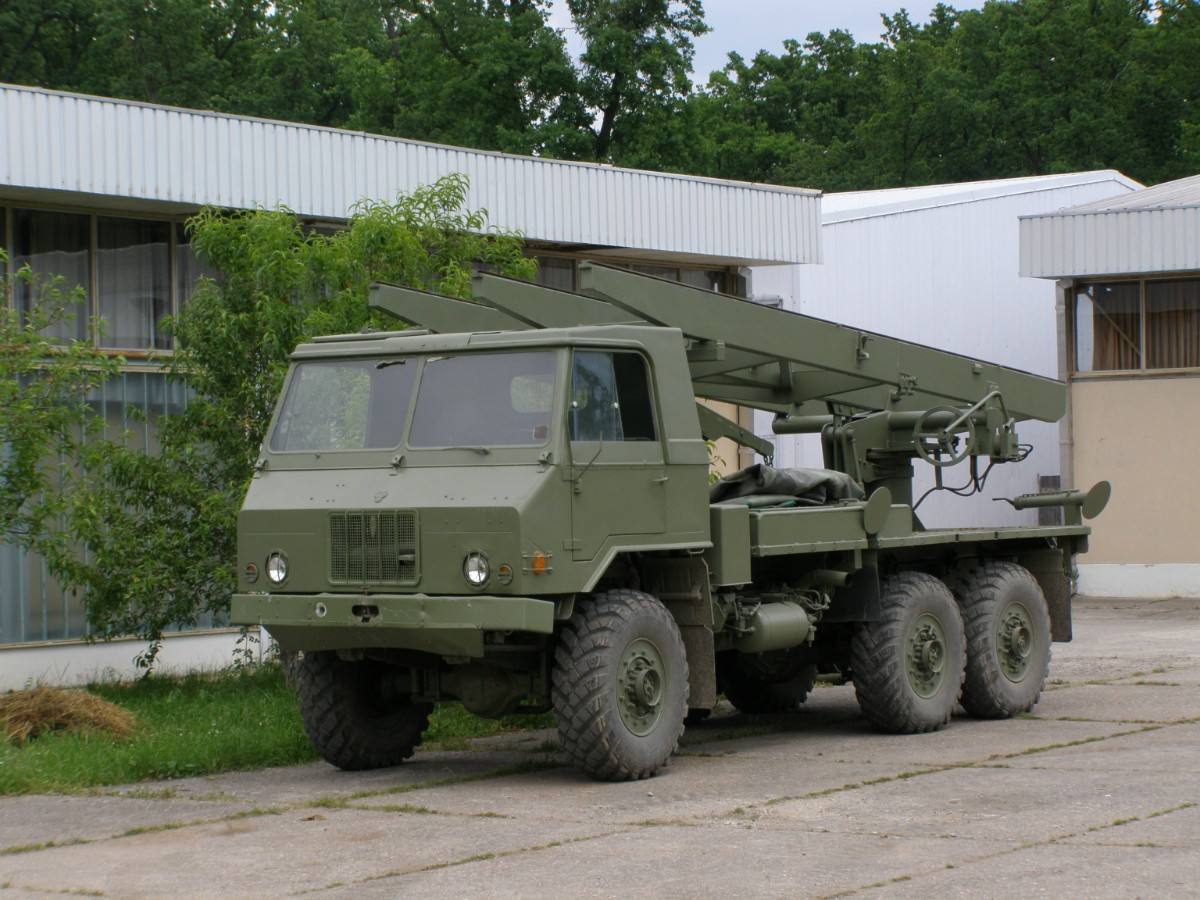
Serbian Armed Forces prototype launcher based on the TAM-150

== Description ==
For increased ease of use, the Košava 1 is launched from a container, thus enabling easy reloading of the launcher. In order to increase accuracy, it has inertial guidance with a TV/IR homing head. After launching, its wings spread and the rocket engine ignites. After it has reached minimum range and appropriate altitude, depending on the target range, it continues flying towards the target using lift generated by its wings. As it approaches towards the target area in its later phase of flight, it is guided via data-link using a TV/IR head for terminal guidance. Using data-link, the operator can choose and lock on any designated target via TGM and point the missile in whichever desired direction. The target can be a fortification, command post or command vehicle, tank, ship, section of bridge or something else that the 100kg warhead can damage or destroy. It is on weapons officer to decide target based on orders, battlefield condition, possibilities of system he uses, importance and value of target.

== See also ==
- Košava 2
