= Kappa (rocket) =

Family of Japanese sounding rockets

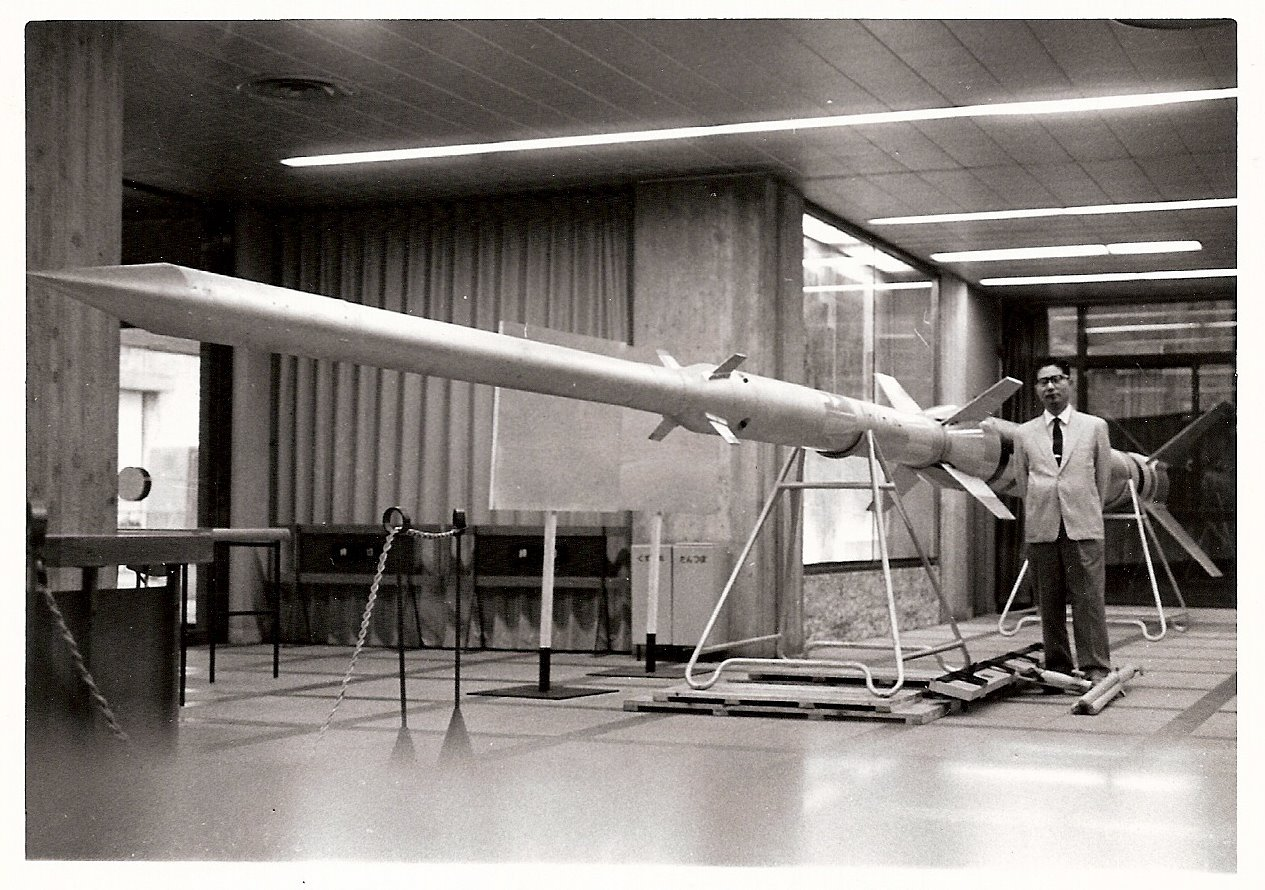
Kappa-9L rocket

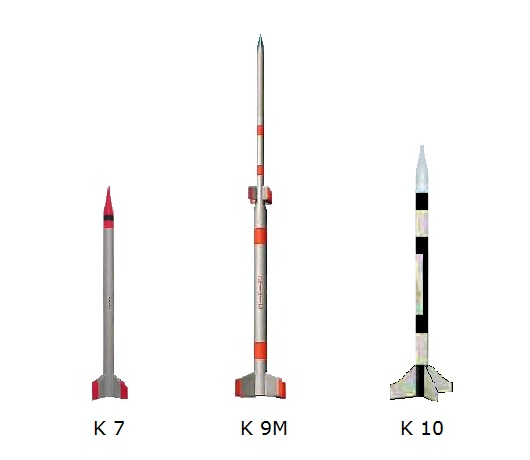
Kappa rockets

Kappa was a family of solid-fuel Japanese sounding rockets, which were built starting from 1956. The series included several models with increasing capabilities and was used for atmospheric and ionospheric observations. Its development contributed to the establishment of Japan's early rocket research and space programme.

== History ==
The Kappa grew out of the rocket work of Hideo Itokawa at the University of Tokyo's Institute of Industrial Science, which began in 1955 with the 23 cm Pencil Rocket. The Akita Rocket Range was established in August 1955 at Michikawa Beach in Akita Prefecture, where the Pencil and Baby rockets were launched. The International Geophysical Year ran from July 1957 to September 1958, and one of its goals was to measure upper-atmosphere winds and temperatures with rockets. Japan took part with the two-stage Kappa-6, which Itokawa's team had ready in time, and the country was one of only four, with the United States, the Soviet Union and the United Kingdom, to launch sounding rockets independently during that period. ISAS's timeline records a flight of the two-stage Kappa rocket reaching an altitude of 60 km in June 1958.

== Development ==
Project Kappa was designed to produce an inexpensive, easy-to-handle, two-stage solid-propellant sounding rocket. In 1959–60, Itokawa's team refined the Kappa-6 and put it into extended actual service use, introducing a new propellant with a higher specific impulse in a version designated Kappa-6H. The Kappa 9M was first launched in November 1962, and a total of 81 rockets in the series were launched between 1962 and 1988. In February 1970, a sounding rocket developed by the University of Tokyo began observations at Japan's Showa Station in Antarctica. The Kappa's success gave Japan confidence in solid-fuel rocket technology, which became the mainstay of the country's later launch-vehicle program.

== Rockets ==
=== Kappa 1 ===
- Ceiling: 40 km
- Takeoff thrust: 10.00 kN
- Diameter: 0.13 m
- Length: 2.70 m

=== Kappa 2 ===
- Ceiling: 40 km
- Mass: 300 kg
- Diameter: 0.22 m
- Length: 5 m

=== Kappa 6 (in two stages) ===
- Pay load: 20 kg
- Ceiling: 60 km
- Takeoff weight: 270 kg
- Diameter: 0.25 m
- Length: 5.61 m

=== Kappa 7 ===
- Ceiling: 50 km
- Diameter: 0.42 m
- Length: 8.70 m

=== Kappa 8 (in two stages) ===
- Pay load: 50 kg
- Ceiling: 160 km
- Takeoff weight: 1500 kg
- Diameter: 0.42 m
- Length: 10.90 m

=== Kappa 4 ===
- Ceiling: 80 km
- Takeoff thrust: 105.00 kN
- Diameter: 0.33 m
- Length: 5.90 m

=== Kappa 9L ===
- Pay load: 15 kg
- Ceiling: 350 km
- Takeoff weight: 1550 kg
- Diameter: 0.42 m
- Length: 12.50 m

=== Kappa 9M ===
- Pay load: 50 kg
- Ceiling: 350 km
- Mass: 1500 kg
- Diameter: 0.42 m
- Length: 11.10 m

=== Kappa 8L ===
- Pay load: 25 kg
- Ceiling: 200 km
- Takeoff weight: 350 kg
- Diameter: 0.25 m
- Length: 7.30 m

=== Kappa 10 ===
- Ceiling: 742 km

== See also ==
- R-25 Vulkan
