= TOROS artillery rocket system =

Turkish long-range multiple launch rocket system

TOROS
- Type: Multiple rocket launcher

Service history
- Used by: See Users

Production history
- Designer: TÜBİTAK-SAGE
- Manufacturer: TÜBİTAK-SAGE
- Variants: See Variants

Specifications
- Maximum firing range: 110 km (68 mi)

TOROS artillery rocket system (Turkish: Topçu Roket Sistemi; Turkish pronunciation: [topˈtʃu], lit. "Gunner") is a Turkish rocket artillery multiple rocket launcher system that has been developed in both 230 and 260 mm calibre. The system was developed by TÜBİTAK-SAGE, and is used by the Turkish Army. The larger calibre rockets have a maximum range of 110 km (68 mi) deliver a 145 kg (320 lb) high-explosive fragmentation warhead containing 30,000 steel balls. It is developed by the Turkish Defense Industry.

== Description ==
This system is in general copy of Military Technical Institute Belgrade M-87 Orkan with some minor modification in rocket design, different fuel for rocket and tubes. It is developed through reverse engineering and plans obtained for Orkan M-87 including launcher M-87 and rocket 262mm used in that process all obtained from BNT Bratstvo Novi Travnik from Bosnia and Herzegovina. Sage is also known for reverse engineering of M270 Multiple Launch Rocket System 227mm rocket under designation SAGE 227 a program started because the United States' reluctancy to share technology with Turkey. 230mm rocket is continuation of SAGE 227 rocket program and 260mm rocket is based on 262mm Orkan M-87 rockets.

The 230 mm calibre system consists of six TOROS-230 unguided medium range rockets in a disposable launcher pod. The 260 mm calibre system consists of four TOROS-260 rockets in a disposable launcher pod. The launcher vehicle is designed to accept two TOROS-230 or TOROS-260 launcher pods.

Both rockets use an HTPB/AP solid propellent, and are stabilised in flight by four wrap-around fins. Sabots are fitted to the front of the rocket which fall away shortly after launch. Both rockets use a fin detent system to reduce wind dispersion, and are reported as having a dispersion of between one and two percent of their range. A variety of warheads have been proposed for the system including the basic blast fragmentation warhead, an electronic warfare warhead and a bunker busting warhead.

The launcher pods and advanced fire control system enable fast supply, loading, unloading, positioning and orientation operations. The unloading and reloading operations for two launch pods can be completed in less than twelve minutes. The system can be moved into position, oriented to target, and fired, all without the crew leaving the armoured cab. The launcher has a crew of three, but can be operated by a single person if needed.

Dispersion is reduced by helical rails which provide high roll rate during launch.

The system consists of four vehicles:

- Launcher vehicle 6×6
- Logistics vehicle 6×6
- Maintenance vehicle 6×6
- Fire Command-Control vehicle 4×4

== Specifications ==
	SAGE-230A	SAGE-260A
Diameter	230 mm	260 mm
Length	4.1 m (13 ft)	4.8 m (16 ft)
Mass	326/197 kg	485/280 kg
Operational temperature	-30/+55 °C	-30/+55 °C
Range	20–65 km (12–40 mi)	25–110 km (16–68 mi)
Dispersion	2%	2%
Propellant	HTPB/AP	HTPB/AP
Shelf life	10 year	10 year

Launcher pods	TOROS-230	TOROS-260
Number of tubes	6	4
Length	4.2 m (14 ft)	4.9 m (16 ft)
Width	1.0 m (3.3 ft)	0.9 m (3.0 ft)
Height	0.8 m (2.6 ft)	0.9 m (3.0 ft)
Empty mass	552 kg (1,217 lb)	647 kg (1,426 lb)
Loaded mass	2,442 kg (5,384 lb)	2,441 kg (5,381 lb)

== See also ==
- M-87 Orkan - Yugoslavian multiple rocket launcher system.
