= M-87 Orkan =

M87 LRSV
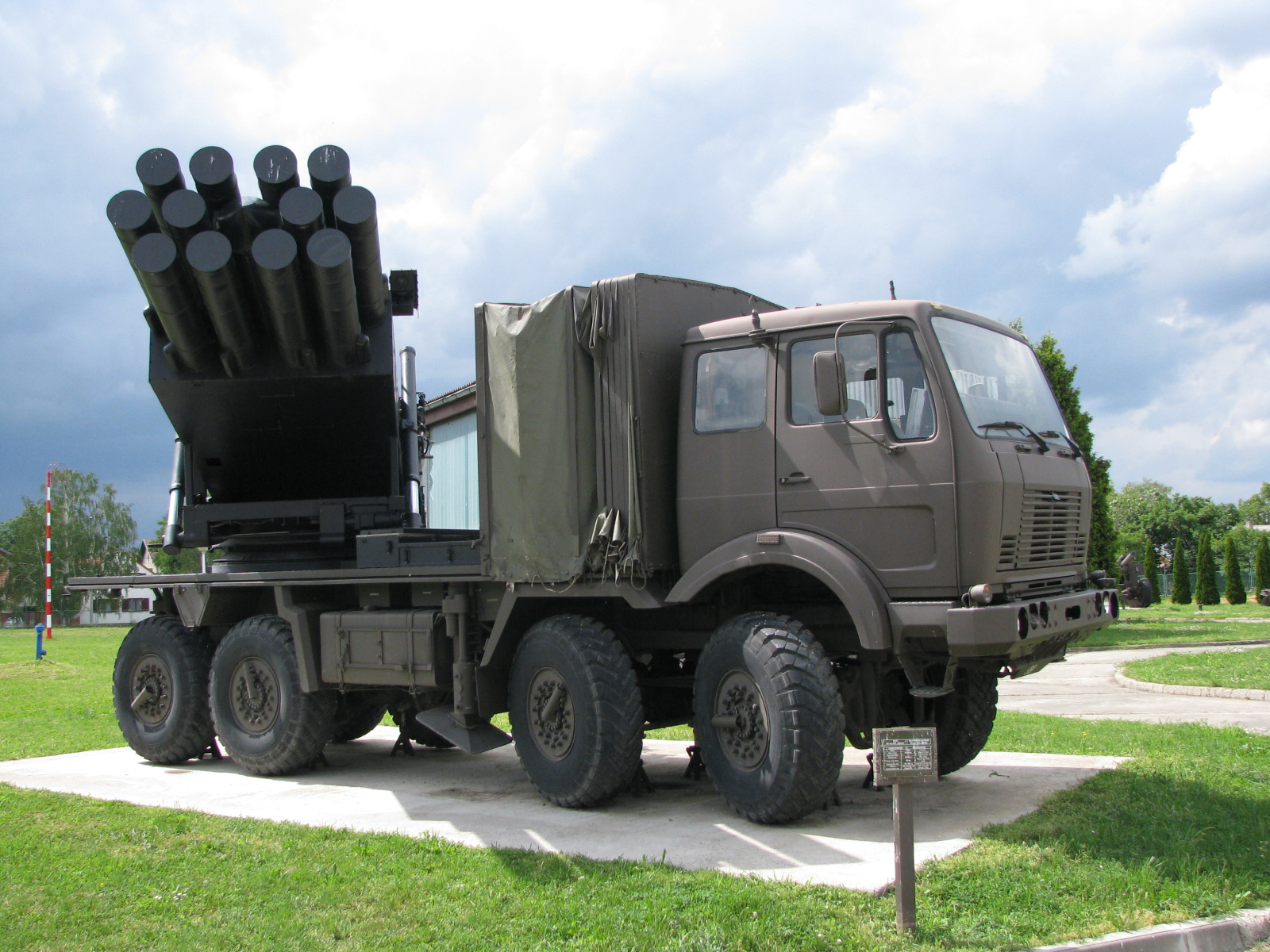
- Former Croatian M87 Orkan in Museum
- Type: Self-propelled multiple rocket launcher
- Place of origin: Yugoslavia

Production history
- Designer: Military Technical Institute

Specifications
- Mass: 32t
- Length: 9 m (29 ft 6 in)
- Width: 2.64 m (8 ft 8 in)
- Height: 3.84 m (12 ft 7 in)
- Crew: 5
- Main armament: 262 mm x 12; Orkan ll x 4
- Engine: diesel
- Maximum speed: 80 km/h (50 mph)

The M-87 Orkan (from Serbian: оркан, lit. 'hurricane') is a Yugoslav fully automated self-propelled multiple rocket launcher.

== History ==
Development started as a joint Yugoslav and Iraqi project under the name of KOL-15 with professor Obrad Vučurović as a concept designer and chief engineer on the project. In early talks with Iraq, Yugoslavia offered two options:

- Development of a MRL with 12 barrels and a 50 km range;
- Development of a MRL with 4 barrels and a 120 km range.

Iraq chose the first option as did Yugoslavia.

At the start of development, two prototypes were built: one for Yugoslavia and one for Iraq. In accordance with requests from purchasers, rockets were developed with cluster warheads.

According to the chief operating officer of the Artillery department of Military Technical Institute professor Obrad Vučurović, Orkan was never a copy of any previous designs. The Yugoslav doctrine when developing the system was based on the premise that countries who copy designs are at least five years behind those who have the weapons developed.

The production of Orkan M-87 ceased in the early 1990s due to the breakup of Yugoslavia.

== Characteristics ==
One battery of M-87 Orkans consists of:

- four 8×8 launchers
- four 8×8 resupply vehicles (each with 24 rockets)
- one 8×8 command post vehicle
- two 4×4 topographic survey light vehicles
- two 4×4 observation post-light vehicles
- one 4×4 meteorological survey vehicle

The FAP 2832 vehicle with its base platform is fitted with a central tyre pressure regulation system which is operated by the driver from within the cab, and to provide a more stable firing platform. Four stabilisers are lowered to the ground by remote control, one at either side to the rear of the second roadwheel and two at the very rear. When travelling, the launcher is traversed to the front and the whole launcher is covered by a tarpaulin cover with integral bows.

=== Rockets ===
The rocket is 4.6 metres long and it is packed in a glass-ceramic housing and transported by vehicle. Rockets are reloaded by the FAP 3232 with a built-in crane. The rocket speed is 1000 m/s. Rockets with extended range are 4.88 m long and weigh 404 kg. A battery of 4 launchers with 16 barrels and 192 rockets can cover a target area of 3–4 km².

The following types of rockets are known:

- M-87-APHE with a fragmentation warhead to 91 kg. Range 50 km.
- M-87-APHE-ER with a fragmentation warhead to 91 kg. Range 65 km.
- M-87-PFHE-ER pre-fragmented warhead containing double-size balls. Range 65 km.
- M-87-ICM-AT with 288 piece shaped charge bomblets type KB-2 . Range 50 km.
- M-87-ICM-AP with 420 piece splinter bomblets. Range 50 km.
- M-87-AT with 24 piece YU-S-AT (KPOM) mines with Magnetos. Range 50 km.

Some of the rockets are no longer in production.

=== Features ===
Unique features at the time of introduction (1987) when compared to other MRLs operational at the time include:

- Ability to disperse anti-tank or anti-personnel mines up to 50 km from the firing location.
- Semi-automatic loading.
- Preparations to fire take two minutes.
- Automatic leveling. Automatic Leveling of weapon was very precise. The system has a TV camera corrector for correcting missile path.
- Automatic barrel sight.
- Hard chromed barrels without the need for cleaning.
- Mines KB-2 with wings and parachutes with two fuses (magnetic and mechanism for self-destruction after 24 or up to 48 hours)

According to Obrad Vučurović, Orkan's main feature was the ability to disperse anti-tank or anti-personnel mines from 5 to 50 km from the firing location.

== Modifications and versions ==
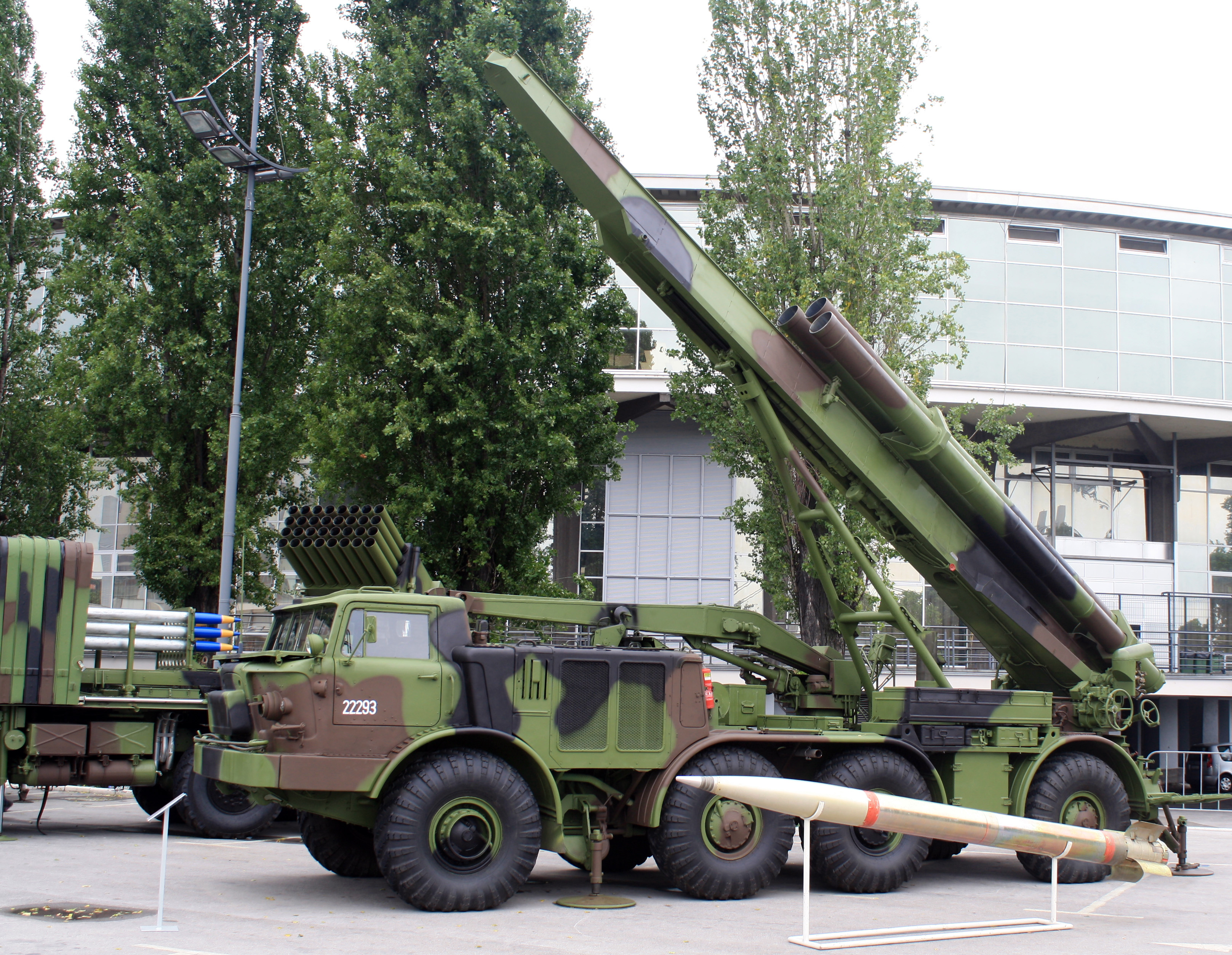
Orkan II at the 2011 Partner international weapons trade fair

There were a few modifications of Orkan M-87:

- The first modification was made by Army of Republika Srpska with two barrels placed on Luna R-65 launcher (ZIL-135).
- Serbia and Montenegro modified Krupp M-418/37 and placed two Orkan barrels on it.
- Serbia developed the M-96 Orkan II modification. The simplest solution was to integrate four 262mm launch tubes on a ZIL-135 launcher as it required minimum investment. The basic purpose of these modified launchers can be restored. Newly developed rockets increased range of Orkan II to 65 km.
- Orkan CER developed by Yugoimport SDPR based on KamAZ-6350.
- Dominator M2/12 MLRS multi-caliber multiple launch rocket system developed by Yugoimport SDPR using 16 262mm Orkan rockets.

=== Iraq ===
- Ababil 50 − A locally assembled M-87 using some parts made in Iraq prior to 1991 and used by the Iraqi Army during the Gulf War, it fired 262 mm (10.3 in) rockets with a 95 kg (209 lb) warhead and a maximum range of 50 km (31 mi). It could fire conventional high-explosive, cluster, or minelayer rockets.
- Ababil 100 − An enlarged version firing 400 mm (16 in) rockets with a maximum range of 100 km (62 mi), it could also fire cluster and minelayer rockets. It never entered service since it was in development, though production of rocket motors reportedly resumed after the Gulf War.

=== TOROS artillery rocket system ===
In 1990s Turkey faced US reluctance to share modern defense technology. In order to have domestic supply of multiple rocket launcher rockets and domestic launchers Turkey used reverse engineering and shortcuts in order to develop its own versions. In order to have a supply of 227mm rockets they reverse engineered M270 Multiple Launch Rocket System M26 rocket under project designation SAGE 227. For continuing work on development of domestic MRLS Turkey obtained Orkan M-87 documentation, launcher and rockets from Bosnia and Herzegovina's "Bratstvo Novi Travnik" factory in 1995. They used them for development of a domestic 260mm rockets and launcher thus shortening development for more than 5 years. First launches of new 230mm and 260mm rockets respectively based on 227mm M26 and 262mm Orkan rockets produced in Turkey from Orkan M-87 launcher were conducted in April 1999.

== Former operators ==
- Serbia - 4 M-96 Orkan II
- Bosnia and Herzegovina - 1 non-operational unit in Banja Luka, 1 completed and 3 partially assembled units destroyed along with rockets.
- Croatia - 1 in reserve due to lack of adequate rocket ammunition, 1 in a museum
- Iraq - four launchers and four reload vehicles. In 2000-2001, the reload vehicles were transformed into launchers, using modified SM-90 launchers from the S-75 Dvina SAM system, with six tubes instead of 12. No longer operational.
- Yugoslavia - 9 + 1 prototype

== See also ==
- Astros II – (Brazil) - an earlier, very similar system
- TOROS – (Turkey) - rocket artillery system developed by reverse engineering the M-87 Orkan.
- M270 Multiple Launch Rocket System – (United States)
- Fajr-5 – (Iran)
- BM-30 Smerch – (Soviet Union)
