= BOV M11 =

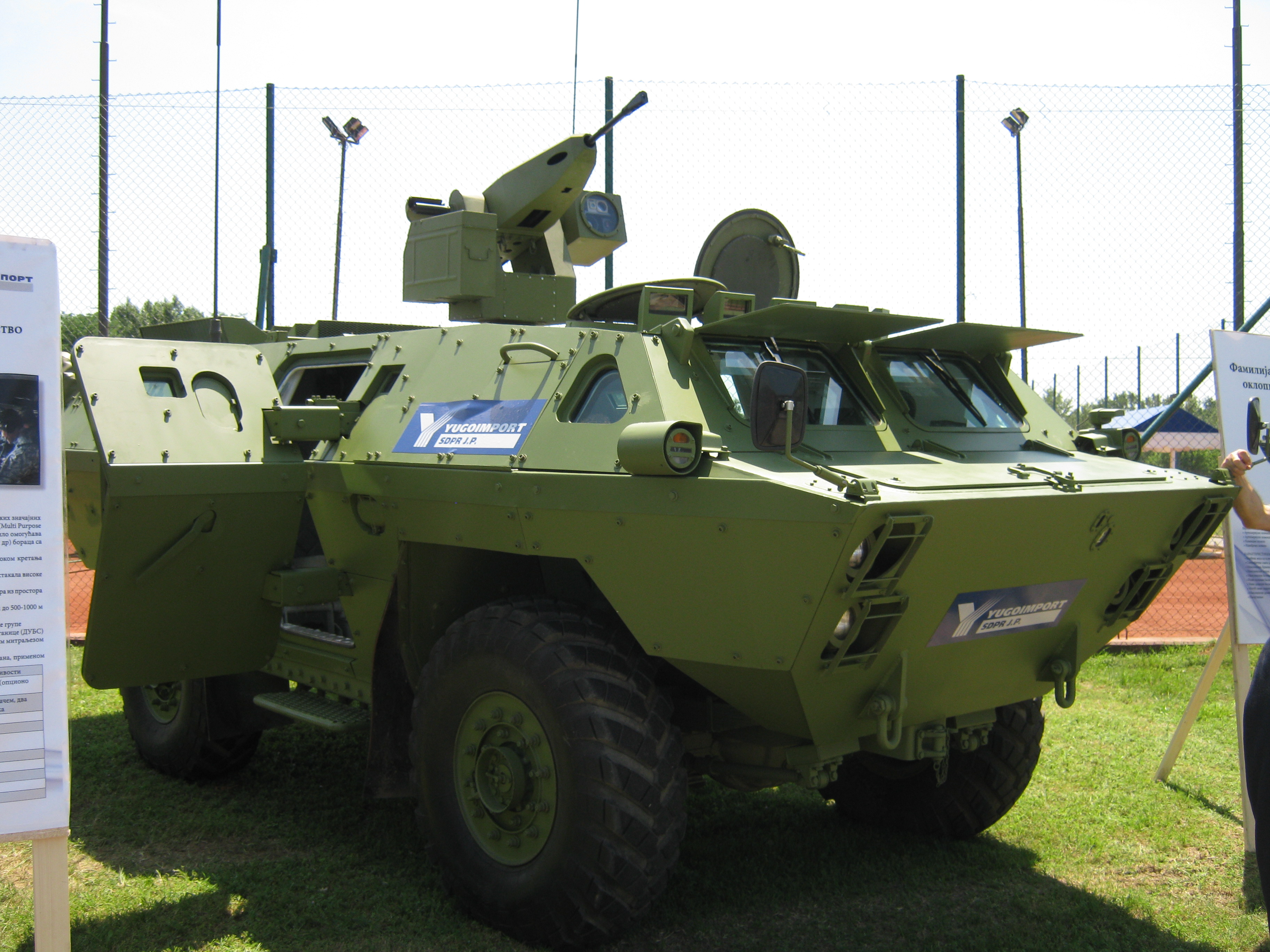
- BOV M11
- Type: Armored reconnaissance vehicle
- Place of origin: Serbia

Service history
- Used by: See Operators

Production history
- Designer: Military Technical Institute
- Manufacturer: Yugoimport SDPR

Specifications
- Mass: 9.5 tonnes (20,062 lbs)
- Length: 5.7 m (18 ft 8 in)
- Width: 2.53 m (8 ft 4 in)
- Height: 2.33 m (7 ft 8 in)
- Crew: 3 + 4 passengers
- Armor: STANAG 4569 Level III front, Level II sides and aft.
- Main armament: 12.7mm RWS provides day/night sight
- Engine: diesel 190 hp
- Suspension: 4×4 wheeled, fully independent
- Operational range: 600 km
- Maximum speed: 100 km/h (62 mph)

The BOV M11 is part of the BOV family of light armored vehicles manufactured by Yugoimport SDPR.

== Description ==
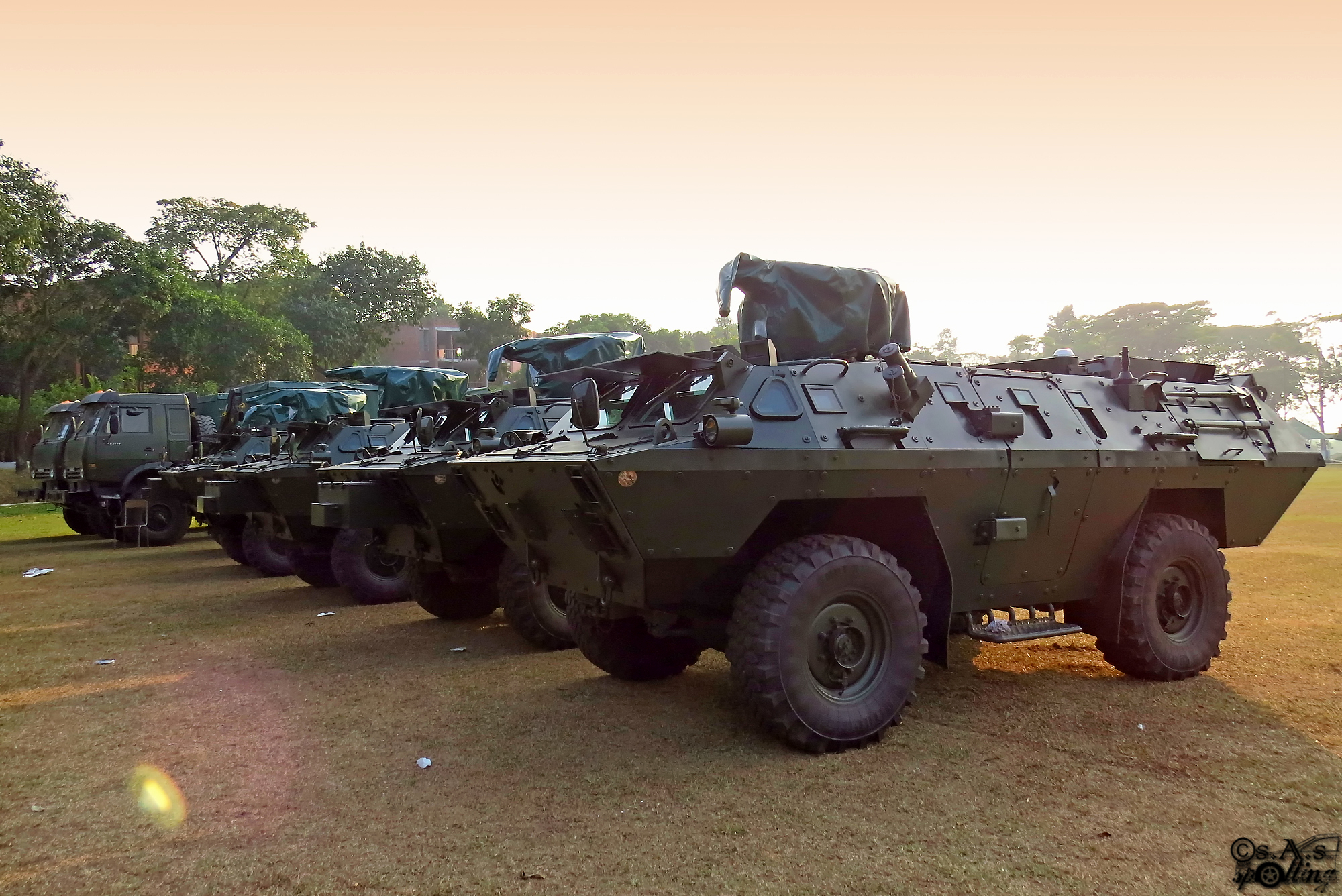
Bangladesh Army BOV M11

The BOV M11 has a primary role as a reconnaissance vehicle and command-reconnaissance vehicle. If used by artillery units, it could function as a remote observation post that observes an enemy and guides firing. Typically, an M11 is manned by a crew of 3, composed of a driver, commander, and gunner; the vehicle can accommodate up to four more personnel that could include scouts and the artillery command platoon’s commanding officer (CO).

The vehicle has a four-wheel drive and is powered by a diesel engine developing 190 hp. It may have specialized reconnaissance systems and artillery systems depending on its mission. The vehicle has a thermal camera sight at its front and a CCD camera at its rear. It is also equipped with an artillery electronic direction finder (AEG), artillery battery FCS computer, and other communications equipment.

The vehicle is typically armed for day and night combat. Typically, the main weapon system is a 12.7 mm heavy machine gun on a remote-controlled weapon station (RCWS). It is possible to integrate an additional RCWS with a 7.62 mm gun or 30 mm grenade launcher such as the BGA-30. Other M11 variants may be equipped with a BOV M10 RCWS with a 20 mm gun and 7.62 mm coaxial gun.

== Operators ==
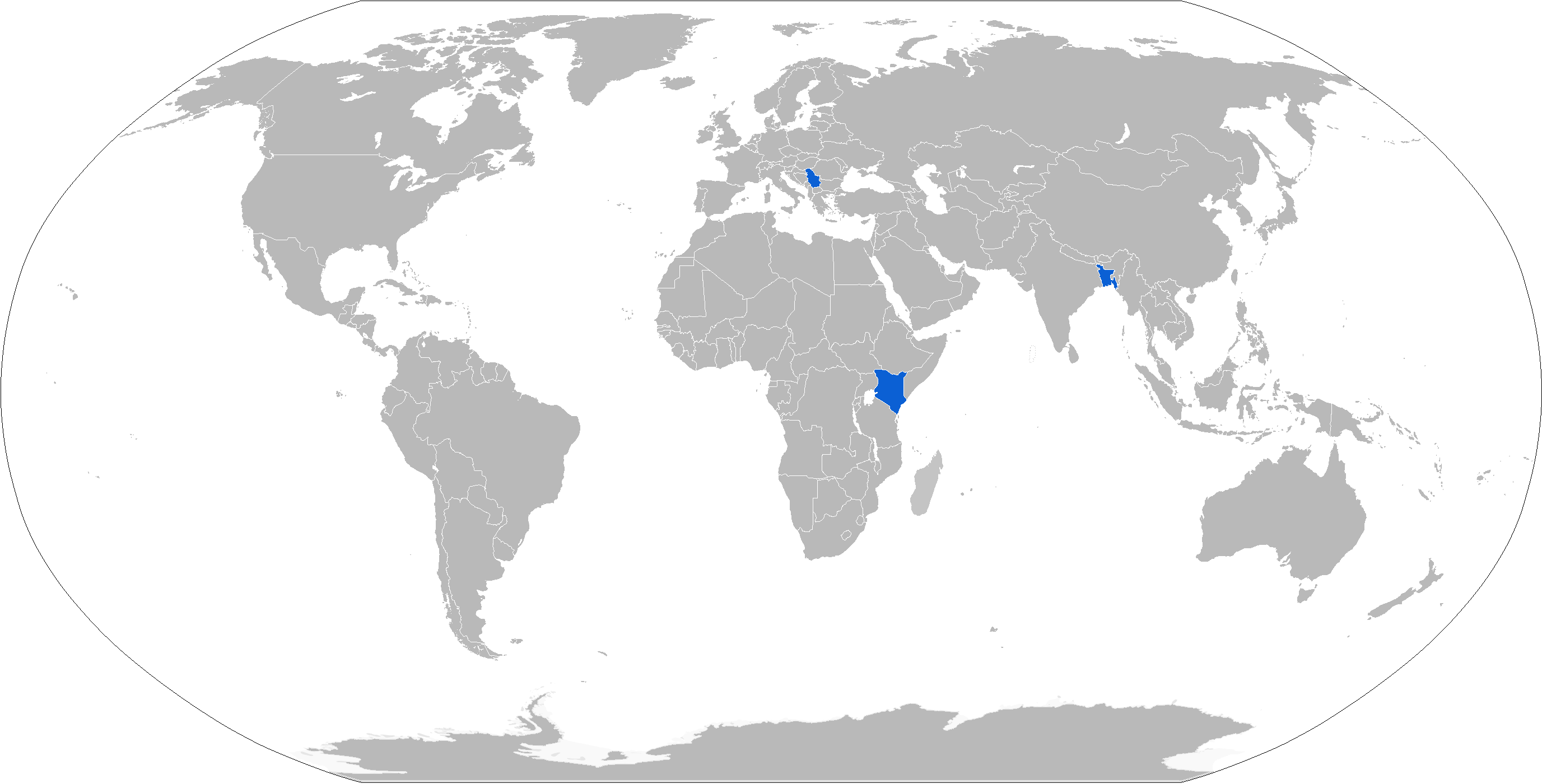
Map with Yugimport BOV M11 operators in blue

=== Current operators ===
- Bangladesh - Bangladesh Army operates 8+ vehicles.
- Cyprus - 20 ordered.
- Kenya - 10 ordered.
- Serbia - Gendarmery 12 in service.

== See also ==
- Cadillac Gage Commando
- M1117
