= BOV (armoured personnel carrier) =

BOV-VP (first generation)
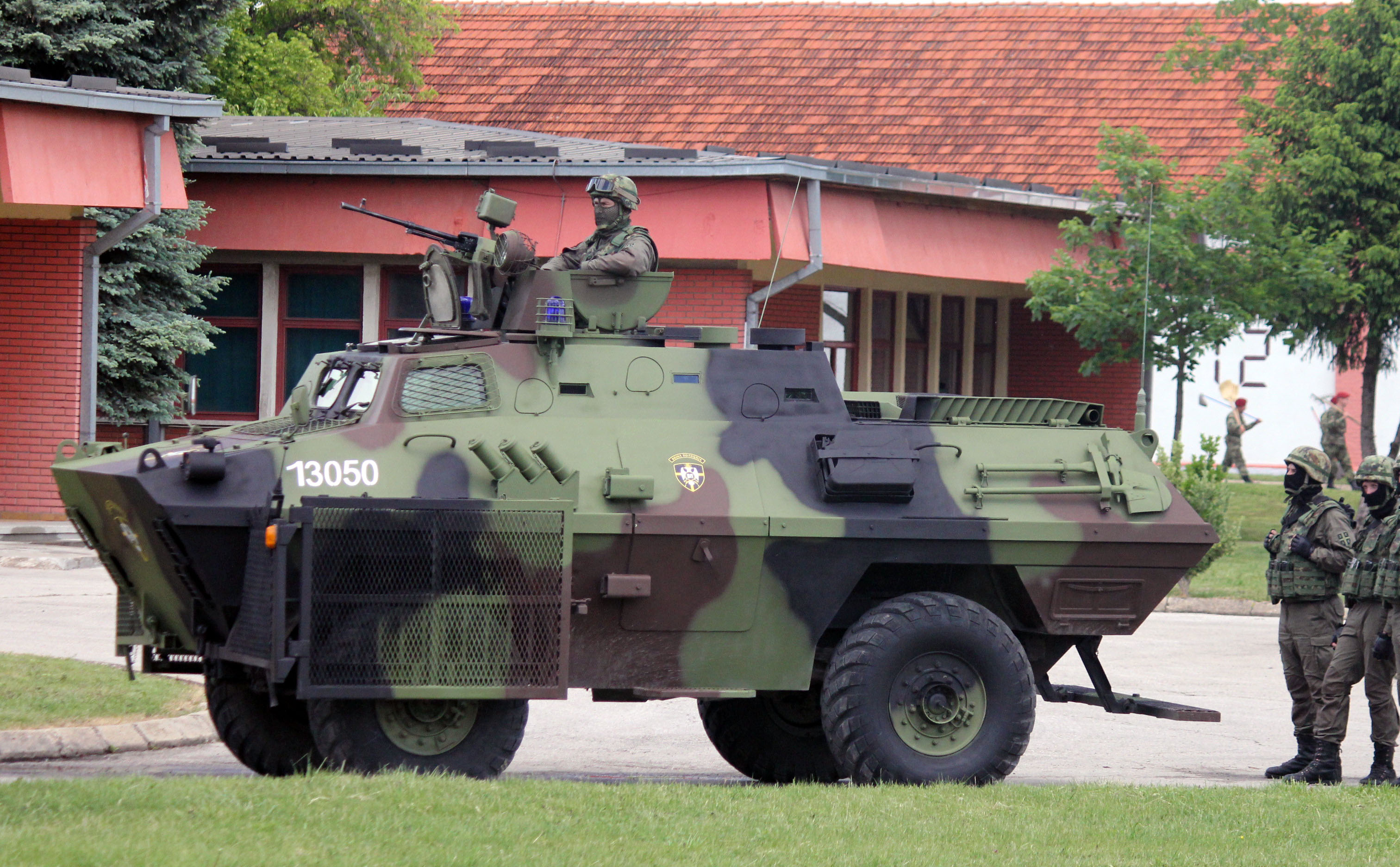
- BOV-VP
- Type: Armoured personnel carrier
- Place of origin: Yugoslavia

Service history
- In service: 1985–present
- Used by: See Operators
- Wars: Yugoslav Wars; Russian invasion of Ukraine

Production history
- Designer: Military Technical Institute
- Manufacturer: TAM, Fabrika automobila Priboj
- No. built: 565+
- Variants: BOV-1, BOV-3, BOV-VP

Specifications
- Mass: 9.1 tonnes
- Length: 5.7 m (18 ft 8 in)
- Width: 2.53 m (8 ft 4 in)
- Height: 2.84 m (9 ft 4 in)
- Crew: 2+8
- Armor: 10–15mm of steel STANAG 4569 level III+ front side for BOV M11 and BOV M15, level 1+ side and rear, BOV KIV level STANAG III+ all side, BOV OT Front STANAG 4569 level IV+ up to 20mm, side and rear STANAG 4569 level III+ up to 12.7mm
- Engine: Deutz F6L413 diesel engine 150 hp (110 kW) at 2650 rpm
- Power/weight: 25 hp/t
- Suspension: 4×4 wheeled
- Operational range: 500 km (300 mi)
- Maximum speed: 95 km/h (59 mph)

The BOV (Serbian: Борбено оклопно возило (БОВ), romanized: Borbeno oklopno vozilo (BOV), lit. 'Combat Armoured Vehicle'), is an all-wheel drive armoured vehicle manufactured in the former Yugoslavia and today in Serbia. The vehicle's second generation is currently in production.

== First generation ==
=== Description ===
The BOV has a capacity of 10, including a driver, gunner and eight infantrymen. The vehicle has a four-wheel drive and is powered by the Deutz type F 6L 413 F six-cylinder diesel engine developing 150 hp (110 kW) at 2,650 rpm.

=== Service history ===
The BOV was used for internal security and military duties. It was most commonly used by territorial defence units, in several variants equipped with machine guns, water cannons, smoke and tear gas dispensers for crowd control and riots.

The vehicle saw widespread use on the territory of the former Yugoslavia. At the beginning of the first riots in Slovenia and Croatia, military police units of the Yugoslav People's Army (JNA) often used BOVs that have mainly served to protect convoys of the JNA. Many aircraft were also shot down over Croatia by the BOV-3. Many BOVs were lost due to their weak armour protection. BOVs were also widely used during the Kosovo War by the Yugoslav Army and the Police of Serbia. In combination with T-55 tanks, M-80 infantry fighting vehicles and supported by infantry, the BOV-3 anti-aircraft variant was used to clear villages of the Kosovo Liberation Army.

Nowadays, the BOVs in the Serbian Armed Forces are used by the Military Police (BOV-VP) and in army mechanized armour battalions (BOV M83). BOVs are also used by the special police forces of Serbia, Republika Srpska, and the Federation of Bosnia and Herzegovina.

=== Variants ===
- BOV-1 – anti-tank missile launch vehicle armed with six AT-3 missiles; also known as BOV POLO (protivoklopno lansirno oruđe) M83.
- BOV-3 – air-defence version with a triple-barreled M55A4B1 20mm cannon housed in a rotating turret.
- BOV-30 – prototype air-defence vehicle with twin mounted 30mm guns.
- BOV-M – armoured personnel carrier for the Milicija. This version is armed with smoke-grenade launchers and a 7.62mm or 12.7mm machine gun.
- BOV-SN – ambulance version.
- BOV-VP – armoured personnel carrier for the military police.
- BOV-M86 – armoured personnel carrier, for a Special Anti-Terrorist Unit and Gendarmery, modernized with additional armour protection, but with no RWS installed (instead of which the vehicle has a turret with a 14.5mm heavy machine gun).

== Second generation ==
BOV M15 (second generation)
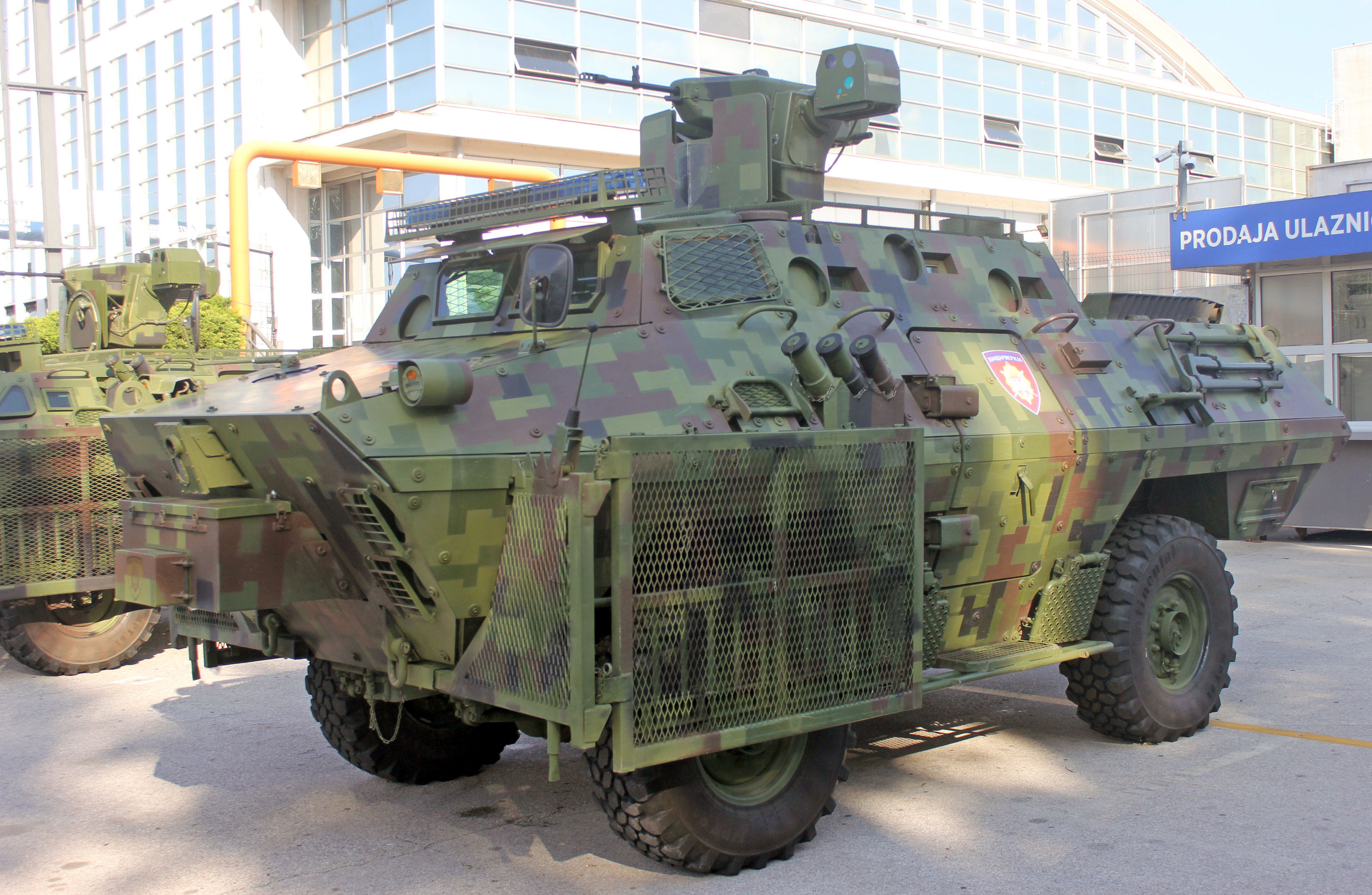
- BOV M15
- Type: Armoured personnel carrier
- Place of origin: Serbia

Service history
- Used by: See Operators

Production history
- Designer: Military Technical Institute
- Manufacturer: Fabrika automobila Priboj; Yugoimport SDPR
- Produced: 2016
- No. built: 20+
- Variants: BOV, Armoured personnel carrier, scout, command and others

Specifications
- Mass: 9.5 tonnes
- Length: 5.71 m (18 ft 9 in)
- Width: 2.53 m (8 ft 4 in)
- Height: 3.12 m (10 ft 3 in)
- Crew: 2+8
- Armor: Front STANAG 4569 level III+, STANAG 4569 level 1+ side and rear 5.56 to 7.62mm
- Main armament: (RCWS) 12.7 mm
- Secondary armament: grenade launcher
- Engine: CumminsIBS; 190HP
- Suspension: 4×4 wheeled - run-flat tires
- Operational range: 600 km
- Maximum speed: 95 km/h

BOV M11 (second generation)
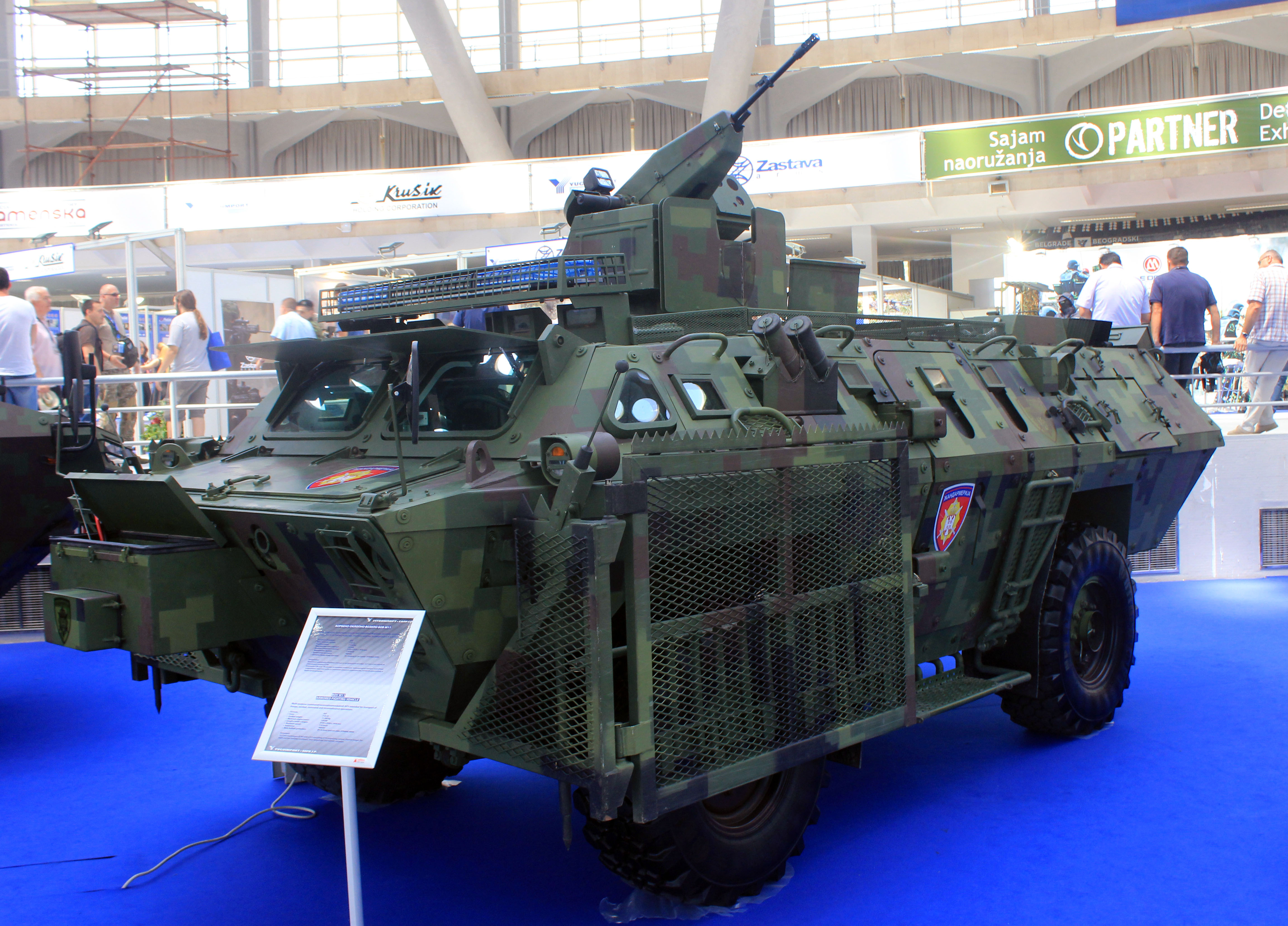
- BOV M11
- Type: Armoured personnel carrier
- Place of origin: Serbia

Service history
- Used by: See Operators

Production history
- Designer: Military Technical Institute
- Manufacturer: Fabrika automobila Priboj; Yugoimport SDPR
- Produced: 2016
- No. built: 30+
- Variants: BOV, Armoured personnel carrier, scout, command and others

Specifications
- Mass: 9.5 tonnes
- Length: 5.72 m (18 ft 9 in)
- Width: 2.53 m (8 ft 4 in)
- Height: 2.60 m (8 ft 6 in)
- Crew: 4+4
- Armor: Front STANAG 4569 level III+, STANAG 4569 level 1+ side and rear 5.56 to 7.62mm
- Main armament: (Manned) 12.7 mm Zastava machine-gun
- Secondary armament: 40mm grenade launcher
- Engine: CumminsIBS; 190HP
- Suspension: 4×4 wheeled - run-flat tires
- Operational range: 600 km
- Maximum speed: 100 km/h

BOV KIV (second generation)
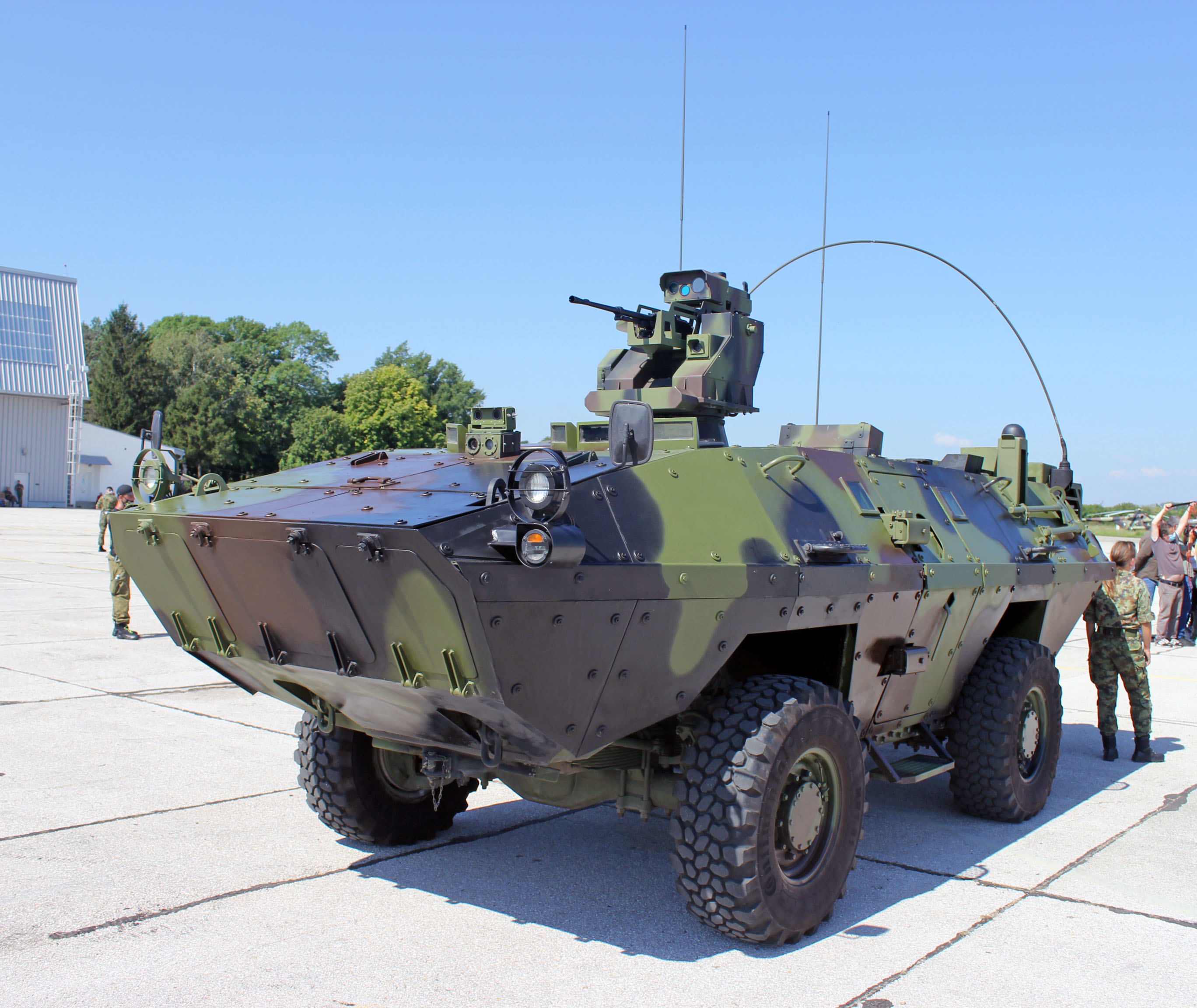
- BOV KIV
- Type: Armoured personnel carrier
- Place of origin: Serbia

Service history
- Used by: See Operators

Production history
- Designer: Military Technical Institute
- Manufacturer: Fabrika automobila Priboj; Yugoimport SDPR
- No. built: 20+
- Variants: BOV scout, command and others

Specifications
- Mass: 11.5 tonnes
- Length: 5.9 m (19 ft 4 in)
- Width: 2.53 m (8 ft 4 in)
- Height: 2.33 m (7 ft 8 in)
- Crew: 2+6
- Armor: STANAG 4569 level III+
- Main armament: (RCWS) 7.62 mm Zastava machine-gun
- Secondary armament: 40mm grenade launcher
- Engine: Cummins ISB 6.7; 285HP
- Suspension: 4×4 wheeled - run-flat tires
- Operational range: 600 km
- Maximum speed: 100 km/h

BOV OT (second generation)
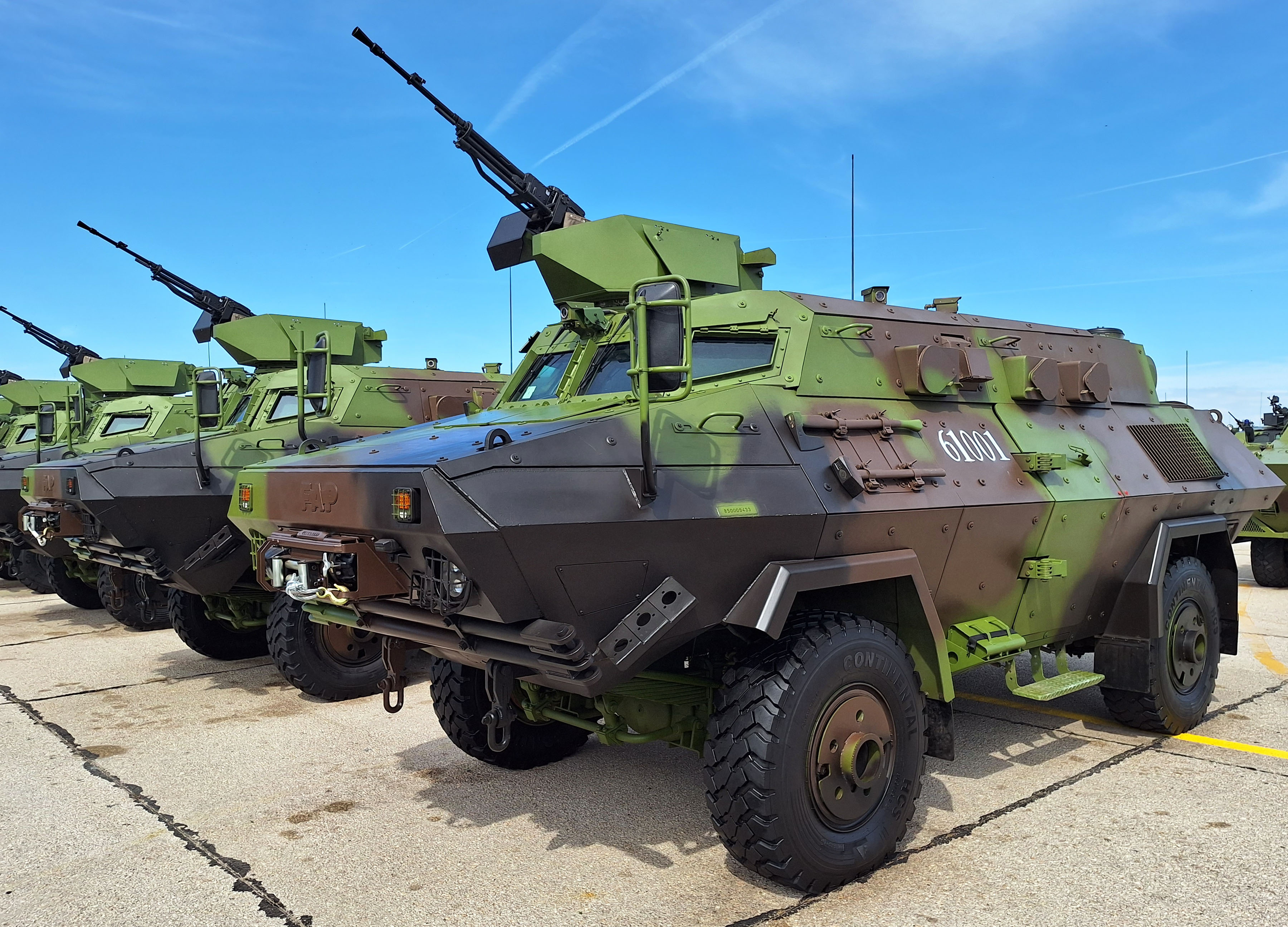
- BOV OT
- Type: Armoured personnel carrier
- Place of origin: Serbia

Service history
- Used by: See Operators

Production history
- Designer: Military Technical Institute
- Manufacturer: Fabrika automobila Priboj; Yugoimport SDPR
- Produced: 2023
- No. built: 10+
- Variants: BOV armoured personnel carrier, command and others

Specifications
- Mass: 13.5 tonnes
- Length: 6.70 m (22 ft 0 in)
- Width: 2.60 m (8 ft 6 in)
- Height: 2.84 m (9 ft 4 in)
- Crew: 3+7
- Armor: Front STANAG 4569 level IV+ up to 20mm, side and rear STANAG 4569 level III+ up to 12.7mm
- Main armament: 12.7 mm
- Secondary armament: grenade launcher
- Engine: Cummins ISB 6.7; 285HP
- Transmission: Allison 3000 6+1 Automatic
- Suspension: 4×4 wheeled - run-flat tires
- Operational range: 1,100 km
- Maximum speed: 110 km/h

=== Description ===
The second generation BOV is currently in serial production by Yugoimport SDPR. It has a new four-wheel drive and is powered by the Cummins diesel engine. It weighs about 11 tons, and has a new transmission, new communications devices and protects the crew against 12.7mm caliber guns and all anti-armour land mines. The second generation BOV also has integrated air-conditioning and an independent battery power source that enables all functions without the engine needing to be turned on, thus enabling silent operation. Several variants are planned, including command, reconnaissance, military police and armoured personnel carrier configurations. Current known versions are armed with RCWS consisting of 7.62mm Zastava machine-gun and 40 mm grenade launcher or 12.7mm Zastava manned turret. Scout versions have mast with high-resolution day and night cameras, data link to transmit all information in real time to command center. Command versions have additional internal posts with displays for viewing tactical situation. It can carry up to six soldiers in the scout and armoured personnel carrier configurations.

=== Variants ===
- BOV M10 – armoured vehicle for artillery systems command and control.
- BOV M11 – armoured reconnaissance vehicle.
- BOV M15 – armoured personnel carrier for the military police based on BOV-VP with new engine, transmission, run-flat tires, remote controlled weapon station (RCWS) with a 12.7 mm machine gun and better armour protection.
- HS M09 BOV-3 – hybrid air-defense system based on BOV-3 with 8 x Strela-2 SAMs mounted on turret.
- MRČKB BOV-3 – mobile radio communication for battalion commander integrated in to BOV-3 vehicle.
- BOV KIV – command and reconnaissance modernized armoured vehicle; first batch of 10 vehicles introduced to the Serbian Armed Forces in 2020.
- BOV OT – armoured personnel carrier, command and others; first batch of 10 vehicles introduced to the Serbian Armed Forces in 2020.

==== BOV armoured personnel carrier ====
The BOV M15 is an armoured combat vehicle created from a significant modernization and modification of the BOV-VP. It is mainly intended for all types of police units, such as the Military Police and the Gendarmery. The BOV M15 is primarily designed to perform both police and military tasks. Unlike its previous basic version, the BOV-VP, which was designed and constructed in the former Yugoslavia, they were removed and through deep modernization almost all segments of the vehicle were raised to a higher level. The main shortcoming of the BOV-M86 was armoured protection that proved weak during the wars in the former Yugoslavia. The BOV M15 remained on the same chassis as its predecessor, which is the chassis of the TAM-110 military truck.

Protection: The protection is significantly enhanced on the BOV M15 in contrast to the basic version, and amounts to:

Armoured protection: Front protection: STANAG 4569 level III+ (protection against 12.7mm armour-piercing bullet ammunition)

Protection from all sides: STANAG 4569 level I (Protection against 5.56 mm caliber ammunition and all types of shooting ammunition with ordinary grains).

Anti-mine protection: It enables protection of the crew in the event of an explosion of an anti-tank mine containing 2 kg of explosives under the floor of the vehicle. It enables protection of the crew from the explosion of an anti-tank mine containing 4 kg of explosive under the wheels of the vehicle.

Drive: The BOV-M15 is equipped with a Cummins IBS190 engine (190 HP). The vehicle is characterized by excellent on-road and off-road mobility. It has run-flat tires which enable it to reach speeds of up to 50 km even in the event of a puncture or other damage.

Armament: It is equipped with a remotely controlled combat station (RWS), which consists of a 12.7 mm machine gun and a fire control system.

The fire control system consists of the main elements such as: high magnification TV cameras, thermal imaging camera, laser range finder. The RWS is operated by the gunner, i.e. the operator who is in the passenger seat, among the equipment used by the gunner there is also a ballistic computer, a suitable display, as well as a joystick or control stick. The machine gun can be used in manual mode, in case of failure or damage to the automatic. The effectiveness of the RWS, i.e. the effective range of the machine gun is: up to 1.5 km in the air, as well as 2 km on targets on the ground. The firing rate is about 600 rounds/min, while the capacity of the ammunition box is 180 rounds.

==== BOV scout vehicle ====
The BOV M11 is part of the BOV family of light armoured vehicles. BOV M11 is a vehicle specialized for reconnaissance.

BOV M11 has a main role as a reconnaissance vehicle and a command-reconnaissance vehicle. If used in artillery, it can be used for observation and to direct fire. This vehicle has a crew of three, including a driver, a commander and a gunner. The car has wheels and is powered by a diesel engine, more specifically 190HP. It has many special reconnaissance systems and artillery systems, built for a specific mission or role.

Equipment for the artillery-reconnaissance vehicle includes: artillery electronic direction finder (AEG), communication equipment, artillery battery FCS computer

Armoured protection is modular and made of armoured steel. Front protection is STANAG 4569 level III+ (protection against 12.7mm bulletproof ammunition); protection from all sides is STANAG 4569 level I (protection against 5.56 mm caliber ammunition and all types of shooting ammunition with ordinary grains); anti-mine protection enables protection of the crew in the event of an explosion of an anti-tank mine containing 2 kg of explosives under the floor of the vehicle as well as in the event of an explosion of an anti-tank mine containing 4 kg of explosives under the wheels of the vehicle.

The driving force is the Cummins IBS190 diesel engine (190 HP) and the ZTF transmission, which enables it to have very high mobility on off-road terrain.

It is equipped with a remotely controlled combat station (RCWS), which consists of a 12.7 mm machine gun and a fire control system. The fire control system consists of the main elements such as high magnification TV cameras, thermal imaging camera, and laser range finder. The RWS is operated by the gunner, i.e. the operator who is in the passenger seat, among the equipment used by the gunner there is also a ballistic computer, a suitable display, as well as a joystick or control stick. The machine gun can be used in manual mode, in case of failure or damage to the automatic. The effectiveness of the RCWS, i.e. the effective range of the machine gun is: up to 1.5 km in the air, as well as 2 km to targets on the ground. The firing rate is about 600 rounds per minute, the capacity of the ammunition box is 180 rounds.

The vehicle has four permanent crew members, namely: the driver, the gunner, the commander and the loader, as well as four dismounts (version for the Gendarmerie). The loader is able to use a manual machine gun in the event of breakdown or damage, while being protected by (RCWS) ballistic protection. The driver is equipped with TV cameras as well as television front and rear, which allows him to drive undisturbed due to reduced visibility. The vehicle is also equipped with external folding lattice fences, it has the ability to transport additional members of the example for the Gendarmerie on certain external platforms on the vehicle. It also has a smoke box launcher system, for masking and other special purpose needs. The vehicle is equipped with sound and light signaling systems, air conditioning, radio connection, computer for command and information software. A box for spare parts and hand tools are placed on the outside.

==== BOV scout vehicle ====
BOV KIV is a Serbian command-reconnaissance armoured vehicle. The vehicle manufacturer is FAP.

The vehicle was created as a product of the BOV-3 modernization, and was developed by the Military Technical Institute. It is produced by FAP. It was presented in 2016, and in 2020 it entered the service of the Serbian Army.

The crew consists of six people, whose composition depends on the BOV KIV variant. The basis of the BOV KIV vehicle is characterized by a high degree of ballistic protection, obtained by installing a new generation of modular armour.

The vehicles were also fitted with new undercarriages of increased load capacity with reinforced suspension. The platform is equipped with a weapons subsystem with a remotely controlled combat station (RCWS) 7.62/40 mm, which consists of a 7.62 mm machine gun and a 40 mm automatic grenade launcher.

For the purposes of command, the BOV KIV is equipped with appropriate modern telecommunication and IT equipment, as a basis for the formation of command and information systems.

The vehicle is also equipped with a 5 kW diesel generator for powering the equipment and systems inside the vehicle. This independent power supply is used when the main engine is not running. Since the crew in KIV is exposed to long-term work, the improvement of the platform also provides an air conditioning and heating system, which enables the crew to work smoothly in conditions of high and low temperatures.

The system for improving the driver's visualization consists of two television cameras, a thermal imaging camera and an image display system. Television cameras project the image in the eyepieces and with their setting enable a 3D presentation, that is, the driver gets an idea of the depth of the scene.

Variants Command vehicle of the infantry battalion commander command-reconnaissance vehicle of the commander of the artillery division the command-reconnaissance vehicle commands the artillery batteries reconnaissance vehicle of the commander of the reconnaissance department.

==== BOV armoured personnel carrier ====
The BOV OT M21 is an armoured personnel carrier with anti-mine protection, intended for the safe transportation of 10 people on all types of terrain and in all weather and tactical conditions.

It is a vehicle created by extensive refinement of the BOV armoured transporter variant, and the works are carried out at the FAP factory in Priboj.

It is armed with a mechanically operated 12.7mm combat station. With armoured protection for the shooter, it also has 6 side loopholes for shooting weapons from the vehicle.

It has a Cummins ISB 6.7 EU 3 engine, with a power of 210 kilowatts (285 horsepower). The gearbox is Allison 3000, seven-speed (6+1), automatic. The drive of the vehicle is on all four wheels (4x4), and it is possible to block all three differentials.

The vehicle has ballistic protection that shields against 20 mm projectiles from the front and 12.7 mm from the sides.

== Operators ==
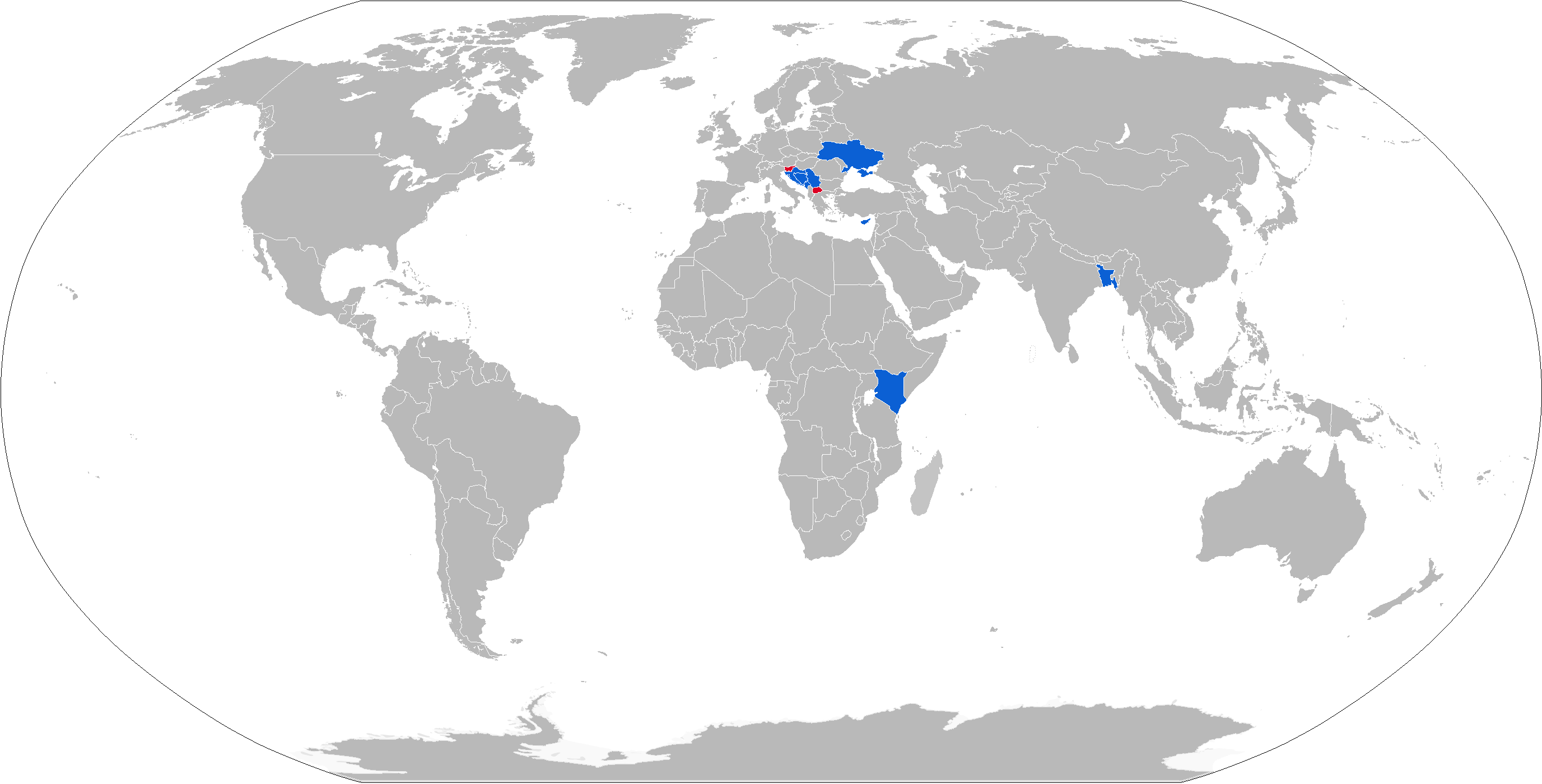
Map of BOV operators in blue with former operators in red

=== Current operators ===
- Bangladesh – 8 BOV M11 (acquired from Serbia)
- Bosnia and Herzegovina - 32 BOV-1
- Croatia – 33 BOV-3, 20 BOV-1, and 6 BOV-VP
- Cyprus – 20 BOV M11 (acquired from Serbia)
- Kenya – 10 BOV M11 (acquired from Serbia)
- Montenegro – 8 BOV-VP, 10 BOV-1
- Serbia – 130 in service with the Serbian Armed Forces (10 BOV OT, 20 BOV KIV, 48 BOV-1 POLO M83, 52 BOV-VP) and 42 in service with the Police of Serbia (12 BOV M11, 6 BOV M15, 22 BOV M86 and 2 BOV-3)
- Ukraine – 26, of which 20 BOV-M and 6 BOV-3 (donated by Slovenia)

=== Former operators ===
- Republic of Bosnia and Herzegovina
- Slovenia
- Yugoslavia
- Serbia and Montenegro

== Gallery ==
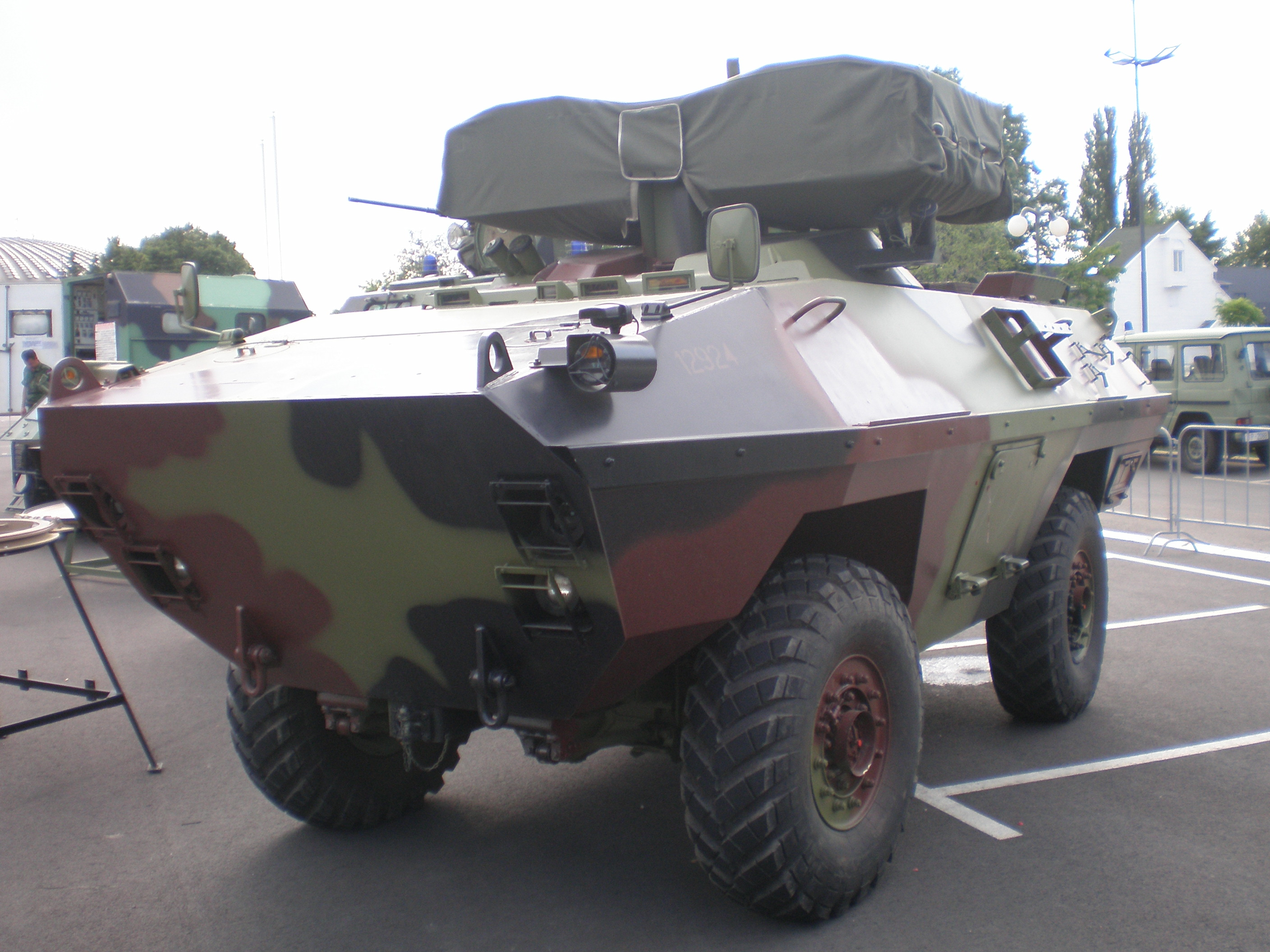
BOV-1 anti-tank vehicle

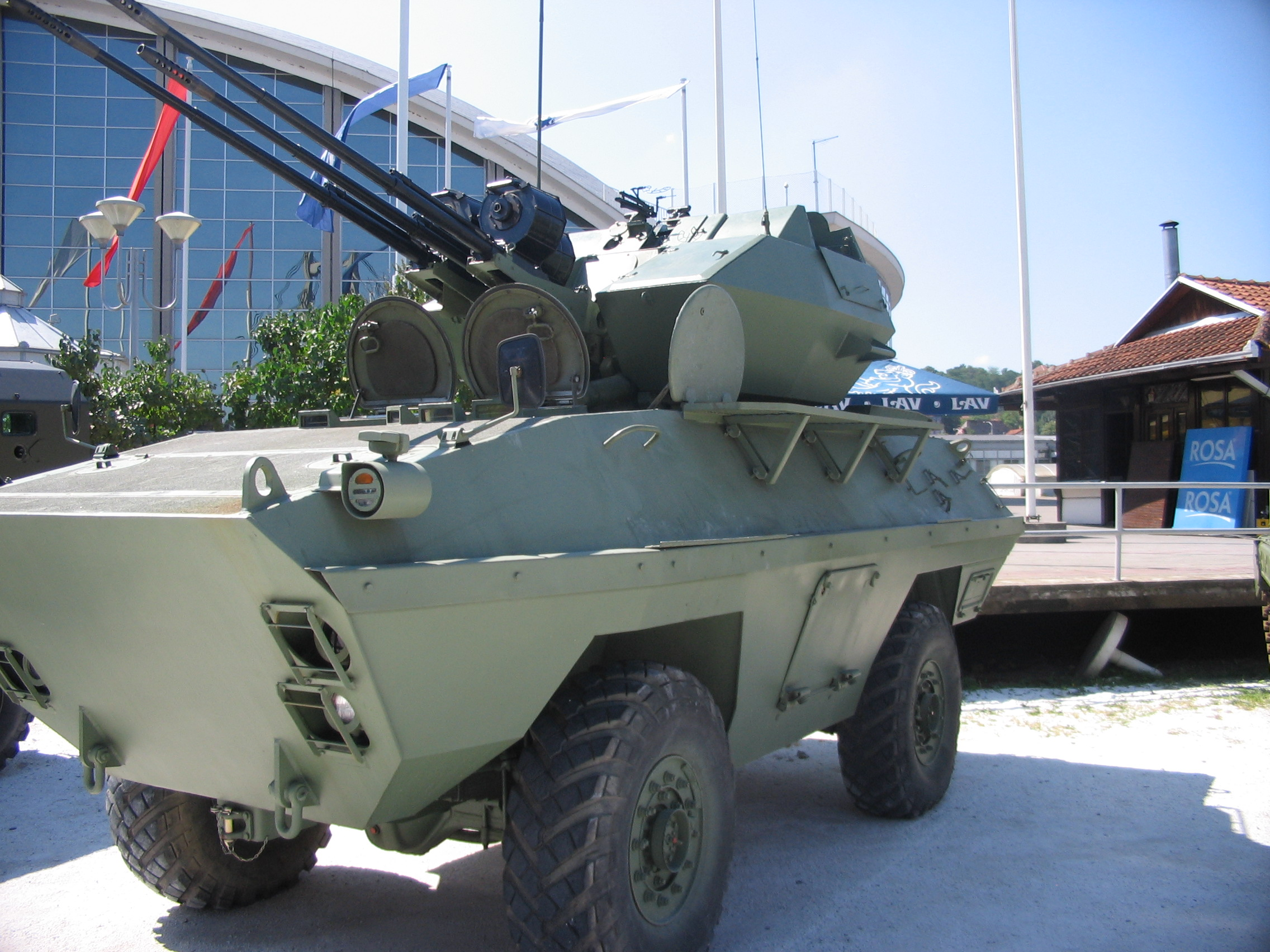
BOV-3 anti-aircraft vehicle

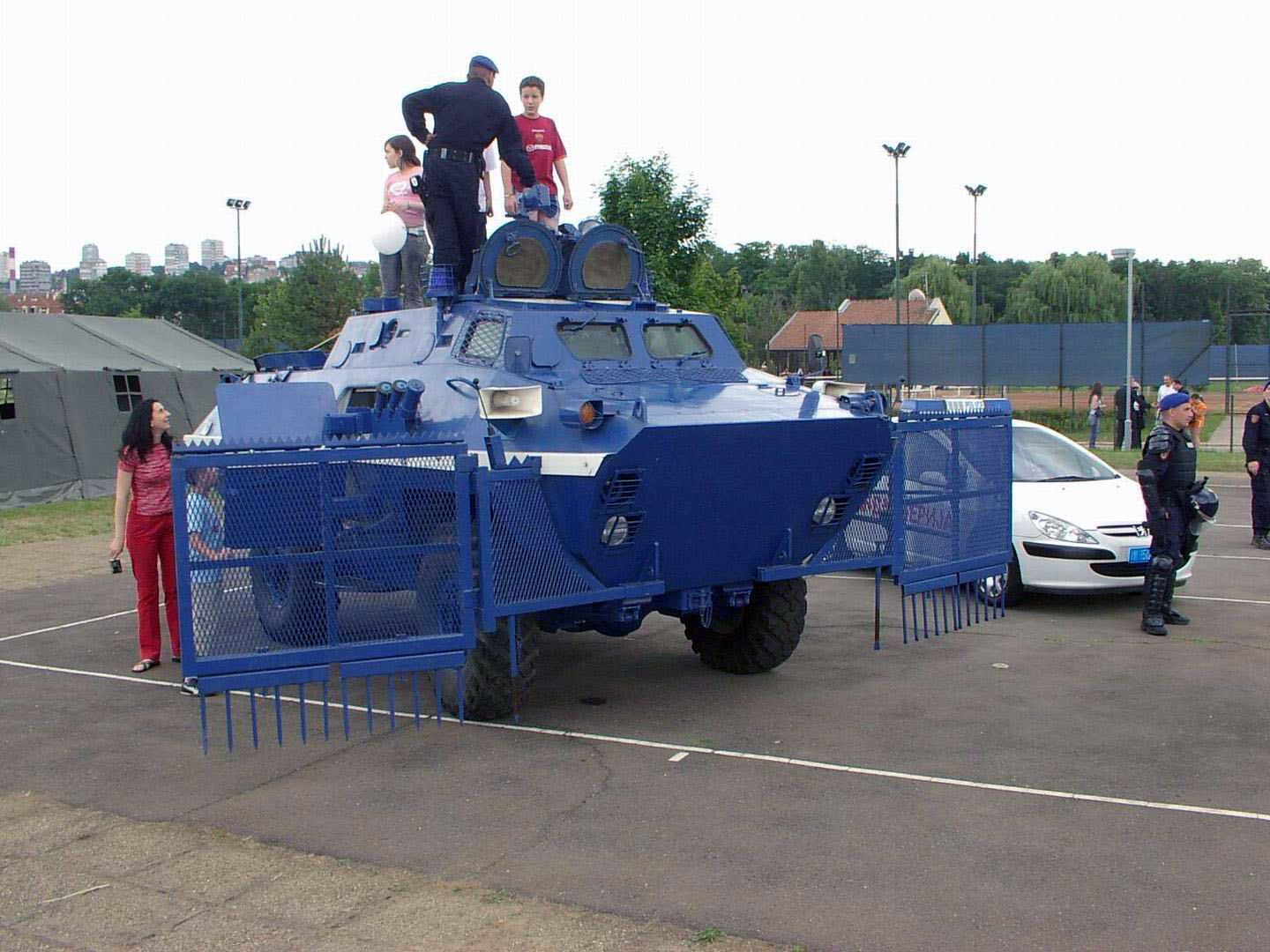
BOV-M riot control vehicle

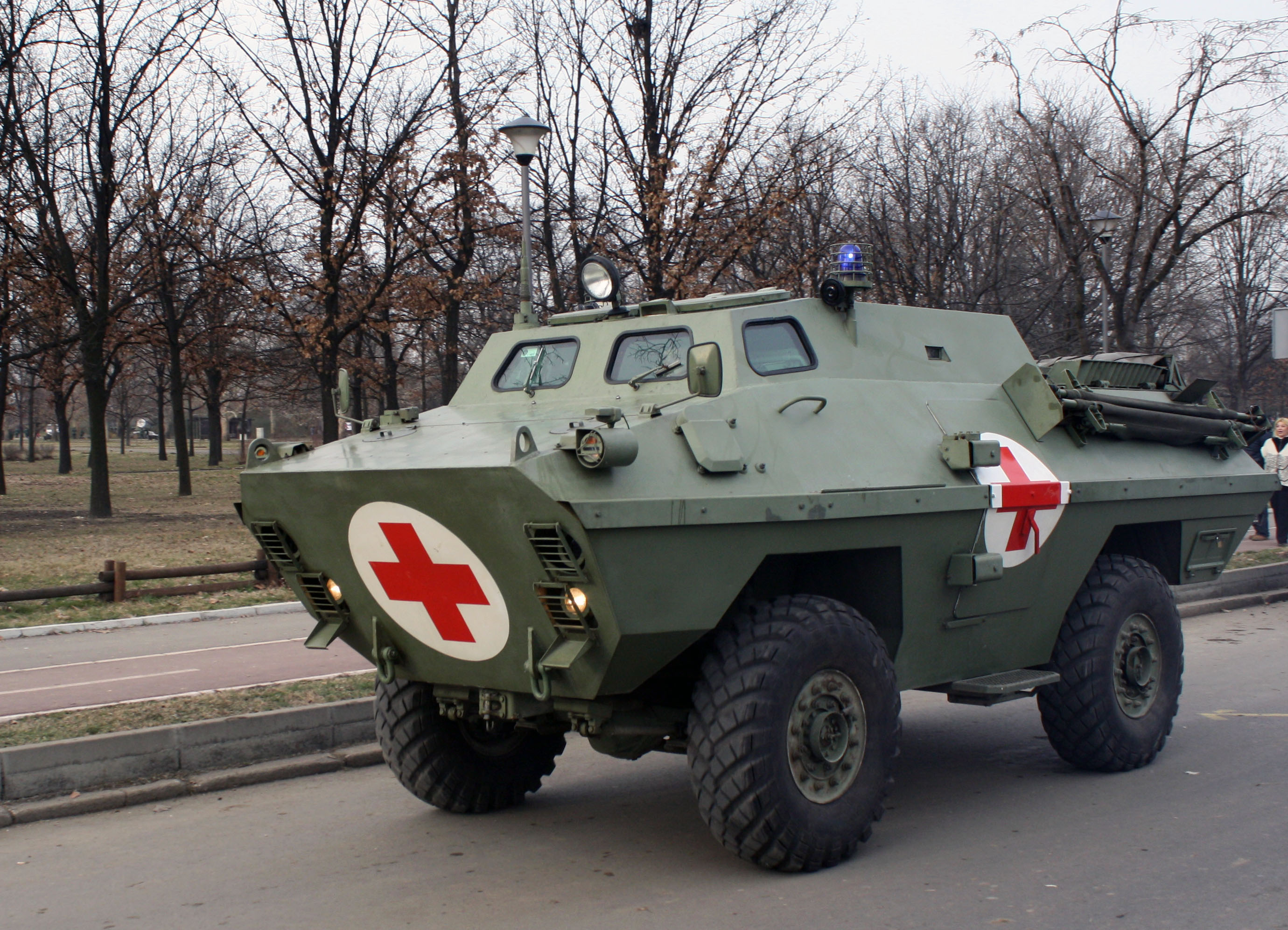
BOV-SN armoured ambulance

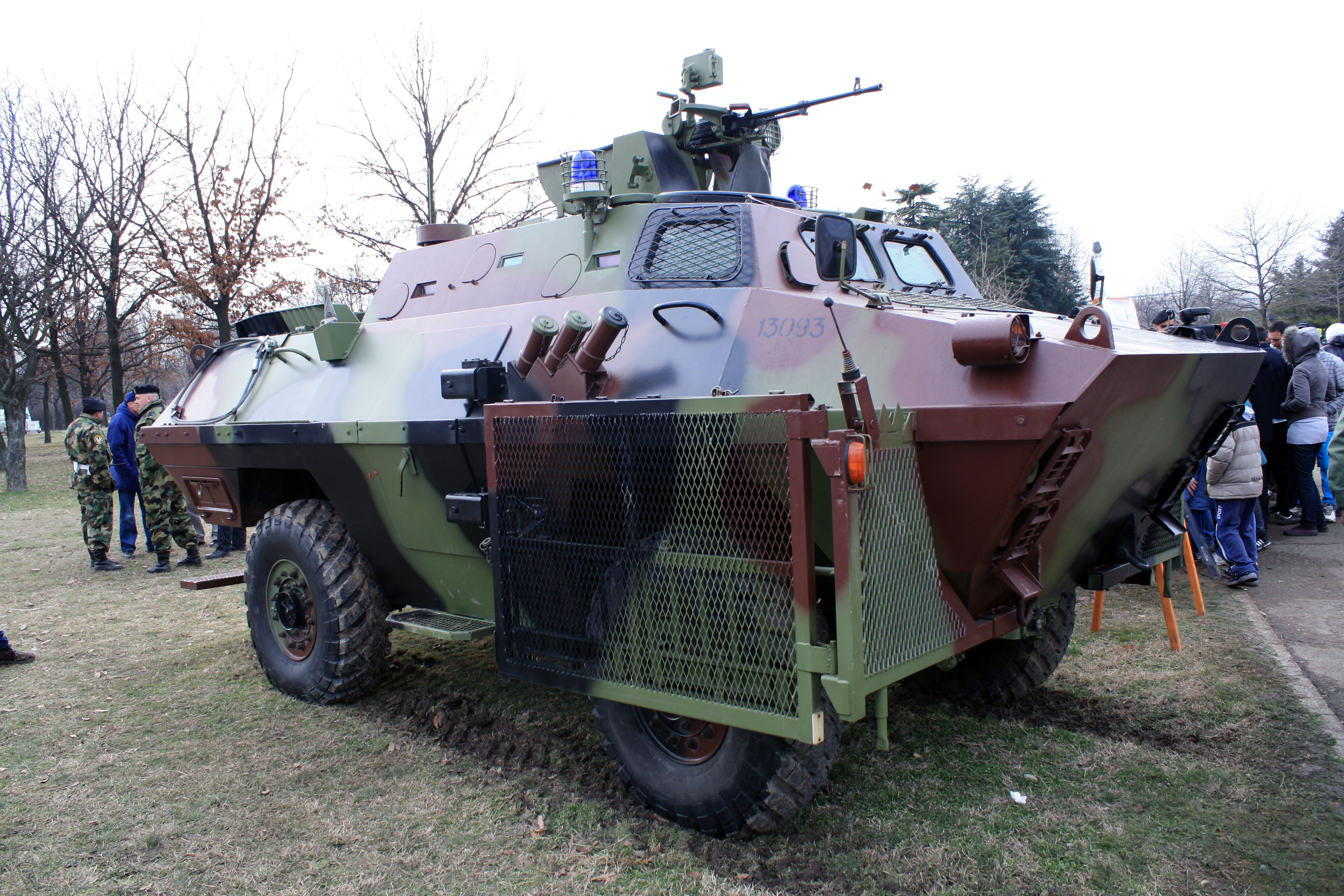
BOV-VP armoured personnel carrier for military police

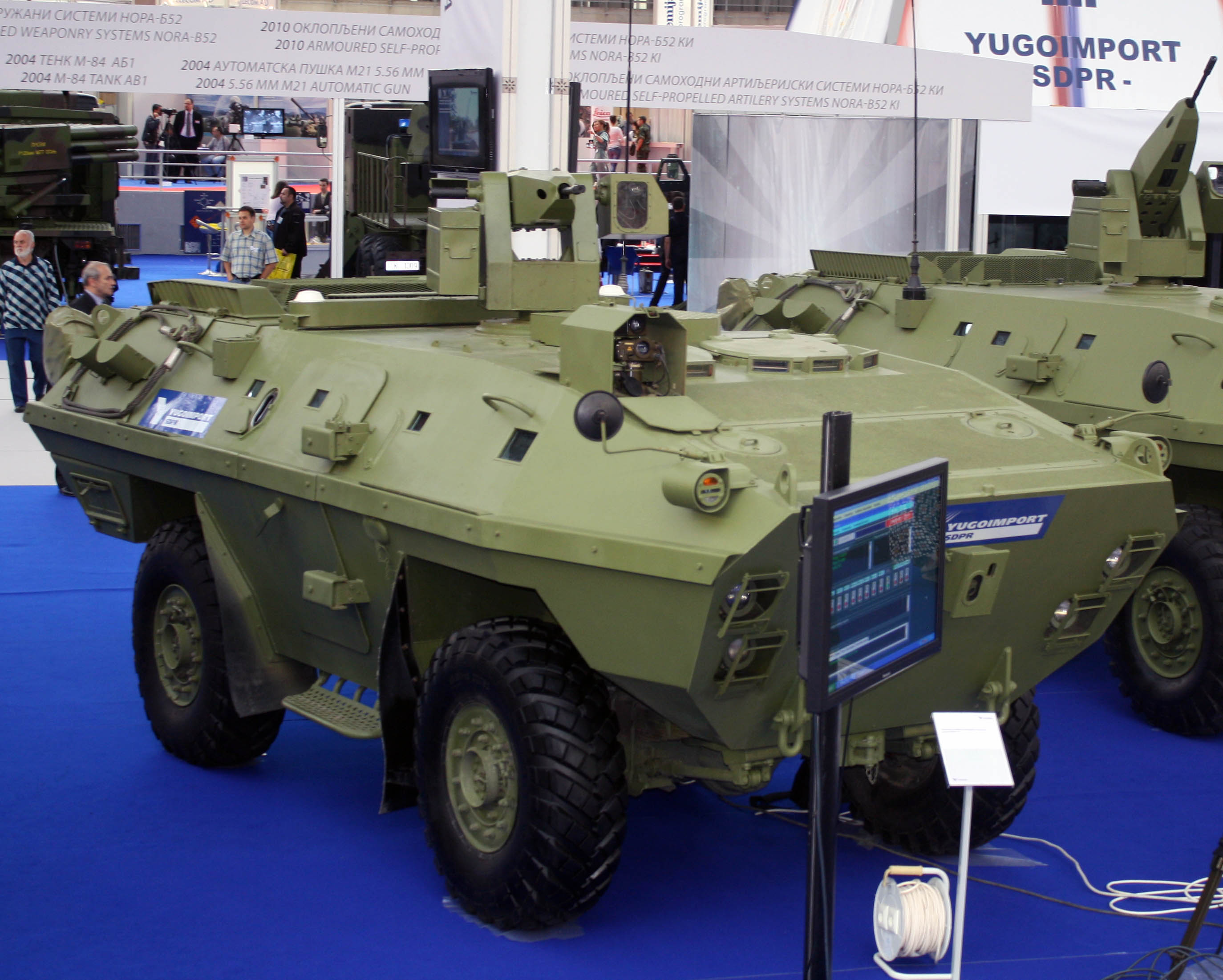
BOV M10 command vehicle for artillery systems

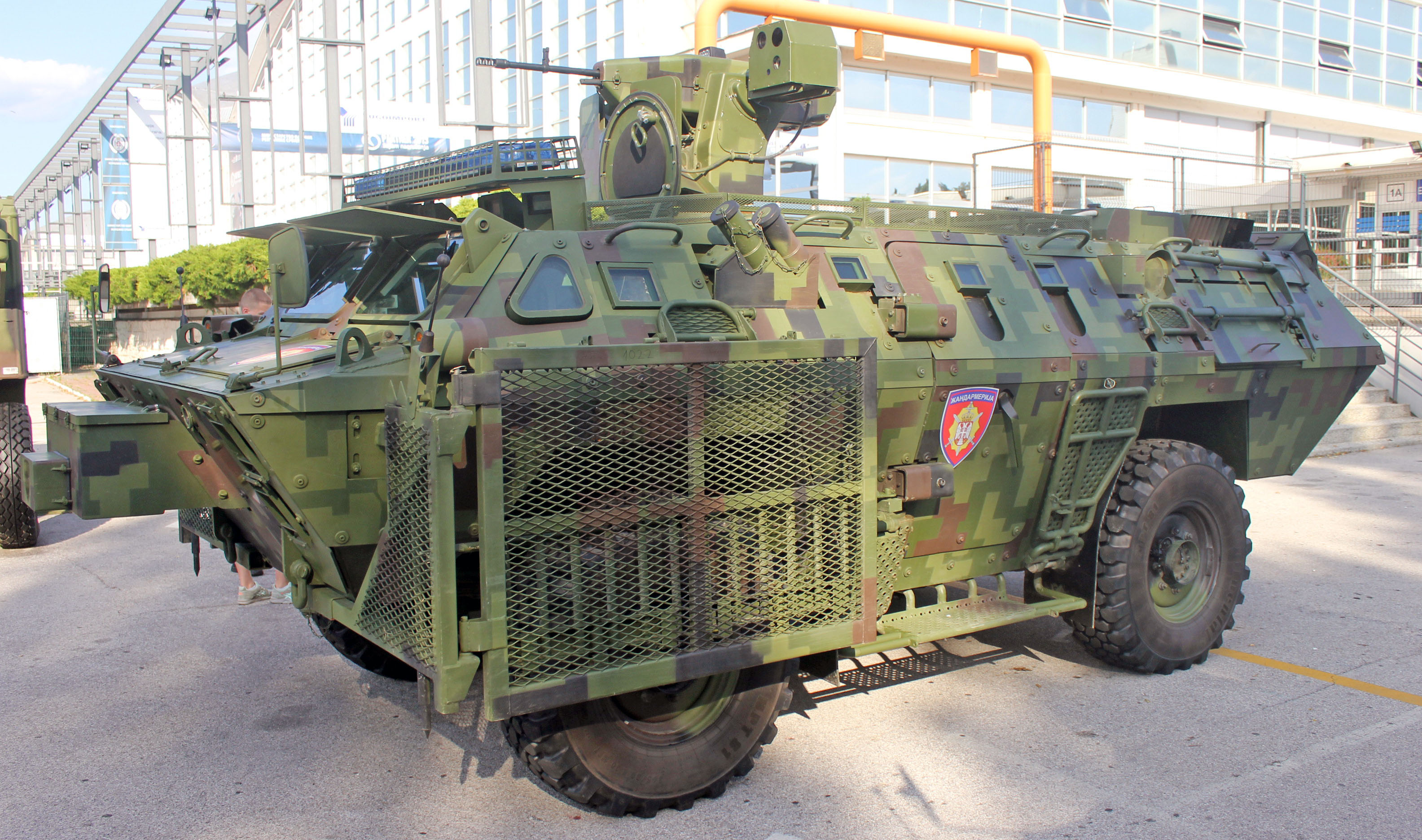
BOV M11

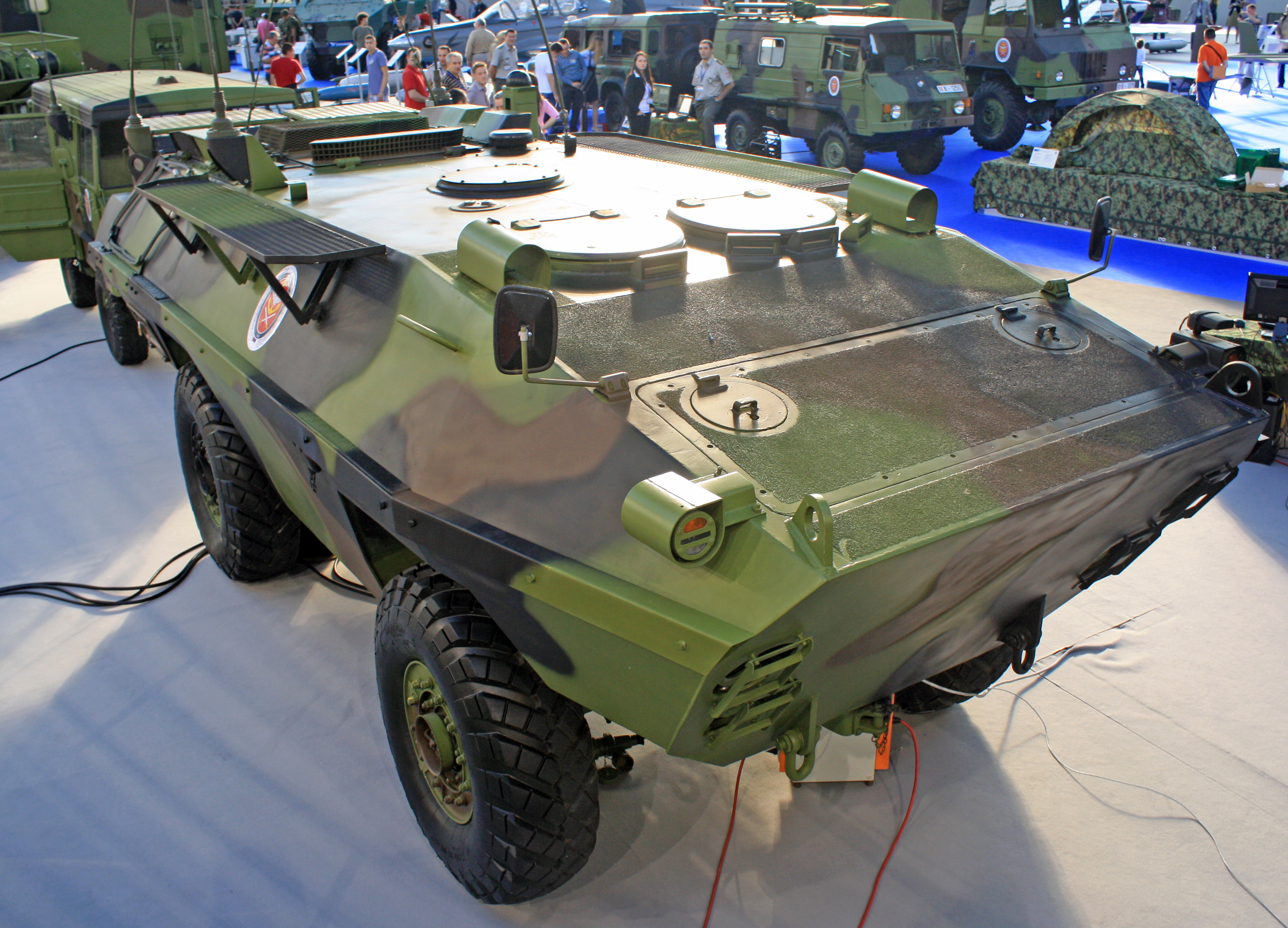
MRČKB BOV-3

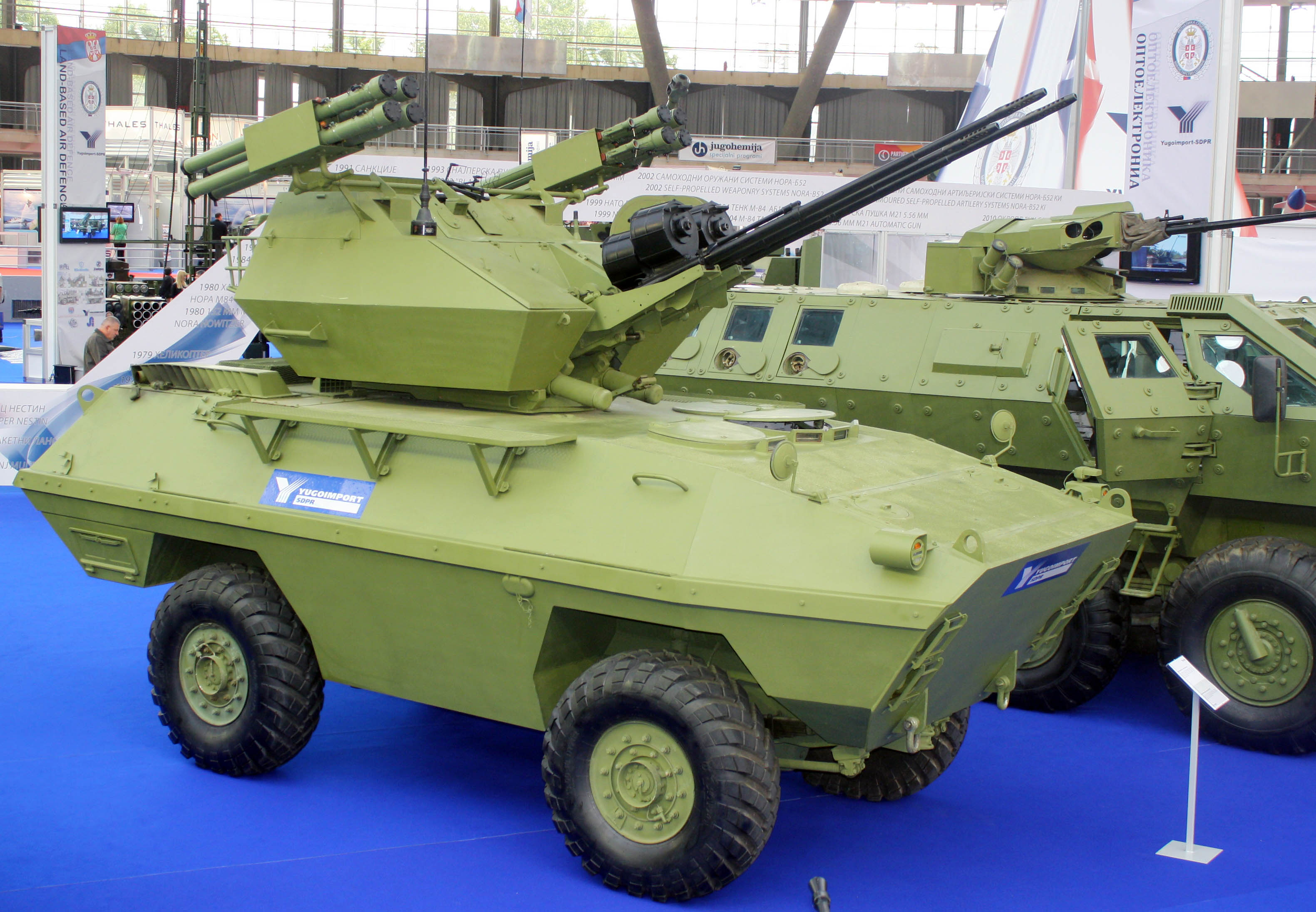
HS M09 BOV-3

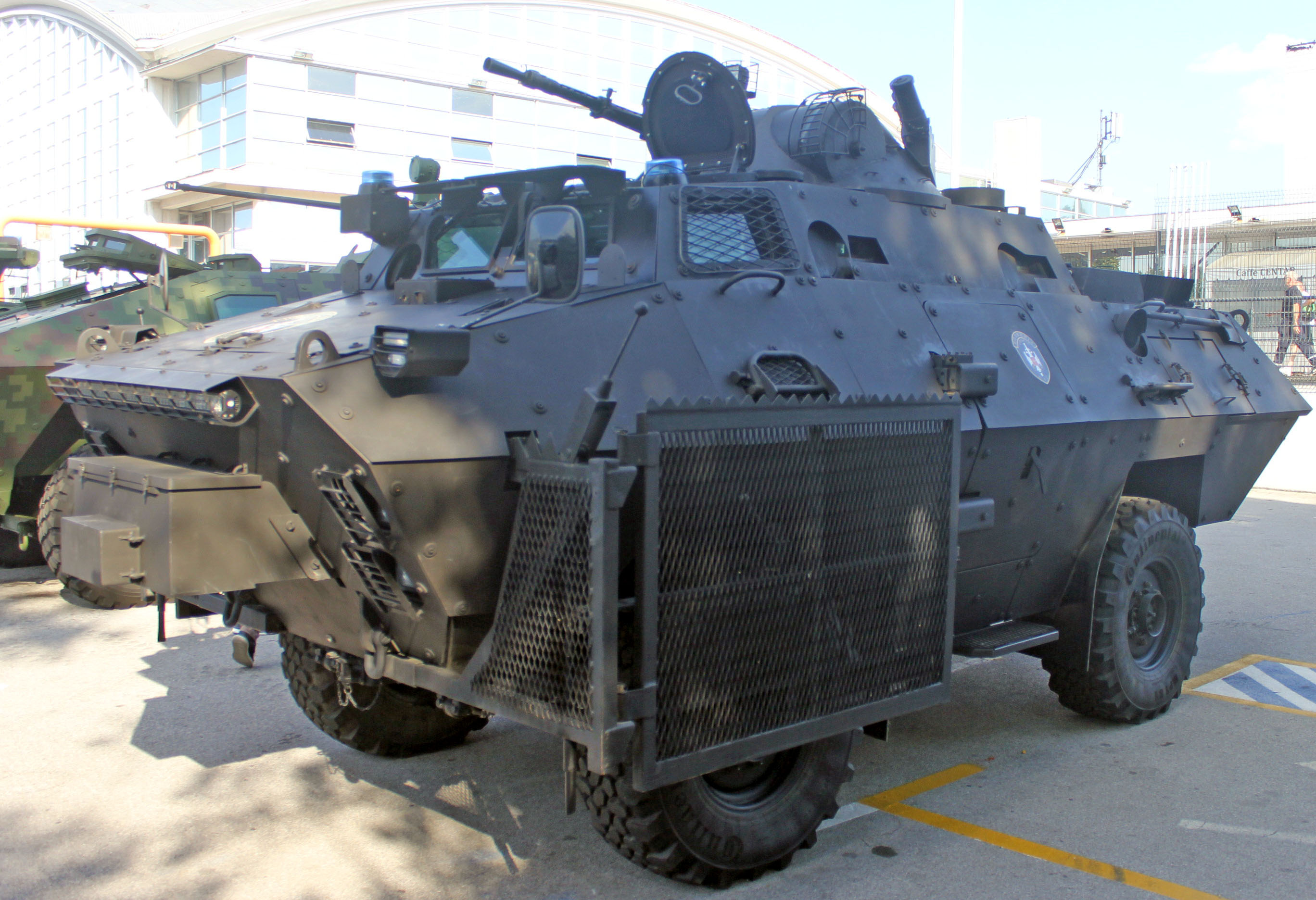
BOV M86 armoured personnel carrier

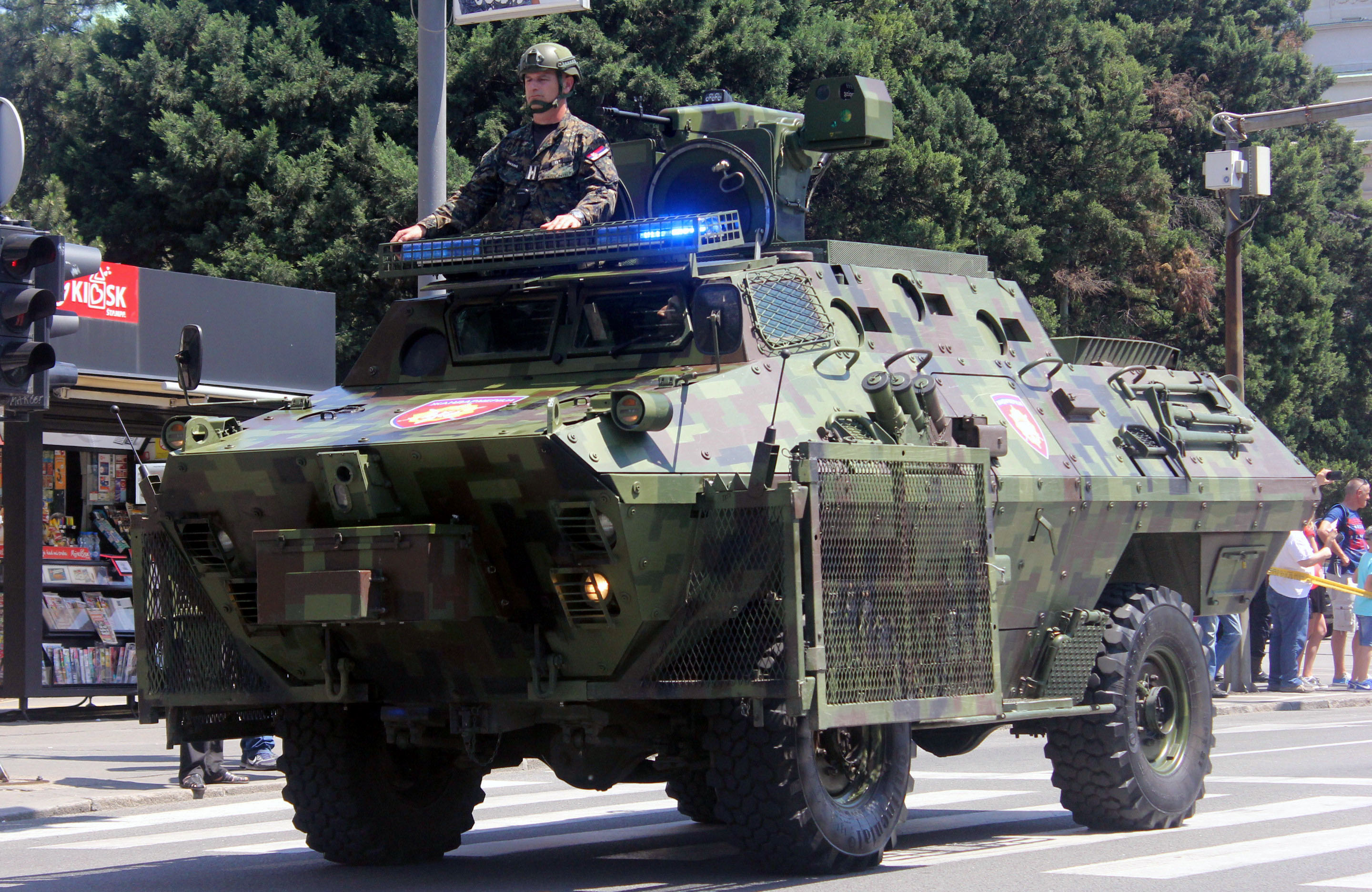
BOV M15 armoured personnel carrier

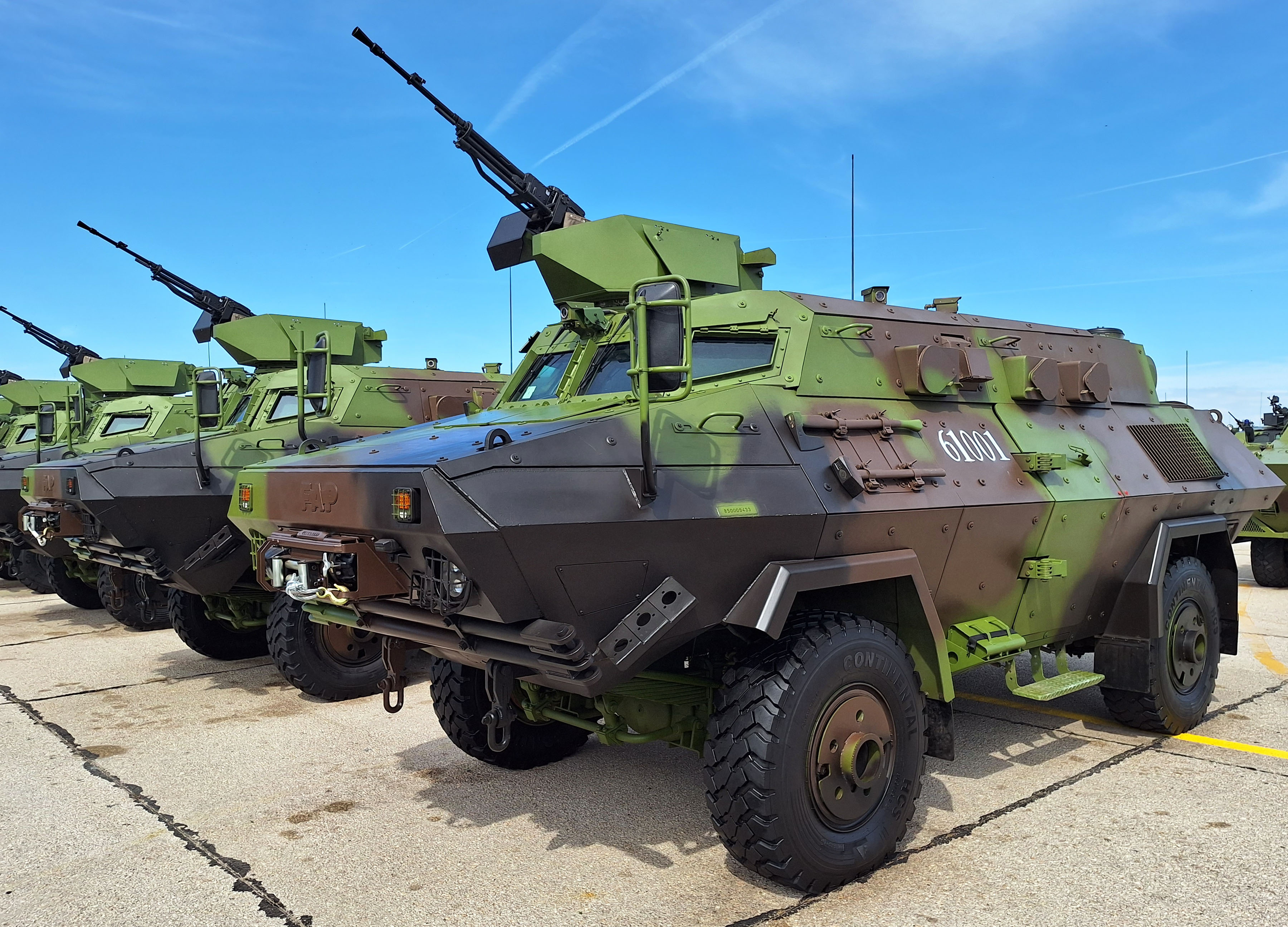
BOV OT armoured personnel carrier

== See also ==
- Lists of armoured fighting vehicles
