= Rapier Unmanned Helicopter =

Rapier

General information
- Type: Unmanned combat aerial vehicle
- National origin: Serbia
- Manufacturer: EdePro
- Designer: EdePro
- Status: Developing
- Number built: 1+

History
- Developed from: 2015

The Rapier is an unmanned autonomous helicopter that can provide reconnaissance, surveillance, situational awareness, electronic warfare, aerial fire support and precision targeting support for ground, air and sea forces. VTOL (Vertical Take Off Landing) helicopters are more comfortable for use- take off and land vertically on any kind of terrain (small ships or even vehicles), there is no need for a runway, there is more possibility for monitoring and recording.

The helicopter is designed to carry various payloads such as radar systems, radar confusion transmissions, surveillance equipment (color TV camera, low light level TV camera, thermal imaging camera, laser target designation) and even weapons.

== See also ==
- Pegaz 011
- High Speed Target Drone
- IAI Scout
- AAI RQ-7 Shadow
