= EDePro =

Serbian defense company

- Native name: ЕДеПро
- Industry: Defense
- Founded: 11 February 1997; 29 years ago (Current form)
- Headquarters: Kralja Milutina 33, Belgrade, Serbia
- Key people: Slobodan Petković (Director)
- Services: Research and development in other natural and technical-technological sciences
- Revenue: ▲€82.24 million (2025)
- Net income: ▲€1.71 million (2025)
- Total assets: ▲€83.50 million (2023)
- Total equity: ▲€2.58 million (2025)
- Owner: Branislav Jojić (39.2%); Milivoje Popović (19.6%); Momčilo Šljukić (19.6%); Slobodan Petković (19.6%); Yugoimport SDPR (2%)
- Number of employees: 446 (2025)
- Website: edepro.com
- Footnotes; Business ID: 17157132; Tax ID: 100302066

EDePro (Engine Development and Production) is a Serbian company which develops solid rockets, turbojet powered missiles, and the production of energetic materials.

== History ==
EDePro was founded in 1985 at the Faculty of Mechanical Engineering of the University of Belgrade.

== Products ==
=== Artillery Base Bleed Units ===
- R-107 mm - The “107” multiple rocket system is an anti-personnel weapon developed for light artillery, infantry and special forces units. EDePro rocket “107-ER” is fully compatible with the multiple rocket launcher systems used for the original rocket.
- R122 mm G-2000/G-M - Rocket “G-2000” is a 122mm caliber with an approximate range of over 40 km
- R267 mm - Rocket motor “RM-267” is primarily designed as a technological demonstrator for the production of large diameter artillery rockets, with better performance.

=== Anti-Hail Rockets ===
- AHR_A6 & AHR_A8 - Rockets used to destruct hail storms and are re-usable.

=== R60 Air to Air Rocket Motor ===
- RM-R60 - Rocket motor EDePro RM-R60 and gas generator EDePro GG-R60 are developed and produced for overhaul purposes of widely spread Russian self-guided air to air missile systems R60M (MK).

=== Turbojet Engines ===
- TMM-040 “Mongoose” - TMM-040 is a small, single shaft, turbojet engine rated for 40 daN of static thrust.
- Auxiliary Power Unit TM40 - APU is based on turbo-shaft, single stage radial compressor, turbine, annular combustion chamber, engine TM40 with max. power of 40 kW.

=== Liquid Propellant Rocket Motor TRM-3500 ===
- TRM-3500 - The motor has been developed based on an existing Russian motor used on the rockets SAM-2 and SAM-3 (Dvina and Volkov).

== Developments ==
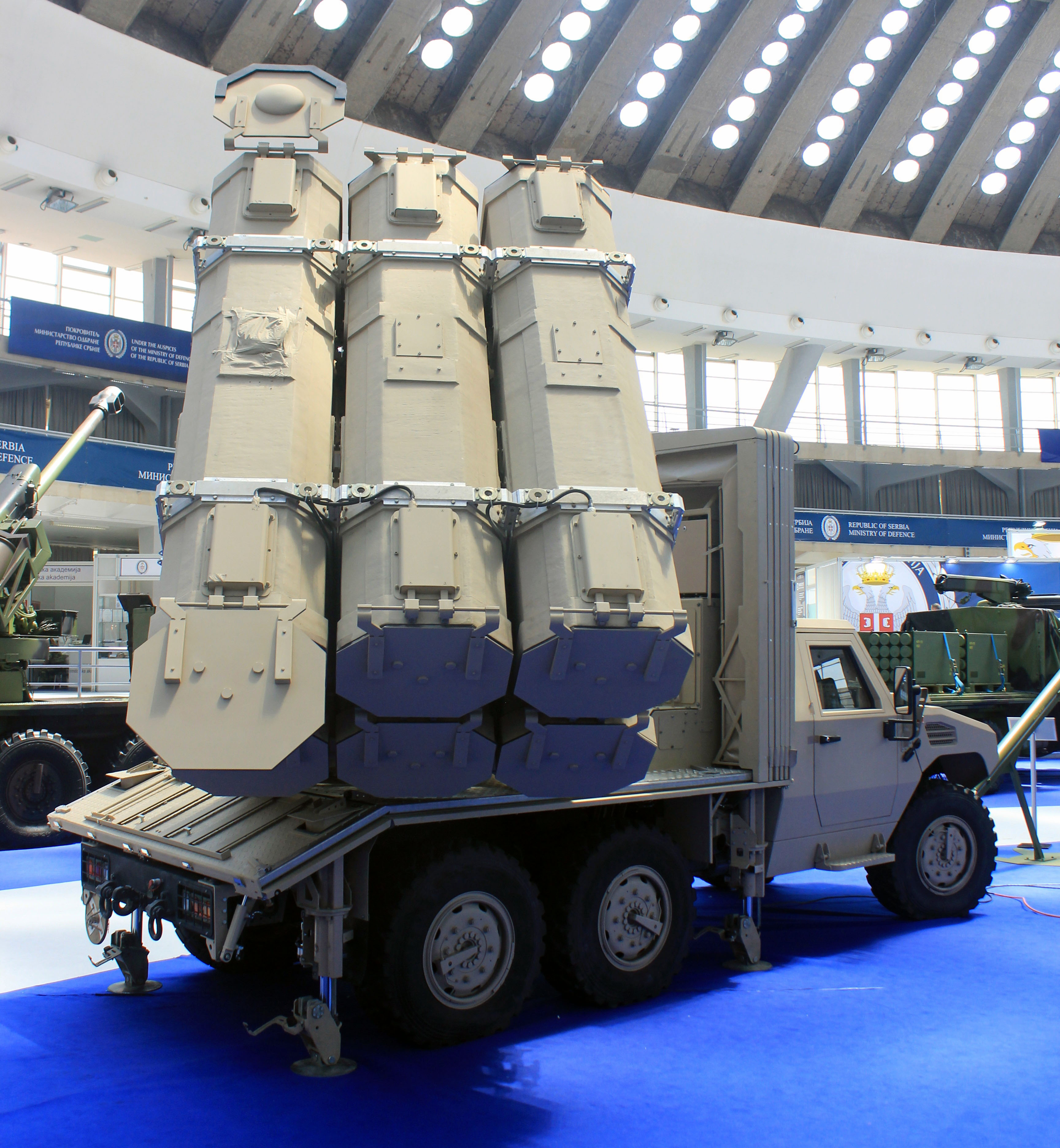
ALAS missile system

- ALAS - Advanced Light Attack System (ALAS) is a fire & forget, observe and update, multipurpose, TV guided weapon system.
- R400 mm - A 392 mm artillery rocket for tactical battlefield support.
- Rocket Assisted/Base Bleed Projectile - The (HE RA/BB 155mm) projectile is a rocket-assisted base bleed projectile that will extend the operational range of most 39, 45 and 52 caliber 155mm gun howitzers by over 10 km.
- SkyPickup – Light Transport Aircraft -SKYPICKUP is a revolutionary 5-seat Light Transport aircraft-
- Spider Anti-Tank Missile System
- Anti-Hail Rocket A6 and A8
- Newest Unmanned aerial vehicle and Unmanned combat aerial vehicle -- High Speed Target Drone and Rapier Unmanned Helicopter, Tip-Jet Helicopter

== Accidents ==
On 23 November 2021, an explosion in the storage area of an EDePro engine plant killed two people and wounded sixteen others.

== See also ==
- Defense industry of Serbia
