= High Speed Target Drone =

General information
- Type: Unmanned aerial vehicle
- National origin: Serbia
- Manufacturer: EdePro
- Designer: EdePro
- Status: Developing
- Number built: 1+

History
- Developed from: 2015

Target drone is intended as a system with ground to air defense role and as well as training role. The drone has a modern Ground Control Station which enables mission planning and re-tasking, mission rehearsal and playback and training of operators for system usage. A wide and flexible selection of mission payloads installed inside the fuselage, effectively complies with the requirements of most complex missile systems engagement scenarios for training and weapon systems test and evaluation purposes. WF-B1A high speed target drone is used for air defense/air force operation training and missile system development and evaluation. It features high maneuver, low RCS, low IR emission and super low altitude capabilities,

== Performance ==
- Altitude range from 200 [m] up to 5,000 [m]
- Speed range from 554 km/h up 1054 km/h
- Maximum normal overload 5[g]
- Maximum speed 1067 km/h at 5 000 m
- Controllable range 300 km (150 km radius)
- Altitude 200 m to 5000 m

== Partner 2015 ==
First time show by EdePro.

== See also ==
- Pegaz 011
- Rapier Unmanned Helicopter
- IAI Scout
- AAI RQ-7 Shadow
