= Yugoimport–SDPR =

Serbian defense company

Coordinates: 44°19′18″N 20°24′57″E

- Native name: Југоимпорт–СДПР; Jugoimport–SDPR
- Type: State-owned
- Industry: Defense
- Founded: 1949 (current form since 1997)
- Headquarters: Bulevar umetnosti 2, Belgrade, Serbia
- Key people: Jugoslav Petković (General director)
- Products: armoured vehicles artillery systems light trainer aircraft unmanned aerial vehicle small-caliber ammunition
- Services: arms export and import engineering
- Revenue: ▲€346.71 million (2025)
- Net income: ▼€3.51 million (2025)
- Total assets: ▼€1.40 billion (2025)
- Total equity: ▲€290.40 million (2025)
- Owner: Government of Serbia (100%)
- Number of employees: ▼351 (2025)
- Subsidiaries: Borbeni složeni sistemi Utva Aviation Industry; Belom; Jugoimport livnice Kovački centar Potisje precizni liv PMC Inženjering; Atera plus Kipal
- Website: yugoimport.com
- Footnotes; Business ID: 07051751; Tax ID: 100001790

Yugoimport–SDPR (Serbian: Југоимпорт–СДПР, romanized: Jugoimport–SDPR) is a Serbian and formerly Yugoslav state-owned weapons manufacturer as well as intermediary for the import and export of defense-related equipment. It is headquartered in Belgrade, with production facilities in Velika Plana, Kuršumlija, Pančevo, and Uzići.

== History ==
The company was founded in 1949 by the decree of the Prime Minister of Yugoslavia Josip Broz Tito, with the primary goal of importing parts and raw materials for the needs of the domestic defense industry. Over time, domestic production outgrew the needs of the domestic market, so Yugoimport started orienting towards foreign markets. Yugoimport started exporting weapons in 1953.

By a state resolution in 1974, affairs related to the import and export of weapons were centralized within the framework of the newly formed Federal Directorate for Procurement (Savezni direktorat za nabavke), where Jugoimport was also involved.

After several reorganizations, Yugoimport-SDPR became a fully owned state-company. During its history, the company has sales of approximately 22 billion dollars through the trade of weapons, equipment and technology.

== Manufacturing of weapons ==
The company works in cooperation with the Military Technical Institute in developing a wide array of weapons, from artillery systems and armoured vehicles to trainer aircraft and unmanned aerial vehicles. Recent flagship products include Nora B-52 155 mm self-propelled howitzer, Lazar 3 armoured personnel carrier, Miloš light armoured vehicle, ALAS guided missile, Lasta 95 light trainer aircraft, Pegaz combat drone, and the Premax 39 river patrol boat.

Manufacturing is organized through the following subsidiaries:

- Borbeni složeni sistemi ("Complex Fighting Systems") manufactures artillery systems and armoured vehicles at its facilities in Velika Plana and Kuršumlija.
- Utva Aviation Industry manufactures military trainer aircraft and drones at its facility in Pančevo.
- Belom manufactures small-caliber ammunition at its facility in Uzići near Požega.
- Jugoimport livnice, Potisje precizni liv, Kovački centar produce metal components for artillery systems and armoured vehicles.

=== Products ===
==== Artillery systems ====
- Nora B-52 155 mm self-propelled howitzer
- Sora 122 mm self-propelled howitzer

==== Armoured vehicles ====
- Lazar 3 armoured personnel carrier/infantry fighting vehicle
- BOV M16 Miloš multi-role armoured vehicle
- BOV M11 armoured reconnaissance vehicle

==== Aircraft ====
- Lasta 95 light trainer aircraft
- Sova light trainer aircraft

==== UAV ====
- Pegaz combat drone
- Vrabac reconnaissance drone
- Gavran 145 loitering munition
- Osica loitering munition

==== Missiles ====
- ALAS 175 mm multipurpose guided missile (in cooperation with EDePro)

==== Watercraft ====
- Premax 39 multirole fast patrol river boat

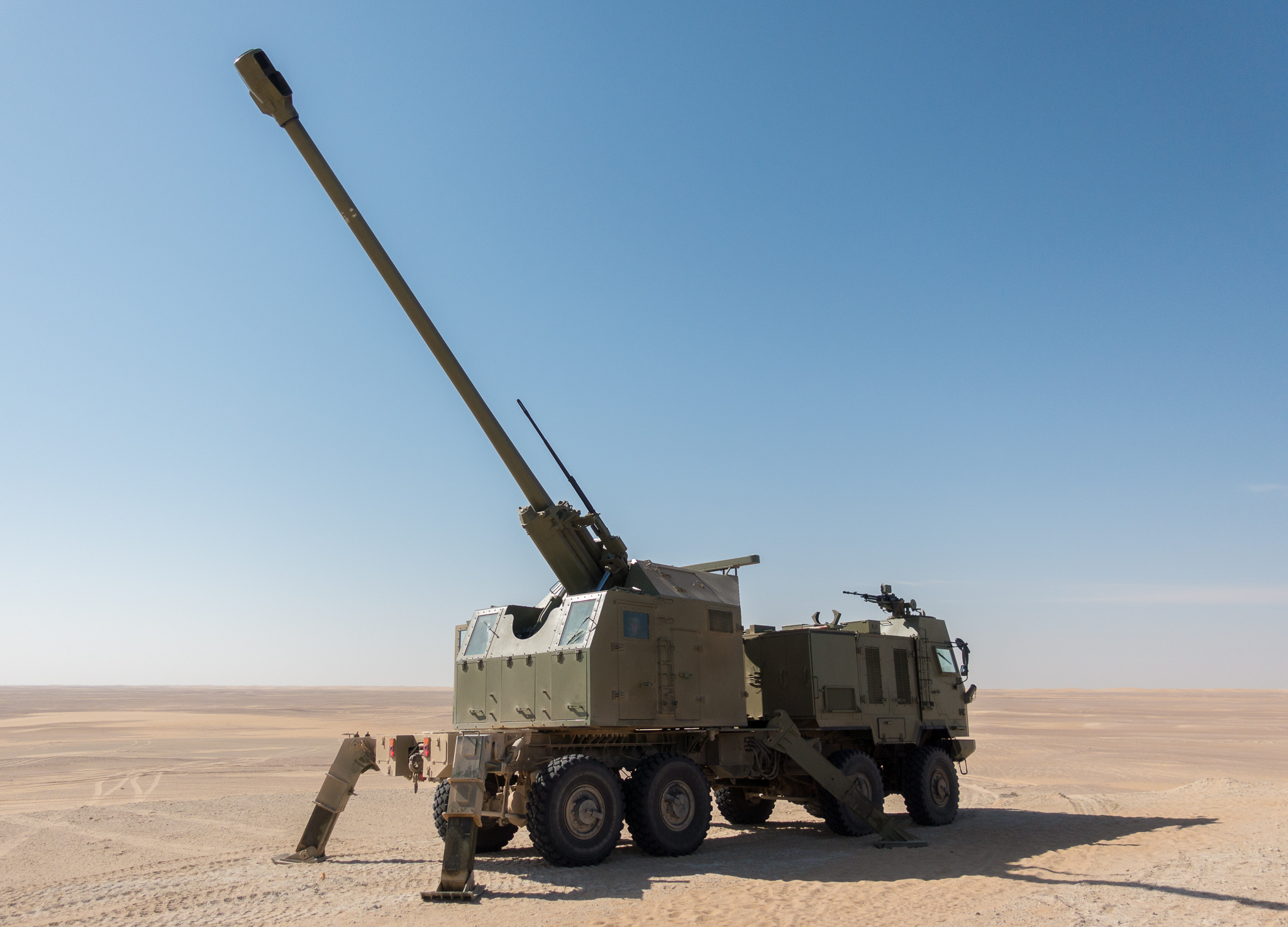
Nora B-52 155mm self-propelled howitzer

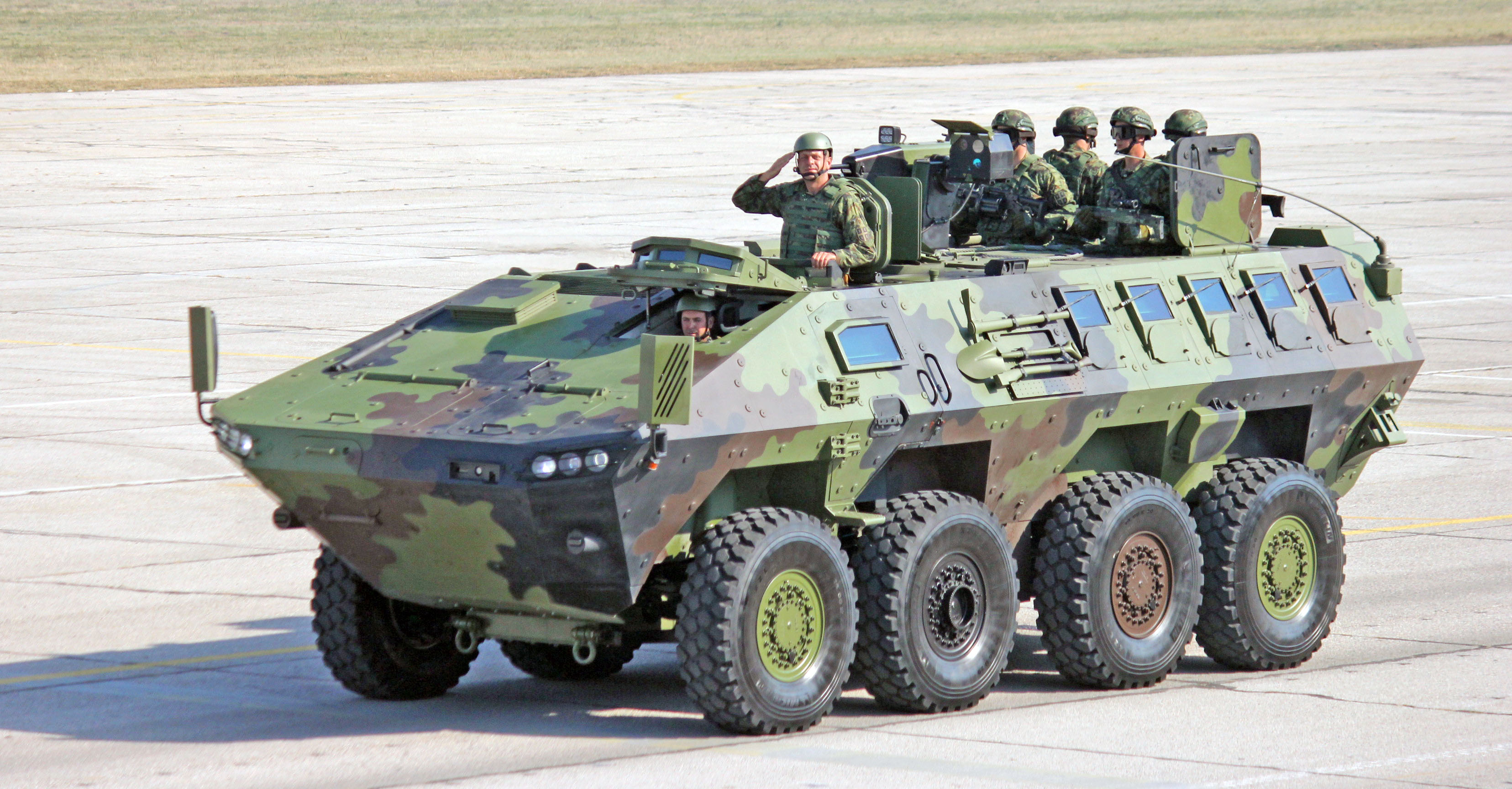
Lazar armoured personnel carrier

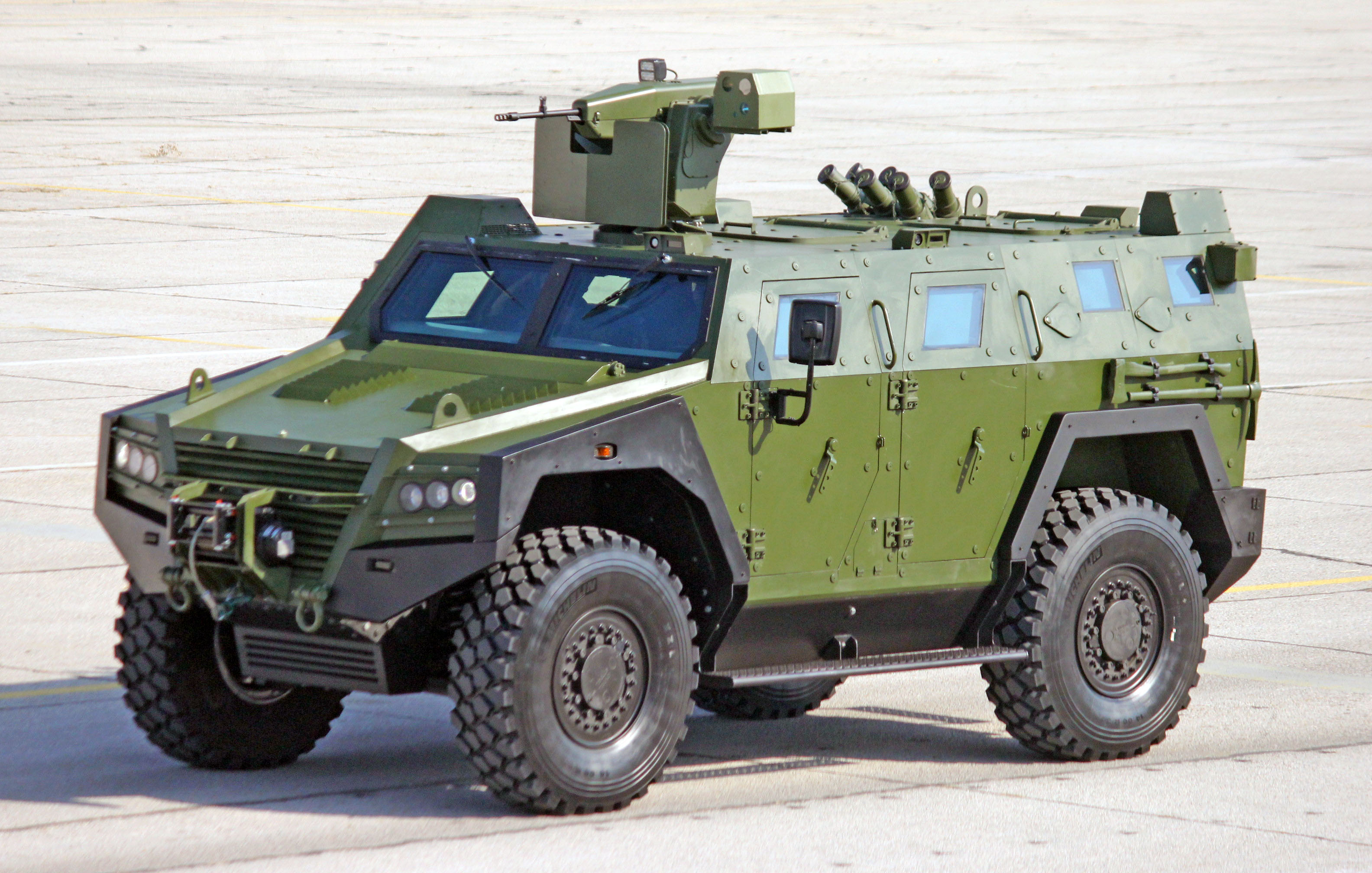
Miloš armoured vehicle

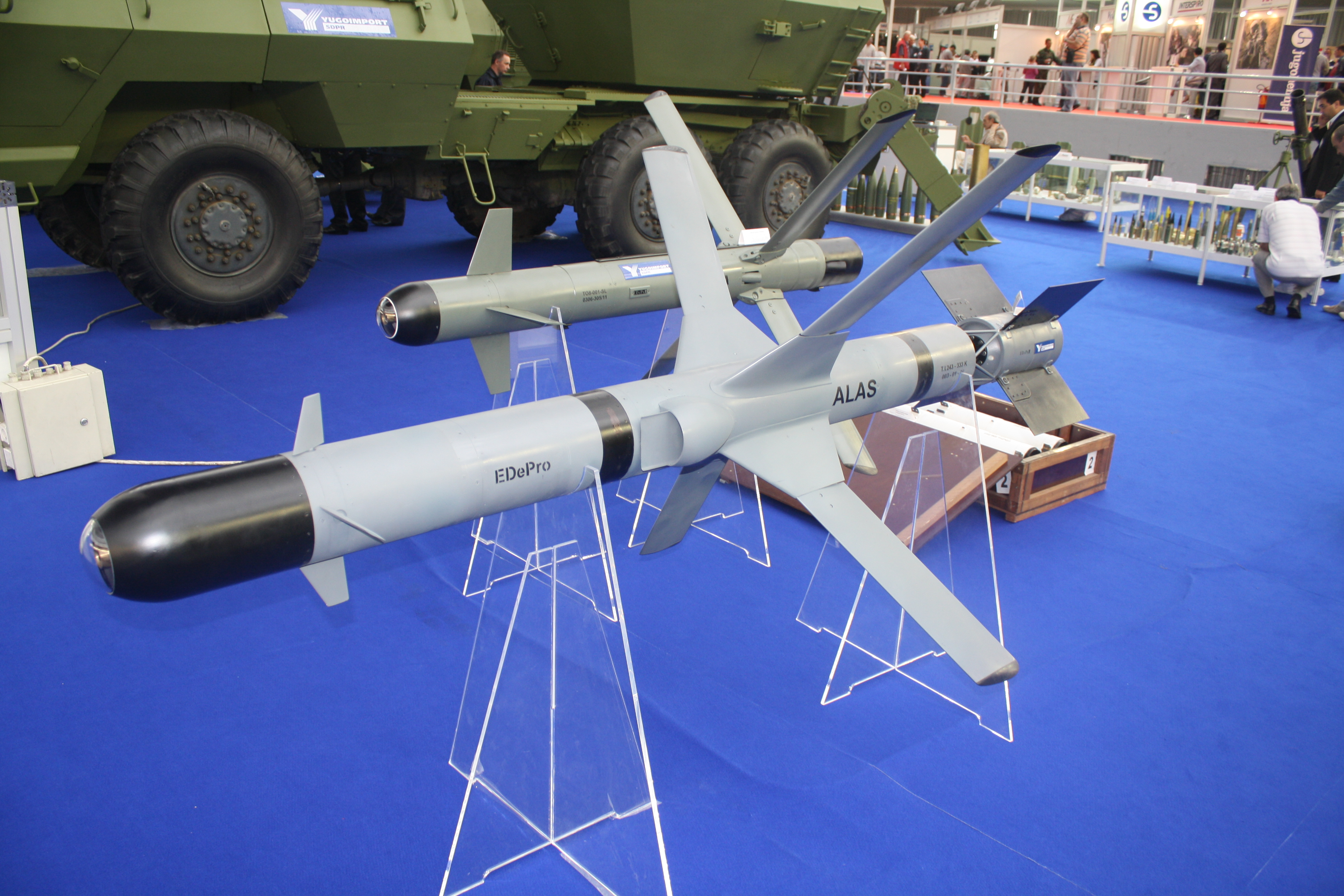
ALAS guided missile

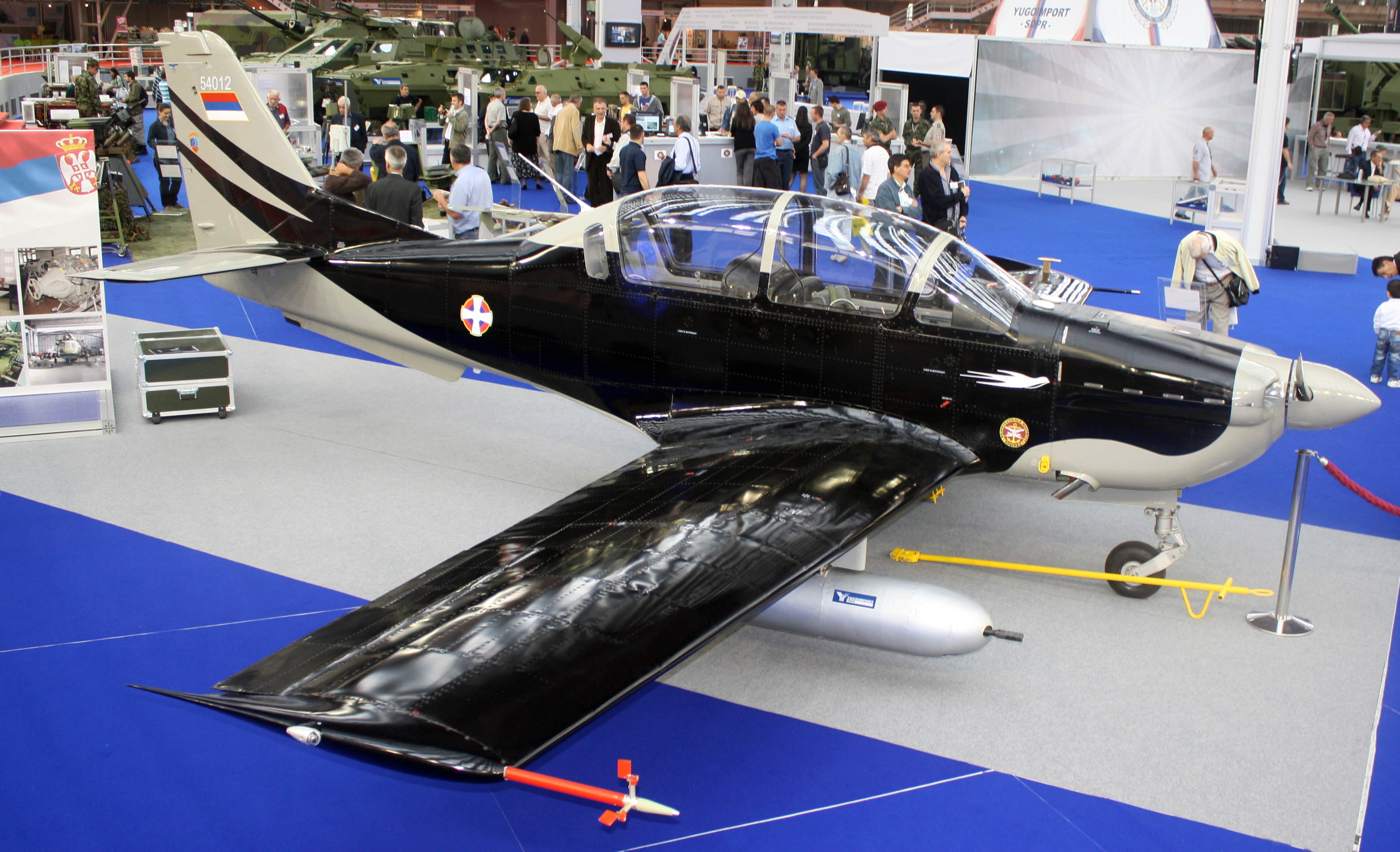
Lasta 95 light trainer aircraft

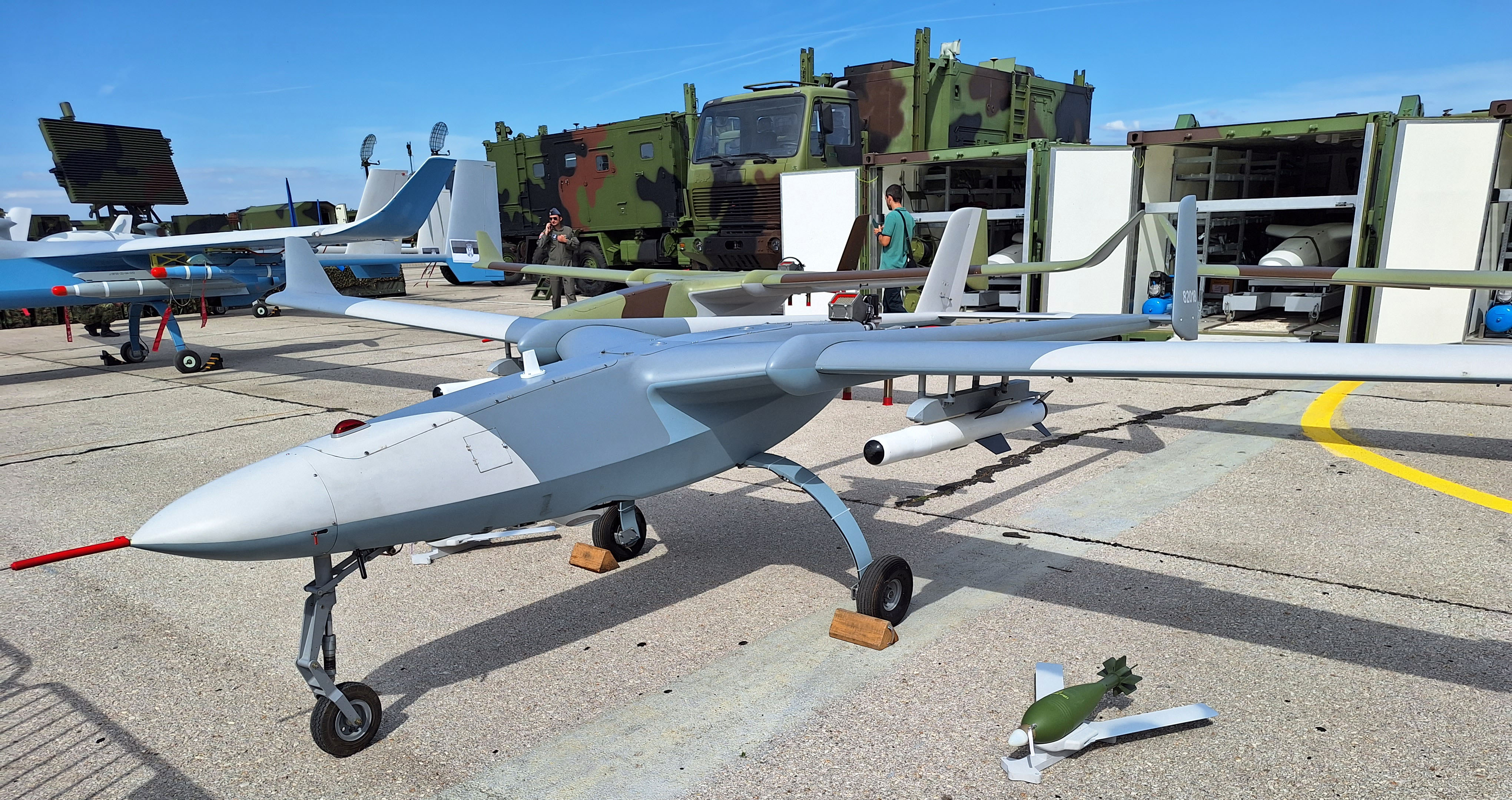
Pegaz combat drone

== Import and export of weapons ==
The company is the sole intermediary company that represents the Serbian government and Serbian military–industrial complex in the sphere of importation and exportation of defense equipment as well as technology transfers (through selling production licenses to foreign customers, such as those for MLRS M-87 Oganj to Iraq, for grenade launchers to Azerbaijan, small-caliber ammunition to India and Algeria).

== Engineering ==
Yugoimport built many military and civilian objects in numerous countries around the world including airports, hospitals, command posts, including many civilian and military facilities for Iraq under Saddam Hussein's regime.

In 2024, Yugoimport was contracted to renovate Baghdad's Commanding Officers' Club, which it had originally built under the Hussein regime.

Engineering is organized through PMC Inženjering and Atera plus subsisidiaries.

== See also ==
- Defense industry of Serbia
