= Uzići =

Uzići Узићи
- Village
- Location within Serbia
- Coordinates: 43°48′44″N 19°58′40″E
- Country: Serbia
- District: Zlatibor District
- Municipality: Požega

Area
  - Total: 5.1 km^{2} (2.0 sq mi)

Population (2022)
  - Total: 433
  - Density: 85/km^{2} (220/sq mi)
- Time zone: UTC+1 (CET)
  - Summer (DST): UTC+2 (CEST)

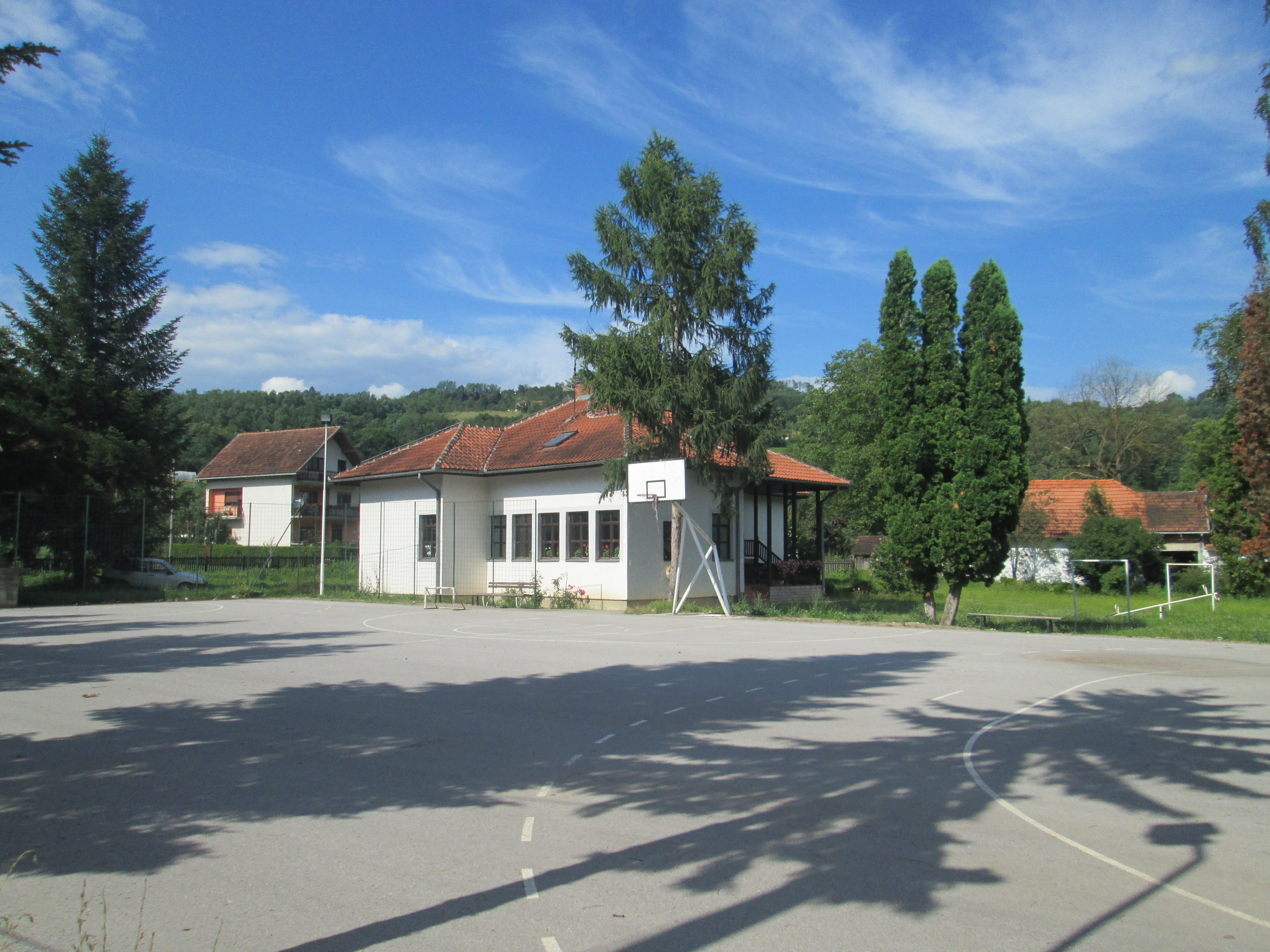
Primary school, Uzići

Uzići (Serbian Cyrillic: Узићи) is a village in the municipality of Požega, western Serbia. According to the 2022 census, the village has a population of 433 inhabitants.
