= List of equipment of the Serbian Armed Forces =

This is a list of equipment in operational use by the Serbian Armed Forces, not including equipment stored in reserve.

== Personal equipment ==
Name	Origin	Type	Quantity	Photo	Notes
Uniforms
Yumco M10	Serbia	Camouflage pattern			Standard camouflage pattern. Digital pixelated woodland.
Yumco M20	Serbia	Combat uniform			Standard combat uniform.
Yumco M20	Serbia	Combat kit			Standard combat kit.
Helmets
Yumco T18	Serbia	Low-cut combat helmet			Standard combat helmet.
Yumco T18	Serbia	High-cut combat helmet			Used by the special forces units (72nd Brigade for Special Operations and 63rd Parachute Brigade).
Bulletproof vests
Yumco T18	Serbia	Bulletproof vest			Standard bulletproof vest.
Gas masks
M3	Serbia	Gas mask			Standard gas mask. Domestically produced version of American EOD M45.

== Optoelectronics ==
Name	Origin	Type	Quantity	Photo	Notes
Binoculars
MOSKITO	Switzerland	Short-range binoculars			Used by the reconnaissance units of the four Army brigades.
Spoter 60	Serbia	Long-range binoculars			Used by the reconnaissance units of the four Army brigades.
JIM UC	France	Thermal imaging binoculars			Used by the special forces units (72nd Brigade for Special Operations and 63rd Parachute Brigade).
Night-vision devices
DVS-8	Russia	Night-vision goggles			Used by the special forces units (72nd Brigade for Special Operations and 63rd Parachute Brigade).
Multi-purpose devices
MIP-1	Serbia	Optoelectronic device			Used by the reconnaissance units of the four Army brigades.
MIP-11	Serbia	Optoelectronic device			Used by the reconnaissance units of the four Army brigades. Mounted on Humvee and BOV KIV reconnaissance vehicles on a telescopic pole that can be extended to a height of up to 4 meters.

== Firearms ==
Name	Origin	Type	Quantity	Photo	Notes
Handguns
Zastava CZ99	Yugoslavia	Pistol			Standard service pistol.
Heckler & Koch USP	Germany	Pistol			Used by the special forces units (72nd Brigade for Special Operations and 63rd Parachute Brigade).
Glock-17	Austria	Pistol			Used by the special forces units (72nd Brigade for Special Operations and 63rd Parachute Brigade).
Carbines
HK416	Germany	Carbine			Used by the 72nd Brigade for Special Operations.
Zastava M59/66	Yugoslavia	Carbine			Used by the Honour Guard Battalion of the Guard.
Rifles
Zastava M19	Serbia	Assault rifle			Standard service rifle. Modular rifle with dual-caliber (6.5/7.62 mm) capability.
Zastava M21	Serbia	Assault rifle			Reserve service rifle. Still in use as standard service rifle.
FN SCAR	Belgium	Battle rifle			Used by the special forces units (72nd Brigade for Special Operations and 63rd Parachute Brigade).
Sniper rifles
Zastava M91	Serbia	Designated marksman rifle			Standard marksman rifle.
Zastava M07	Serbia	Sniper rifle			Future standard sniper rifle.
Sako TRG	Finland	Sniper rifle			Used by the special forces units (72nd Brigade for Special Operations and 63rd Parachute Brigade).
Zastava M93	Serbia	Anti-materiel rifle			Standard anti-materiel rifle.
Zastava M12M	Serbia	Anti-materiel rifle			Future standard anti-materiel rifle.
Barrett M95	United States	Anti-materiel rifle			Used by the special forces units (72nd Brigade for Special Operations and 63rd Parachute Brigade).
Machine guns
Zastava M84	Yugoslavia	General-purpose machine gun			Standard general-purpose machine gun. Domestically produced version of PKM machine gun.
Zastava M77	Yugoslavia	Light machine gun			Standard light machine gun.
FN Minimi	Belgium	Light machine gun			Used by the special forces units (72nd Brigade for Special Operations and 63rd Parachute Brigade).
Zastava M87	Yugoslavia	Heavy machine gun			Standard heavy machine gun.
Zastava M02 Coyote	Serbia	Heavy machine gun			Mounted on Humvee vehicles.
M2 Browning	United States	Heavy machine gun			Mounted on Humvee vehicles.
Submachine guns
M84 Škorpion	Czechoslovakia; Yugoslavia	Submachine gun			Used by tank and infantry fighting vehicle crews. Domestically produced version of Czech Škorpion.
Heckler & Koch UMP9	Germany	Submachine gun			Used by the special forces units (72nd Brigade for Special Operations and 63rd Parachute Brigade).
Heckler & Koch MP5	Germany	Submachine gun			Used by the special forces units (72nd Brigade for Special Operations and 63rd Parachute Brigade).
Underwater firearms
SPP-1	Soviet Union	Underwater pistol			Used by the 82nd River Underwater Demolition Company of the 72nd Brigade for Special Operations.
APS	Soviet Union	Underwater rifle			Used by the 82nd River Underwater Demolition Company of the 72nd Brigade for Special Operations.
Grenade launchers
M93 AGL	Serbia	Automatic grenade launcher			Standard grenade launcher. Domestically produced version of AGS-17.
M11 PD-51	Serbia	Grenade launcher			Six-shot revolver-type grenade launcher.
Grenades and mines
LRB M3/93	Serbia	Smoke grenade			Used by infantry battalions of the four Army brigades and the special forces units (72nd Brigade for Special Operations and 63rd Parachute Brigade).
RŠB P98	Serbia	Smoke grenade			Used by infantry battalions of the four Army brigades and the special forces units (72nd Brigade for Special Operations and 63rd Parachute Brigade).
BRK M79	Yugoslavia	Anti-tank grenade			Used by infantry battalions of the four Army brigades.
PROM-1	Yugoslavia	Anti-personnel mine			Used by infantry battalions of the four Army brigades.
PMA-2	Yugoslavia	Anti-personnel mine			Used by infantry battalions of the four Army brigades.
TMA-3	Yugoslavia	Anti-tank mine			Used by infantry battalions of the four Army brigades.
TMA-4	Yugoslavia	Anti-tank mine			Used by infantry battalions of the four Army brigades.
TMA-5	Yugoslavia	Anti-tank mine			Used by infantry battalions of the four Army brigades.
TMRP-6	Yugoslavia	Anti-tank mine			Used by infantry battalions of the four Army brigades.

== Armoured vehicles ==
Name	Origin	Type	Quantity	Photo	Notes
Main battle tanks
M-84 M-84AS2	Yugoslavia Serbia	Main battle tank	186 26+		Basic version, M-84, deployed in tank battalions of the four Army brigades, is undergoing serial modernization to the M-84AS2/3 variants. The modernized variant features a turret and hull covered with domestic second-generation explosive reactive armor, an improved fire-control system with an integrated day/night sight, a commander scope with six low-light cameras for enhanced situational awareness, sensors for detecting radar, laser designation, and rocket launches coupled with automatic smoke grenade deployment for protection, and improved mobility with an upgraded engine.
T-72B1MS	Russia	Main battle tank	30		Deployed in the Tank Battalion of the Army Command. Modernized version of T-72B, equipped with optoelectronic systems.
Infantry fighting vehicles
Lazar 3M	Serbia	Wheeled infantry fighting vehicle	40+		Deployed in infantry battalions of the four Army brigades. Infantry fighting vehicle variant of Lazar 3, armed with RCWS with 30 mm cannon. Additional procurement is ongoing.
BVP M-80A BVP M-80AB1	Yugoslavia Serbia	Tracked infantry fighting vehicle	280 40+		Basic version, BVP M-80A, deployed in mechanized battalions of the four Army brigades, is undergoing serial modernization to the M-80AB1 variant. The modernized variant features a more advanced armor, turret gun control equipment, optoelectronic systems, smoke grenade launchers; the ability to mount and launch anti-tank missile; improved mobility with upgraded engine.
Armoured personnel carriers
Lazar 3	Serbia	8x8 armoured personnel carrier	80+		Deployed in infantry battalions of the four Army brigades. Additional procurement is ongoing.
BTR-80AMS	Russia; Serbia	8x8 amphibious armoured personnel carrier	108		Basic version, BTR-80A, deployed in infantry battalions of the four Army brigades, has undergone serial modernization to the BTR-80AMS variant. The modernized variant features more advanced armor, optoelectronic systems, and gyroscopic stabilization of the 30mm cannon.
BOV OT	Serbia	4x4 armoured personnel carrier	20+		Deployed in infantry battalions of the four Army brigades. Additional procurement is ongoing.
Armoured vehicles
M20 MRAP	Serbia	6x6 MRAP	30+		Deployed in infantry battalions of the four Army brigades. Additional procurement is ongoing.
BOV M16 Miloš	Serbia	4x4 MRAP	109+		Deployed in infantry battalions of the four Army brigades and the special forces units (72nd Brigade for Special Operations and 63rd Parachute Brigade). Additional procurement is ongoing.
BRDM-2 BRDM-2MS	Soviet Union Russia	Reconnaissance vehicle	46 30		Basic variant deployed in tank and mechanized battalions of the four Army brigades. Modernized variant BRDM-2MS deployed in the Armored Reconnaissance Battalion of the Army Command.
BOV KIV	Serbia	Command vehicle	20+		Deployed in the Mixed Artillery Brigade. Additional procurement is planned.
MT-LBu	Soviet Union	Command armoured vehicle	32		Deployed in self-propelled artillery battalions of the four Army brigades. Modernization conducted between 2020 and 2025.
BOV-1 POLO M83 BOV-1 POLO M83M	Yugoslavia Serbia	Tank destroyer	38 10		Basic version, BOV-1 POLO M83, deployed in mechanized battalions of the four Army brigades, is undergoing serial modernization to the BOV-1 POLO M83M variant. The modernized variant features, besides platform equipped with four launchers of upgraded 9M14 Malyutka anti-tank guided missiles (featured in basic version), additional launch platform equipped with four launchers of Osica loitering munition (20 km range).
BOV-VP	Yugoslavia	Armoured vehicle	52		Deployed in the Military Police.
Humvee	United States	Armoured vehicle	158		Deployed in infantry battalions of the four Army brigades and the special forces units (72nd Brigade for Special Operations and 63rd Parachute Brigade).
BearCat G3	United States	Armoured vehicle	5		Deployed in the 25th Military Police Battalion of the Guard.
Armoured recovery vehicles
M-84AI	Yugoslavia	Armoured recovery vehicle	5		Deployed in mechanized battalions of the four Army brigades. Domestically produced version of Polish WZT-3.
JVBT	Czechoslovakia	Armoured recovery vehicle	12		Deployed in mechanized battalions and self-propelled artillery battalions of the four Army brigades.
WZT-2	Poland	Armoured recovery vehicle	16		Deployed in mechanized battalions of the four Army brigades.
Armoured vehicle-launched bridges
MT-55	Soviet Union	Armoured vehicle-launched bridge	24		Deployed in tank and mechanized battalions of the four Army brigades.
Unmanned ground vehicles
Mali Miloš	Serbia	Unmanned ground vehicle	26+		Deployed in the 72nd Brigade for Special Operations.
Robodog	China Serbia	Armed military robot			Deployed in the 72nd Brigade for Special Operations and Cobras MP.

== Unarmoured vehicles ==
Name	Origin	Type	Quantity	Photo	Notes
Trucks
FAP 1118	Serbia	4×4 off-road truck	124+		Deployed in logistics battalions of the four Army brigades.
TAM 110 T7 B/BV	Yugoslavia	4×4 off-road truck	360		Deployed in logistics battalions of the four Army brigades.
FAP 13	Yugoslavia	4×4 off-road truck			Deployed in logistics battalions of the four Army brigades.
FAP 3040	Serbia	6×6 off-road truck			Deployed in logistics battalions of the four Army brigades.
FAP 2228	Serbia	6×6 off-road truck	20+		Deployed in logistics battalions of the four Army brigades.
TAM 150 T11 B/BV	Yugoslavia	6×6 off-road truck	210		Deployed in logistics battalions of the four Army brigades.
TAM 260 T22	Yugoslavia	6×6 off-road truck			Deployed in logistics battalions of the four Army brigades.
FAP 2026	Yugoslavia	6×6 off-road truck	200		Deployed in logistics battalions of the four Army brigades.
KrAZ-255	Soviet Union	6×6 off-road truck			Deployed in logistics battalions of the four Army brigades.
Ural-375D	Soviet Union	6×6 off-road truck			Deployed in logistics battalions of the four Army brigades.
ZIL-131	Soviet Union	6×6 off-road truck			Deployed in logistics battalions of the four Army brigades.
FAP 3240	Serbia	8×8 off-road truck	4+		Deployed in logistics battalions of the four Army brigades.
FAP 3232	Yugoslavia	8x8 off-road truck	8		Deployed in logistics battalions of the four Army brigades.
Shaanxi HMV3	China	8×8 off-road truck			Deployed in logistics battalions of the four Army brigades.
FAP 2026 BST AV	Yugoslavia	Semi-trailer	7		Deployed in logistics battalions of the four Army brigades.
MAN TGS 33.480	Germany	Semi-trailer	6		Deployed in logistics battalions of the four Army brigades.
MAZ-537	Soviet Union	Semi-trailer	10		Deployed in logistics battalions of the four Army brigades.
FAP 2632	Yugoslavia	Semi-trailer			Deployed in logistics battalions of the four Army brigades.
FAP 1921	Yugoslavia	Semi-trailer			Deployed in logistics battalions of the four Army brigades.
HOWO 336	China	Semi-trailer			Deployed in logistics battalions of the four Army brigades.
Iveco S-way	Italy	Semi-trailer	5		Deployed in logistics battalions of the four Army brigades.
TAM 130 T10	Yugoslavia	Dump truck			Deployed in logistics battalions of the four Army brigades.
HOWO TAZ 3190C 4х4	China	Dump truck			Deployed in logistics battalions of the four Army brigades.
Iveco Trakker	Italy	Dump truck			Deployed in logistics battalions of the four Army brigades.
Scania 113M 310	Sweden	Tank truck	8		Deployed in air technical battalions of the two Air brigades.
MAN TGS 18.430	Germany	Tank truck			Deployed in air technical battalions of the two Air brigades.
MAN 17.192	Germany	Tank truck	3		Deployed in air technical battalions of the two Air brigades.
MAN TGM 18.250	Germany	Tank truck			Deployed in air technical battalions of the two Air brigades.
Engineering vehicles
Liu Gong 926E	China	Excavator			Deployed in engineer battalions of the four Army brigades.
IMK ULT-150; IMK ULT-160B; IMK ULT-160C	Yugoslavia	Wheel loader			Deployed in engineer battalions of the four Army brigades.
ЈСB 436	United Kingdom	Wheel loader			Deployed in engineer battalions of the four Army brigades.
ZL 3500; ZL 5001F	Germany	Wheel loader and dozer			Deployed in engineer battalions of the four Army brigades.
JCB 4CX	United Kingdom	Backhoe loader			Deployed in engineer battalions of the four Army brigades.
VOLVO BM	Sweden	Backhoe loader			Deployed in engineer battalions of the four Army brigades.
KN-251	Yugoslavia	Backhoe loader			Deployed in engineer battalions of the four Army brigades.
IMK TG-140; IMK TG-160; IMK TG-170; IMK TG-200	Yugoslavia	Tracked dozer			Deployed in engineer battalions of the four Army brigades.
LiuGong 230C	China	Tracked dozer			Deployed in engineer battalions of the four Army brigades.
Dressta TD15M	Poland	Tracked dozer			Deployed in engineer battalions of the four Army brigades.
Caterpillar D8	United States	Tracked dozer			Deployed in engineer battalions of the four Army brigades.
Liu Gong GJT 112А	China	Wheel dozer			Deployed in engineer battalions of the four Army brigades.
LiuGong 4140	China	Grader			Deployed in engineer battalions of the four Army brigades.
Liu Gong 6616B	China	Road roller			Deployed in engineer battalions of the four Army brigades.
Bomag BW-200	Germany	Road roller			Deployed in engineer battalions of the four Army brigades.
САТ CS78B	United States	Road roller			Deployed in engineer battalions of the four Army brigades.
BMB	Yugoslavia	Driller of mine wells			Deployed in engineer battalions of the four Army brigades.
PM M71	Yugoslavia	Pontoon bridge			Deployed in the River Flotilla.
PTS-M	Soviet Union	Amphibious vehicle	12		Deployed in the River Flotilla.
Off-road utility vehicles
Zastava NTV	Serbia	Off-road vehicle	40+		Deployed in several versions in the Army, special forces units (72nd Brigade for Special Operations and 63rd Parachute Brigade) and in the 224th Center for Electronic Action. Additional procurement is ongoing.
Pinzgauer 710	Austria	Off-road vehicle			Deployed in infantry battalions of the four Army brigades.
Puch 300GD	Germany	Off-road vehicle			Deployed in infantry battalions of the four Army brigades.
UAZ-469	Soviet Union	Off-road vehicle			Deployed in infantry battalions of the four Army brigades.
Land Rover Defender	United Kingdom	Off-road vehicle	70		Deployed in the special forces units (72nd Brigade for Special Operations and 63rd Parachute Brigade).
UAZ Patriot	Russia	Off-road vehicle	64		Deployed in battalions of the Military Police.
Toyota Hilux	Japan	Off-road vehicle	100		Deployed in battalions of the Military Police.
Isuzu	Japan	Off-road vehicle			Deployed in battalions of the Military Police.
Mercedes-Benz G-Class	Germany	Off-road vehicle			Deployed in the Detachment of the Military Police for Special Operations "Cobras".
Utility vehicles
Nanjing-Iveco Turbo Daily	China	Ambulance	20		Deployed in logistical battalions of the four Army brigades.
Unimog U1300L	Germany	Ambulance	3		Deployed in logistical battalions of the four Army brigades.
Dingo 2	Germany	Ambulance	2		Deployed in logistical battalions of the four Army brigades.
BOV SN	Yugoslavia	Ambulance			Deployed in logistical battalions of the four Army brigades.
Citroen Jumper	France	Ambulance			Deployed in logistical battalions of the four Army brigades.
Fiat Ducato	Italy	Ambulance			Deployed in logistical battalions of the four Army brigades.
Fiat Ducato	Italy	Van			Deployed in battalions of the Military Police.
Škoda Superb	Czech Republic	Patrol car			Deployed in battalions of the Military Police.
Škoda Fabia	Czech Republic	Patrol car			Deployed in battalions of the Military Police.
Škoda Scala	Czech Republic	Patrol car			Deployed in battalions of the Military Police.
BMW R1200RT	Germany	Motorcycle	12		Deployed in the 25th Military Police Battalion of the Guard.
Polaris Sportsman S XP1000	United States	ATV	16		Deployed in the special forces units (72nd Brigade for Special Operations and 63rd Parachute Brigade).

== Artillery ==
Name	Origin	Type	Quantity	Photo	Notes
Self-propelled artillery
Nora B-52	Serbia	155 mm self-propelled howitzer	24+		Deployed in the Mixed Artillery Brigade. Additional procurement is ongoing.
2S1 Gvozdika 2S1M Gvozdika	Soviet Union Serbia	122 mm self-propelled howitzer	18 54		Basic version, 2S1, deployed in self-propelled artillery battalions of the four Army brigades, is undergoing serial modernization to the 2S1M variant. The modernized variant features a new fire control system with range of 22 km as well as inertial navigation system and GPRS.
Towed artillery
Nora M-84	Yugoslavia	152 mm gun-howitzer	36		Deployed in the Mixed Artillery Brigade.
M-46	Soviet Union	130 mm howitzer	36		Deployed in the Mixed Artillery Brigade. Caliber conversion to 155mm conducted on a certain number of pieces.
D-30J	Soviet Union	122 mm howitzer	80		Deployed in the Mixed Artillery Brigade.
ZiS-3	Soviet Union	Field gun	18		Deployed in the Honour Guard Battalion of the Guard.
Rocket artillery
PULS	Israel	370mm/306mm/160mm/122mm multiple rocket launcher	20		Deployed in the Mixed Artillery Brigade. Armed with Predator Hawk tactical ballistic missiles (370 mm caliber and 300 km range) as well as EXTRA and ACCULAR artillery rockets (306 mm and 160 mm caliber, respectively; 150 km and 40 km range, respectively).
M-87 Orkan	Yugoslavia	262 mm multiple rocket launcher	4		Deployed in the Mixed Artillery Brigade.
RM-70 Vampire	Czech Republic	122mm multiple rocket launcher	30		Deployed in the Mixed Artillery Brigade. Modernized variant of RM-70, features armored cabin and digital fire control.
M-18 Oganj	Serbia	175 mm/128 mm/122mm multiple rocket launcher	8+		Deployed in multiple rocket launcher artillery battalions of the four Army brigades. Armed with ALAS guided missile (175 mm caliber and 25 km range) and Oganj missile (128 mm caliber and 40 km range) and equipped with digital electronics (computerized guidance system, new digital radio and inertial navigation).
M-77 Oganj M-17D Oganj	Yugoslavia Serbia	128 mm multiple rocket launcher	30 30		Basic version, M77, deployed in multiple rocket launcher artillery battalions of the four Army brigades, is undergoing serial modernization to the M-17D variant. The modernized variant features the new fire control system, inertial navigation system, and GPRS.
M-94 Plamen S	Serbia	128 mm multiple rocket launcher	18		Deployed in multiple rocket launcher artillery battalions of the four Army brigades. Modernized variant of M-63 Plamen.
Mortars
M95	Serbia	120 mm mortar	24		Used by infantry battalions of the four Army brigades.
M74/M75	Yugoslavia	120 mm mortar	57		Used by infantry battalions of the four Army brigades.
M69	Yugoslavia	82 mm mortar	106		Used by infantry battalions of the four Army brigades.
M57	Yugoslavia	60 mm mortar			Used by infantry battalions of the four Army brigades.

== Anti-armour weapons ==
Name	Origin	Type	Quantity	Photo	Notes
Rocket launchers
M90 Stršljen	Serbia	Man-portable rocket launcher			Used by infantry battalions of the four Army brigades.
M80 Zolja	Yugoslavia	Man-portable rocket launcher	200		Used by infantry battalions of the four Army brigades.
M79 Osa	Yugoslavia	Man-portable rocket launcher			Used by infantry battalions of the four Army brigades.

== Aircraft ==
Name	Origin	Type	Quantity	Photo	Notes
Combat aircraft
Rafale	France	Multirole aircraft	0/12		To be introduced in the 204th Air Brigade in 2028. Twelve pieces (version F4) ordered.
MiG-29	Soviet Union; Russia	Multirole aircraft	11		Basic version, MiG-29S, deployed in the 101st Fighter Squadron of the 204th Air Brigade, has undergone serial modernization to the MiG-29SM variant.
J-22	Yugoslavia Serbia	Attack aircraft	13		Basic version, NJ-22, deployed in the 241st Fighter-Bomber Squadron of the 98th Air Brigade, is undergoing serial modernization to the J-22 M1A variant (four modernized pieces as of 2023).
Transport aircraft
C-295	Spain	Transport aircraft	2		Deployed in the 138th Transport Squadron of the 204th Air Brigade.
An-26	Soviet Union	Transport aircraft	1		Deployed in the 138th Transport Squadron of the 204th Air Brigade.
Reconnaissance aircraft
PA-34	United States	Photogrammetric surveying aircraft	1		Deployed in the 138th Transport Squadron of the 204th Air Brigade.
Trainer aircraft
MiG-29UB	Soviet Union	Conversion trainer	3		Deployed in the 252nd Training Squadron of the 204th Air Brigade.
G-4	Yugoslavia	Jet trainer	4		Deployed in the 252nd Training Squadron of the 204th Air Brigade.
Lasta 95	Serbia	Basic trainer	14		Deployed in the 252nd Training Squadron of the 204th Air Brigade.
Helicopters
Mi-35	Russia	Attack helicopter	15+		Deployed in the 714th Anti-armour Helicopter Squadron of the 98th Air Brigade. Four pieces in Mi-35M version (four more on order, delivery postponed due to sanctions on Russia) and eleven pieces in Mi-35P version.
Mi-17	Russia	Utility helicopter	5+		Deployed in the 890th Mixed Helicopter Squadron of the 204th Air Brigade. Three more on order, delivery postponed due to sanctions on Russia.
H145M	Germany	Utility helicopter	15		Deployed in the 119th Mixed Helicopter Squadron of the 98th Air Brigade. Ten pieces armed (seven with HForce 3 weapon system and three with HForce 1 weapon system), five non-armed.
SA341H	France	Observation helicopter	25		Deployed in the 714th Anti-armour Helicopter Squadron (armed version with 9K11 Malyutka anti-armour missiles) and in the 119th Mixed Helicopter Squadron (non-armed version) of the 98th Air Brigade.
Unmanned aerial vehicles
Hermes 900	Israel	Combat / Reconnaissance drone	3		Deployed in the 353rd Reconnaissance Squadron of the 98th Air Brigade.
CH-95	China	Combat drone	10		Deployed in the 353rd Reconnaissance Squadron of the 98th Air Brigade.
CH-92	China	Combat drone	6		Deployed in the 353rd Reconnaissance Squadron of the 98th Air Brigade.
Pegaz	Serbia	Combat drone	12+		Deployed in the 353rd Reconnaissance Squadron of the 98th Air Brigade.
Skylark 3	Israel	Reconnaissance drone			Deployed in infantry battalions of the four Army brigades.
Orbiter	Israel	Reconnaissance drone	10		Deployed in infantry battalions of the four Army brigades.
Vrabac	Serbia	Reconnaissance drone	50+		Deployed in infantry battalions of the four Army brigades.
SkyStriker	Israel	Loitering munition			Deployed in the Mixed Artillery Brigade.
Shadow 50	United Arab Emirates	Loitering munition	60		Deployed in the Mixed Artillery Brigade.
Shadow 25	United Arab Emirates	Loitering munition	60		Deployed in the Mixed Artillery Brigade.
SM2	United Arab Emirates	Loitering munition	130		Deployed in the Mixed Artillery Brigade.
Gavran 145	Serbia	Loitering munition			Deployed in the Mixed Artillery Brigade.
Osica	Serbia	Loitering munition			Deployed in the Mixed Artillery Brigade.
Lanius-X	Israel	Loitering munition			Deployed in the special forces units (72nd Brigade for Special Operations and 63rd Parachute Brigade).
Komarac	Serbia	Loitering munition	5,000+		Deployed in infantry battalions of the four Army brigades.
AR-100C	Germany	Multirotor	60		Deployed in infantry battalions of the four Army brigades.
DJI Matrice 350	China	Multirotor	38		Deployed in infantry battalions of the four Army brigades.
DJI Matrice 30	China	Multirotor	50		Deployed in infantry battalions of the four Army brigades.
DJI Mini 3 Pro	China	Multirotor	60		Deployed in infantry battalions of the four Army brigades.
DJI Mavic 3	China	Multirotor	90		Deployed in infantry battalions of the four Army brigades.
IKA-20	Serbia	Multirotor	50+		Deployed in infantry battalions of the four Army brigades.

== Air defence ==
Name	Origin	Type	Quantity	Photo	Notes
Surface-to-air missile systems
HQ-9	China	Long-range surface-to-air missile system	on order		To be introduced in the 250th Air Defence Missile Brigade. In use will be HQ-9BE version of the system (260 km range).
HQ-22	China	Medium-range surface-to-air missile system	4 batteries		Deployed in the 250th Air Defence Missile Brigade. In use is FK-3 version of the system (100 km range).
HQ-17	China	Short-range surface-to-air missile system	2 batteries		Deployed in the 250th Air Defence Missile Brigade. In use is HQ-17AE version of the system (20 km range).
Pantsir	Russia	Short-range surface-to-air missile system	1 battery		Deployed in the 250th Air Defense Missile Brigade. Two batteries of Pantsir-S1M on order, delivery postponed due to sanctions on Russia.
2K12 Kub	Soviet Union	Short-range surface-to-air missile system	3 batteries		Deployed in the 250th Air Defence Missile Brigade. Modernization (version Kub M2) conducted between 2016 and 2018.
S-125 Neva	Soviet Union	Short-range surface-to-air missile system	5 batteries		Deployed in the 250th Air Defence Missile Brigade. Modernization (version Neva M1T) conducted between 2013 and 2015.
PASARS-16	Serbia	Short-range surface-to-air missile system Anti-aircraft autocannon	5 batteries		Deployed in air-defence artillery battalions of the four Army brigades. Hybrid system armed with Bofors L/70 40 mm anti-aircraft gun as well as, depending on the version, with either French Mistral 3 or 9K32 Strela-2M/9K38 Igla missiles.
9K35 Strela-10	Soviet Union	Short-range surface-to-air missile system	1 battery		Deployed in air-defence artillery battalions of the four Army brigades. Modernization (version 9K35 Strela-10M) conducted between 2020 and 2025.
9K31 Strela-1	Soviet Union	Short-range surface-to-air missile system	4 batteries		Deployed in air-defence artillery battalions of the 2nd, 3rd and 4th Army brigades.
MANPADS
Mistral 3	France	Man-portable air-defense system	18		Used by infantry battalions of the four Army brigades.
9K38 Igla	Soviet Union	Man-portable air-defense system	54		Used by infantry battalions of the four Army brigades.
9K32 Strela-2	Soviet Union	Man-portable air-defense system			Used by infantry battalions of the four Army brigades.

== Radars ==
Name	Origin	Type	Quantity	Photo	Notes
3D
GM400α	France	Long-range surveillance	4		Deployed in the 126th Air Surveillance, Early Warning and Guidance Brigade.
GM200	France	Medium-range surveillance	6		Deployed in the 126th Air Surveillance, Early Warning and Guidance Brigade.
GS-40	France	Short-range surveillance and target acquisition	12		Deployed in the 126th Air Surveillance, Early Warning and Guidance Brigade.
Surface-to-air missile system components					Deployed in the 126th Air Surveillance, Early Warning and Guidance Brigade.
TTDR	China	Long range surveillance	1		Deployed in the 250th Air Defence Missile Brigade as part of HQ-22 system
H-200	China	Long-range surveillance and target acquisition	4		Deployed in the 250th Air Defence Missile Brigade as part of HQ-22 system
JSG-100	China	Long-range surveillance and target acquisition	4		Deployed in the 250th Air Defence Missile Brigade as part of HQ-22 system
P-18	Soviet Union	Medium-range surveillance and target acquisition	5		Deployed in the 250th Air Defence Missile Brigade as part of S-125 Neva system.
P-12	Soviet Union	Altitude measurement	5		Deployed in the 250th Air Defence Missile Brigade as part of S-125 Neva system.
P-40	Soviet Union	Medium-range surveillance and target acquisition	3		Deployed in the 250th Air Defence Missile Brigade as part of 2K12 Kub system.
PRV-16B	Soviet Union	Altitude measurement	3		Deployed in the 250th Air Defence Missile Brigade as part of 2K12 Kub system.
RPS-42	Israel	Short-range surveillance and target acquisition	60+		Deployed in air-defence artillery battalions of the four Army brigades as part of PASARS-16 system.
Giraffe	Sweden	Early-warning	18		Deployed in air-defence artillery battalions of the four Army brigades as part of PASARS-16 system.

== Electronic warfare ==
Name	Origin	Type	Quantity	Photo	Notes
Krasukha-4	Russia	Electronic warfare system	3		Deployed in the 224th Center for Electronic Action.
Krasukha-2	Russia	Electronic warfare system	1		Deployed in the 224th Center for Electronic Action.
Moskva-1	Russia	Electronic warfare system	3		Deployed in the 224th Center for Electronic Action.
Repellent-1	Russia	Anti-drone system			Deployed in the 224th Center for Electronic Action.
Kobac-1PR	Serbia	Anti-drone system			Deployed in the 224th Center for Electronic Action.
RG Vera	Serbia	Radio goniometer			Deployed in the 224th Center for Electronic Action.

== River vessels ==
Name	Origin	Type	Quantity	Photo	Notes
Ships
RPB-30 "Kozara"	Austria	Command ship	1		Deployed in the River Flotilla.
Neštin-class	Yugoslavia	Minesweeper	4		Deployed in the River Flotilla.
Biscaya-class	Yugoslavia	Patrol craft	3		Deployed in the River Flotilla.
411-class	Yugoslavia	Landing craft	5		Deployed in the River Flotilla.
RSRB-36 "Šabac"	Yugoslavia	Degaussing ship	1		Deployed in the River Flotilla.
RPN 43	Yugoslavia	Tanker	1		Deployed in the River Flotilla.
Boats
ČMP	Yugoslavia	Patrol boat	3		Deployed in the River Flotilla.
Premax 39	Serbia	Patrol boat	1		Deployed in the River Flotilla.
RIB 720	China	Rubber boat	24		Deployed in the 72nd Brigade for Special Operations (14) and the River Flotilla (10).

== Munitions ==
Name	Origin	Type	Quantity	Photo	Notes
Aircraft armaments
CM-400	China	Supersonic long-range anti-radiation missile			Used in the 101st Fighter Squadron of the 204th Air Brigade. CM-400AKG variant used on MiG-29SM multi-role fighters.
Kh-31	Soviet Union	Long-range anti-radiation missile			Used in the 101st Fighter Squadron of the 204th Air Brigade. Kh-31A and Kh-31P variants used on MiG-29SM multi-role fighters.
R-77	Russia	Medium-range air-to-air missile	32		Used in the 101st Fighter Squadron of the 204th Air Brigade. In use on MiG-29SM multi-role fighters.
R-73	Soviet Union	Short-range air-to-air missile			Used in the 101st Fighter Squadron of the 204th Air Brigade. R-73E variant used on MiG-29SM multi-role fighters.
R-60	Soviet Union	Short-range air-to-air missile			Used in the 101st Fighter Squadron of the 204th Air Brigade. R-60M and R-60K variants used on MiG-29SM multi-role fighters.
R-27	Soviet Union	Short-range air-to-air missile			Used in the 101st Fighter Squadron of the 204th Air Brigade. R-27ER1, R-27R1, R-27ET1 and R-27T1 variants used on MiG-29SM multi-role fighters.
Kh-29	Soviet Union	Short-range air-to-surface missile			Used in the 101st Fighter Squadron of the 204th Air Brigade. Kh-29TE variant used on MiG-29SM multi-role fighters.
Kh-25	Soviet Union	Short-range air-to-surface missile			Used in the 101st Fighter Squadron of the 204th Air Brigade. In use on MiG-29SM multi-role fighters.
AGM-65 Maverick	United States	Short-range air-to-surface missile	136		Used in the 241st Fighter-Bomber Squadron of the 98th Air Brigade. AGM-65B variant used on Soko J-22 Orao attack aircraft.
FZ275 LGR	Belgium	Ultra-short-range guided missile	600		Used in the 119th Mixed Helicopter Squadron of the 98th Air Brigade. In use on H145M helicopters.
9M120 Ataka	Russia	Ultra-short-range guided missile			Used by the 714th Anti-armour Helicopter Squadron of the 98th Air Brigade. In use on Mi-35 attack helicopters.
KAB-500	Soviet Union	Precision-guided bomb			Used in the 101st Fighter Squadron of the 204th Air Brigade. KAB-500Kr, KAB-500KrU and KAB-500-OD variants used on MiG-29SM multi-role fighters.
FT PGB	China	Precision-guided bomb			Used in the 353rd Reconnaissance Squadron of the 98th Air Brigade. FT-8B, FT-8C and FT-8D variants used on CH-92A, CH-95 and Pegaz unmanned combat aerial vehicles.
LS-6	China	Precision-guided bomb			Used in the 101st Fighter Squadron of the 204th Air Brigade. In use on MiG-29SM multi-role fighters.
S-24	Soviet Union	Unguided rocket			Used in the 101st Fighter Squadron of the 204th Air Brigade. In use on MiG-29SM multi-role fighters.
S-13	Soviet Union	Unguided rocket			Used in the 101st Fighter Squadron of the 204th Air Brigade. In use on MiG-29SM multi-role fighters.
S-5	Soviet Union	Unguided rocket			Used in the 101st Fighter Squadron of the 204th Air Brigade. In use on MiG-29SM multi-role fighters.
S-8	Soviet Union	Unguided rocket			Used by the 714th Anti-armour Helicopter Squadron of the 98th Air Brigade. In use on Mi-35 attack helicopters.
FAB-500	Soviet Union	General-purpose bomb			Used in the 101st Fighter Squadron of the 204th Air Brigade. In use on MiG-29SM multi-role fighters.
FAB-250	Soviet Union	General-purpose bomb			Used in the 101st Fighter Squadron of the 204th Air Brigade. In use on MiG-29SM multi-role fighters.
FAB-100	Soviet Union	General-purpose bomb			Used in the 101st Fighter Squadron of the 204th Air Brigade. In use on MiG-29SM multi-role fighters.
FAB-50	Soviet Union	General-purpose bomb			Used in the 101st Fighter Squadron of the 204th Air Brigade. In use on MiG-29SM multi-role fighters.
Anti-tank guided missiles
ALAS	Serbia	Anti-tank guided missile	60		Used by the multiple rocket launcher artillery battalions of the four Army brigades. In use on M18 Oganj multiple rocket launchers.
9M133 Kornet	Russia	Anti-tank guided missile			Used by the 72nd Brigade for Special Operations. In use on Humvee armored vehicles and 9P163-1 tripod launchers.
9M119 Svir/Refleks	Russia	Anti-tank guided missile			Used by the T-72M Tank Battalion of the Army Command. In use on T-72B1MS tanks.
9K111 Fagot	Soviet Union	Anti-tank wire-guided missile	250		Used by infantry battalions of the four Army brigades. In use on POLK tripod launchers.
9K11 Malyutka	Soviet Union	Anti-tank wire-guided missile			Used by infantry battalions of the four Army brigades. Modernized 2T5 variant used on BOV-1 POLO M83 tank destroyers.

== Sources ==
- IISS (2022), The Military Balance 2022, The International Institute for Strategic Studies (IISS), ISBN 9781000619720
- Srpski Oklop. "Oklopne jedinice Vojske Srbije". Srpski Oklop. (in Serbian)
