= M-84 =

Yugoslav T-72 variant

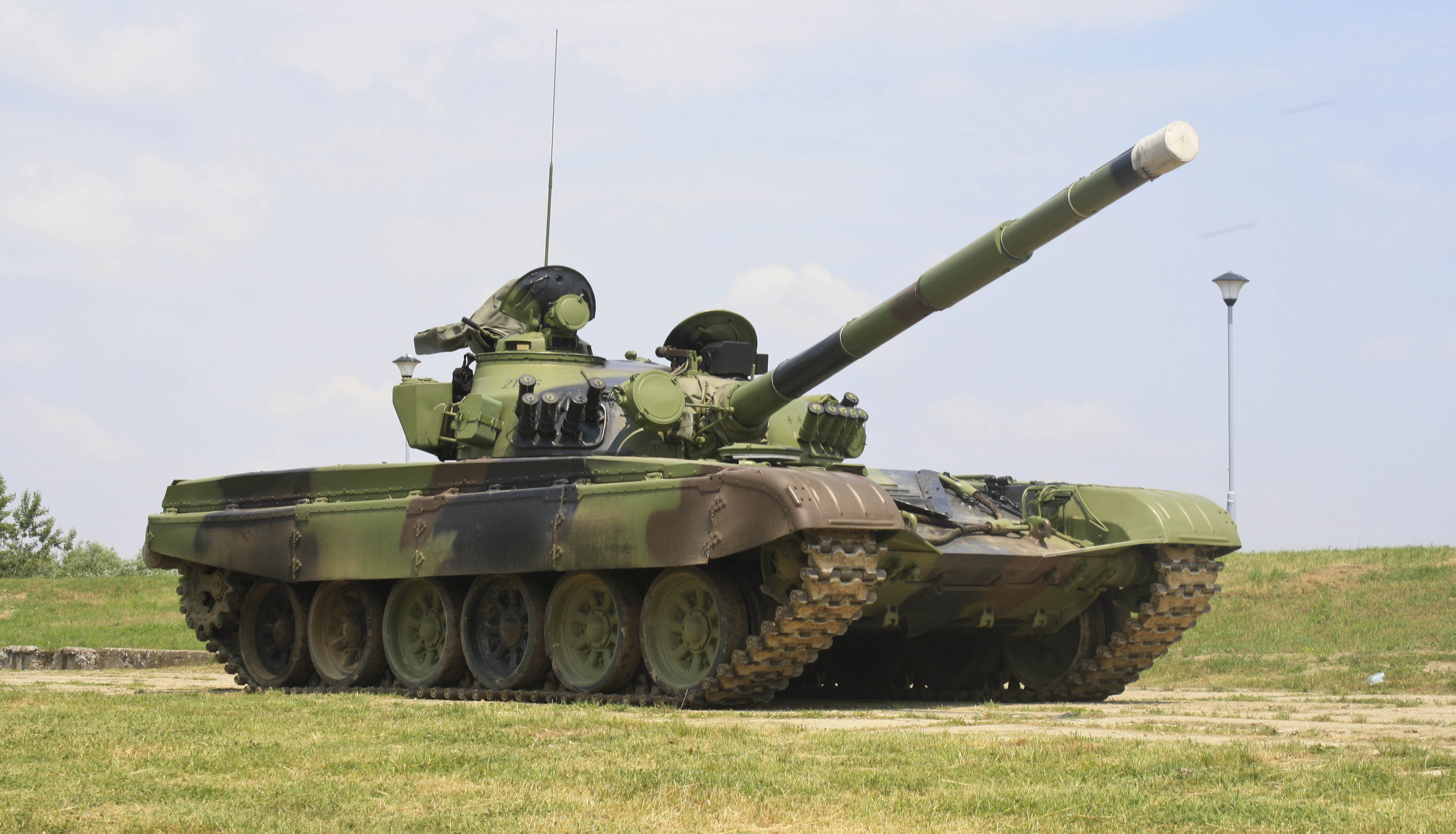
- Serbian Army M-84 tank
- Type: Main battle tank
- Place of origin: Yugoslavia

Service history
- In service: 1984–present
- Wars: Persian Gulf War; Yugoslav Wars; Ten-Day War; Croatian War of Independence; Bosnian War; Kosovo War; Insurgency in the Preševo Valley; Russo-Ukrainian War

Production history
- Designer: Military Technical Institute
- Designed: 1979‒1983
- Manufacturer: Đuro Đaković
- Produced: 1984‒1991 (Yugoslavia); 1992‒2003 (Croatian modernization); 2004‒2025 (Serbian modernization)
- No. built: ~680

Specifications
- Mass: 41.5 tonnes
- Length: 6.86 m (9.53m with the gun)
- Width: 3.57 m
- Height: 2.19 m
- Crew: 3 (commander, gunner, driver)
- Armor: composite alloy; including high-hardness steel, glass-reinforced plastic, RHA steel, and either sand or granite in the front of turret (M-84A).
- Main armament: 125 mm 2A46 smoothbore gun
- Secondary armament: 1× 7.62 mm coaxial machine gun 1× 12.7mm anti-aircraft gun 5× smoke grenade launchers
- Engine: diesel V-46TK; 1,000 hp (750 kW)
- Power/weight: 24.10 hp/tonne
- Suspension: torsion bar
- Fuel capacity: 1200 + 400l
- Operational range: 700 km
- Maximum speed: 68 km/h

The M-84 is a Yugoslav main battle tank based on the Soviet T-72. It is still in service with Bosnia and Herzegovina, Croatia, Serbia, Slovenia, Kuwait, and Ukraine.

== Development and production ==
=== Development ===
The M-84 was designed and developed by the Military Technical Institute in Belgrade. It is based on the Soviet T-72M, the export variant of T-72A, brought to T-72M1 standard, with many improvements, including a domestic fire-control system that the T-72M lacked, improved composite armor, and a 1,000-hp engine. The M-84 entered service with the Yugoslav People's Army in 1984, and the improved M-84A version entered service a few years later, the M-84A housing an upgraded engine. Other variants were introduced later, most being modernization packages.

=== Production in Yugoslavia ===
About 240 Yugoslav factories directly participated in the production of the M-84, and about 1,000 others participated indirectly. The manufacturer was chosen by Josip Broz Tito to be the Đuro Đaković in Croatia, over other proposed manufacturers in Serbia: IMK 14. oktobar Kruševac, Goša FOM Smederevska Palanka and Mašinska Industrija Niš, at that time the biggest producers of locomotives and wagons in Yugoslavia. The biggest manufacturers directly involved in production of the M-84 main battle tank in SFR Yugoslavia and Federal Republic of Yugoslavia among former republics were:

- Đuro Đaković, Slavonski Brod, Croatia – integrator and assembler, tank hull, metalwork, maintenance, LCS
- Bratstvo, Novi Travnik, Bosnia and Herzegovina – 125mm gun
- Slovenske železarne, Ravne, Slovenia – steel, turret and armor
- Iskra, Slovenia – laser designation
- FAMOS, Sarajevo, Bosnia and Herzegovina – engine
- PPT-Petoletka, Trstenik, Serbia – hydraulics and turret movement system
- ATB Sever, Subotica, Serbia – automatic loading system
- Rudi Čajavec, Banja Luka, Bosnia and Herzegovina – electronics and communications systems
- Zrak, Sarajevo, Bosnia and Herzegovina – optics
- Pretis, Vogošća, Bosnia and Herzegovina – ammunition
- Sloboda, Čačak, Serbia – ammunition
- Zastava Arms, Kragujevac, Serbia – coaxial 7.62mm and anti-aircraft 12.7mm machine gun
- Metalski Zavod Tito, Skopje, North Macedonia – transmission parts
- 14. oktobar, Kruševac, Serbia – engine and transmission parts

=== Production and development in Serbia ===
- Technical Overhaul Institute "Čačak", Čačak – integrator and assembler, reactive armor and other armor
- ATB Sever, Subotica – automatic loading system
- Sloboda, Čačak – ammunition and smoke discharge units
- PPT Namenska, Trstenik – hydraulics, transmission parts and turret movement system
- Teleoptik-žiroskopi, Zemun – optics, gyroscopes and gyroscopic devices and Fire-control system with software, electronics and electronic elements of active protection system
- Zastava kovačnica, Kragujevac – tank tracks
- 14. oktobar, Kruševac – modular tank engine, engine and transmission parts, shell parts for ammunition
- Yugoimport SDPR, Velika Plana – 125mm gun and barrels, welded turrets, RCWS, radiological-chemical subsystem, fire suppression subsystems
- Imtel komunikacije, Belgrade – radar warning and direction finding system (part of protection system)
- Zastava Arms, Kragujevac – machine-guns 12.7mm and coaxial 7.62mm

=== Exports ===
About 150 M-84 tanks were exported to Kuwait. The disintegration of Yugoslavia in the 1990s prevented further exports of the M-84. Sales of the M-84 including negotiations of contracts with foreign partners were done through Yugoimport SDPR, at that time acting as a Yugoslav state agency. Production and delivery was performed by Đuro Đaković.

== Design ==
=== Armament ===
The M-84A is armed with a 125 mm smoothbore cannon derived from the Soviet 2A46. The fume extractor positioned in the middle of the barrel is shielded with a thermal coating that minimizes deformation of the barrel from high temperatures and ensures it is cooled at the same rate during rapid firing. The M-84 uses an automatic loader, which enables it to sustain a firing rate of 8 rounds per minute.

The cannon's 40 rounds of ammunition are stowed in the hull of the tank beneath the turret. This concept was inherited from the original Soviet design for the T-72, and is both a strength and weakness of the tank. The lower hull beneath the turret is one of the least likely place to be hit and penetrated by antitank rounds or mines, but in the event of penetration and secondary detonation of the ammunition the crew and tank are unlikely to survive the resulting catastrophic explosion.

Along with its primary armament, the M-84 is also armed with one 7.62mm coaxial machine gun, and one 12.7mm anti-aircraft gun mounted on the commander's turret.

All versions of the M-84 have a crew of three. The commander sits on the right side of the turret, the gunner on the left, and the driver sits centrally at the front of the vehicle. Like most Soviet-derived vehicles, the M-84 series of tanks have an autoloader rather than a manual loader.

=== Protection ===
The basic tank has a cast steel turret with maximal thickness of 410mm; later, in the M-84A version, a segment made out of a non-metal, most likely rubber and boron carbide (see Chobham armour), was sandwiched between layers of steel. The glacis uses laminate armor, glass in plastic resin between two steel plates; in the A version a 16mm steel plate was welded on the glacis. Total armor protection ranges between 550mm-650mm for the glacis and 560mm-700mm for the turret. During the wars in Yugoslavia the M-84's frontal armor proved very effective against any type of AT threat. Side or rear hits often result in a catastrophic ammo explosion.

Twelve smoke grenades are positioned in front of the turret in banks of five and seven grenades. Night vision and gunner's sights are positioned on the top-right side of the turret. The M-84 has a searchlight used in short-range combat situations.

The M-84 tank has nuclear, biological and chemical (NBC) protection capabilities.

=== Mobility ===
The base M-84 engine is a 12-cylinder water-cooled V46-6 diesel engine, rated at 574 kW (780 hp). The improved M-84A has a more powerful, V46-TK 735 kW (1,000 hp) engine. With maximum fuel load of 1,200 litres the tank's range is 450 km, extendable to 650 km, with external fuel tanks.

The Croatian-made variants have enhanced power plants. The M-84A4 Sniper model has a German-built 820 kW (1,100 hp) engine, while the M-84D has an 895 kW (1,200 hp) engine, the most powerful of all M-84 variants. The M-84D also has greater fuel capacity (1,450 litres).

The tank can ford 1.2 meters of water, increasing to 5 meters with a snorkel.

== Variants ==
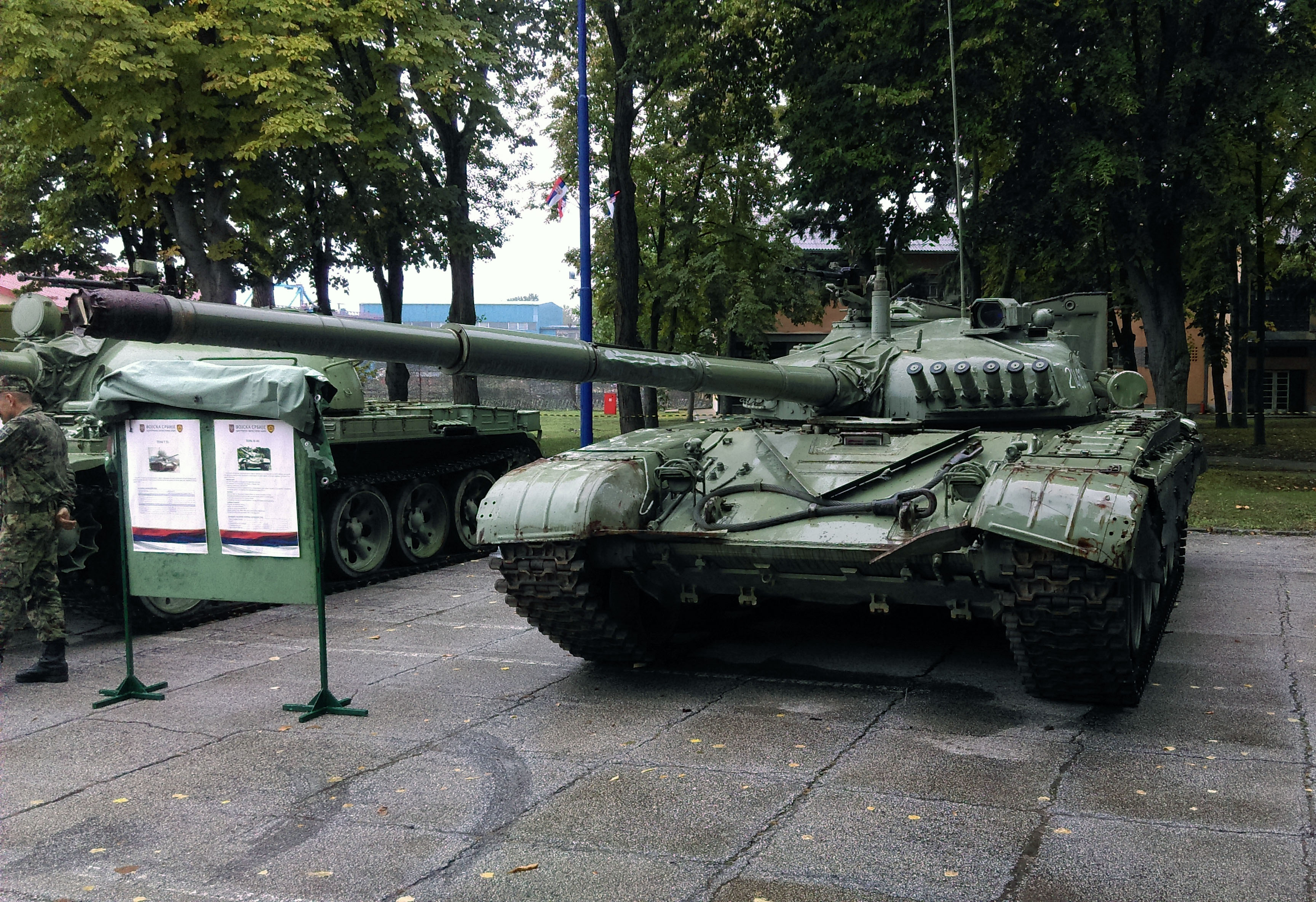
M-84A

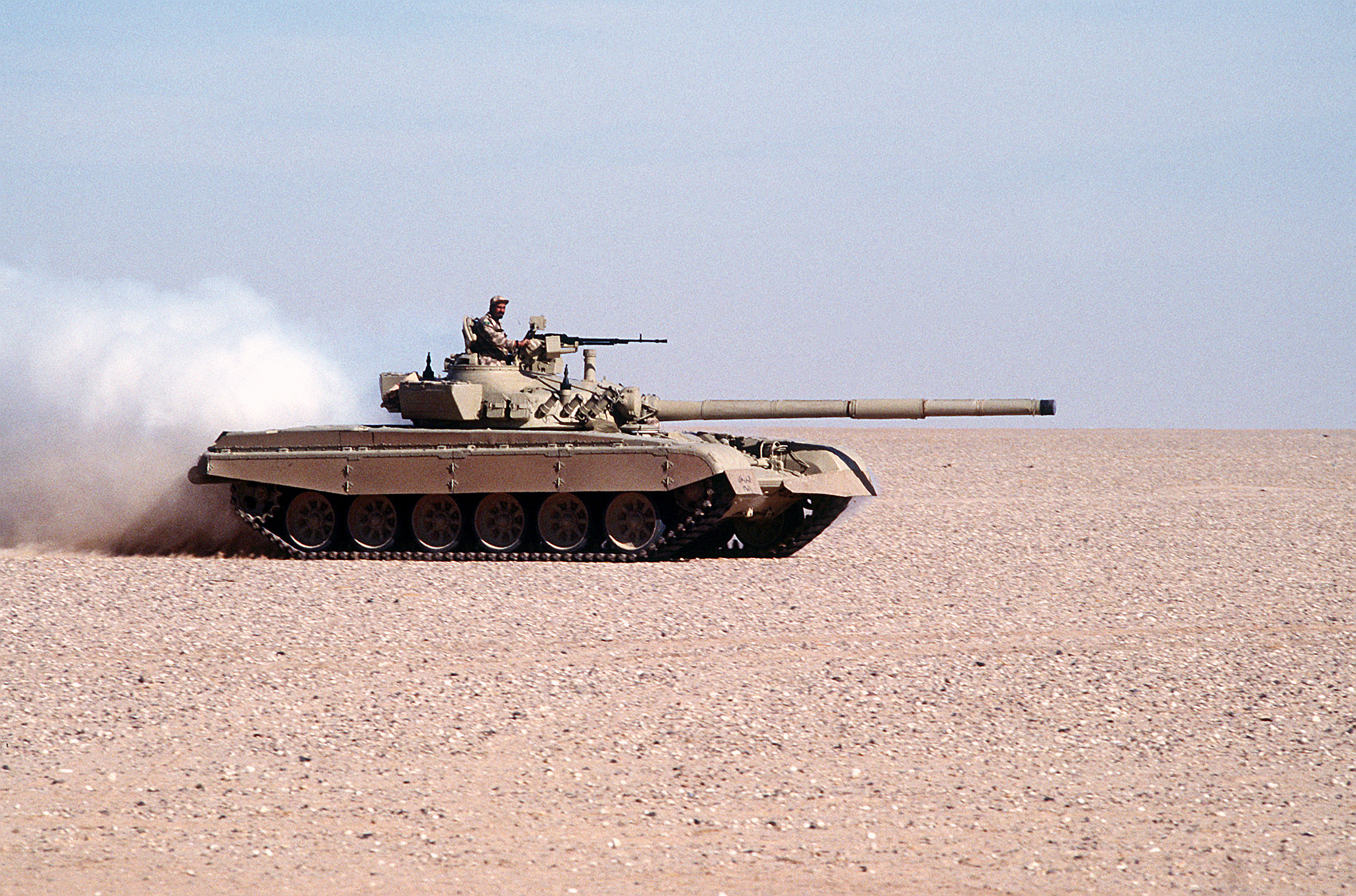
M-84AB

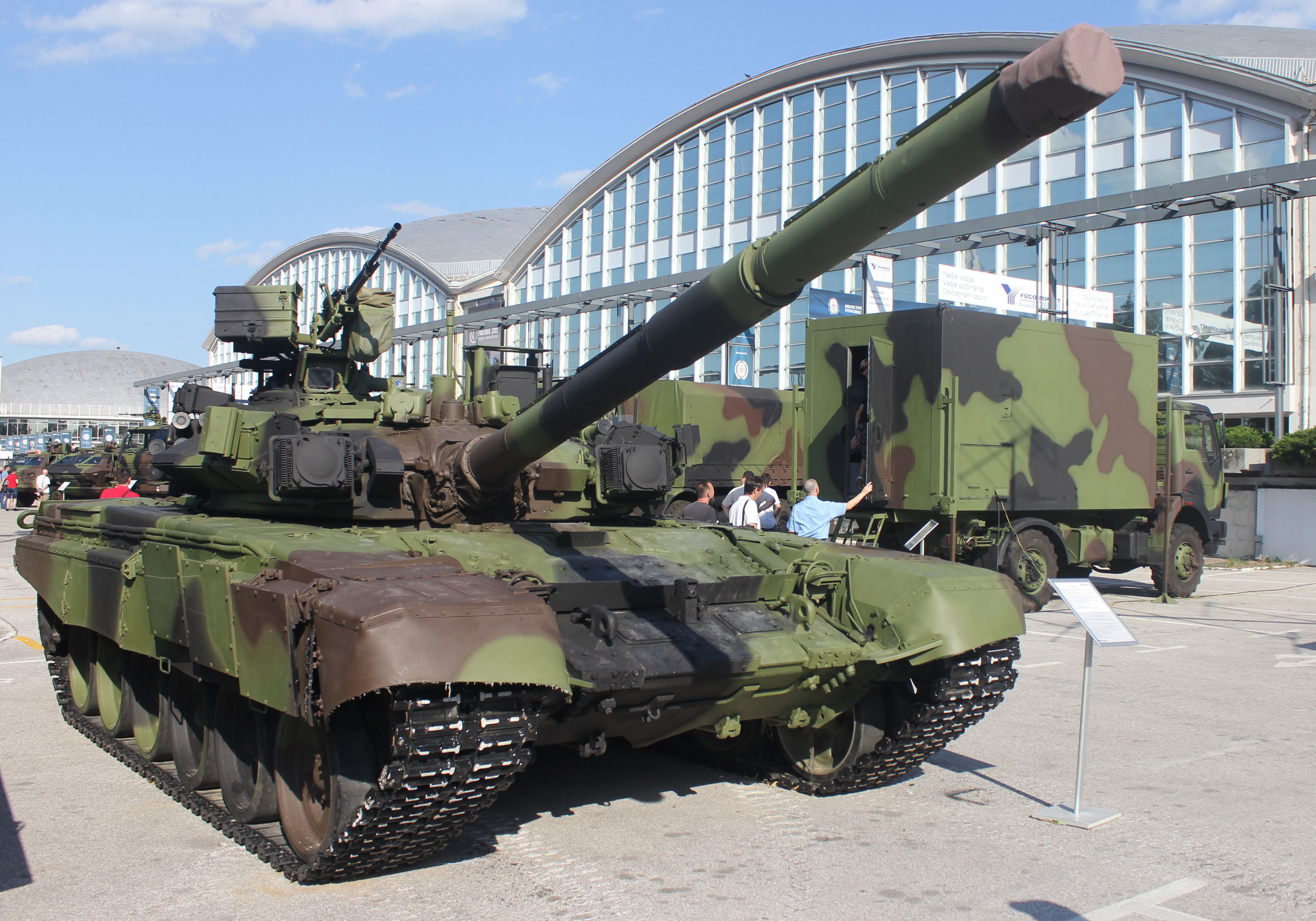
M-84AB1

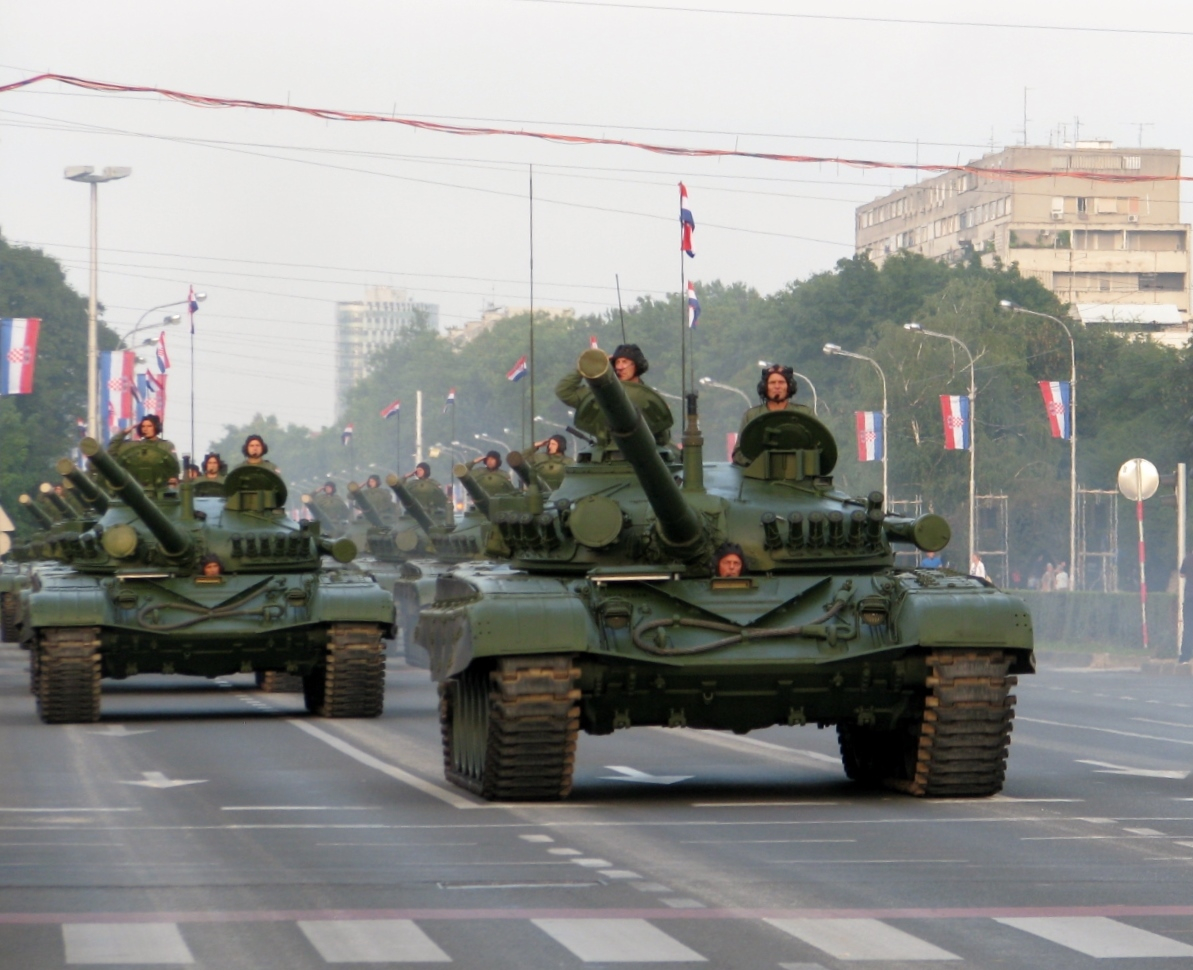
M-84A4

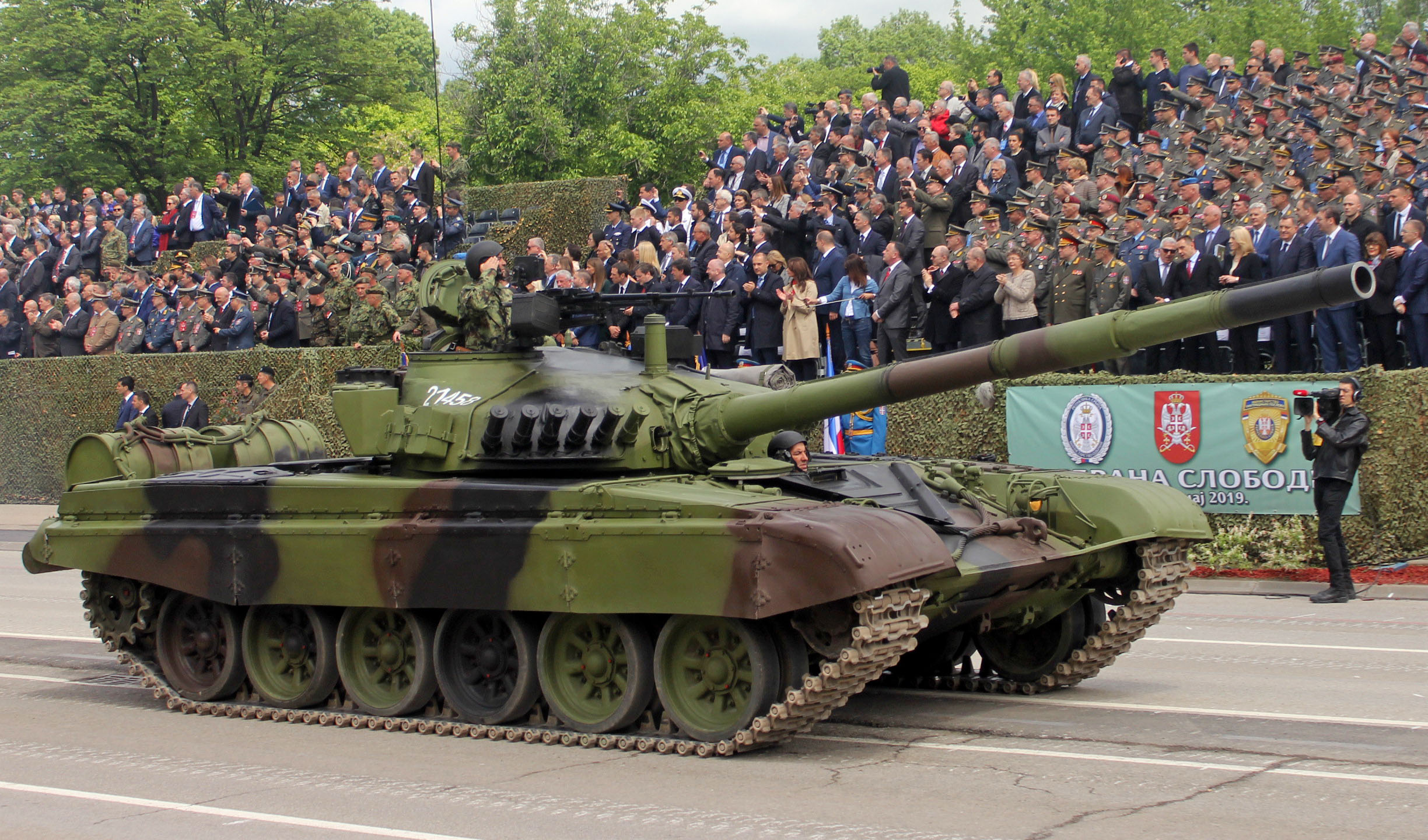
M-84AK

- M-84 (Yugoslavia) – initial version based on the Soviet T-72M and produced between 1984 and 1987. Less than 150 units manufactured
- M-84A (Yugoslavia) – upgraded version similar to the Soviet T-72M1 but with a significantly more powerful engine and additional armour plating. It comes with the new SUV-M-84 computerized fire-control system, including the DNNS-2 gunner's day/night sight, with independent stabilization in two planes and integral laser rangefinder. It also comes with the TNP-160 periscope, TNPA-65 auxiliary periscope, and DNKS-2 day/night commander's periscopes, as well as the TNPO-168V driver's periscope. Produced between 1988 and 1991, closely analogous to the M-84AB. Roughly 450 vehicles manufactured including the M-84AB
- M-84AB (Yugoslavia) – Kuwaiti version of the M-84A, fitted with new communication and intercom systems. The Kuwaiti 35th Ash-Shahid (Martyr's) Armoured Brigade, armed with several dozen M-84ABs, took part in Operation Desert Storm. During the fighting two M-84ABs were lost, but both were later recovered. Kuwait originally ordered over 200 tanks, but received only 150 before the break-up of Yugoslavia and the end of tank production. All instruments marked in English and Arabic
- M-84ABN (Yugoslavia) – M-84AB fitted with land navigation equipment
- M-84AK / ABK Command Tank (Yugoslavia) – M-84AB version fitted with extensive communication equipment, land navigation equipment, and a generator for the command role
- M-91 Vihor (Yugoslavia) – further development of the M-84, with the main focus being improving the tank's firepower by installing modern optics and developing improved APFSDS shells. The turret was also redesigned, and some sources say that a new 1200 HP engine was planned. At least 2 prototypes were made before the outbreak of the civil war
- M-84A4 Sniper (Croatia) – this version includes the all-new SCS-84 day/night sight, DBR-84 ballistic computer, improved elevation and traverse sensors, and EFCS-3 fire control system. Croatia purchased around 40 of these models from 1996 till 2003 from its domestic factory. It is rumored, but not officially confirmed, that these tanks have a different engine of German origin, rated at 1,100 hp instead of the 1,000 hp engine originally installed. A Racal communication suite replaced the older communication set. By 2008 the entire Croatian M-84 tank fleet had been upgraded to the M-84A4 standard
- M-84AI armoured recovery vehicle (Yugoslavia and Poland) – during the mid-1990s Kuwait requested an armoured recovery vehicle variant of the M-84A tank as part of the deal to buy a large batch of M-84A tanks. The vehicle had to be developed in very short time so it was decided that it should be based on an already working foreign vehicle rather than designed and built independently. The Polish WZT-3 license was bought and Polish parts were used in the M-84AI project completed in the "14 October" factory in Kruševac. There was also a plan for a M-84ABI for Kuwait, but this idea failed. It is armed only with a 12.7mm machine-gun fitted to the commander's hatch and 12 smoke grenade mortars (8 right and 4 left). Standard equipment includes: A TD-50 crane, front-mounted stabilizing dozer blade, main and secondary winches.
- M-84D (Croatia) – this variant brings existing M-84 variants to the M-84D standard, equipped with a new 1,200 hp (895 kW) engine and new RRAK ERA armour. The M-84D is equipped with a Samson Remote Controlled Weapon Station and a new Omega ballistic computer (Slovenian Fotona-made digital ballistic computer). M-84D has an operational range of 700 km and a maximum speed of 65 km/h. It also has a 15% faster auto loader, enabling a rate of fire of 9, rather than 8, rounds per minute. The M-84D is a second version of the upgraded tanks. It has also chains on the back of the tank to protect the engine and has SLAT armor around the ammunition to prevent an ATGM or a shell from hitting it. M-84D received few additional upgrades, Turret basket was added to provide extra space for extra ammunition and to provide increased armor protection. Turret basket has additional slat armor, which adds additional armor to the exterior of the tank. M-84D and M-84A4 are to receive 12.7mm Kongsberg Protector Remote Weapon Stations which are to be integrated on to all M-84D and M-84A4 tanks. M-84D will also feature LIRD-4B – Laser irradiation detector and warner and LAHAT anti tank missiles. There is a potential for integration of Swiss 120 mm compact gun developed by RUAG. This option is being now seriously considered as this would allow Croatia to use NATO 120 m standard ammunition. 120 mm RUAG compact gun is a preferred option over German Rheinmetall L44 120 mm cannon which is more expensive and would require German support, whereas RUAG will provide technical know how and technology transfer to Đuro Đaković specijalna vozila d.d. Only two Croatian tanks have been upgraded to this standard due to budgetary restraints
- M-84AS (Serbia) – upgraded variant of the M-84A, project failed to advance to serial production. New fire control system, new armor consisting of cylindrical pad, high-hardness steel, titanium, aluminum, and NERA as well as modular Kontakt-5 armor, new AT-11 Sniper and Agava-2 thermal sights, and the Shtora defense suite, were all added. The first public appearance of the M-84AS was in 2004 at the Nikinci testing ground. It was very similar to the Russian T-90S, both in appearance and in capability; the differences reportedly consisted of better armour on the T-90S, whereas the M-84AS has superior maneuverability. The M-84AS was also tested by the Kuwaiti Army as part of an international tender. New thermal imaging cameras were mounted for the commander and driver so that the tank can operate at night. It was fitted with the 125 mm 2A46M smooth-bore gun and a 1,200 hp diesel engine giving a maximum speed of 72 km/h.

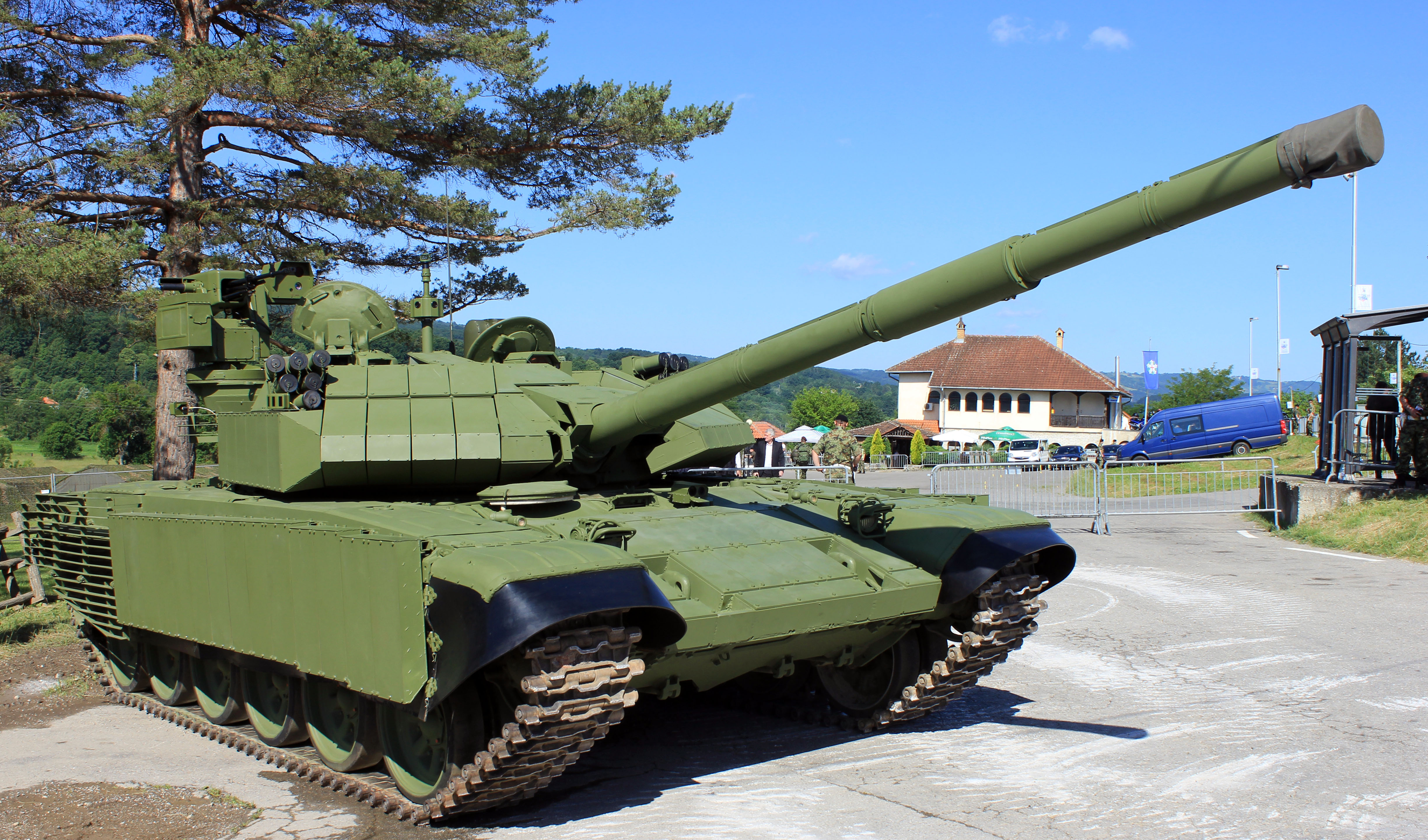
M-84AS1

- M-84AS1 (Serbia) – upgraded variant of the M-84AS, project failed to advance to serial production. Additional armour, including explosive reactive armour, integrated day-night sighting system with thermal imager, command information system, a soft-kill active protection system, new radio system, Remote-controlled weapons station with 12.7 mm machine gun, and CBRN protection equipment were all added.

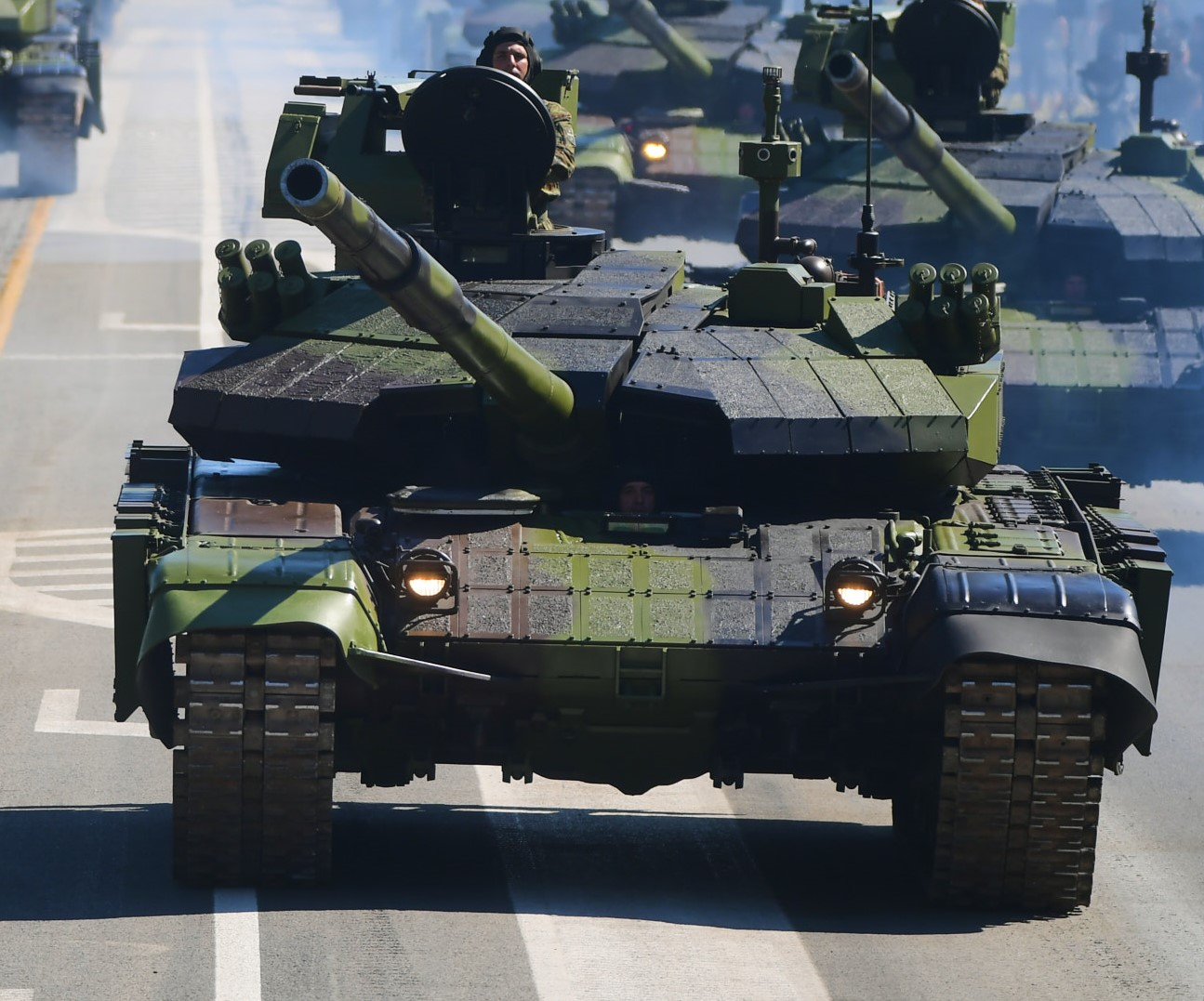
M-84AS2

- M-84AS2 (Serbia) – upgraded variant of the M-84AS1, officially unveiled in 2020 and in serial production since 2024. The M-84AS2, tailored for platoon commanders, builds on the earlier AS1 prototype with refined subsystems. Its 125mm smoothbore gun, a Zastava-made evolution of the 2A46M, uses an autoloader to maintain an eight-round-per-minute firing rate, with ammunition including APFSDS rounds penetrating 500mm of armor at 2 km, programmable airburst munitions for infantry, and Refleks ATGMs for targets up to 5 km. A thermal sleeve improves barrel durability during sustained fire. The AS2's protection suite features the domestically developed M19 explosive reactive armor (ERA), with enhanced coverage on the turret roof to counter top-attack threats like drones. Slat armor guards against RPGs, while a soft-kill active protection system, inspired by Russia's Shtora-1, uses multispectral smoke and laser jammers to disrupt incoming missiles. A 360-degree laser and radar warning system alerts the crew to threats, complemented by automatic fire suppression and NBC (nuclear, biological, chemical) protection. The fire-control system includes a GEN III cooled thermal imager, short-wave infrared camera, and laser rangefinder, enabling target detection at 18 km. The commander's stabilized panoramic sight supports hunter-killer operations, while a battlefield management system links the tank to broader networks. A stabilized 12.7mm remote-controlled weapon station (RCWS) engages drones and infantry safely. Powered by a 1,000 hp V-46-TK diesel engine (upgradable to 1,200 hp), the 46-ton tank hits 60 km/h on roads and 45 km/h off-road, with a 600 km range. Upgraded tracks and suspension extend component life to 8,000 km.
- M-84AS3 (Serbia) – upgraded variant of the M-84AS2, officially unveiled in 2025. It features an active protection system (likely of Israeli origin) similar to the Iron Fist system by Elbit Systems, designed to intercept incoming projectiles. The armor has been significantly enhanced with extended explosive reactive armour modules covering the entire length of the hull, replacing the previous lattice protection around the engine compartment. The turret includes a new niche whose function may be related to an upgraded autoloader or integration of additional subsystems. The fire control system has been modernized with an integrated day/night sighting system including thermal imager, laser warning receivers, and new sensors for improved situational awareness and targeting accuracy. The tank retains the 125 mm main gun with a thermal sleeve and supports a range of ammunition including programmable high-explosive and armor-piercing rounds. It is also equipped with a remote-controlled weapons station armed with a 12.7 mm heavy machine gun. Additional features include upgraded communications radios and CBRN protection systems. Though a proposal for a domestic-developed 1200 HP engine upgrade exists, the current powerplant remains close to previous versions, estimated around 1000 HP diesel engines.

== Operational history ==
=== Desert Storm ===
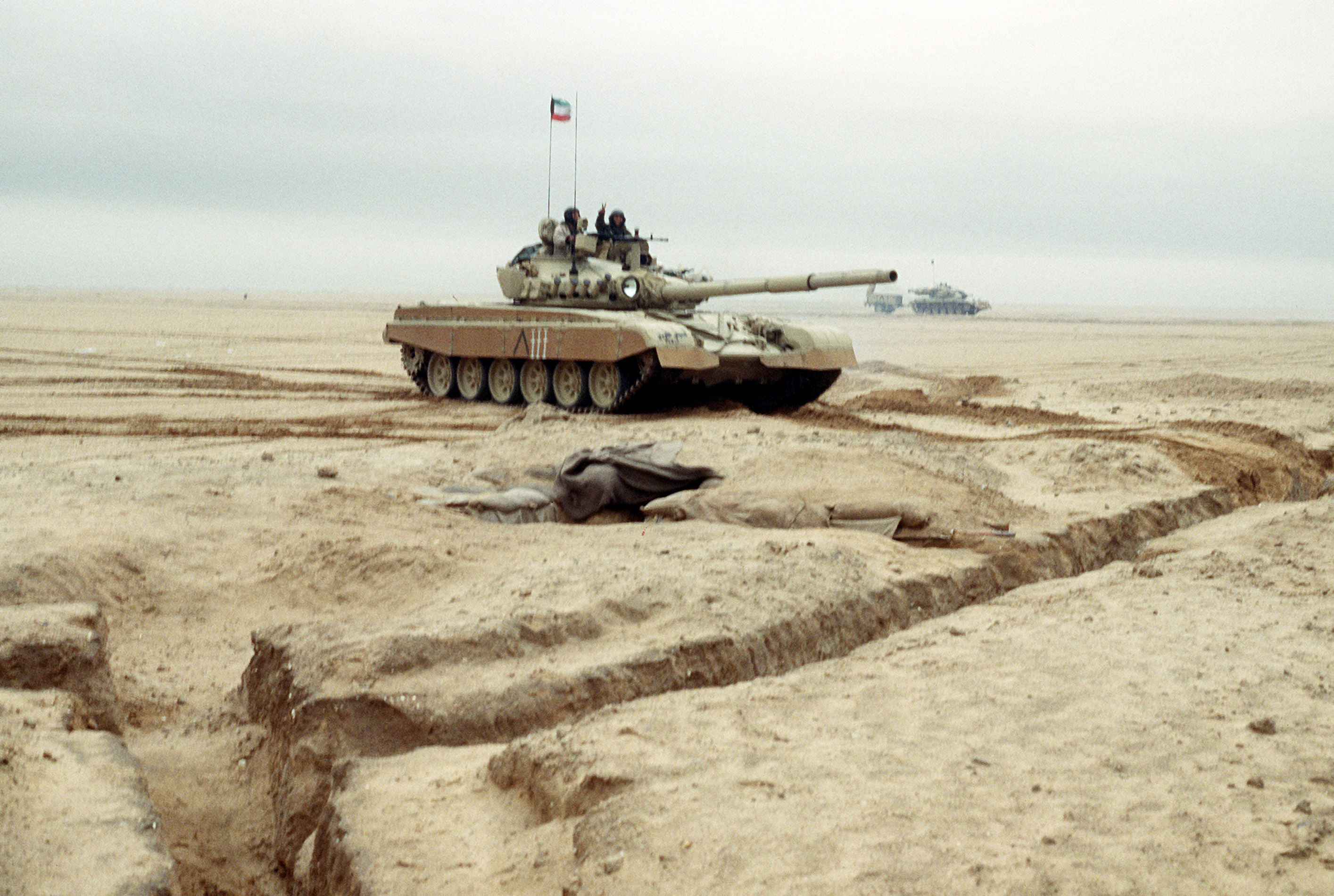
A Kuwaiti M-84 during Operation Desert Shield

Before the Persian Gulf War, Kuwait ordered 170 M-84ABs, 15 M-84ABI ARVs and 15 M-84ABK command tanks, from Yugoslavia. Four M-84A tanks were delivered; however, the Iraqi Army soon captured them after the occupation. Further deliveries were stopped for the duration of the war. The Kuwaiti 35th Al-Shaheed Armored Brigade was equipped with 70 M-84s. During the retaking of the country, the 35th Brigade did not directly take part in battles with Iraqi tanks because of the M-84's similarity to Iraqi T-72 or Asad Babils. The M-84 was however very effective against T-62s and T-55s but some unconfirmed reports claim that a few of them were damaged, but recovered and repaired.

=== Yugoslav Wars ===
==== Slovenia ====
During the Ten-Day War, the Yugoslav People's Army (JNA) sent two armoured columns, each one spearheaded by ten M-84s from the 1st Armoured Brigade to secure the Brnik Airport. One tank was abandoned en route due a mechanical breakdown and after the crew was rescued by a Gazelle helicopter, Slovenian Territorial Defence (TOS) forces retrieved everything they could from the tank before setting it on fire, resulting in an explosion that tore off the turret. Another tank was damaged after its crew fired their machine guns on a car carrying two Austrian journalists mistaken for TOS tank hunters carrying Armbrusts, allowing a Slovene to sneak up and fire a single anti-tank rocket that wounded the commander of the I Battalion of 1st Armoured Brigade, while the Slovene was killed by small arms fire.

A relief column spearheaded by M-84s of the 4th Armoured Brigade was sent to destroy a Slovenian roadblock and then protect a surface-to-air missile site protecting the Cerklje Air Base, but it came under attack from the TOS. The Yugoslav Air Force sent a J-21 Jastreb to destroy the roadblock, but the Slovenes managed to blow up a M-84, halting the column's advance. After repeated counterattacks by the TOS, the JNA was forced to withdraw without reaching Cerklje AB.

==== Croatia ====
The M-84 saw action in the Battle of Vukovar, where the JNA employed tanks against Croatian National Guardsmen (ZNG). Although the JNA ultimately prevailed, it's estimated they've lost around 100 tanks, including 20 M-84s to minefields and ambushes by ZNG anti-tank teams. Four of these M-84 tanks were knocked out during an ambush on Trpinjska Road, though entrenched JNA M-84s were successful in defeating a Croatian counteroffensive, knocking out three T-55 tanks.

==== Bosnia and Herzegovina ====
During the Bosnian War, M-84s were used by Croatian forces in the Krajina region, and in the Siege of Sarajevo by both the Army of Republika Srpska (VRS) and (in smaller numbers) the Army of the Republic of Bosnia and Herzegovina.

In the mountainous terrain of the Bosnian theater, the limited main gun elevation/depression proved to be a problem, while the use of Pakistani-supplied HJ-8 anti-tank guided missiles by Bosnian forces proved to be a threat. While the frontal armor of the M-84 was reportedly never penetrated during the conflict, around 40 M-84s were lost by all sides (though some were repairable) at the end of the conflict, mostly from hits at the thinner lower-side armor or anti-tank mines penetrating the belly armor, causing the ammunition stored in the crew compartment to detonate, often resulting in turrets popping off.

==== Preševo Valley ====
The M-84 was used by Yugoslav ground forces in the Battle of Oraovica during the Insurgency in the Preševo Valley.

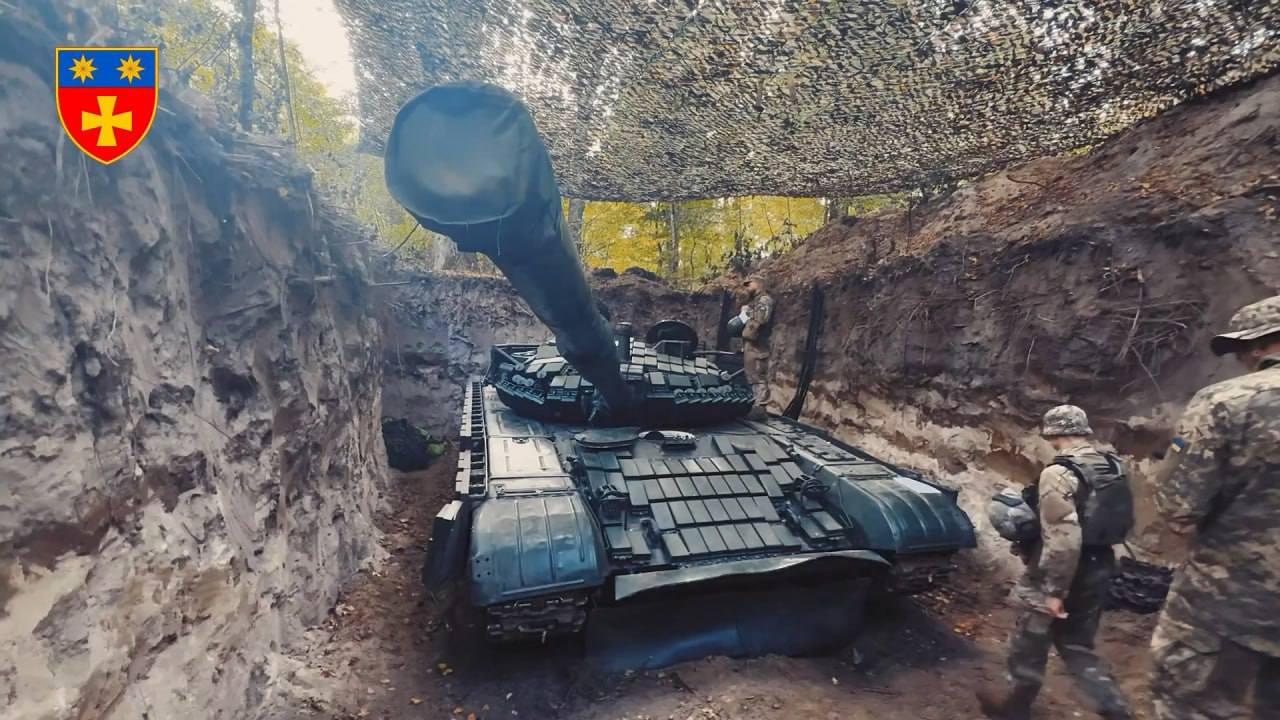
Ukrainian M-84A4 Sniper tank with Kontakt-1 reactive armor added.

=== Russo-Ukrainian War ===
In September 2025, Ukrainian 141st Separate Mechanized Brigade was seen using Croatian M-84A4 tanks first delivered in December 2024. The site Oryx records the confirmed loss of at least one Ukrainian M-84A4 on 30 June 2026.

== Operators ==
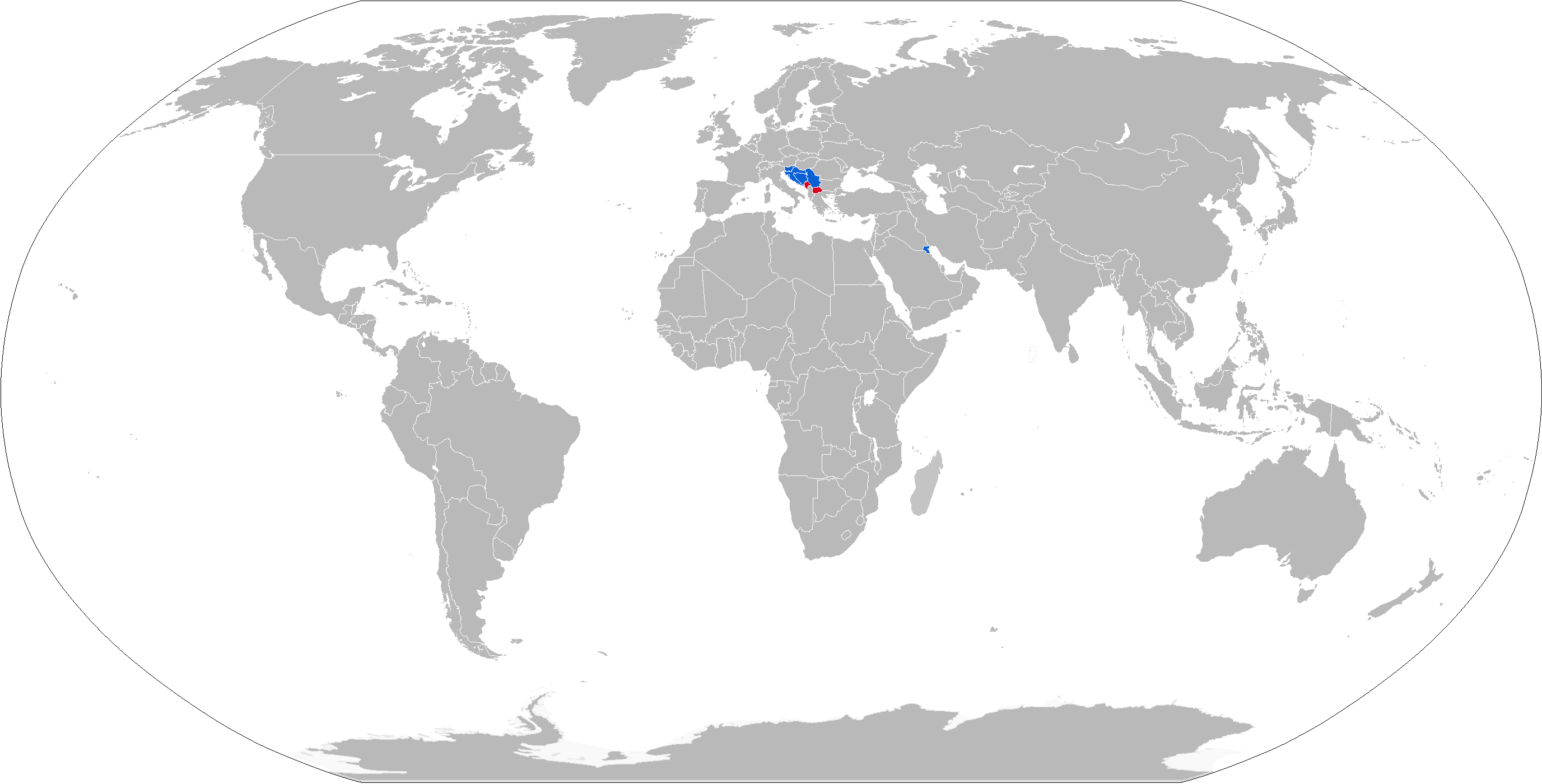
Map with M-84 operators in blue with former operators in red

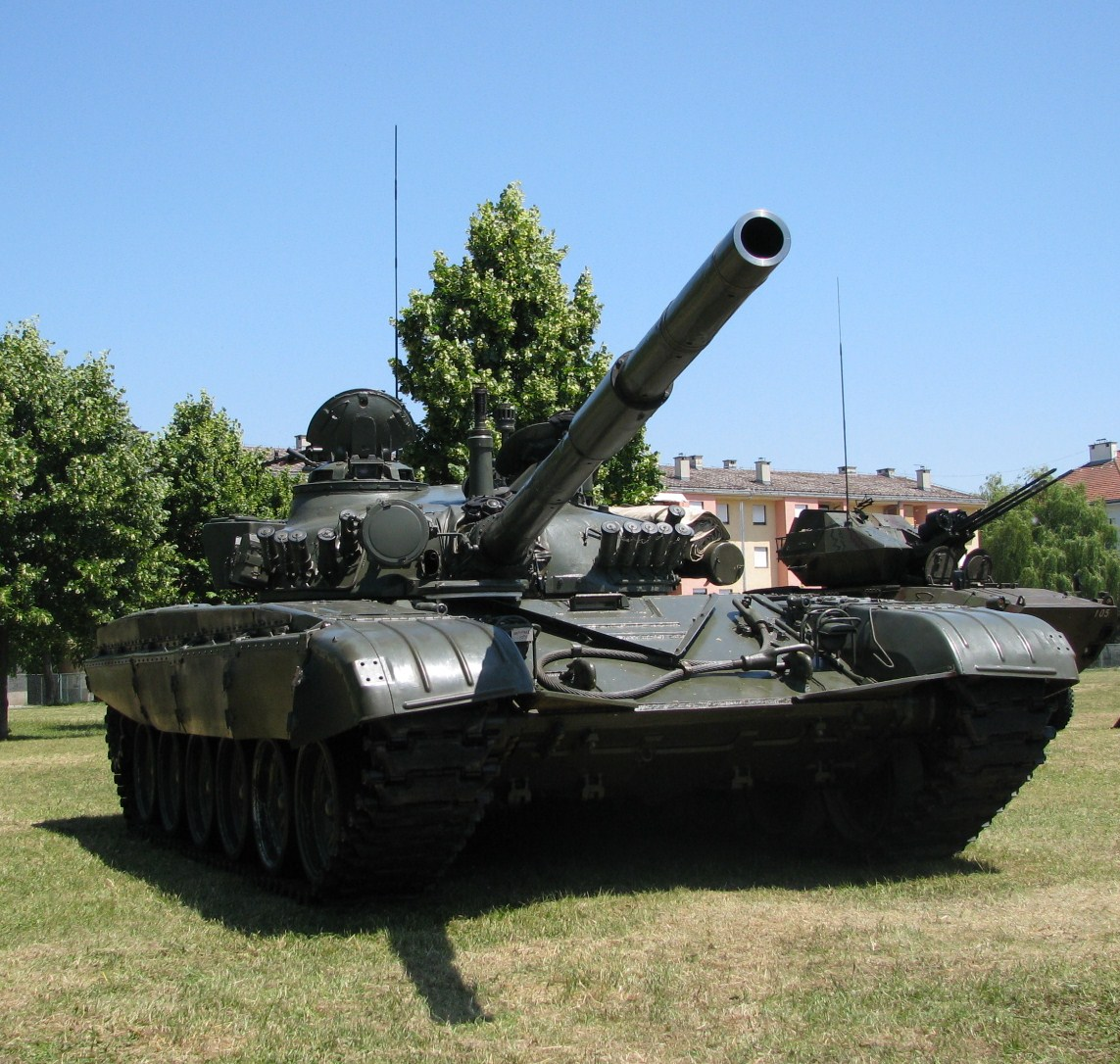
Croatian Army M-84A4

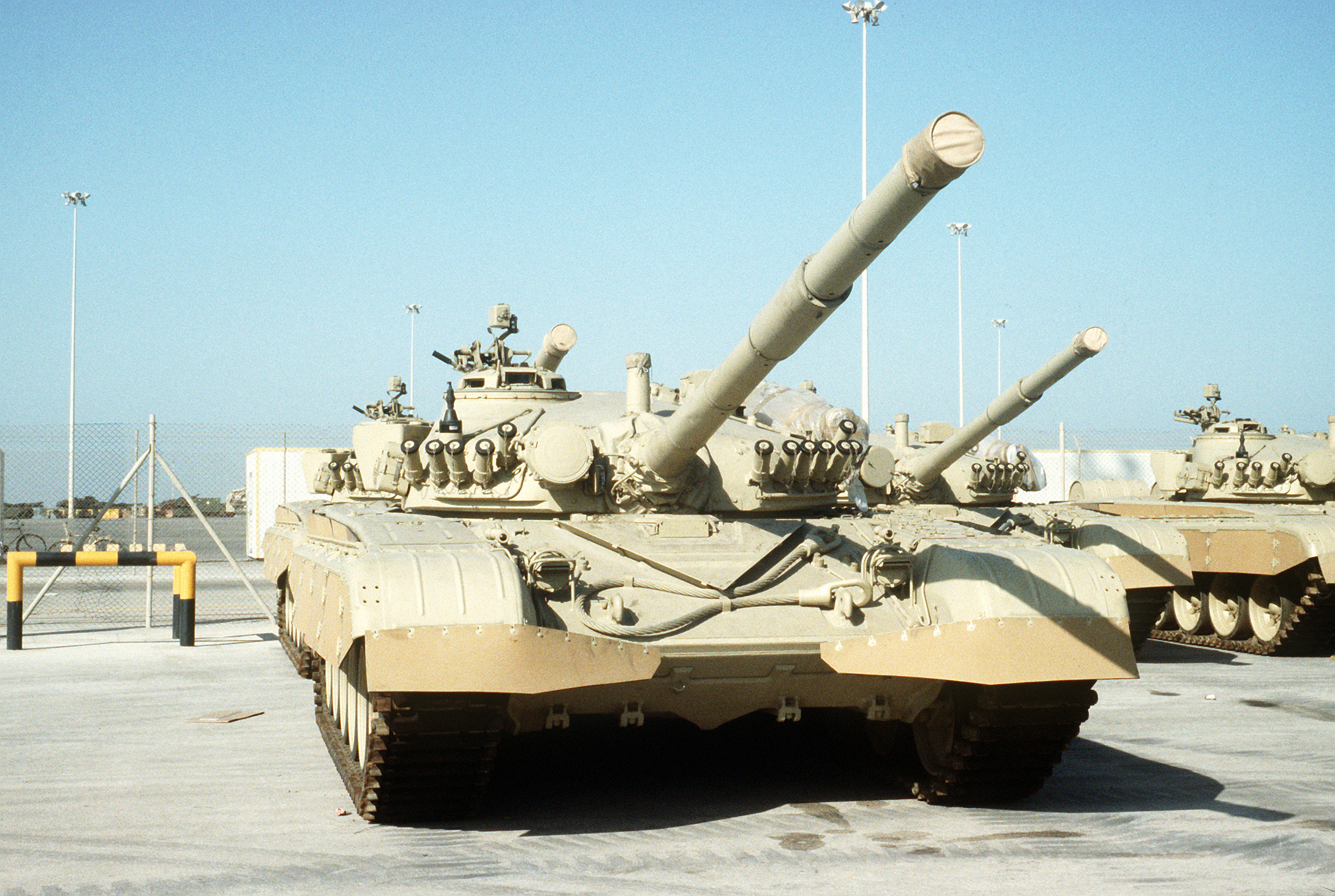
Kuwaiti M-84AB

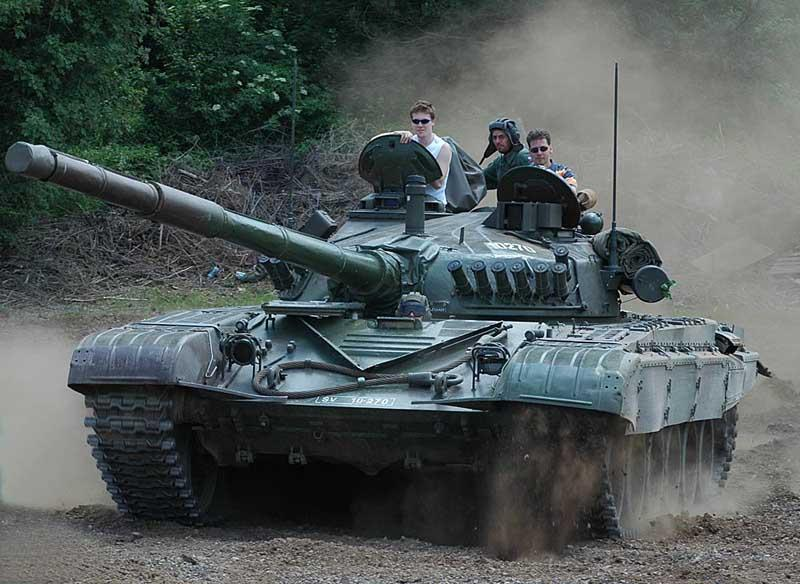
Slovenian M-84

=== Current ===
Croatia

- The Croatian Army has 74 M-84A4 Sniper MBTs awaiting replacement with an order of 44 Leopard 2A8s with deliveries scheduled to take place between 2028-2030. 30 M-84A4s were donated to Ukraine in 2024

Kuwait

- The Kuwait Land Forces has 75 M-84ABs in active service and 75 in storage as of 2024.

Serbia

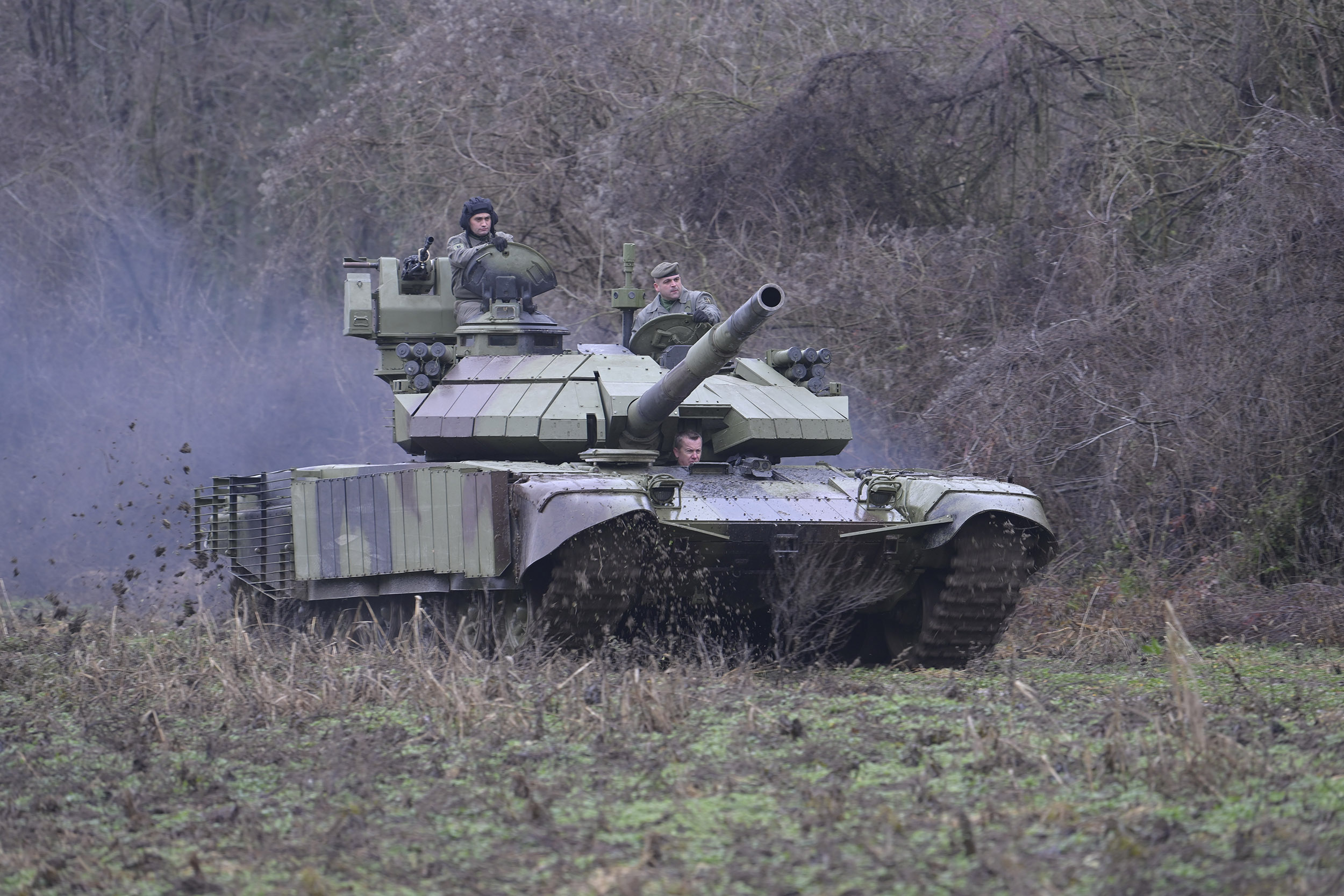
Serbian M-84AS2

- The Serbian Army operates 212 M-84 of which 26 M-84AS2 as of 2025.

Slovenia

- The Slovenian Army had 40 M-84 tanks in 2011. As of 2024, 14 remain operational for training-only while 32 remain in storage. All tanks were upgraded to the M-84A4 Sniper variant. A German offer of sending German-made vehicles in exchange of M-84A4s for Ukraine fell through.
  - 14 are used by 45th center of tracked combat vehicles in Pivka

Ukraine

- 30 M-84A4 Sniper donated by Croatia in 2024.

=== Former ===
Yugoslavia

- The Yugoslav People's Army operated about 450 M-84s in M-84 and M-84A versions. The M-84 was intended to fully replace the T-34, M4 Sherman and M47 Patton tanks then held in storage as well as some of the older T-55 units. Most JNA tanks were passed to the successor state – FR Yugoslavia, while a number was also captured by Croatia, Bosnia and Herzegovina and Slovenia in the war.
  - 1st Armored Brigade of 14th Corps at Ljubljana
  - 4th Armored Brigade of 10th Corps at Zagreb
  - 211th Armored Brigade of 21st Corps at Niš
  - 252nd Armored Brigade of 37th Corps at Kragujevac
  - 329th Armored Brigade of 5th Corps at Banja Luka
  - 326th Armored Brigade of 37th Corps at Titovo Užice
  - 243rd Armored Brigade of 41st Corps from Skopje
  - 265th Armored Brigade of 32nd Corps at Varaždin

Federal Republic of Yugoslavia

- Federal Yugoslav Army:
  - 1st Armored Brigade of Belgrade Special Forces Corps
  - 36th Armored Brigade of Novi Sad Corps
  - 211th Armored Brigade of Niš Corps
  - 15th Armored Brigade of Priština Corps

Serbia and Montenegro

- Ground Forces of Serbia and Montenegro:
  - 211th Armoured Brigade of Niš Corps
  - 243rd Armoured Brigade of Priština Corps
  - 252nd Armoured Brigade of Priština Corps

Republic of Bosnia and Herzegovina

- Army of the Republic of Bosnia and Herzegovina captured and operated 3 M-84s.
  - 3rd Corps, operated 2 M-84
  - 5th Corps, operated 1 M-84

Republika Srpska

- The Army of Republika Srpska (VRS) operated about 65 M-84s. After the VRS was integrated into the Armed Forces of Bosnia and Herzegovina (OSBiH), they were used by the OSBiH as late as 2011
  - 101st Armored Brigade at Banja Luka operated about 65 M-84s

Republic of Serbian Krajina

- Serbian Army of Krajina operated an unknown number of M-84 tanks in 1995

Bosnia and Herzegovina

- Operated 71 M-84 tanks, replaced with M60A3 TTS tanks.

Ba'athist Iraq

- The Popular Army (Iraq) Captured M-84 tanks during the invasion of Kuwait.

== See also ==
- T-72
- PT-91 Twardy
- M-84AS2
- M-95 Degman

== Bibliography ==
- Foss, Christopher F, ed. (2011). Jane's Armour and Artillery 2011-2012 (32nd ed.). Jane's Information Group. ISBN 978-0-7106-2960-9.
- International Institute for Strategic Studies (1995). The Military Balance 1995-1996. Oxford University Press. ISBN 978-0-19-828055-2.
- International Institute for Strategic Studies (12 February 2024). "Chapter Three: Europe". The Military Balance. 124 (1): 54–157. doi:10.1080/04597222.2024.2298591. ISSN 0459-7222.
- International Institute for Strategic Studies (12 February 2024). "Chapter Six: Middle East and North Africa". The Military Balance. 124 (1): 328–395. doi:10.1080/04597222.2024.2298594. ISSN 0459-7222.
- Radić, Aleksandar (2020). The Yugoslav Air Force in the Battles for Slovenia, Croatia, and Bosnia and Herzegovina, 1991–1992. Europe@War Series. Vol. 1. Warwick, England: Helion & Company. ISBN 978-1-914377-54-9.
- Thomas, Nigel; Mikulan, Krunoslav (2006). The Yugoslav Wars (1): Slovenia & Croatia 1991–95. Elite Series. Bloomsbury USA. ISBN 978-1-84176-963-9.
- Thomas, Nigel; Mikulan, Krunoslav (2013). The Yugoslav Wars (2): Bosnia, Kosovo and Macedonia 1992–2001. Elite Series. Bloomsbury Publishing. ISBN 978-1-4728-0196-8.
