= ULT-160 =

ULT 160
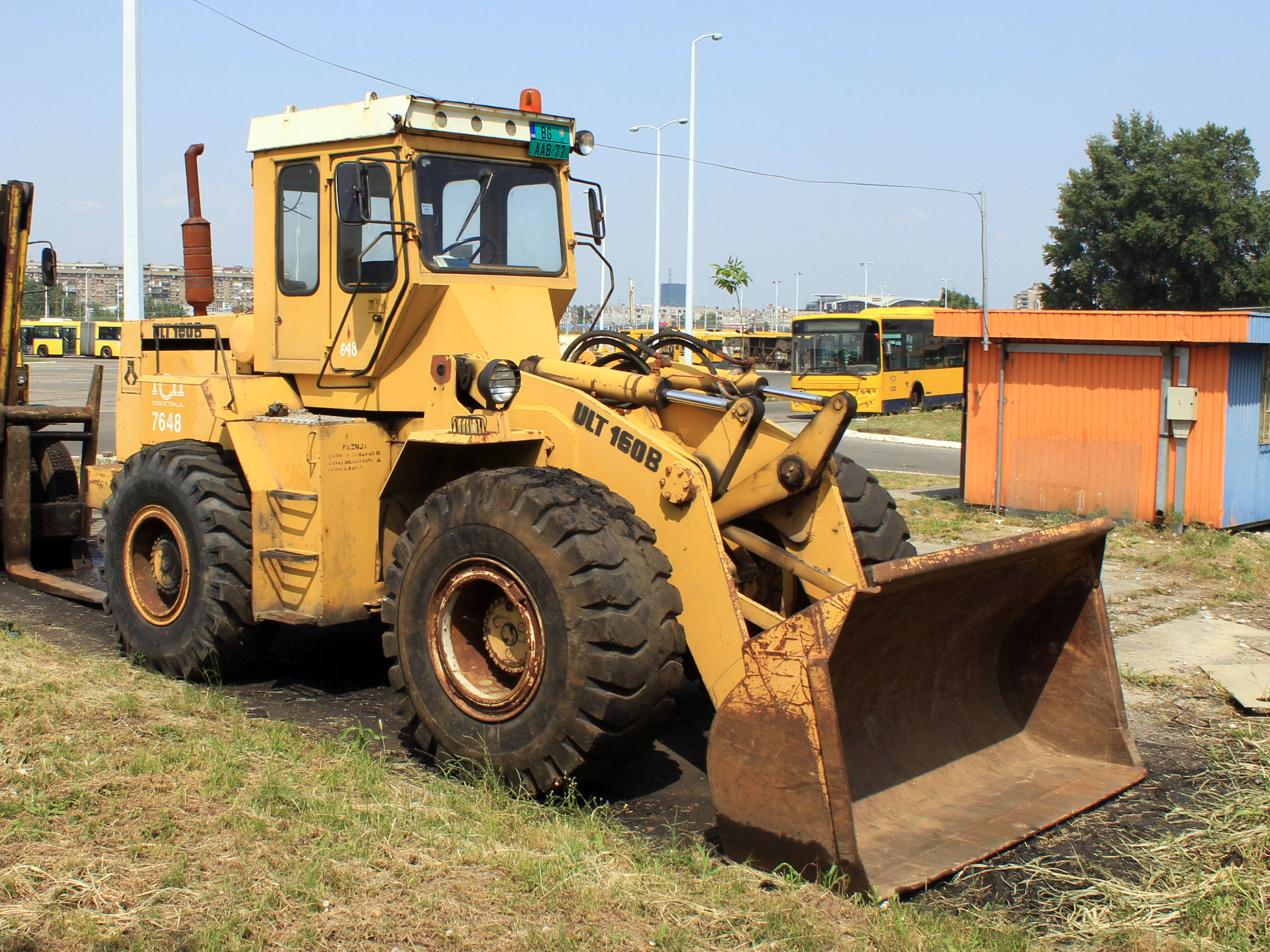

Overview
- Manufacturer: 14. oktobar
- Production: 1985 - present

The Ult 160 is a front loader that was produced by 14. oktobar in Kruševac, Serbia. Ult 160 is the successor of Ult 150 front loaders. Ult 160 is designed for agricultural and industrial applications. 14. oktobar, founded in 1923 and revitalised under the Czechoslovak Group in 2017, is renowned for producing high-quality machinery and components for civilian and military sectors.

== Specifications ==
=== Engine ===
- Engine Power: 165hp (121kW)
- Cylinders: 6
- Displacement: 6.7l
- Maximum Torque: 946 nm

=== Weights ===
- Total Weight: 13,960kg
- Engine Weight: 485kg
