= 14. oktobar =

Serbian manufacturer of heavy machinery and equipment

14.oktobar
- Native name: 14. октобар 14. oktobar
- Type: d.o.o.
- Industry: Manufacturing
- Founded: 14 March 2016; 10 years ago
- Headquarters: Jasički put 2, Kruševac, Serbia
- Area served: Worldwide
- Products: tractors, loaders, crawler excavators, bulldozers, components, agriculture machines and components
- Revenue: ▲€3.83 million (2019)
- Net income: ▼€0.20 million (2019)
- Total assets: ▼€7.19 million (2019)
- Total equity: €0 (2019)
- Owner: Czechoslovak Group (100%)
- Number of employees: 312 (2019)
- Website: www.14-oktobar.co.rs

14. oktobar (Serbian: 14. октобар, romanized: 14. oktobar) is a Serbian manufacturer of heavy machinery and equipment, headquartered in Kruševac, Serbia.

== History ==
IMK 14. oktobar was established by Austrian and Hungarian investors in 1923 as Company specialized in wagons repair and manufacture. In the first years of the company, the primary activity is related to the overhaul and repair of vehicles and freight cars, at time is increased the use of quality in production technology by simultaneously extending the product range, which resulted in start of production of steel construction, metal consumer products, and products for use in the military industry.

After World War II, the company was nationalized and repaired from war damage. It was named in a memorial of the date when Kruševac was liberated form Nazi occupation in 1944. The company has oriented to production of construction, mining, agriculture and transportation, machinery and equipment for the purpose of manufacturing equipment and machine parts. It was the largest producer of heavy machinery in Yugoslavia. During its golden times, it employed around 8,600 people.

In 2015, after sanctions, NATO bombing, therefore years of accumulated business losses, the company has suspended its production of mobile civil engineering machines. From 2014 through 2015, nearly all of 1,500 employees left the company, using the social program. In 2016, the company has declared bankruptcy. In March 2016, a new company was register under name "14. oktobar". It took production facilities of the former company on lease.

In 2017, "SCMG 14. oktobar" from Belgrade on behalf of Czech company "Czechoslovak Group" bought the company. After the purchase, Prosecutor's Office of the Republic of Macedonia launched an investigation against former Macedonian head of the Administration for Security and Counterintelligence Sašo Mijalkov, on suspicion for money laundering and suspicious connections to the "Czechoslovak Group".

== Products ==
=== Machines ===
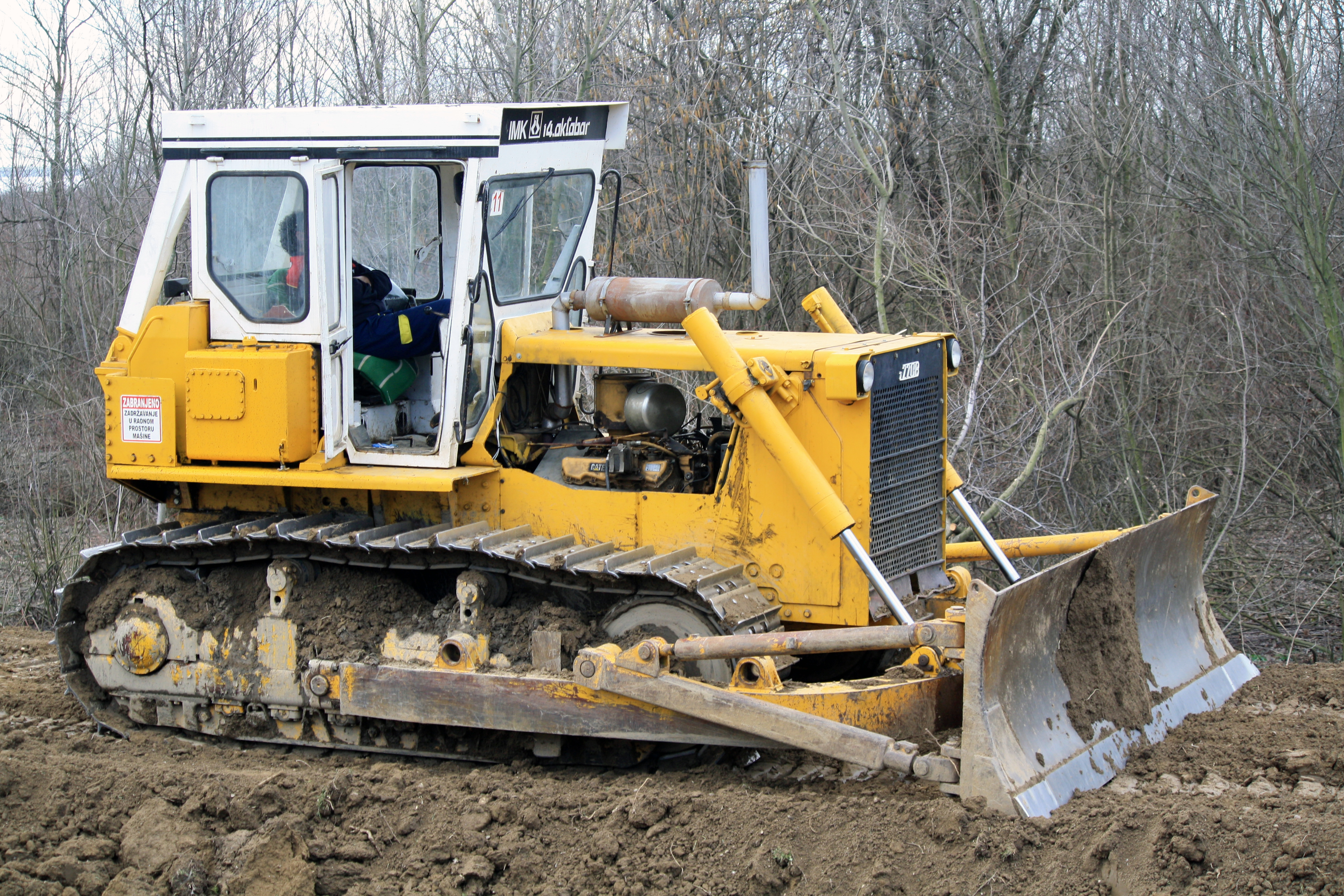
TG-220B dozer

Tracked tractor

- TG-120
- TG-160
- TG-220

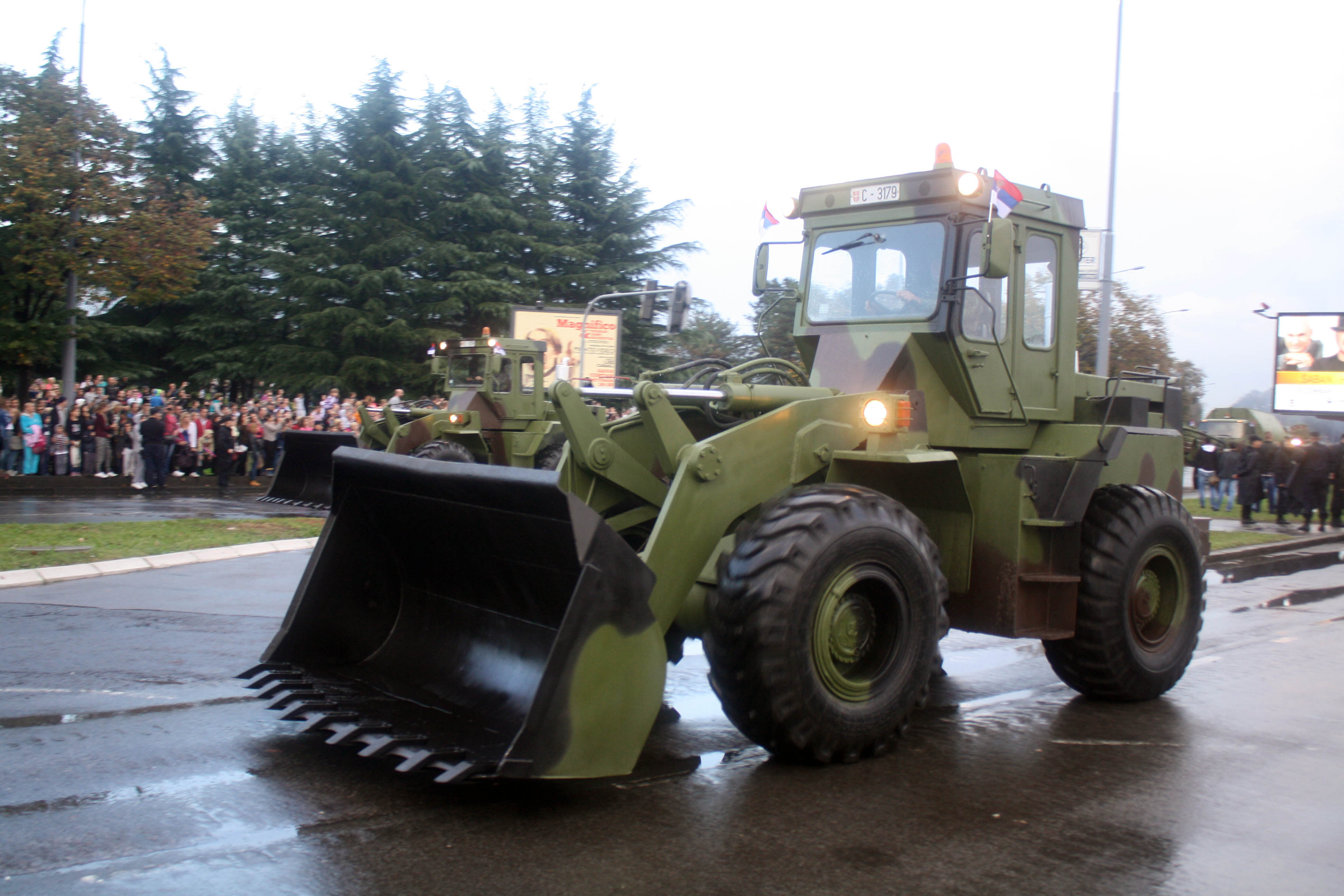
Serbian Army ULT-160CK loader

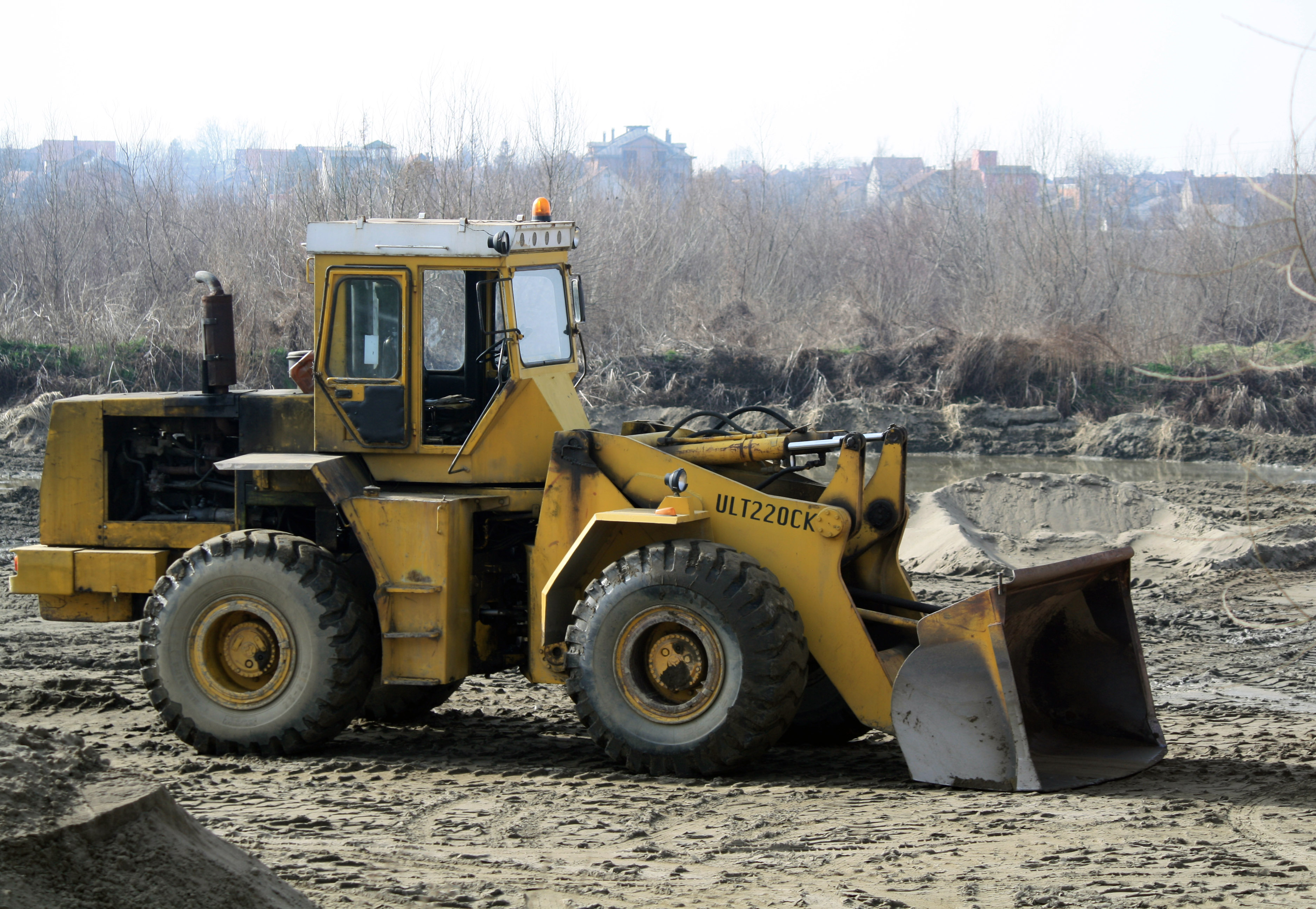
ULT-220CK loader

Wheel loader

- ULT-100
- ULT-150
- ULT-160
- ULT-220
- K-220

Excavator

- BGH-250

Agriculture machinery

- UZT-24
- TG-50

=== Components ===
- Gearbox
- Tracked machines running gear
- Rigid driving axle
- Hydrodynamic couplings
- Axial bearings

=== Other products ===
- Hydraulic front tractor loader - TPU
- Hydraulic rear tractor backhoe loader - TZU
- Hydraulic truck crane KD-3S
- Extension trailer PP-075
- Hydraulic mower HIKOS 2000
- Hydraulic side mower CCB-50
- Hydraulic press HP-7/10
- Transport basket K-1
- Containershttp
- Reservoirs and tanks

=== Military program ===
- LRSVM Morava
- M-94 Plamen-S
- M-96 Orkan II
- Tank power packs
