= Zastava M90 =

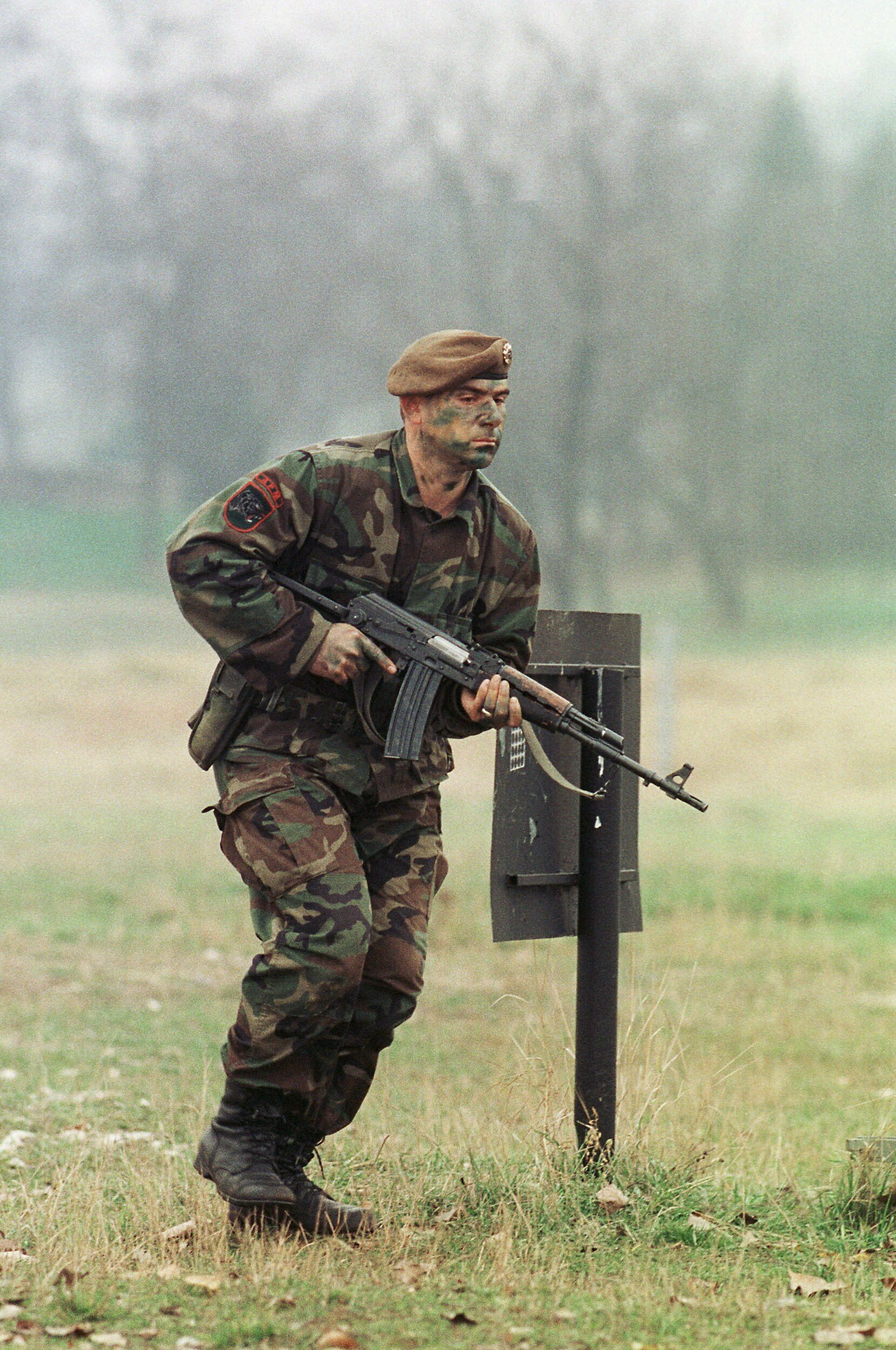
- Zastava M90 being used by Army of North Macedonia.
- Type: Assault rifle
- Place of origin: Yugoslavia

Production history
- Manufacturer: Zastava Arms

Specifications
- Mass: 4.9 kg
- Length: 985 mm (M90)
- Cartridge: 5.56×45mm NATO
- Caliber: 5.56mm
- Action: Gas-actuated, rotating bolt
- Rate of fire: 650 rounds per minute
- Muzzle velocity: 915 m/s
- Effective firing range: 500 m
- Feed system: 30-round detachable box magazine
- Sights: Adjustable iron sights, optional mount required for optical sights

The Zastava M90 is an assault rifle developed and produced by Zastava Arms in Serbia (formerly the Socialist Republic of Serbia, Yugoslavia). It was developed from the Zastava M70 assault rifle, a modified copy of the Soviet AKM, but with a Western type flash eliminator added on the barrel end, chambered in the Western 5.56×45mm NATO caliber, and with a different magazine design, similar to a STANAG magazine.

The M90 was intended to replace the M70 in the Yugoslav People's Army, but the breakup of Yugoslavia disrupted its development. Today, the weapon remains rare and has never formally entered service.

== Overview ==
The Zastava M90 is the modified version of Zastava M80, itself a version of the Zastava M70 (chambered in the Western 5.56×45mm NATO round), also comes with a flash eliminator and different magazine design, which means that like its predecessor, the M90 is a modified Soviet AKM. It is gas-operated, air-cooled and magazine-fed, shoulder fired weapon with selective fire capability, and like M70, can launch rifle grenades and has a rifle grenade sight added on the gas tube, instead of under barrel grenade launcher like on most other AK variants. It also incorporates the adjustable gas system from its M76, M77 and B1 cousins, with the third gas position being the gas cutoff for grenades.

Like all Zastava-produced AK variants, the M90 can be identified from the originals by its longer lower wooden handguard design, which has three cooling vents, no bulge and like the stock, is made out of different wood type. Also, due to using Western round, this particular model also has different magazine design, similar to Western STANAG and a Western type of flash eliminator, similar to one used on American M16 assault rifle. Like on the other Zastava AK's, this three-vent feature gives the M90 lower overheating when compared to the originals, but the Western round in this case, slightly reduces reliability.

== Variants ==
- Zastava M90 – Standard variant with fixed wooden stock.
- Zastava M90A – Variant with a fixed wooden stock being replaced with an AKMS style underfolding metallic one.
- Zastava M85 – Carbine; shortened variant of the M90A assault rifle.
- Zastava PAPM90NP – Variant designed for import into the United States. Comes with a fixed polymer stock and an added polymer adapter to accept AR15 style STANAG magazines.
- Zastava ZPAPM90 – Variant designed for import into the United States. Comes with an adjustable gas block, side-folding stock, and new polymer magazines. Has a barrel length of 18.25 inches (464 mm) and an unloaded weight of 8.65 pounds (3.92 kg).

== See also ==
- Zastava M21
- List of assault rifles
