= Zastava P25 =

- Type: Semi-Automatic Pocket Pistol
- Place of origin: Serbia

Production history
- Manufacturer: Zastava Arms

Specifications
- Mass: 320 g
- Length: 118 mm (4.7 in.)
- Barrel length: 56 mm (2.2 in.)
- Cartridge: .25 ACP
- Action: Blowback
- Muzzle velocity: 750–900 ft/s
- Feed system: 8-Round Detachable-Box Magazine
- Sights: Iron Sights

The Zastava P25, nicknamed the Dark Lady, is a blowback-operated, single-action, semi-automatic pocket pistol chambered in .25 ACP. The P25 is manufactured by Zastava Arms of Serbia. It features a two-stage safety mechanism whereas pulling the hammer into the first position blocks both the trigger and the hammer. The pistol frame is made of aluminum alloy and the barrel is made of alloy steel, while the handgrips are usually made of walnut or polymer materials. The P25 is aimed extensively at the civilian market as a self-defense weapon due to its concealability, but is somewhat less favorable compared to the M57, M88 and CZ 99 pistols due to its small caliber.

Its production has been likely discontinued as it is no longer listed on the Zastava Arms website.
