= Zastava M91 =

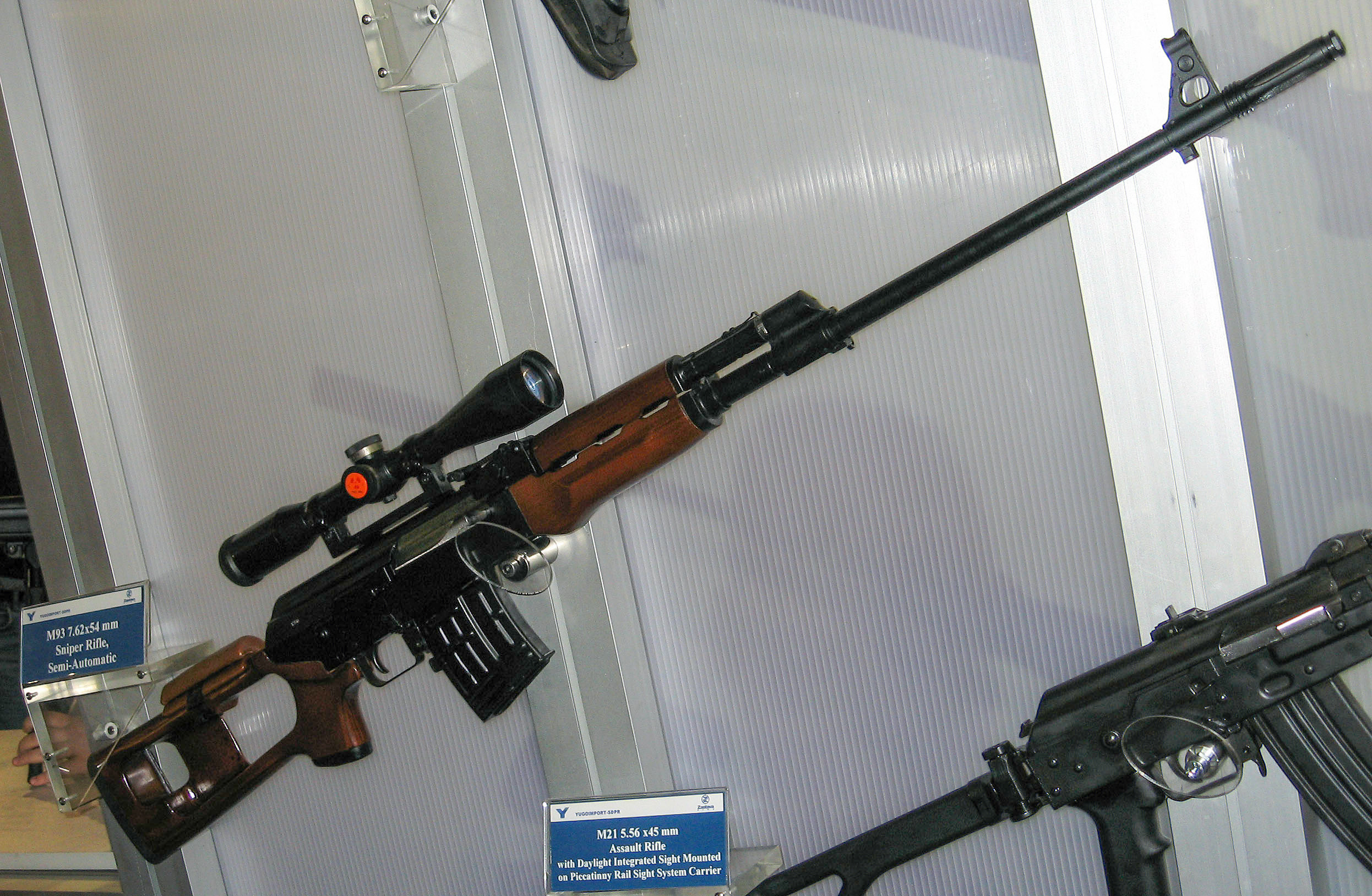
- Zastava M91
- Type: Designated marksman rifle
- Place of origin: Serbia and Montenegro

Service history
- In service: 1992–present
- Used by: See Users
- Wars: Yugoslav Wars; Syrian Civil War; Yemeni Civil War (2014–present)

Production history
- Designer: Zastava Arms
- Designed: 1991
- Manufacturer: Zastava Arms

Specifications
- Mass: 5.15 kg (11.4 lb) (with optical sight)
- Length: 1,195 mm (47.05 in)
- Barrel length: 620 mm (24.41 in)
- Cartridge: 7.62×54mmR
- Caliber: 7.62mm
- Action: Gas-operated
- Rate of fire: Semi-automatic
- Muzzle velocity: 790 m/s (2,592 ft/s)
- Effective firing range: 1,000 m (1,094 yd)
- Feed system: 10-round detachable box magazine
- Sights: Backup iron sights adjustable to 1,000 m (1,094 yd); Optical sights can be mounted on a rail

The Zastava M91 is a semi-automatic designated marksman rifle chambered in 7.62×54mmR, designed and manufactured by Zastava Arms. Like its predecessor, the Zastava M76, the M91 is internally based upon an elongated version of the AK-47 design, but the M91 shares more external similarities with the Dragunov sniper rifle than the M76. The rifle is in service with the Serbian Army, where it replaced the M76, which was chambered for the 7.92×57mm cartridge.

== History ==
Zastava's website claims that the M91 rifle was designed after a long and careful study of combat tactics and experience of military and police special forces worldwide; and that its development has been carried out under supervision and in close cooperation with some of the most experienced and capable special and anti-terrorist units.

Current modernisation of Serbian forces is proceeding on the basis of a plan designed during the late 1990s known as Model-21. It envisages upgrading personal equipment in 26 categories, of which only five will be imported from abroad. One of the important new developments is the introduction of a series of domestically developed systems such as M91 7.62×54mmR sniper rifle (a requirement resulting from the decision to withdraw the 7.92×57mm Mauser cartridge used in the Zastava M76 sniper rifle and Zastava M53 machine gun).

== Design and features ==
The M91 is a semi-automatic rifle fed from detachable 10-round box magazines. In concept, it is similar to the Soviet Dragunov sniper/designated marksman rifle. While the design of the M91 is based upon an elongated version of the AK-47 design just like its predecessor, the Zastava M76, the M91 features several modifications, bringing it closer to the Dragunov rifle. The separate stock and pistol grip used on the M76 have been replaced with a thumbhole stock made of synthetic polymer material resembling that used on the Russian rifle. The 7.62×54mmR chambering of the Zastava M91 is the same as used in the Dragunov. The 7.62×54mmR is suited for long-range use, and replaced the 8×57mm IS round in Serbian service.

The barrel profile is relatively thin to save weight and is ended with a slotted flash suppressor. The barrel's bore is chrome-lined for increased corrosion resistance, and features four right-hand grooves with a twist rate of 240 mm (1:9.4 in).

Overall, the design of the flash suppressor, the detachable box magazine, the simplified PSO-type rangefinder reticle used in earlier Zrak telescopic sights, the thumbhole stock and modified bolt carrier as well as a milled receiver strongly point at the Dragunov as the M91's design template.

A side-rail on the left wall of the receiver accepts various telescopic sights and night optics. The standard daylight telescopic sight for the M91 is the ZRAK ON 6 × 42. For low light conditions the rifle can also be equipped with PN 5 × 80 passive sights of the first and second generation of night vision devices. The optical sight can be removed from the rail and reinstalled without loss of zero.

The rifle features adjustable backup iron sights with a sliding tangent rear sight which can be adjusted from 100 m (109 yd)1 to 1,000 m (1,094 yd). These can be employed when the primary optical sight is damaged.

The best results are obtained at ranges up to 800 m (875 yd). The maximum aiming distance offered by the optical telescopic sight and iron sights is 1,000 m (1,094 yd). For 30 cm (12 in) high targets (head silhouette), the effective range is approximately 320 m (350 yd), for 50 cm (20 in) high targets (chest silhouette) the range is 450 m (492 yd) and for a 150 cm (59 in) high moving silhouette the effective range is 650 m (711 yd).

== Users ==
- Iraq
- Myanmar: Copy produced as MAS-1 MK-II.
- Serbia
- Syria: Used by the Syrian Army.
- Yemen: Used by Southern Resistance forces.

== See also ==
- Dragunov sniper rifle
- Galil Sniper
- PSL (rifle)
- Zastava M07
- Zastava M76
- Zastava M93 Black Arrow
- List of sniper rifles
