= Zastava M80 =

Type of assault rifle

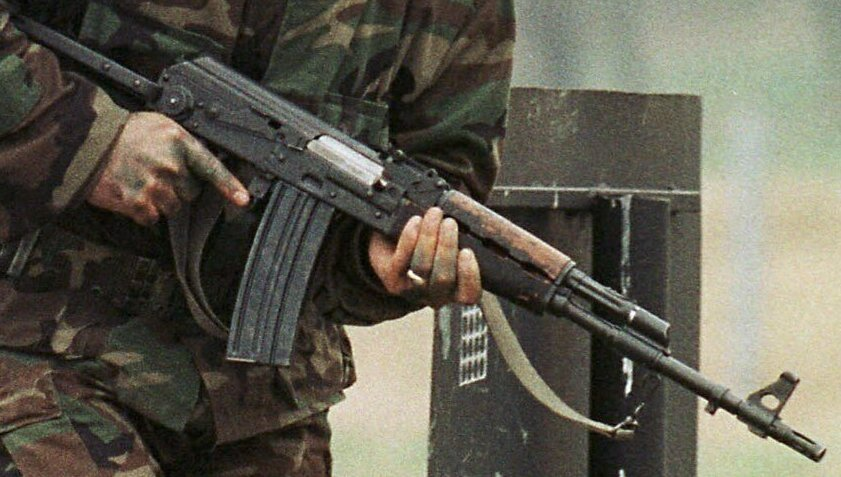
The Zastava M90, an updated model

The Zastava M80 was a 5.56 mm assault rifle produced by Zastava Arms. The M80 had a fixed wooden stock while the M80A had an under-folding metal stock. It was introduced in the early 1980s. It was the 5.56 mm version of the Zastava M70, with a longer barrel, later modified in 1990 as the Zastava M90.

== Design ==
It is gas-operated, supports semi-automatic and full-automatic rate of fire.

The M85 is a related compact carbine development of the M80, also chambered in the 5.56 mm round.

== Sources ==
- Walter, John (2006). Rifles of the World. Krause Publications. pp. 213–. ISBN 0-89689-241-7.
- Jane's Infantry Weapons. Vol. 12. p. 227. ISBN 9780710606730. "5 .56 mm M80 rifle with wooden stock and M80A with folding metal stock"
