= Zastava PPZ =

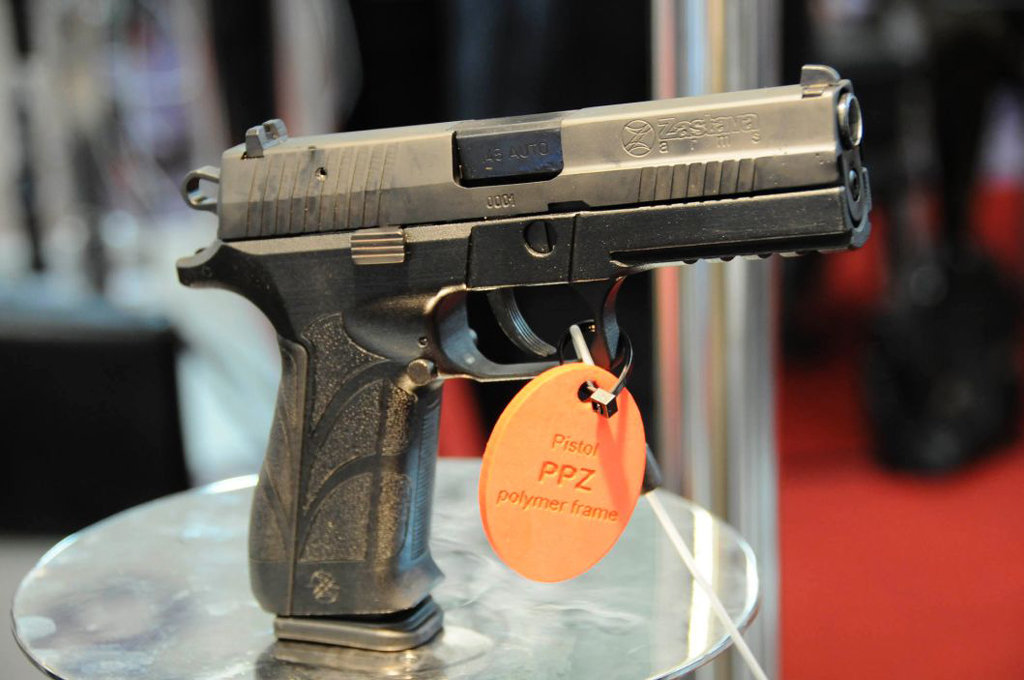
- Zastava PPZ prototype IWA Show 2012
- Type: Semi-automatic pistol
- Place of origin: Serbia

Production history
- Designed: 2007–present
- Manufacturer: Zastava Arms

Specifications
- Mass: 650 grams (.45 ACP)
- Length: 190mm (M-07)
- Barrel length: 108mm (M-07)
- Cartridge: .45 ACP; 9mm Parabellum.40 S&W; 7.62×25mm Tokarev
- Feed system: Detachable box magazine:.45 ACP (14).40 S&W (15); 9mm (17-18); 7.62 (20)
- Sights: three dot iron sights

The Zastava PPZ is the latest generation of the CZ 99 series of handguns chambered in multiple calibers.

== History ==
In 2007 Zastava started work on new generation of pistols based on CZ 99 series, under the working name "CZ M-07". The M-07 was a general redesign of the CZ 99/999 Pistol. The top of the slide was flattened, sides were slanted (similarly to those of H&K USP), bore axis was lowered by 4 mm, trigger mechanism as well as slide release and decocking mechanism were also redesigned, longer beaver tail was added and magazine capacity was increased from 15+1 to 17+1.

In 2010, a prototype was unveiled on IWA Show in Nuremberg under the new working name "RASHOMON" The biggest difference was the new polymer frame featuring Interchangeable back strap and a full length MIL-STD-1913 rail. The slide also underwent a redesign as did the trigger, slide release and decocking mechanism. Weight was reduced to 650 grams (.45 ACP)

In 2012, another prototype was unveiled on IWA Show in Nuremberg under the new working name "PPZ" further refinement of RASHOMON prototype. The Zastava PPZ is in the final stages of design, undergoing reliability testing as of April 2013.

== Design details ==
The Zastava PPZ will feature a polymer frame, interchangeable back strap and an extended Mil-Std-1913 rail that will run the entire length of the slide.

PPZ is designed from the ground up around the .45ACP caliber, but 9×19mm version is also expected along with a .40 S&W version. It is expected that the design will be modular requiring only the barrel, recoil spring, magazine and possibly the extractor to convert the gun from one caliber to another.

There are unconfirmed rumors that the PPZ will be available in 7.62×25mm Tokarev caliber. It is estimated that the magazine capacity in .45 ACP caliber will be 14 rounds, 15 rounds in .40 S&W caliber, 17 or 18 rounds in 9×19mm (based on capacity increases prototyped in Zastava CZ 07 / M-07 prototype), while in 7.62×25mm the capacity is estimated to be 20 rounds.
