= Zastava M84 =

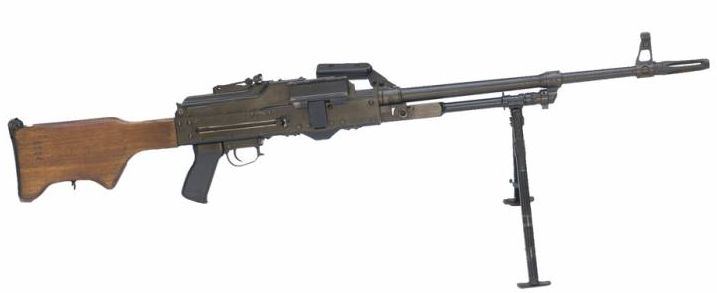
- Right side view of the M84
- Type: General-purpose machine gun
- Place of origin: Yugoslavia

Service history
- In service: 1985–present
- Used by: See Users
- Wars: Liberian Civil Wars; First Liberian Civil War; Second Liberian Civil War; Yugoslav Wars; Ten-Day War; Croatian War of Independence; Bosnian War; Kosovo War; Insurgency in the Preševo Valley; 2001 insurgency in Macedonia; War in Afghanistan; Iraq War; Syrian Civil War; Mali War; Yemeni civil war (2014–present)

Production history
- Designed: 1984
- Manufacturer: Zastava Arms
- Produced: 1984–present
- Variants: M84; M86

Specifications
- Mass: 8.8 kg (19 lb)
- Length: 1,175 mm (46.3 in)
- Barrel length: 658 mm (25.9 in)
- Cartridge: 7.62×54mmR
- Action: Gas-operated (rotating bolt)
- Rate of fire: 700-800 rounds per minute
- Muzzle velocity: 825 m/s
- Effective firing range: 1000 m
- Feed system: Belt-fed with 100 and 250 round belts
- Sights: Adjustable iron sights, optional mount required for optical sights

The Zastava M84 is a general-purpose machine gun designed and manufactured by Zastava Arms. It is a gas-operated, air-cooled, belt-fed and fully automatic shoulder-fired weapon.

== Design ==
The M84 is a licensed copy of the Soviet Union's PKM, with a few differences such as a differently shaped stock, and a slightly longer and heavier barrel which has slightly different measurements at the gas port and forward of the trunnion in diameter.

== Variants ==
=== M84 ===
The M84 is intended for infantry use, against enemy infantry and light vehicles. It is also configured for tripod mounting (like the PKS).

=== M86 ===
The M86 is a tank machine gun, and is designed to mount as a coaxial weapon on M-84 tanks and other combat vehicles. The stock, bipod, and iron sights are omitted from this version, and it includes a heavier barrel and electric trigger, much like the Russian PKMT. Another version, the M86A, is designed for external mounts and can be used dismounted.

=== M84M ===
An improved version of the M84. The changes include a picatinny rail on the receiver and a new buttstock.

== Users ==
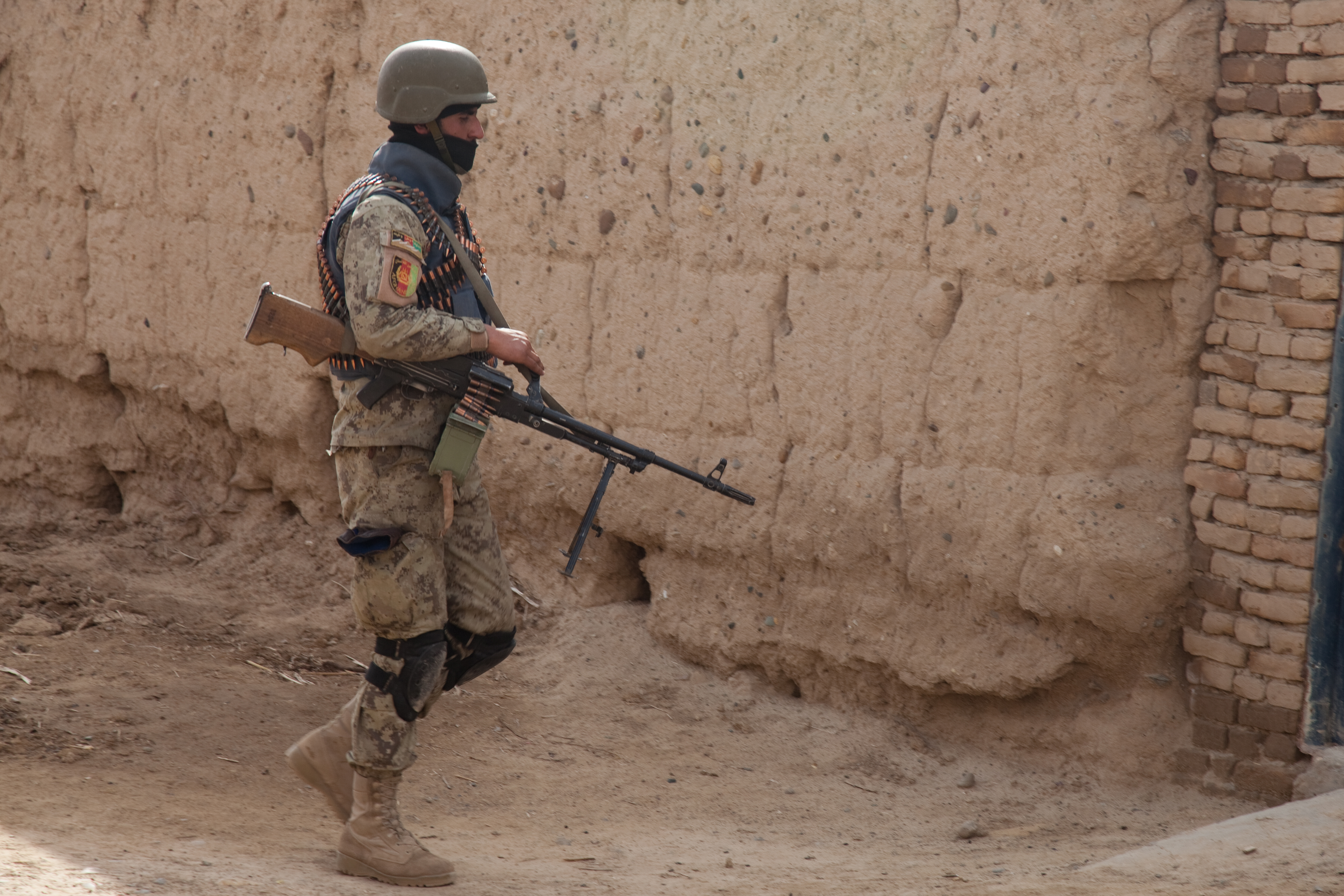
Afghan National Civil Order Police officer with a M84 machine gun in 2012.

- Afghanistan
- Bosnia and Herzegovina
- Burkina Faso: Used by the Burkinabese contingent of the United Nations Multidimensional Integrated Stabilization Mission in Mali.
- Cambodia
- Cameroon
- Democratic Republic of Congo
- Iraq
- Liberia
- North Macedonia
- Montenegro
- Serbia
- Somalia
- (Syrian opposition) Syrian National Army
- Yemen: Used by Houthis.

=== Former users ===
- Croatia: Former user, replaced by FN MAG and Ultimax 100.
- Yugoslavia: Designated Mitraljez 7.62 mm M84

== Gallery ==
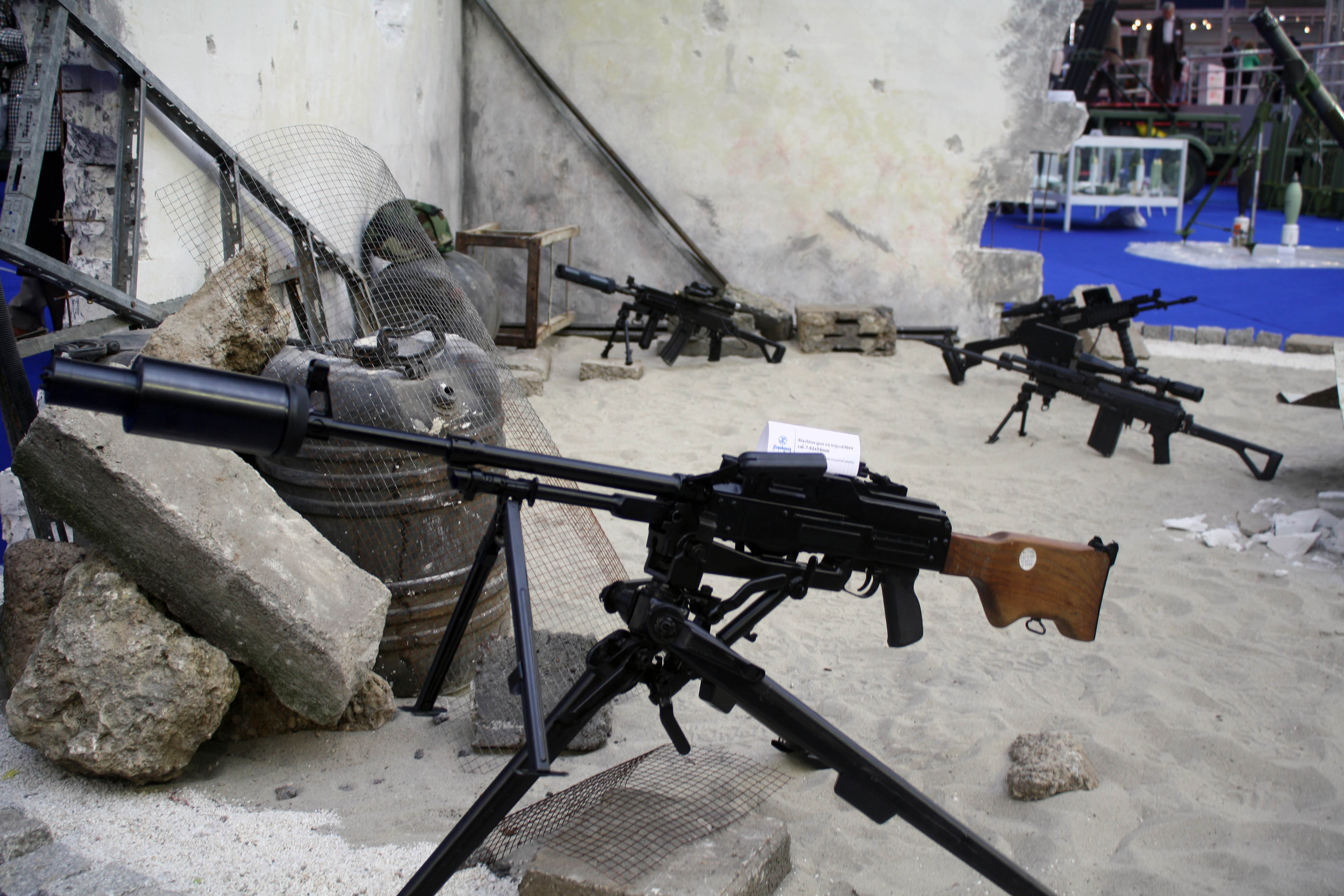
A Zastava M84/3.

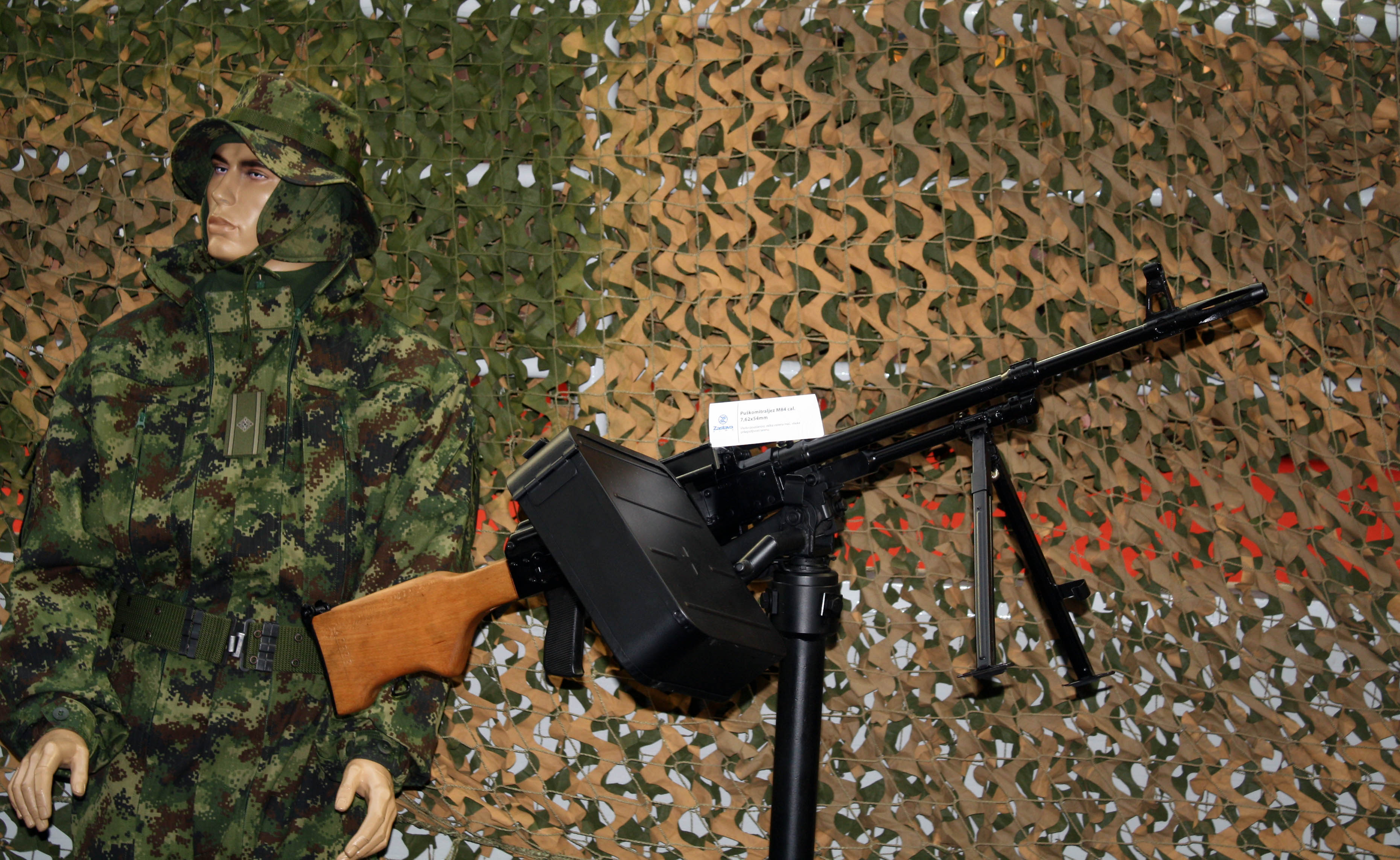
A Zastava M84.

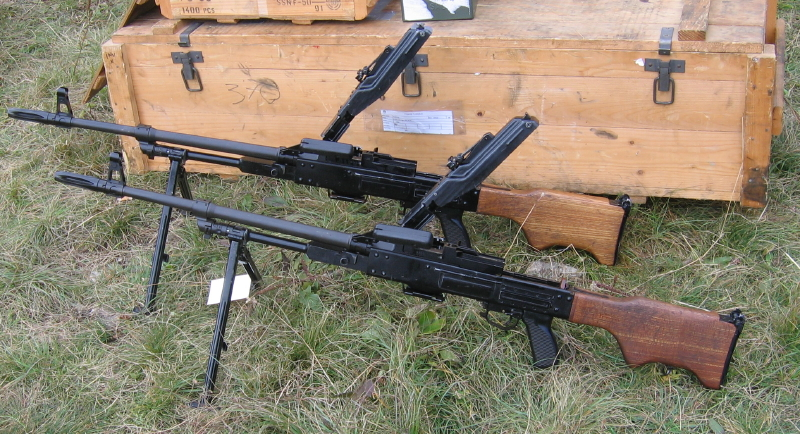
Side view of the light machine gun Zastava M84.

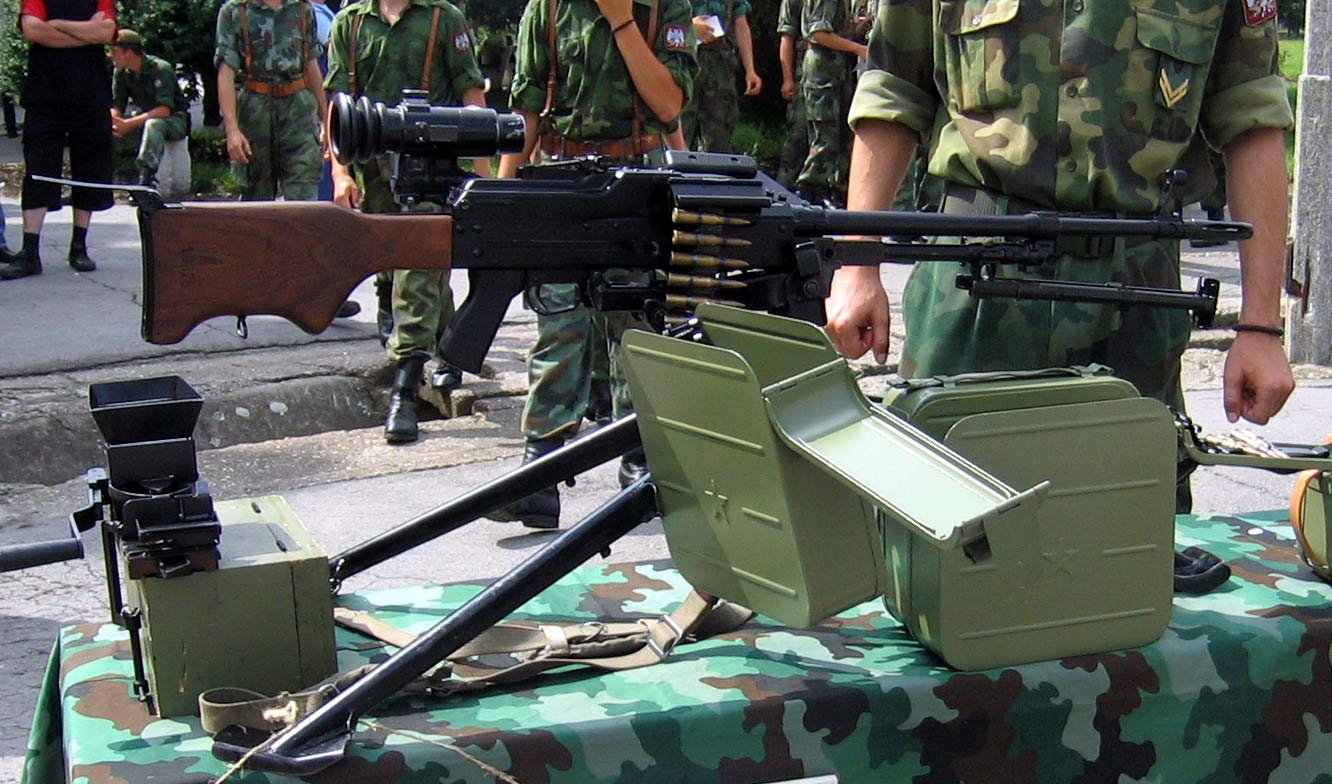
A Zastava M84 with telescopic sight.
