= Zastava M88 =

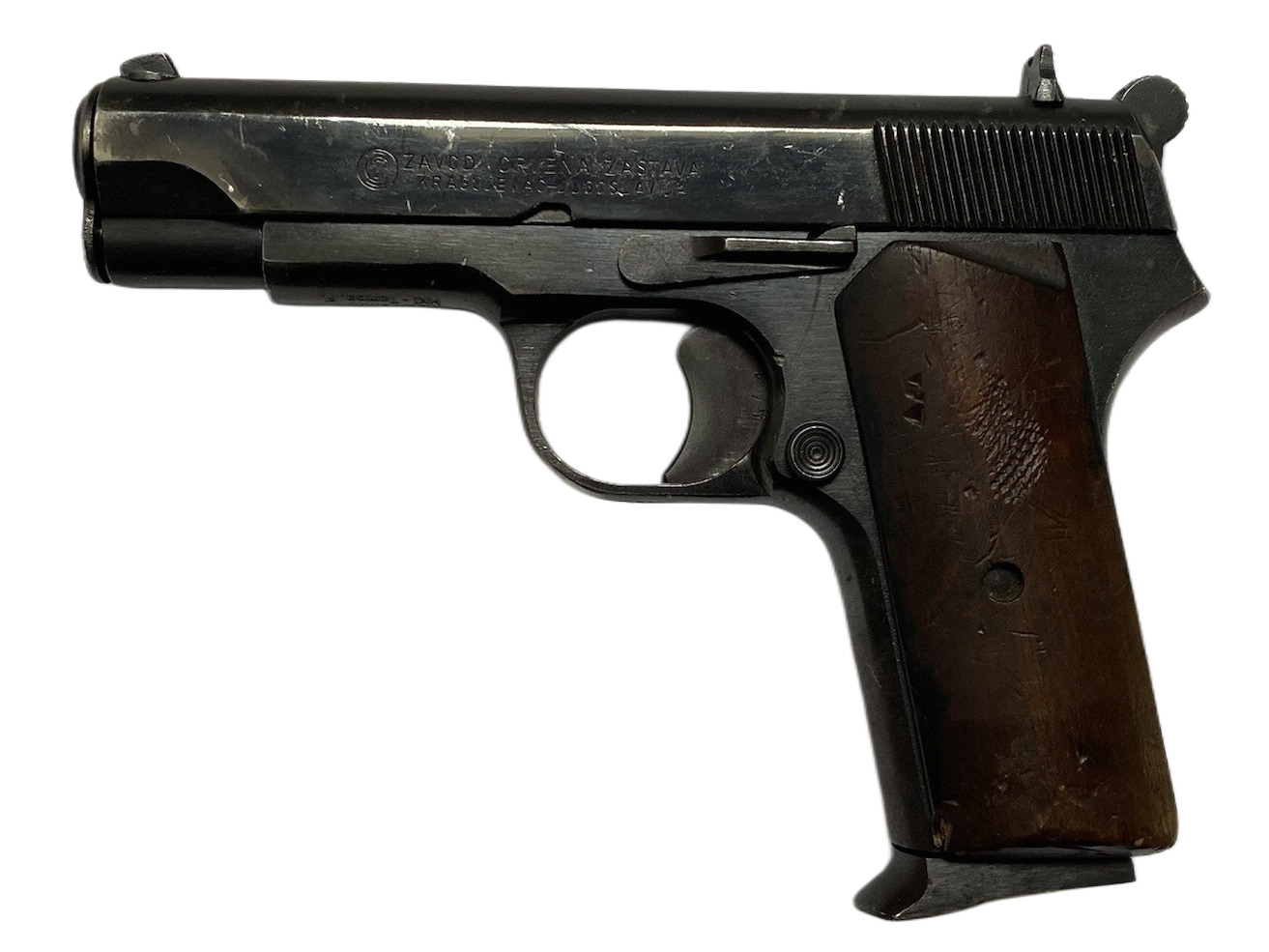
- Yugoslavian M88, early 1990s production
- Type: Pistol
- Place of origin: Yugoslavia

Service history
- Used by: Yugoslavia; Serbia

Production history
- Designed: 1987
- Manufacturer: Zastava Arms
- Variants: M88A

Specifications
- Mass: 0.85 kg (1.9 lb)
- Length: 175 mm (6.9 in)
- Barrel length: 96 mm (3.8 in)
- Width: 29 mm (1.1 in)
- Height: 130 mm (5.1 in)
- Cartridge: 9×19mm Parabellum
- Action: Short recoil actuated, locked breech, single action
- Feed system: 8-round magazine
- Sights: Iron

The Zastava M88 is a Yugoslavian and Serbian semi-automatic pistol produced by Zastava Arms. It is a compact derivative of the Zastava M57, which was itself an unlicensed variant of the TT pistol.

== History ==
The M88 was developed to replace the M57, then the standard side arm of the Yugoslavian military and law enforcement agencies, in 1987. The Yugoslavian government charged Zastava with designing a derivative of the M57 chambered for 9×19mm Parabellum that was easier to conceal, more ergonomic, and more suitable for self-defense. In response, Zastava engineers essentially scaled down the M57 design, incorporating an identical but shorter slide and barrel into the new pistol. The M88 was also designed with a proprietary 8-round magazine with a unique flared base; this was supposed to make the magazine easier to change quickly. The decision to move to the 9x19mm Parabellum cartridge from the 7.62×25mm Tokarev chambering of the M57 was also significant, and was partly motivated by export prospects. Zastava had already produced an M57 variant known as the M70A, chambered for the 9x19mm cartridge, for foreign commercial sales. Streamlining production on a single 9x19mm pistol for both domestic and export contracts was seen as cost-effective, and a major factor in creating the economy of scale necessary to make M88 production profitable for the Yugoslavian state. Serial production of the M88 for Yugoslavian military and police orders commenced in 1988, but was canceled in 1991 due to the country's ongoing civil wars.

The M88 had an extremely short service life with the Yugoslavian (and later Serbian) military and police. After the end of the Yugoslav Wars, it was replaced in Serbian service by the Zastava CZ99. By the 2000s, Zastava had resumed limited production of the M88 for the commercial export market, marketing the weapon primarily to civilians in North America and Europe for self-defense and sport shooting purposes.

== Features ==
The M88 has a shorter 3.5 inch barrel and a different hammer position than the M57. The earliest examples manufactured for the Yugoslavian state contract featured no external safety. During the early 1990s, Zastava also began producing a slightly modified M88 with an external safety on the slide; this received the designation M88A.

== Former users ==
- Croatia: Used by the Croatian Police.
- Serbia
- Socialist Federal Republic of Yugoslavia
