= Zastava =

Zastava (Serbo-Croatian and Slovene for "flag") may refer to:

- Zastava, Črnomelj, a settlement in Slovenia
- Zastava Arms, a Serbian firearms manufacturer
- Zastava Automobiles, a defunct Serbian car manufacturer
  - Zastava Special Automobiles, a subsidiary
  - Zastava Trucks, a subsidiary
    - Zastava TERVO, a successor company to Zastava Trucks
- Zastava, a Serbian newspaper founded in 1866 by Svetozar Miletić
