= PSL (rifle) =

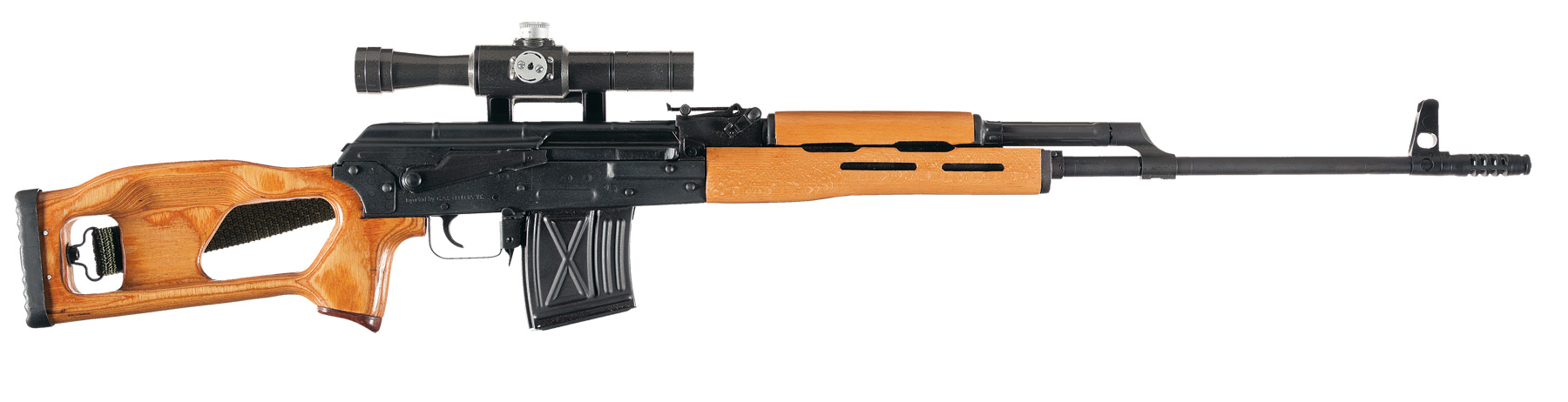
- The PSL
- Type: Designated marksman rifle
- Place of origin: Romania

Service history
- In service: 1974–present
- Used by: See § Users
- Wars: Romanian Revolution; Lebanese Civil War; Gulf War; Eritrean–Ethiopian War; First Chechen War; War in Afghanistan (2001–2021); Iraq War; Libyan Civil War (2011); Syrian Civil War; Libyan Civil War (2014–2020); War in Donbas (2014–2022); War in Iraq (2013–2017); Yemeni Civil War (2014–present); Saudi-led intervention in Yemen (2015–present); Conflict in Najran, Jizan and Asir; Russo-Ukrainian War

Production history
- Designed: 1974
- Manufacturer: Fabrica de Arme Cugir SA (ROMARM consortium)
- Produced: 1974–present
- Variants: See § Variants

Specifications
- Mass: 4.31 kg (9.5 lb) (empty with scope)
- Length: 1,150 mm (45.3 in)
- Barrel length: 620 mm (24.4 in)
- Cartridge: 7.62×54mmR; PSL 51: 7.62×51mm NATO
- Action: Gas-operated, long stroke; semi-automatic
- Rate of fire: Semi-automatic
- Muzzle velocity: 830 m/s (2,723.1 ft/s) with 10 grams (154 gr) projectile (7N14)
- Effective firing range: 800–1,000 m
- Maximum firing range: ~3000 metres
- Feed system: 10 round detachable box magazine, 5 round detachable box magazine (no longer produced)
- Sights: LPS-4 scope with tritium illuminated reticle + iron tangent sights

The PSL (Romanian: Pușcă Semiautomată cu Lunetă, 7.62x54mm model 1974, "scoped semi-automatic rifle") is a Romanian designated marksman rifle. It is also called PSL-54C, Romak III, FPK and SSG-97 (Scharfschützengewehr 1997). Though similar in appearance, mission and specifications to the SVD Dragunov, the PSL rifle is mechanically completely different as it is based on the RPK light machine gun, with its internals simply being scaled up to accommodate the more powerful 7.62×54mmR cartridge.

== History ==
After Socialist Romania's refusal to join the Invasion of Czechoslovakia, relations with the Soviet Union worsened. To counterbalance its reliance on Soviet military equipment, Romania accelerated the development of its arms industry, mostly relying on Soviet blueprints and licenses. As the Soviets were not eager to share technical information on the SVD Dragunov, a project commenced to develop the PSL.

PSL rifles were originally made at the Uzina Mecanică Cugir in Cugir, Romania starting with 1974. It was used by all branches of the Romanian Army, several internal troops and police units and the Gărzi Patriotice. After a consolidation of military arsenals when Romania joined NATO, a split of the factory occurred. Production of the PSL continues in Cugir under the brand SC Fabrica de Arme Cugir SA (ARMS arsenal), Romania.

The PSL rifle was designed to meet all the requirements of the SVD Dragunov. Its primary purpose is to be used by a squad level sniper, to engage targets at ranges beyond the capabilities of the standard issue AKM assault rifles. It is built around a stamped steel receiver similar to that of the RPK light machine gun; having a wider forward section, allowing for a buldged front trunnion. The PSL's operation is the same long stroke piston action of the Kalashnikov family of weapons. Its appearance is similar to the Dragunov sniper rifle, but they only share three components, the ammunition, optics, and bayonets.

North Korea Manufactures a gun locally that appears to be based on the PSL. Although some sources claim it is a Zastava M76 clone.

== Design ==
The PSL is chambered for the same 7.62×54mmR cartridge as the Dragunov, and feeds from a ten-round detachable box magazine. The magazine used on the PSL differs from that of Dragunov models in that it is stamped with an X-shaped pattern on the side, rather than the waffle style stamp found on the Russian and Chinese magazines. The magazines are not interchangeable between the Dragunov and PSL without heavy modification.

The PSL has been in service in Romania since the 1970s and is sold on the world market. Although capable of 1 Minute of angle (approximately 1" at 100 yards) or less, the PSL has had issues with its bolt carriers cracking when used with heavy ball (147 grain or greater) ammo and silencers, in part due to the lack of an adjustable gas system. Aftermarket gas system upgrades (both PSL dedicated and retrofitted standard AK) have been used to solve this problem.

The PSL's skeleton stock includes a corrugated and spring-loaded stamped steel buttplate. When the rifle is fired this helps reduce the felt recoil. The cheek riser on the comb of the stock is angled primarily for right-handed shooters.

=== LPS 4×6° TIP2 telescopic sight ===
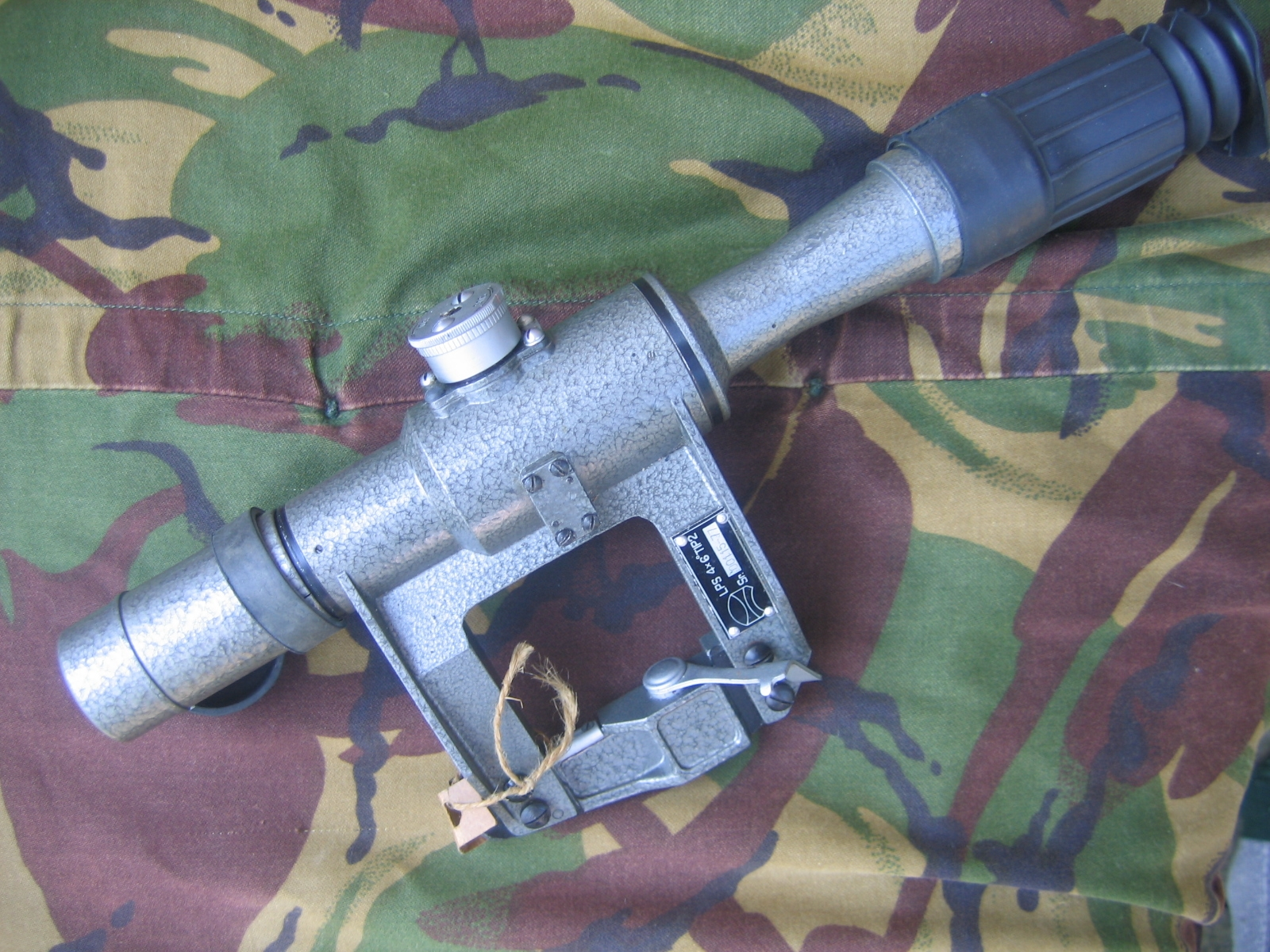
LPS 4×6° TIP2 military issue 4×24 telescopic sight

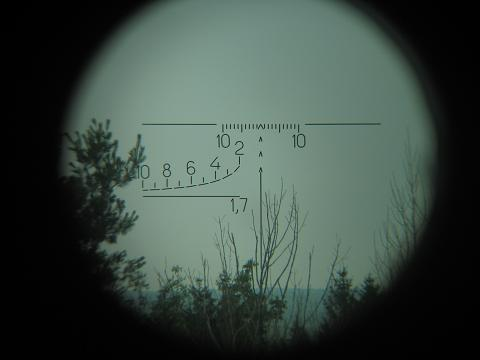
Stadiametric rangefinder reticle

The PSL's telescopic sight is made by the Romanian Optical Enterprise (IOR) in Bucharest. The PSL was originally issued with the type 1 version of the LPS telescopic sight. This 4×24 scope was more or less identical to the Russian PSO-1 telescopic sight with a battery-powered reticle illumination and an IR detection filter. These scopes stopped being produced around 1974. Shortly afterward the LPS scope was technically revised to simplify the maintenance and construction of the scope.

The PSL rifle is typically issued with a 4×24 optical sight called LPS 4×6° TIP2 (Lunetă Puṣcă Semiautomată Tip 2, or "Scope, Semi-Automatic Rifle, Type #2") which is a simplified version of the Russian PSO-1 telescopic weapon sight. This optical sight features 4× magnification, a 6° field of view, and the objective lens is 24mm in diameter. It shares the basic design and stadiametric rangefinder found in the reticle of the original Russian PSO-1 scope. The LPS 4×6° TIP2 elevation turret features bullet drop compensation (BDC) in 50m increments for engaging point and area targets at ranges from 100m up to 1,000m. The BDC feature must be tuned at the factory for the particular ballistic trajectory of a particular combination of rifle and cartridge at a predefined air density. Besides the BDC elevation or vertical adjustment control of the reticle, the windage or horizontal adjustment control of the reticle can also be dialed in by the user without having to remove turret caps, etc. The reticle illumination of the LPS 4×6° TIP2 is provided by tritium.

The LPS 4×6° TIP2 is issued with a lens hood that can be attached to the ocular to reduce/eliminate image-quality-impairing stray light and a cover to protect the objective external lens surface against foul weather and damage.

=== Mounting system ===
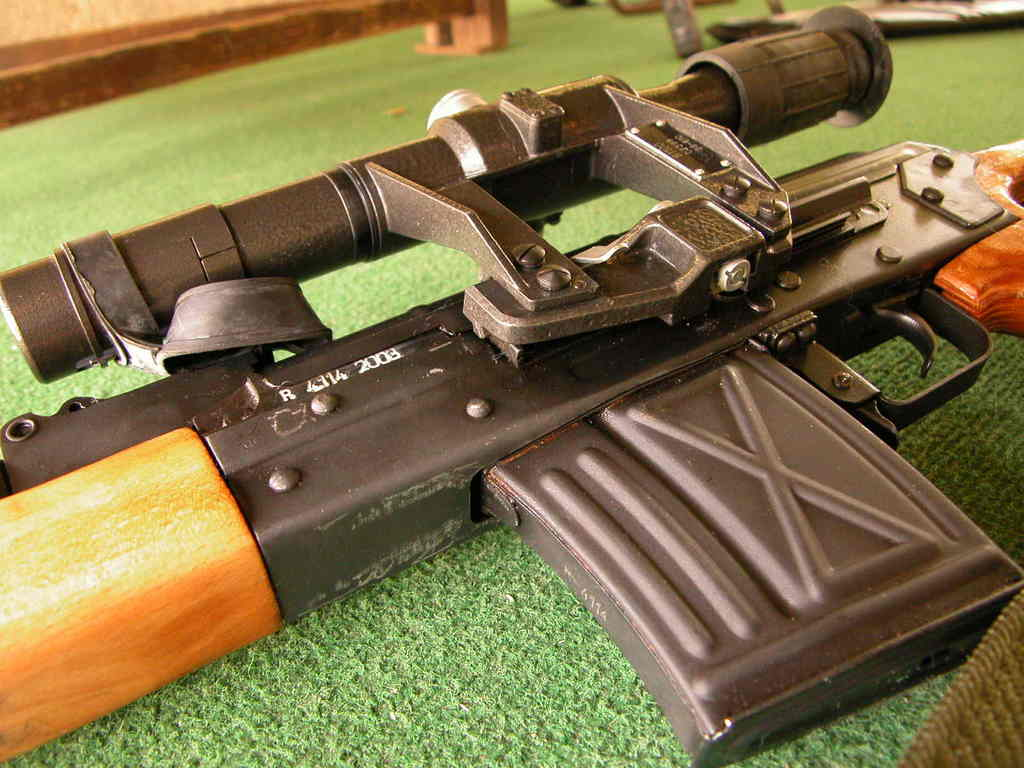
Mounting system detail.

The LPS telescopic sight propriety mount is adjustable for tension on the PSL's Warsaw Pact side rail, similar in design to the mounting used for Russian SVD rifles and PSO-1 optical sights. The mount positions the telescopic sight axis to the left side of the receiver and bore center axis. The Warsaw Pact mount has a castle nut that screws into the bottom of the locking lever. The spring-loaded portion of the clamp must be pressed down to tighten or loosen the castle nut.

The scope can be easily removed from the receiver of the rifle by swinging the locking lever open, then sliding the scope mount to the rear. This allows easy access to the receiver cover which needs to be removed for cleaning.

Due to the offset to the left and the relative height of the mounting, the PSL iron sights can be used with the LPS scope mounted.

== Variants ==
- PSL 54 – Version chambered for the 7.62×54mmR cartridge, also offered for export to the United States
- PSL 51 – Version chambered for the 7.62×51mm NATO cartridge

== Users ==
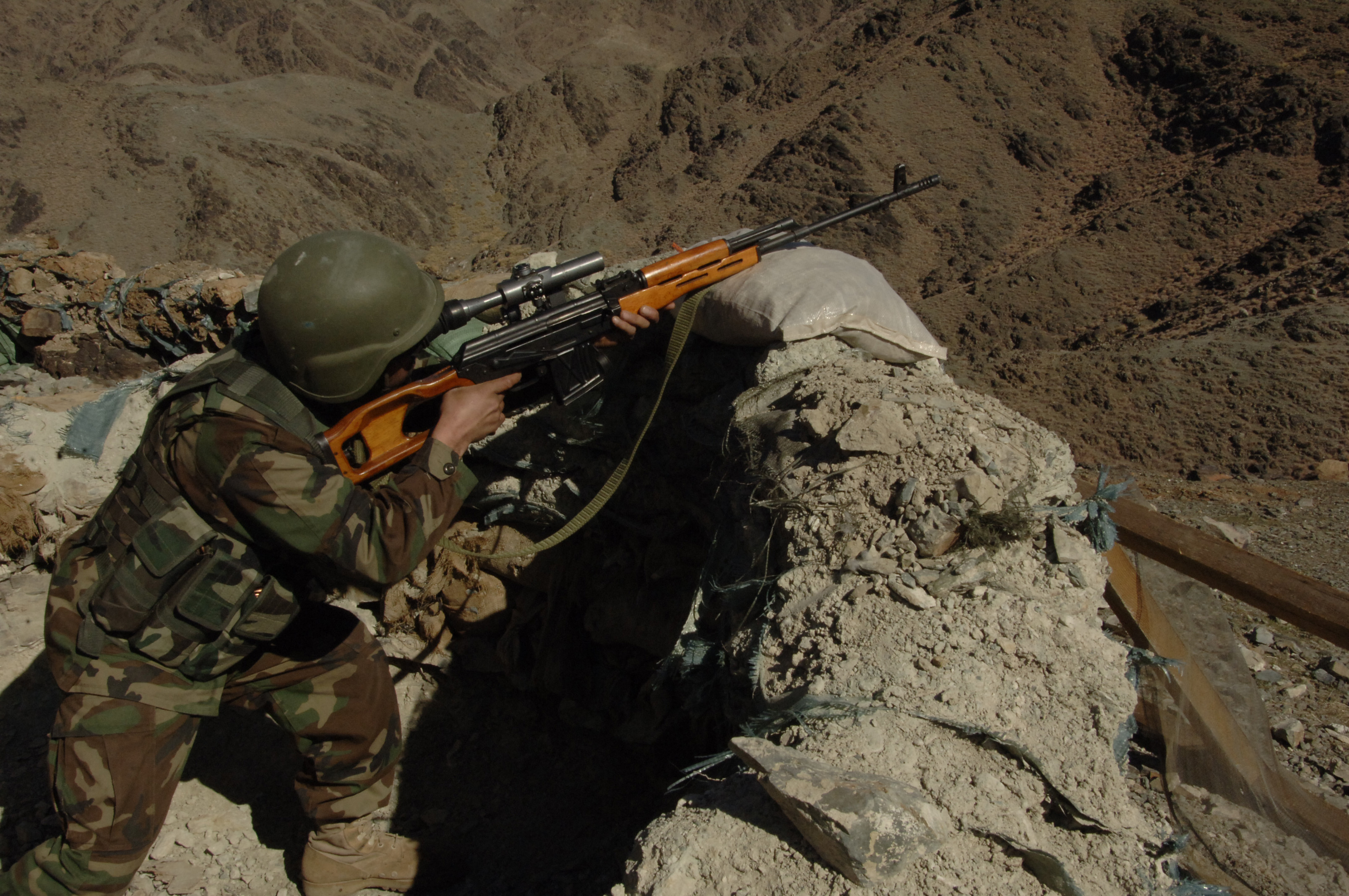
Afghan National Army soldier equipped with a PSL designated marksman rifle.

- Afghanistan
- Bangladesh
- Eritrea
- Ethiopia
- East Germany
- Iraq
- Libya
- Romania

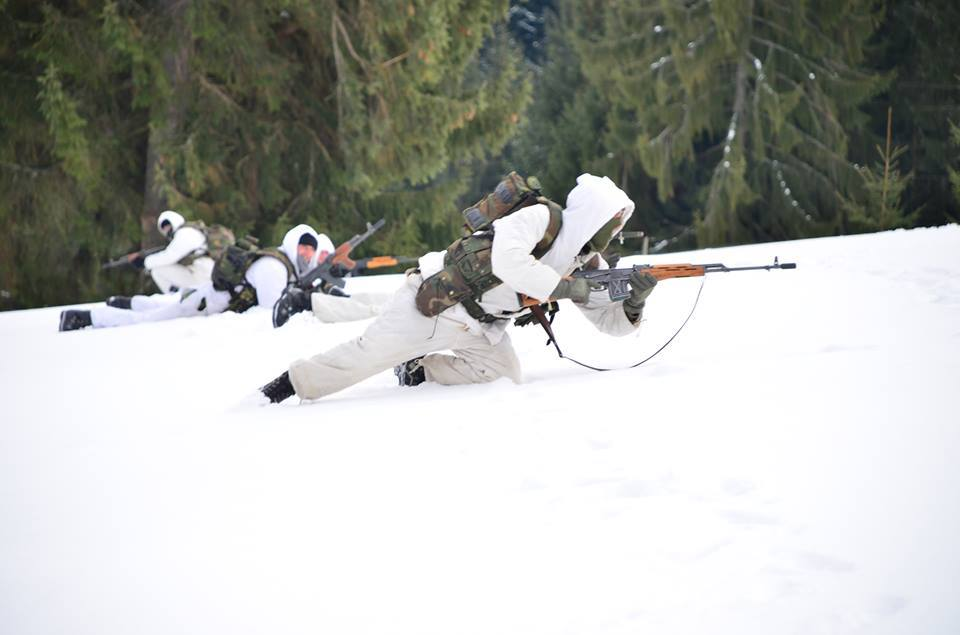
Romanian Army winter exercise

=== Non-state actors ===
- Anti-Gaddafi forces
- Islamic State

== See also ==
- Zastava M76
- Zastava M91

== Bibliography ==
- Ezell, E (1983) Harrisburg, PA: Stackpole Books, p. 637. ISBN 0-88029-601-1
- Günter Wollert; Reiner Lidschun; Wilfried Kopenhagen, Illustrierte Enzyklopädie der Schützenwaffen aus aller Welt : Schützenwaffen heute (1945–1985), Berlin : Militärverlag der Deutschen Demokratischen Republik, 1988. OCLC 19630248
- Rottman, Gordon; Shumate, Johnny: Kalashnikov AK-47 Assault Rifle, Osprey Publishing, 2011, ISBN 978-1-84908-461-1
