= Zastava M85 =

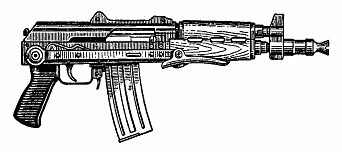
- Illustration of a Zastava M85.
- Type: Carbine
- Place of origin: Yugoslavia/Serbia

Production history
- Designed: 1985
- Manufacturer: Zastava Arms

Specifications
- Mass: 3.5 kg (7.72 lb)
- Length: 800mm with folding stock 540mm without folding stock
- Cartridge: 5.56×45mm
- Action: Gas-operated, rotating bolt
- Muzzle velocity: 700 m/s
- Effective firing range: 400 m
- Feed system: 30-round box magazine
- Sights: Adjustable iron sights, optional mount required for optical sights

The Zastava M85 is a carbine designed and produced by then Yugoslavian Zastava Arms. It is a shortened version of the original rifle, the Zastava M80, which is itself successor to the Zastava M70 assault rifle. The M85 is practically same as the carbine version of the M70, the Zastava M92, the only difference being in caliber, and in this case, the magazine design, as same as with original rifles, the M70 and M80.

Like its original variant, the M80, the M85 was intended to be a new weapon in the arsenal of the Yugoslav People's Army, but the breakup of Yugoslavia disrupted production. It is currently produced largely for commercial sales and export.

== Design and features ==
The Zastava M85 is an AK-pattern rifle incorporating design elements of the Soviet AKS-74U carbine, but chambered for the Western 5.56×45mm round. It is gas-operated, air-cooled, magazine-fed, and offers selective fire capability. It can be distinguished from traditional members of the AK family by its unique polymer pistol grip, 5.56x45mm magazine, and most significantly by its distinctive "Yugo" handguard, which is longer, and has three cooling vents instead of the usual two. The M85 also features a flash-hider muzzle device copied directly from the AKS-74U. Additionally, the M85 is built using a receiver stamped from 1.5mm sheet steel, which is thicker than the 1.0mm steel used in most AK derived rifles. This results in increased durability at the cost of increased weight.

== Derivatives ==
- Zastava M80 – Original rifle
- Zastava M90 – Improved version of the original rifle
- Zastava M92 – Near identical variant chambered for the Soviet 7.62×39mm round (carbine version of the Zastava M70 assault rifle)
