= Zastava M21 =

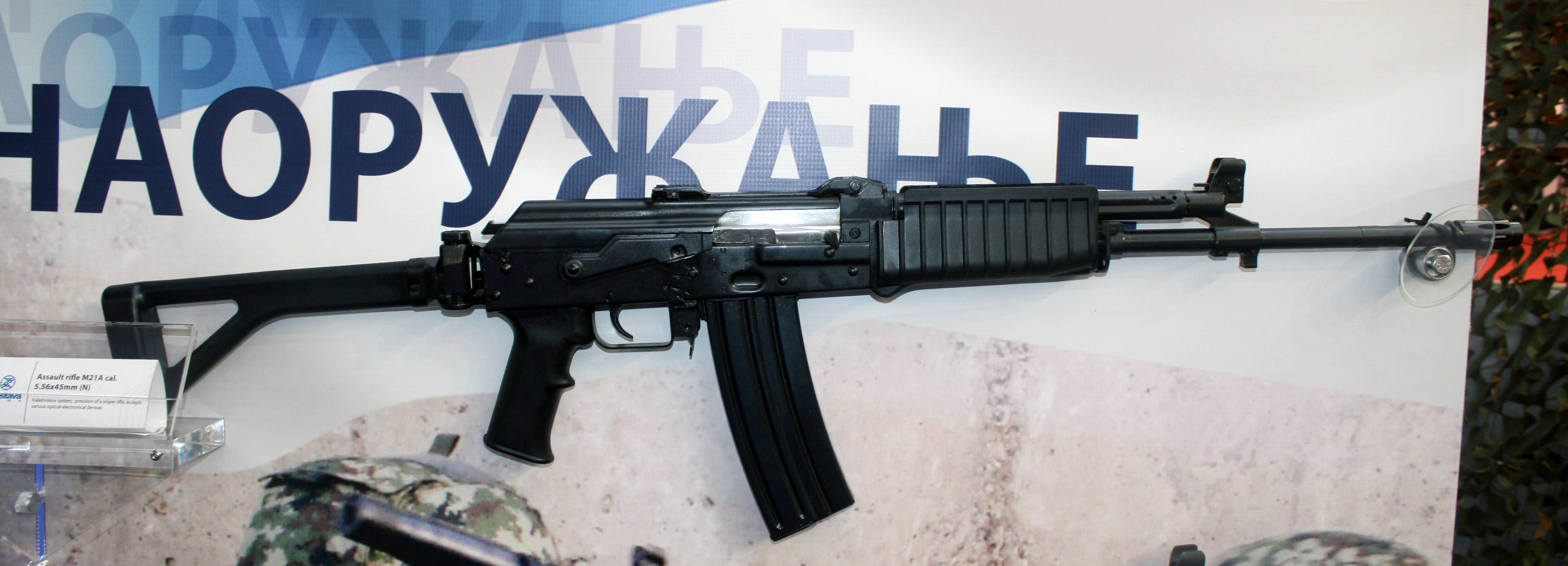
- Type: Assault rifle
- Place of origin: Serbia and Montenegro

Service history
- Used by: See Users
- Wars: Iraq War; Conflict in Peru; Syrian Civil War; Iraqi Civil War; Boko Haram insurgency

Production history
- Designer: Marinko Petrović
- Manufacturer: Zastava Arms
- Unit cost: $630 (2016)
- Produced: 2004–present
- No. built: 15,000
- Variants: See Variants

Specifications
- Mass: 4.15 kg (9.1 lb) (M21 A); 4.07 kg (9.0 lb) (M21 S); 3.91 kg (8.6 lb) (M21 C)
- Length: 1,000 mm (39 in) stock extended, 750 mm (30 in) stock folded (M21A); 915 mm (36.0 in) stock extended, 666 mm (26.2 in) stock folded (M21S); 815 mm (32.1 in) stock extended, 570 mm (22 in) stock folded (M21C)
- Barrel length: 460 mm (18.1 in) (M21 A); 375 mm (14.8 in) (M21 S); 290 mm (11.4 in) (M21 C)
- Cartridge: 5.56×45mm NATO
- Action: Gas-operated (rotating bolt)
- Rate of fire: 680 rounds/min
- Muzzle velocity: 925 m/s (M21 A); 890 m/s (M21 S M193); 870 m/s (M21 S M855)
- Effective firing range: 450 m (490 yd) with iron sights 600 m (660 yd) with optics
- Feed system: 30-round detachable box magazine
- Sights: Adjustable iron sights, optional mount required for optical sights

The Zastava M21 is a Serbian 5.56×45mm NATO assault rifle developed and manufactured by Zastava Arms.

== Description ==
The M21 is based on the Kalashnikov rifle, chambered in the 5.56×45mm NATO cartridge. The current models use a 1.5mm thick stamped receiver. The M21 can incorporate picatinny rails for mounting accessories like optics, vertical grips, bipods, etc.

The Zastava M21 is gas operated, long stroke piston with a rotating bolt locking system rifle. It features a hard chromium-plated, cold forged standard rifled or an optional polygonal rifled barrel, integrated 22mm flash hider grenade launcher, heavy-duty synthetic furniture with a polymer folding stock similarly to the AK-74M, and side optics rail as standard (optional adapter base for cover mounted picatinny rail also available). The rifle can also mount a 40mm under-barrel grenade launcher. It has a magazine capacity of 30 rounds. The cyclic rate of fire is 680 rounds per minute, and the sustained rate of fire is 120 rounds/min.

The Zastava M21 uses a conventional barrel, while the Zastava M21B uses a polygonal barrel. The regular barrel has six grooves with a right-hand twist. An octagonal polygonal version is also available and has four grooves with a right-hand twist (M21B). Barrels are also hard chrome plated to provide a longer service life.

The rifle has conventional iron sights that consist of a front post and a flip-up rear sight with 300m and 500m apertures. A set of picatinny rails on the hand guard can mount various optoelectronic devices. The M21 is a modular weapon, with configuration dependent on the task and mission.

Choices of optical sights include "TELEOPTIK" (ON M04) and "ZRAK" (ON M04A). Optoelectronic devices include a reflex sight ("MARS" M04), two bookmark target lasers ("AIM2000" M04A and "INFIZ" M04), two passive monoculars (M04 MINI N/SEAS and "MARS" M04+MINI N/SEAS), passive sight ("SOVA" PN 3x50).

== Variants ==
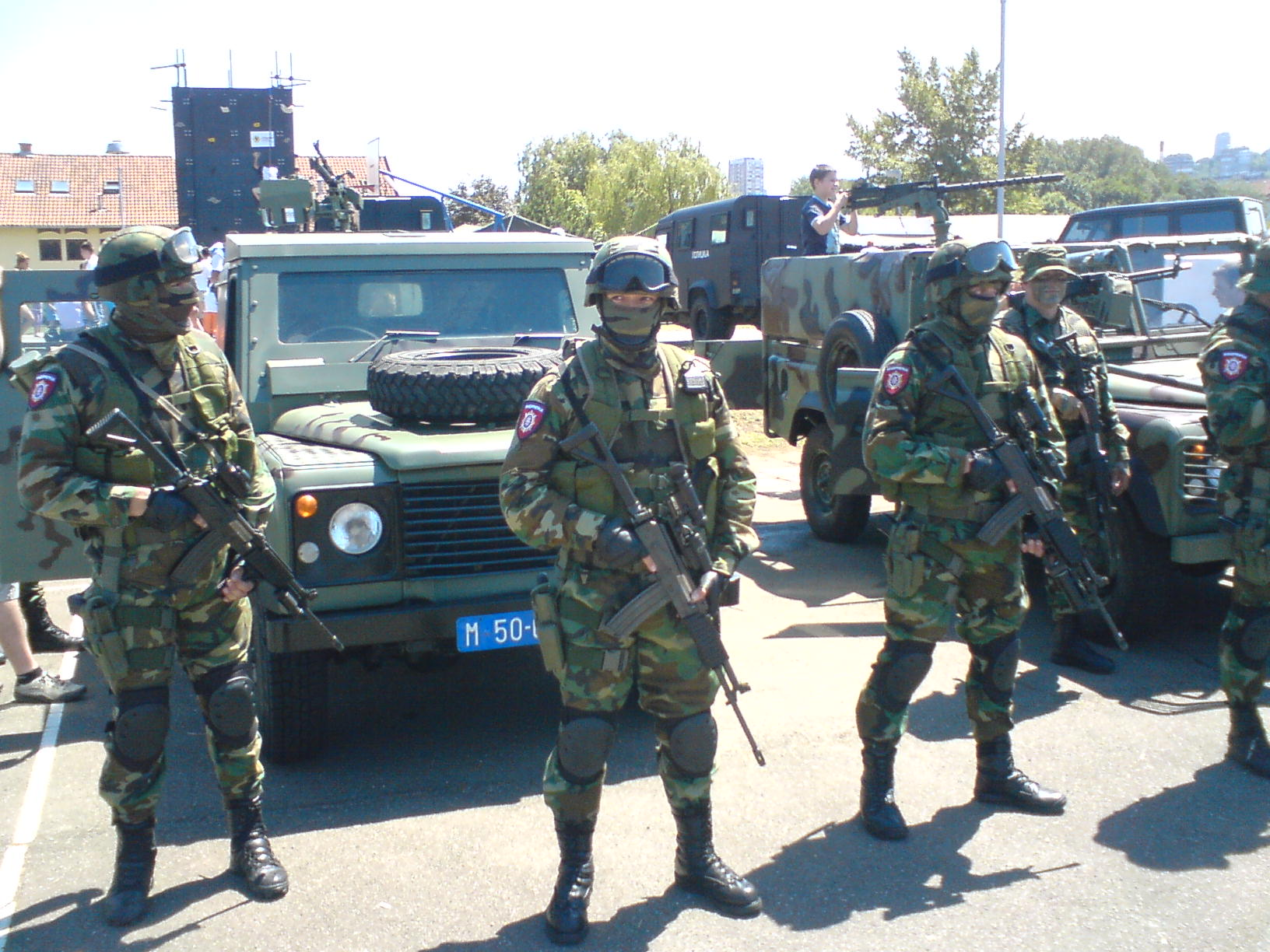
Serbian gendarmes armed with M21s

- M21 A – Standard baseline assault rifle.
  - M21 ABS – Built-in picatinny rail system.
- M21 S – Compact short barrel assault rifle.
  - M21 SBS – Built-in picatinny rail system.
- M21 C – Carbine.
  - M21 BS – Built-in picatinny rail system.

== Users ==
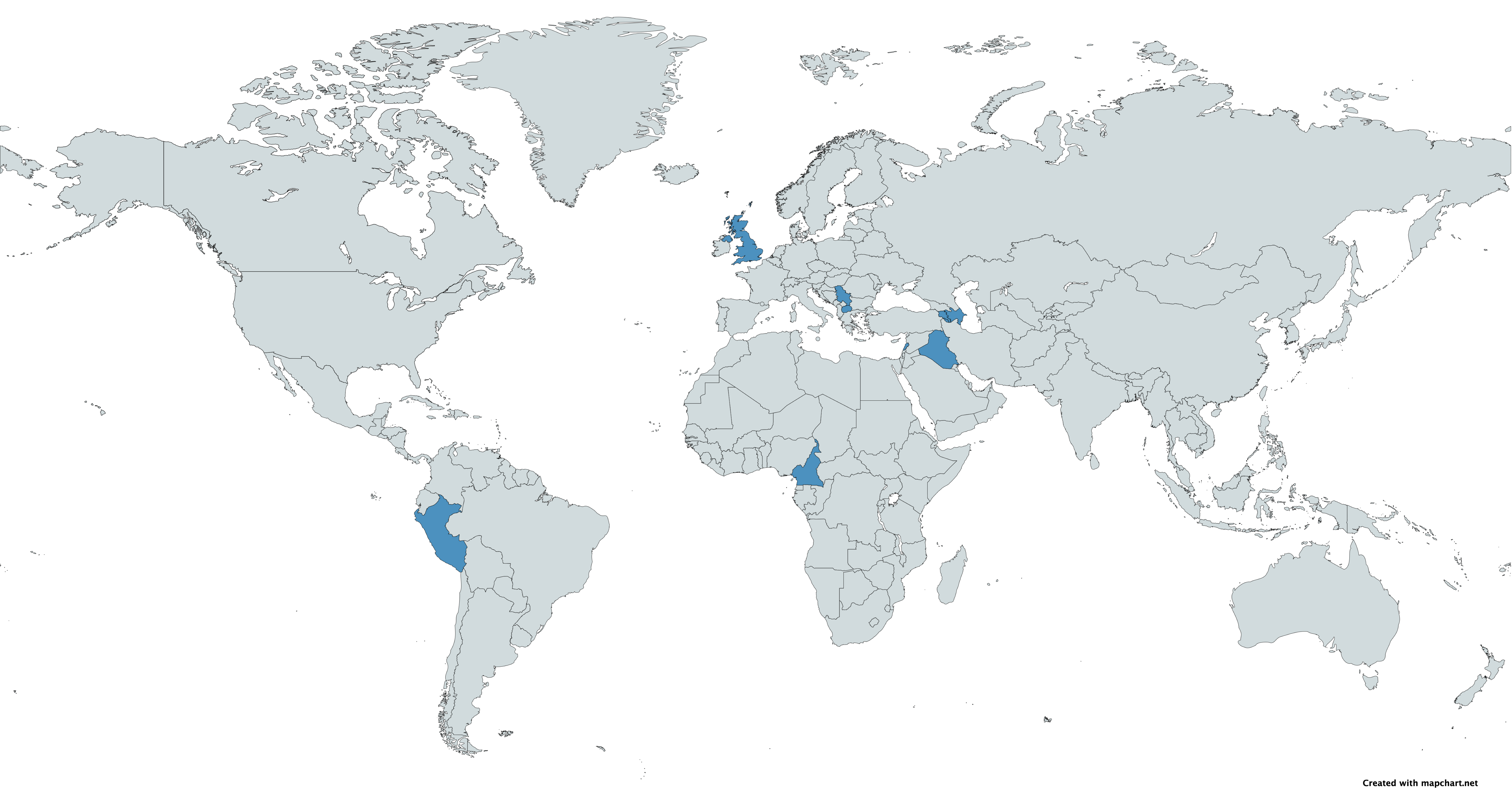
A map with users of the Zastava M21 in blue

- Azerbaijan – Used by special forces
- Bosnia and Herzegovina – Used by the Ministry of Interior of Republika Srpska.
- Cameroon – Used by the Rapid Intervention Brigade
- Iraq
- Lebanon
- North Macedonia – 500 purchased in 2005.
- Peru
- Serbia – standard service rifle of the Gendarmery and the reserve service rifle of the Serbian Armed Forces.

== See also ==
- Zastava M70
- Zastava M90
- Zastava M19
- List of assault rifles
