= Zastava M76 =

Serbian designated marksman rifle

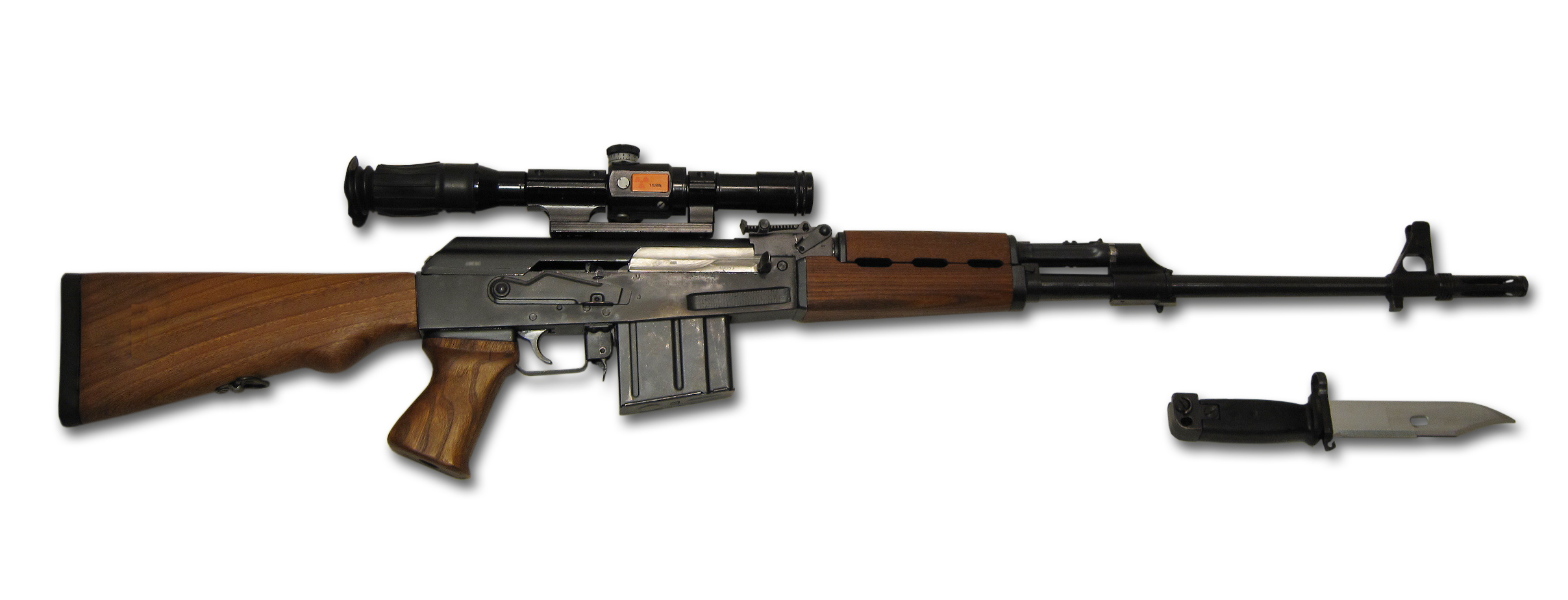
- Zastava M76 with ZRAK M76 4× 5°10′ sight and bayonet
- Type: Designated marksman rifle
- Place of origin: Yugoslavia

Service history
- In service: 1976–present
- Used by: See Users
- Wars: Yugoslav Wars; Lebanese Civil War; Iraq War

Production history
- Designer: Zastava Arms
- Designed: 1975
- Manufacturer: Zastava Arms
- Variants: See Variants

Specifications
- Mass: 4.6 kg (10.1 lb)
- Length: 1,135 mm (44.7 in)
- Barrel length: 550 mm (21.7 in)
- Cartridge: 7.92×57mm Mauser
- Muzzle velocity: 730 m/s (2,395.0 ft/s)
- Effective firing range: 800 m (875 yd)^{+} with optics
- Feed system: 10 round detachable box
- Sights: backup iron sights adjustable to 1,000 m (1,100 yd) optical sights can be mounted on a rail Iron sights or sniper scope

The Zastava M76 is a military semi-automatic designated marksman rifle developed and manufactured by Zastava Arms.

== History ==
The Zastava Arms Company released the M76 in the mid-1970s. Since then it became the standard issue designated marksman rifle in the Serbian army and its predecessor the Yugoslav People's Army (JNA). It was designed to fulfill the same role as the Soviet Dragunov SVD, which was to provide a designated marksman capability to the infantry platoon. During the Yugoslav Wars of the 1990s and early 2000s, it was used by several sides; it saw action in Croatia, Bosnia, Kosovo and North Macedonia. In Serbian service The M76 is reportedly being replaced by the Zastava M91. The Zastava M91 uses the 7.62×54mmR cartridge which is replacing the 7.92×57mm Mauser (M49/M75) cartridge in Serbian service.

== Design details ==
The M76 is similar in concept to the Soviet Dragunov SVD sniper/designated marksman rifle; a semi-automatic rifle using a full-power cartridge from a 10-round magazine. However, the M76 is closer to the AK-47/RPK design and Zastava's unlicensed M70 AK-derivative than the Dragunov SVD, similar to the Romanian PSL. Being derived from the AK design it is simple and reliable, and like other Zastava AK-derivatives it is of high-quality manufacture. Accuracy is typically around 1.5 MOA, which is good for a Kalashnikov design and entirely acceptable for the designated marksman role.

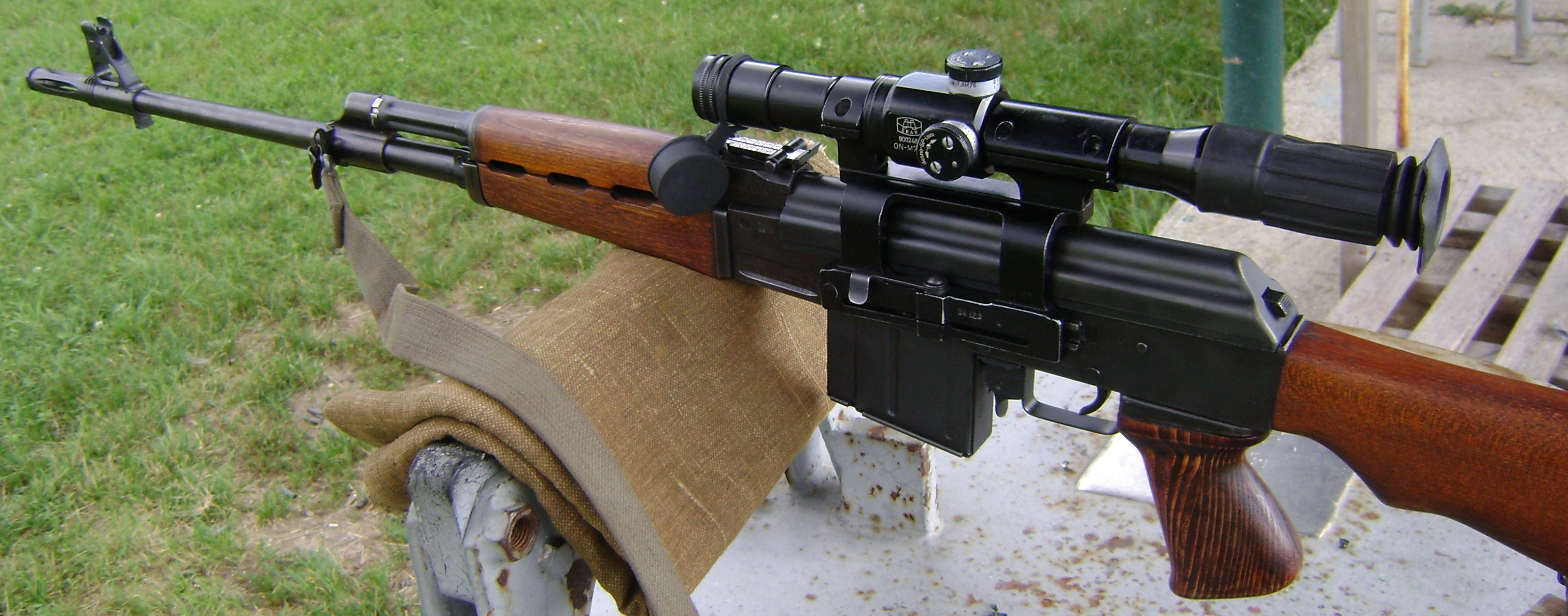
ZRAK ON-M76 4× 5°10′ mounted on a Zastava M76.

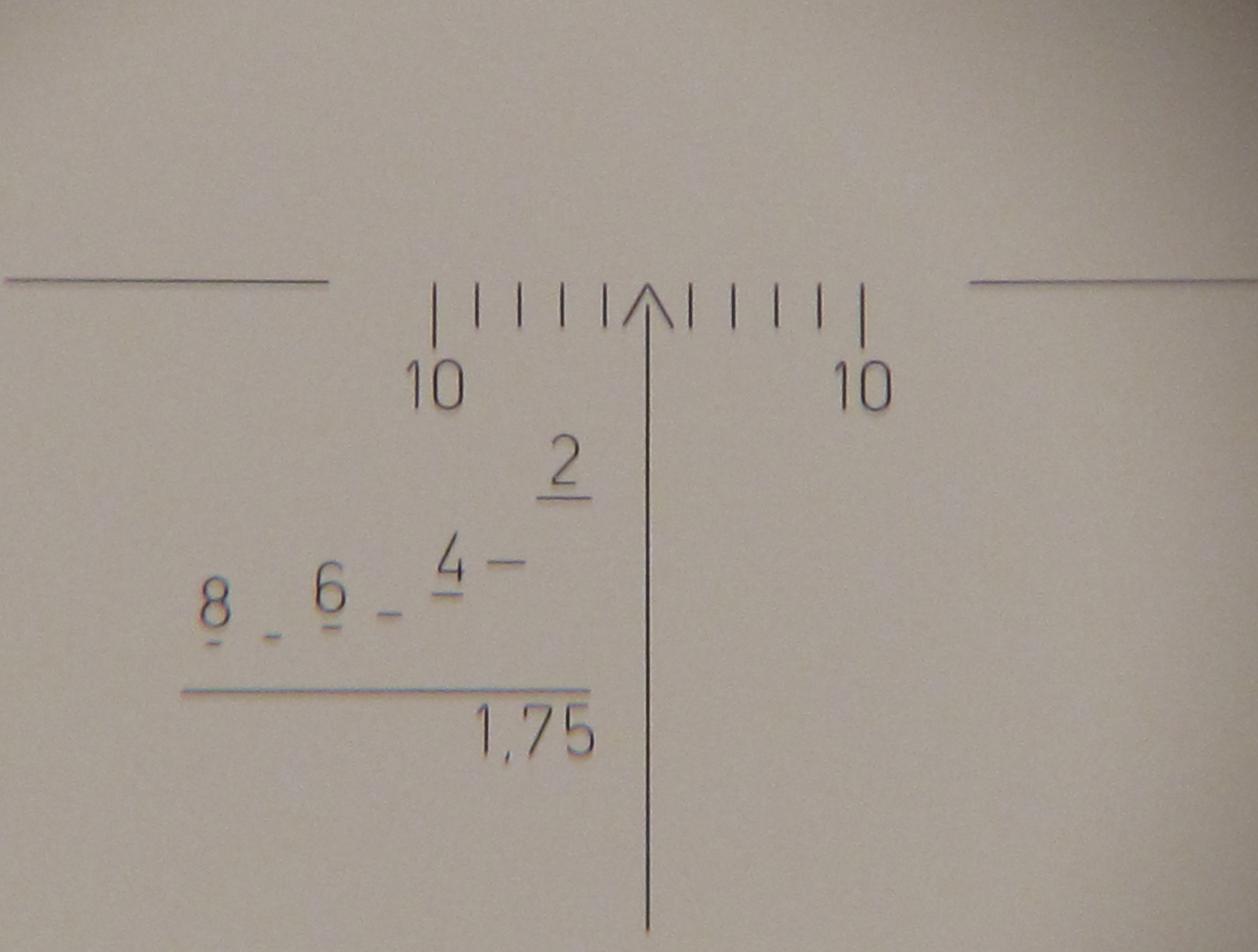
ZRAK ON-M76 4× 5°10′ reticle layout. The top center "chevron" (^) is used as the main aiming mark. The horizontal hash marks are for windage and lead corrections and can be used as mil marks for ranging as well. In the bottom-left corner is a stadiametric rangefinder that can be used to determine the distance from a 1.75 meters (5 ft 8.9 in) tall person/object from 200 m (2) to 800 m (8).

Rather than being a Dragunov clone, it looks more like a lengthened AK-47 with a heavier barrel, an impression strengthened by the separate stock and pistol grip rather than the Dragunov's thumbhole combination stock. Instead of the Dragunov's 7,62×54mmR chambering it uses the 7.92×57mm Mauser a.k.a. the 7.9mm or 8×57mm IS round. The Yugoslav People's Army (JNA) adopted a 7.9 mm Cartridge, Ball M49 variant, designated as M49, as infantry ammunition at the end of the 1940s and later a 7.9 mm Cartridge, Sniper, with Universal ball M75, as sniper ammunition made to tighter tolerances, designated as M75. Instead of the Dragunov's separate gas piston, the M76 has an AK-type piston attached to the bolt carrier. The receiver is a milled forging like that of the original AK-47 to give greater rigidity when firing a full-power round and it is longer than the normal AK receiver to suit the 7.92×57mm Mauser chambering. The AK-type rotating bolt, bolt carrier, barrel and other parts are also enlarged and stronger for handling the bolt thrust full-power rounds produce. Feeding is via a 10-round steel box magazine, which has a follower that holds the bolt open after the last shot. Since there is no device in the weapon to hold the bolt to the rear, the bolt will move forward when the magazine is removed, which increases the difficulty of removing the magazine. Fire is semi-automatic only, so the AK-47-type safety on the right side of the receiver has only 2 settings - 'safe' and 'fire'. The barrel has a tapered profile with a Dragunov-type combination slotted flash suppressor and foresight housing. A standard AKM bayonet can be fitted to the bayonet lug below the foresight. Like the Dragunov, but unlike the AK-47, the M76 features a 4-position (0, 1, 2, 3) operator-adjustable gas regulator enabling more propellant gas to be vented to the piston in marginal operating conditions or less propellant gas when using a suppressor. The "0" setting entirely blocks the gas impulse to the piston, enabling use of the rifle as a manual repeater.

The furniture features a straight comb butt, which has a rubber pad similar to that found on the Zastava M70 series of weapons, and a well-shaped contoured pistol grip. The fore-end is also reminiscent of that found on the M70 series. There is no butt trap for cleaning kit storage in the wooden butt. In newer production models the wooden furniture is replaced with synthetic polymer material which offers some storage space for accessories like a cleaning kit and reduces the M76 overall weight by approximately 0.5 kilograms (1.10 lb).

With the minor exception of the gas regulator, disassembly and operation are similar to that of the AK-47/AKM family of weapons.

Though the M76 fires its bullets at a relatively modest 730 m/s (2,395 ft/s) muzzle velocity, the 8×57mm IS cartridge loaded with aerodynamically efficient 12.8 grams (197.53 gr) military sS ball bullets still offers a supersonic reach of ≈ 950 m (1,040 yd) under ICAO Standard Atmosphere conditions at sea level (air density ρ = 1.225 kg/m^{3}). By way of comparison the standard ball round for the 7.62×51mm NATO round is 147 grains (9.53 g), and sniper rounds are around 168–173 grains (10.89–11.21 g), so the M76 round has greater mass.

To mount aiming optics, a side-rail is permanently attached to the left wall of the receiver which accepts an alloy sliding dovetail rail mount with a clamping lever to which can be attached various telescopic sights and night optics. The mount is detachable from the receiver rail in seconds by swinging the locking lever open and sliding the scope and mount off the rail to the rear. It can be removed and reattached without loss of zero. The optic sight is normally removed during field stripping to give easy access to the receiver cover and bolt carrier. The rifle features mechanically adjustable backup AKM-type iron sights with a sliding tangent rear sight, graduated from 100 to 1,000 m (109 to 1,094 yd) in 100 m (109 yd) increments. The front sight post is adjustable for both windage and elevation, using specifically designed tools. The iron sights line includes a battle sight setting corresponding to a 300 m (328 yd) zero using Yugoslavian M49 7.92×57mm 12.8 grams (197.53 gr) ball ammunition. The iron sights can be used with or without the optic sight in place.

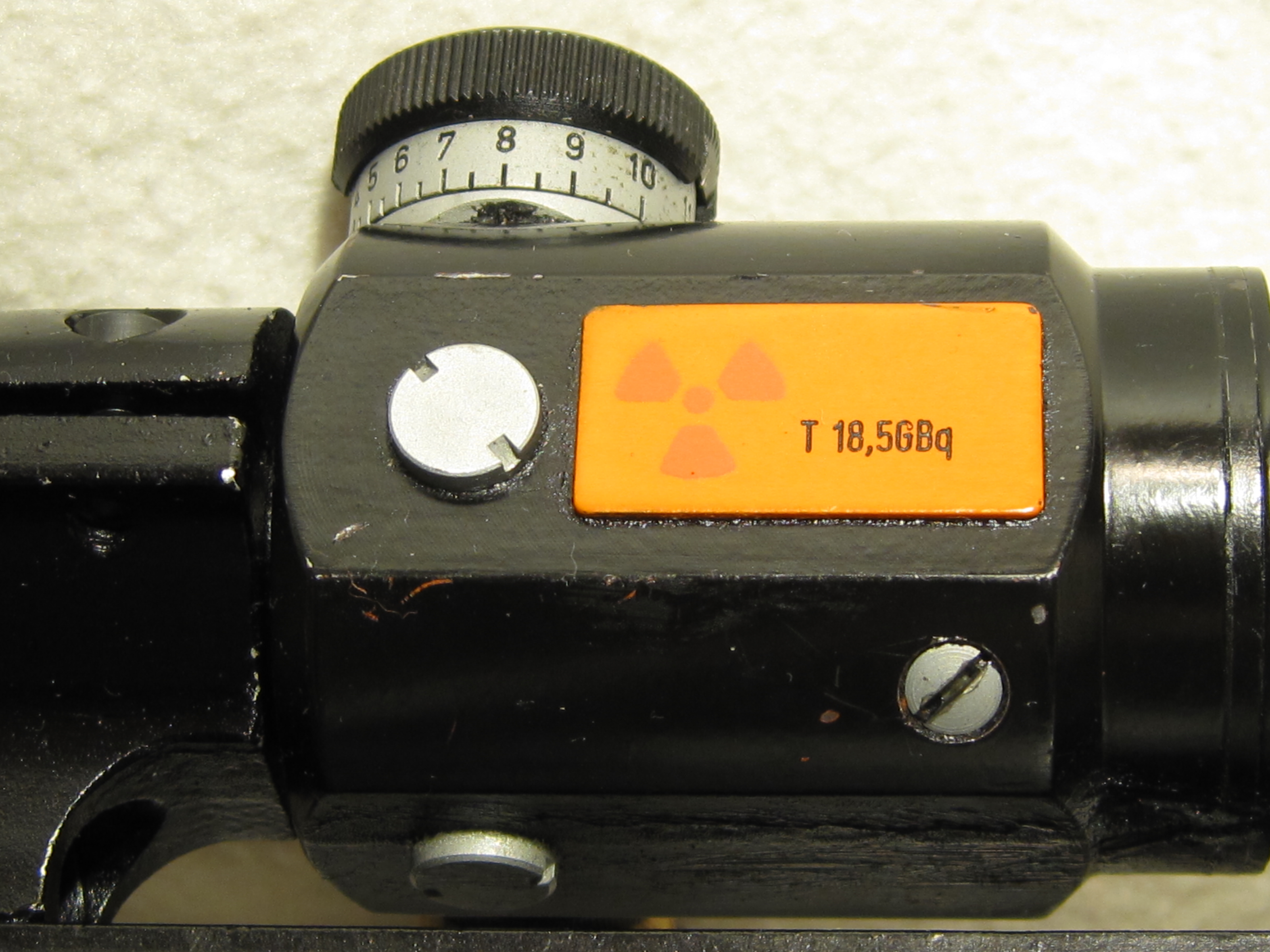
ZRAK ON-M76 elevation turret with bullet drop compensation markings and warning for the radioactive tritium illumination source

The typical telescopic sight used is a ZRAK ON-M76 4× 5°10′ scope originally produced in the ZRAK factory in Sarajevo, Bosnia and Herzegovina which mounts to a Warsaw Pact rail and is positioned centred over the receiver and bore axis. This optical sight is similar to the PSO-1 4×24 sight used on the Russian SVD rifle and the Romanian I.O.R. LPS 4×6° TIP2 4×24 sight used on the PSL rifle. The ON-M76 elevation turret features bullet drop compensation (BDC) in 50 m (55 yd) increments for engaging point and area targets at ranges from 100 to 1,200 m (109 to 1,312 yd). The BDC feature must be tuned at the factory for the particular ballistic trajectory of a particular combination of rifle and cartridge (the 7,9 M75 sniper ammunition) at a predefined air density. With increasing range, inevitable BDC-induced errors will occur when the environmental and meteorological circumstances deviate from the predefined circumstances for which the BDC was calibrated. Marksmen can be trained to understand the main forces acting on the projectile and their effect on their particular gun and ammunition and the effects of external factors at longer ranges to counter these errors. Besides the BDC elevation or vertical adjustment control of the reticle, the windage or horizontal adjustment control of the reticle can also be easily dialed in by the user without having to remove turret caps etc. The reticle illumination of the ZRAK M76 4× 5°10′ is provided by (radioactive) tritium. The tritium light source has to be replaced every 8–12 years, since it gradually loses its brightness due to radioactive decay. The reticle features a PSO-1 type range-finding reticle.

== Performance ==
The M76 is relatively accurate for a semi-automatic rifle. It can achieve 1.5 to 2 Minute of angle using standard surplus ammunition or MOA consistent accuracy with higher quality ammunition. Depending on the nature of the target (point or area target), quality of ammunition, conditions and skill of the shooter the maximum effective range varies. Under normal conditions a maximum effective range of 800 m (875 yd) against man-sized targets for an average sniper is achievable. The dispersion at 900 m (984 yd) is described as 50 cm × 50 cm (20 in × 20 in), which is ≈ 1.9 MOA. Under optimal atmospheric and environmental conditions excellent marksmen might use the M76 up to 1,000 m (1,094 yd). Recoil is described as being modest.

Due to its extensive use in combat service, it has the reputation of a reliable and capable weapon.

There is a known issue, however, with the magazines of the M76 being unreliable. Due to the bolt hold open property of the magazines, the bolt will slam forward when the magazine is removed, putting considerable pressure on the follower. This can result in the follower being jammed in the forward position, rendering the magazine temporarily inoperable.

== Variants ==
Zastava Arms currently offers a civilian variant in .308 Winchester called the LKP M76, which they designate as a semi-automatic sporting rifle. Assault Weapons of Ohio builds M76 variants chambered in .30-06 Springfield and 8mm.

North Korea Manufactures a gun locally known as the Jeogyeok-Bochong. Some sources claim it is a Zastava M76 clone. Others argue it is a local design more closely based on the PSL.

== Users ==
- Iraq: Imported from the former Yugoslav republics in 2005.
- Myanmar: Copy produced as MAS-1 MK-I.
- North Macedonia
- Rwanda
- Saudi Arabia
- Serbia: To be fully replaced by the Zastava M91

=== Former users ===
- Croatia: Phased out and replaced by Sako TRG and Remington M40A5.
- Slovenia: Used during the Ten-Day War
- Yugoslavia

== See also ==
- Dragunov sniper rifle
- Galil Sniper
- PSL (rifle)
- Zastava M91
- Zastava M93 Black Arrow
- Zastava M07
- List of sniper rifles
