= Zastava M57 =

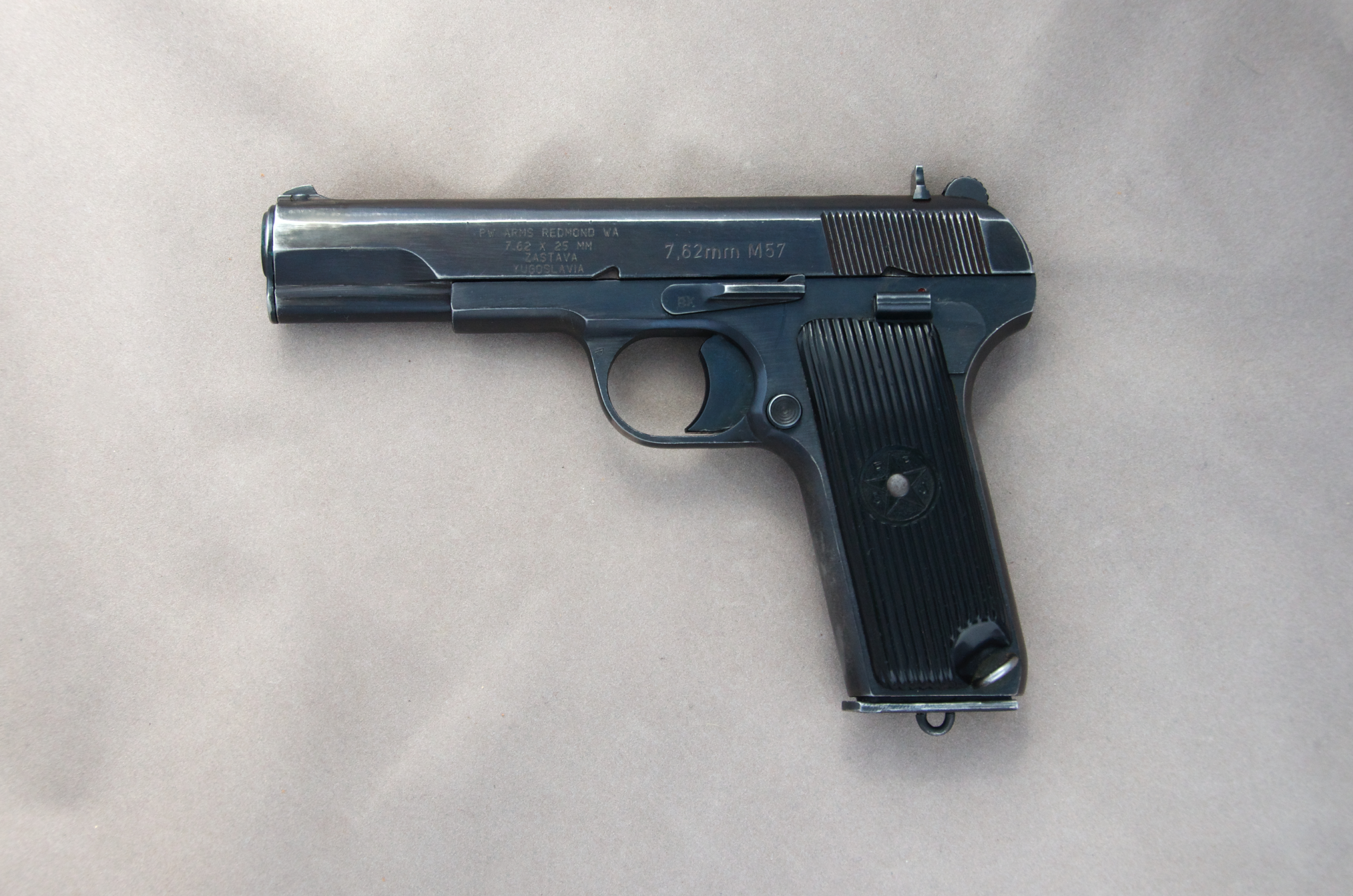
- The M57 with a loaded 9-round magazine.
- Type: Semi-automatic pistol
- Place of origin: Yugoslavia

Service history
- In service: 1961–1992 (Yugoslavia)
- Used by: Yugoslav People's Army
- Wars: Vietnam War; Persian Gulf War; Internal resistance to apartheid Yugoslav Wars; Russian invasion of Ukraine

Production history
- Designer: Zastava Arms
- Designed: 1957
- Manufacturer: Zastava Arms
- Produced: 1963–1982
- No. built: 260,000–270,000
- Variants: See Variants

Specifications
- Mass: 854 g (30.1 oz)
- Length: 194 mm (7.6 in)
- Barrel length: 116 mm (4.6 in)
- Height: 134 mm (5.3 in)
- Cartridge: 7.62×25mm Tokarev
- Action: Short recoil actuated, locked breech, single action
- Muzzle velocity: 480 m/s (1,575 ft/s)
- Effective firing range: 50 m
- Feed system: 9-round detachable box magazine
- Sights: Front blade, rear notch 156 mm (6.1 in) sight radius

The Zastava M57 is a Yugoslavian and Serbian semi-automatic pistol produced by Zastava Arms. It was the standard service pistol of the Yugoslav People's Army from 1961 until the early 1990s. The M57 was an unlicensed derivative of the Soviet TT pistol, with a number of modifications, namely a longer grip and a slightly larger magazine. Zastava reverse engineered the Soviet TT in 1954, and began serial production of the weapon type as the M57 in 1963.

As of 2021, Zastava still produced modernized variants of the M57 with updated safety features: the M57A in its original chambering and the M70A in 9mm Parabellum.

== History ==
Designed in the mid-1950s, the M57 was an unlicensed copy of the Soviet TT-33 Tokarev. The Yugoslav People's Army had initially attempted to adopt the TT as its standard service pistol after World War II, and a number were delivered by the Soviet Union. However, the Tito–Stalin split prompted the Soviet government to cease military aid to Yugoslavia before deliveries of the pistol were fully completed. In 1952, Zastava was charged with developing its own variant of the TT to satisfy the army's needs. Zastava's engineers were able to reverse engineer the weapon by 1954, creating a faithful copy of the original TT. However, its factory was already at capacity manufacturing rifles and submachine guns, and it was unable to open a new production line to produce a new handgun.

The project was shelved until 1956, when army officials again expressed interest in the TT design. Work on an improved TT derivative began in earnest in 1957, and the first prototypes appeared in 1960. The Zastava pistol was formally designated M57 and accepted for service in 1961. Although the army took delivery of various pre-production models that year, serial production was delayed until 1963.

Zastava manufactured the M57 for the Yugoslavian state from 1963 until 1982, at which time at least 260,000 had been produced. It was retired from military service in the former Yugoslavia during the late 1990s and early 2000s, being largely superseded by the Zastava CZ99.

== Design ==
In 1954, Zastava initially unveiled a handgun that was an identical copy of the original TT-33. However, between 1957 and 1960, a number of modifications to the Soviet design were made. The most noticeable difference is that the M57 was designed with a larger magazine that has a capacity of nine rounds as opposed to the TT-33's eight. The M57 was also fitted with a magazine safety, reducing the likelihood of an accidental discharge while the magazine is being removed.

Zastava engineers added a dovetailed front sight that may be adjusted for windage, and the top of the weapon's slide is serrated to reduce glare. There were a few minor internal changes as well, including a unique Zastava firing pin and a captive recoil spring to simplify disassembly.

== Variants ==
- M57: Standard military version.
- M57A: Commercial production model of the M57, with an added external slide safety.
- M70A: Export variant of the M57 chambered for 9×19mm Parabellum and introduced in 1970.
- M70AA: Commercial production model of the M70A, with an added external slide safety.

== Users ==
- Croatia
- Ukraine

=== Former users ===
- Inkatha Freedom Party
- North Macedonia: Issued both the M57 and M70A concurrently as standard service pistols.
- Serbia: Retired in the 2000s.
- Yugoslavia

== See also ==
- TT pistol
- Zastava M70 (.32 ACP/.380 ACP)
- Zastava M88
