= Zastava Arms =

Serbian firearms manufacturer

Coordinates: 44°00′29″N 20°54′51″E

- Native name: Застава оружје Zastava oružje
- Type: Joint-stock company
- Industry: Arms industry
- Founded: 27 October 1853; 172 years ago 31 December 2000; 25 years ago (current form)
- Headquarters: Kosovska 4, Kragujevac, Serbia
- Area served: Worldwide
- Products: Firearms, artillery
- Revenue: ▼€41.78 million (2023)
- Net income: ▲ (€11.57 million) (2023)
- Total assets: ▲€171.58 million (2023)
- Total equity: €0 (2023)
- Owner: Government of Serbia (48%)
- Number of employees: 2,507 (2023)
- Subsidiaries: Zastava Arms USA
- Website: zastava-arms.rs

Zastava Arms (Serbian: Застава оружје, romanized: Zastava oružje) is a Serbian and formerly Yugoslav manufacturer of firearms, based in Kragujevac, Serbia. It is among the leading producer of firearms in the Balkans and a large contributor to the Serbian defense industry. Zastava Arms manufactures and exports a wide variety of products to over forty countries, including the Zastava M70, a variant of the Kalashnikov rifle.

== History ==
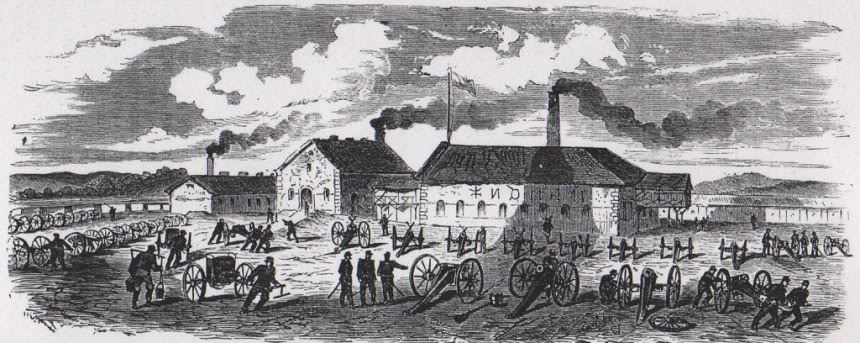
Gun Foundry, 1856

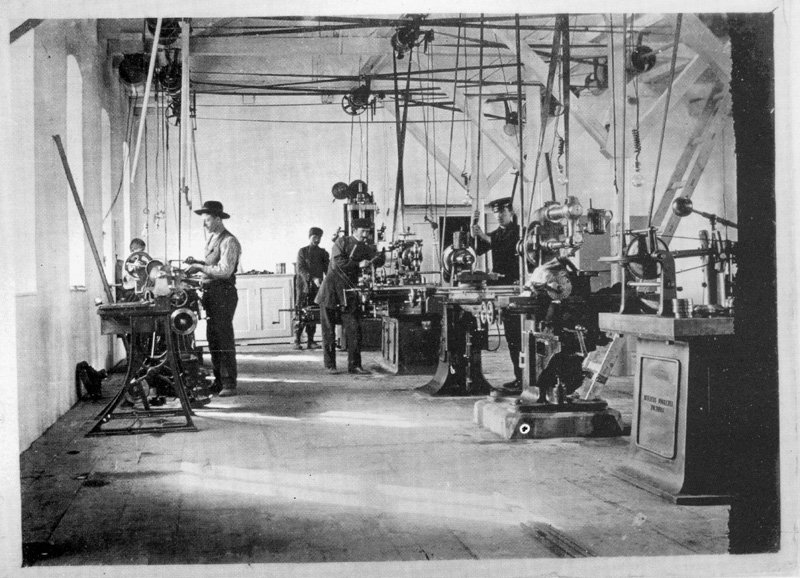
Workshop of Zastava Arms, 1910

The successful production of four four-pound cannons and two short howitzers on 27 October 1853 is date of foundation of Zastava Arms in Kragujevac. Between 1856 and 1860, the facilities in Kragujevac received many upgrades to its manufacturing system, eventually allowing the plant to produce weapons with full parts interchangeability. In 1878, one of the main priorities became the modernization of armaments. Serbian rifle „Piboduša“ Model 1870 Peabody became obsolete with their large 14,9mm caliber. After a research project and a competitive tender in 1879, a new model rifle was chosen as the replacement. The first domestic-made repeating rifle, a derivative of the Mauser Model 1871 bolt-action rifle, was designed in 1880 by Kosta Milovanović and was named Mauzer Milovanović M. 1880, known as "Mauser-Koka" or "Koka's Rifle", after its designer. The weapon was first manufactured in Germany and was called the Mauser-Milovanović M1878/80, cal. 10.15mm. In 1924 and 1925, the Ministry of the Internal Affairs of the Kingdom of Yugoslavia signed contracts with FN Herstal, Belgium which allowed the production of M24 series bolt-action rifles chambered in 7.92×57mm Mauser. A factory for production of rifles and infantry ammunition was also built. The factory for production of infantry ammunition began production on 22 March 1928 and the factory for production of rifles and ammunition began operation on 15 October (the 75th anniversary of the first casting of cannons in Kragujevac). In 1930, the factory started the production of signal pistols 26 mm M 1929 on a Czechoslovak license. In July 1936, the factory received a license from the Czechoslovak Zbrojovka Brno to produce the light machinegun ZB vz. 26 7.9 mm M 1937.

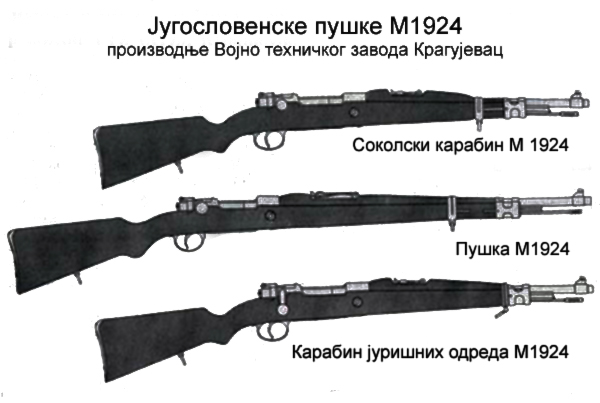
Yugo Mauser Model, 1924

Zastava Arms was heavily damaged during World War II. When Kragujevac was liberated on 21 October 1944, the weapons factory was repaired to working order within months and production began shortly after, with the 9 mm M 1944 B2 submachine gun developed the same year. The next postwar production rifle was the 7.92×57mm Mauser Model 1948 based on the Model 24. The production of air rifles and sporting rifles on the basis of the M48 rifle started in 1953. In 1954, Zastava started the production of shotguns and small bore rifles, as well as the 7.9 mm M53 "Sarac" machine gun. Batch production of the 7.62×39mm PAP M59 semi-automatic rifle started in 1964. In the 1964, the factory started the development of an automatic rifle based on the Kalashnikov system, which was designated the M67 in 1967. On the basis of the M67 rifle, the factory developed an automatic rifle chambered in 7.62×39mm, which was named the Zastava M70 in the following year. The Yugoslav People's Army adopted the M70 assault rifle into its arsenal in 1970. Small arms derivatives of the M70 produced rifles chambered in Western bloc ammunition such as 7.62×51mm NATO and 5.56×45mm NATO were also produced. In 1988, the factory developed a compact pistol in 9 mm Parabellum, the M88.

In the 1980s, the plant for the M84, M86 in 7.62×54mmR and 12.7 NSV M87 machine guns began to operate. In July 1989, Zastava started the development of a double-action pistol in caliber 9mm PARA CZ 99. In 1992, the factory finished the development and testing and started batch production of the 7.62 mm M92 carbine, based on the M85 carbine. Using the Mauser mechanism, the factory developed a 12.7 mm long range rifle, the Black Arrow M93.

During the Yugoslav Wars of 1991 to 1995, the United Nations imposed economic sanctions on the import and export of weapons from Yugoslavia. Production slowed as a result. In 1999, the factory was damaged by NATO bombing.

In 2005, a memorandum of understanding was signed with Remington Arms to export hunting and sporting guns to the United States, Canada and Mexico. From 2005 to 2014, Zastava Arms underwent restructuring.

In 2013, the Government of Serbia decided to convert debt of defence industry companies to state into shares in a company, with Zastava Arms owing the most at over 80 million euros in taxes. However, the realization of that decision has been postponed indefinitely, making Zastava Arms the most indebted defense industry company in Serbia.

The Government of Serbia invested 9.7 million euros in the factory's modernisation in 2017, for the needs of defence industry.

In 2019, the creation of Zastava Arms USA was announced, which would serve as "exclusive importer and distributor" of Zastava Arms products for the US market.

Production of firearms in 2020 increased 20%, despite the COVID-19 pandemic. The contracts signed in 2020 were worth 95 million dollars, with buyers mostly from Asia, Africa, and the United States.

== Products ==
- Semi-automatic sporting rifles/pistols: Zastava PAP series
- Bolt-action rifles: Zastava M48, M70
- Semi-automatic rifles: Zastava PAP M59
- Submachine guns: M56, M97, Master FLG
- Sniper rifles: M76, M91, M07, SRX20
- Pistols: P25, M57/M70A, M70, M88, CZ99, PPZ
- Select-fire rifles: M70, M77, M80, M85, M90, M92, M21, M19, M05, M17
- Machine guns: M1937; Light machine guns: M72, M77, M84; Heavy machine guns: M87, M02 Coyote M53
- Anti-materiel rifles and other: M93 Black Arrow, M12 Black Spear
  - The M12 Black Spear can be chambered for either 12.7×108mm (maximum range 1,800 m) or .50 BMG (maximum range 1,600 m) ammunition. On top of the chamber has a Picatinny rail to fix different types of optical devices.

=== Anti-aircraft autocannons ===
Name	Type	Prod. years	Cartridge	Photo	Notes
Zastava M55	triple-barreled	1978–	20 mm		
Bofors 40 mm gun	anti-aircraft/multi-purpose	1978–	40 mm L/60–70		L70 version with laser-computer group under license from Bofors

== See also ==
- Defense industry of Serbia
