= Zastava M77 =

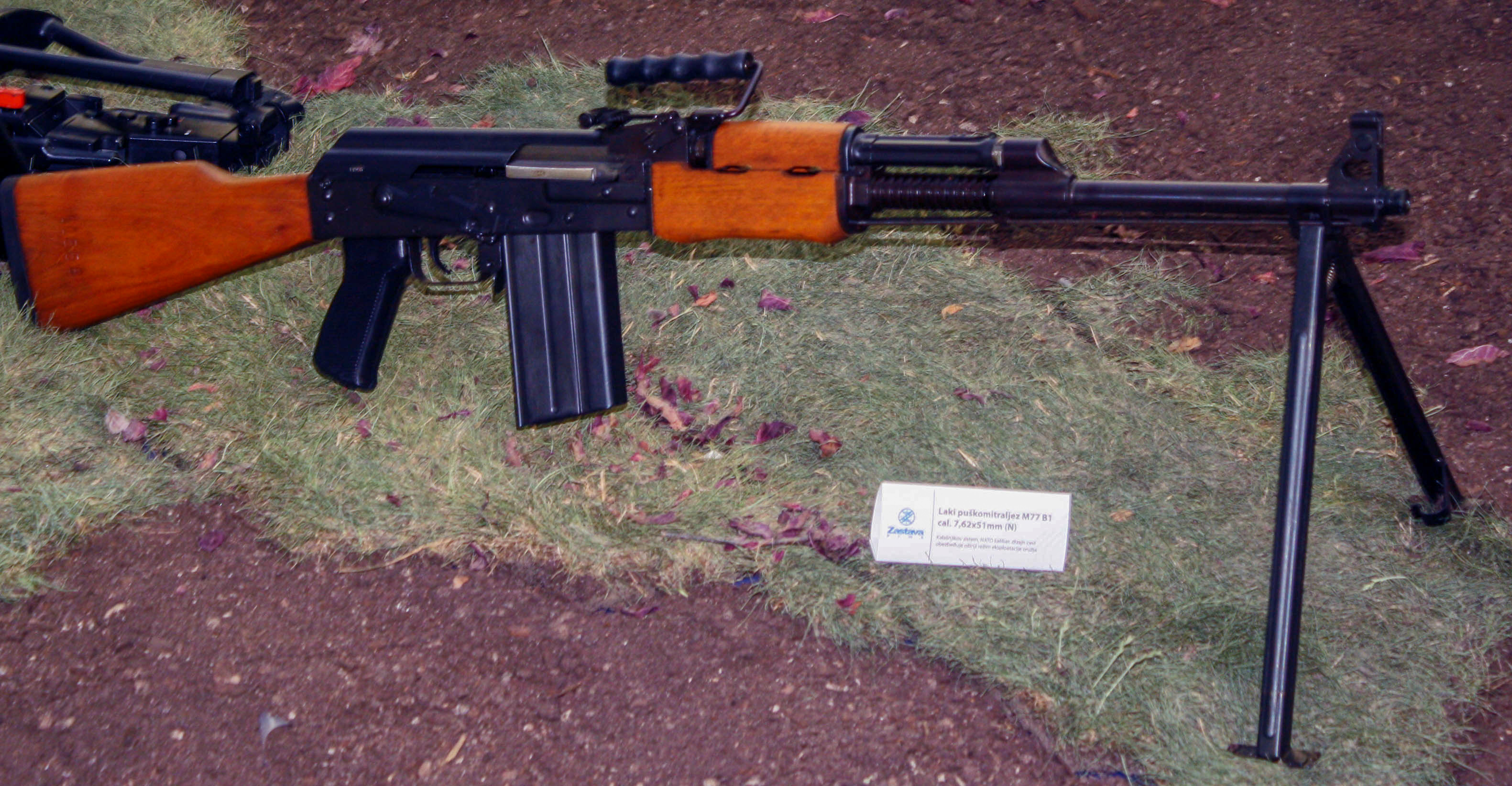
- Zastava M77
- Type: Battle rifle Light machine gun
- Place of origin: Yugoslavia

Service history
- In service: 1977–present
- Wars: Lebanese Civil War; Yugoslav Wars

Production history
- Manufacturer: Zastava Arms

Specifications
- Mass: 4.8 kg
- Length: 990 mm
- Barrel length: 500 mm
- Cartridge: 7.62×51mm NATO
- Caliber: 7.62 mm
- Action: Gas-actuated (rotating bolt)
- Rate of fire: Semi-automatic, fully automatic
- Muzzle velocity: 840 m/s
- Effective firing range: 600 m
- Feed system: 20-round detachable magazine
- Sights: Adjustable iron sights, optional mount required for optical sights

The Zastava M77 is a 7.62x51mm battle rifle and light machine gun developed and manufactured by Zastava Arms. It is a Kalashnikov pattern rifle based on the Zastava M70. While early versions of the M77 had a milled receiver, later variants would be built with the standard Yugoslavian 1.5mm stamped RPK receivers. The stamped variants would also have an adjustable gas system to aide in the use of suppressors. On the machine gun variant, the M77 possess a folding bipod and cooling fins on the barrel to allow for longer strings of fire.

== Import into the United States ==
Between 2014 and 2015, a semi-automatic variant of this rifle was imported into the United States as the M77PS. This variant had a polymer thumbhole stock and a 10-round magazine in order to comply with US import restrictions. In 2022, Zastava Arms USA once again began importing a variant of the M77 onto the US market, this time with a standard fixed stock and 20-round magazine.
