= Zastava M07 =

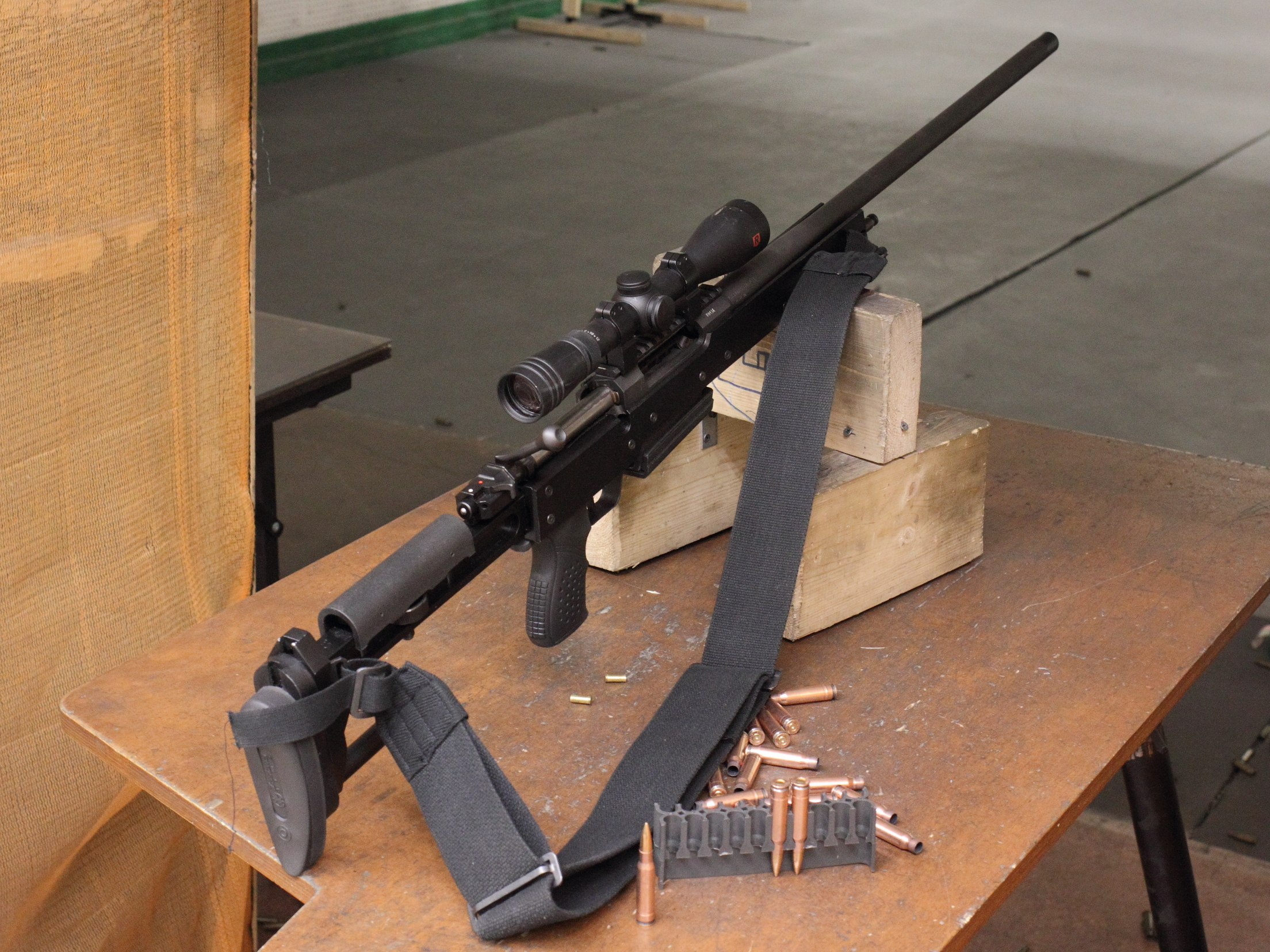
- Zastava M07
- Type: Sniper rifle
- Place of origin: Serbia

Service history
- In service: 2007–Present
- Used by: Serbian Armed Forces

Production history
- Designed: 2006
- Manufacturer: Zastava Arms

Specifications
- Mass: 5.4 kg (11.9 lb) (with optical sight)
- Length: 1,191 mm (46.89 in)
- Barrel length: 650 mm (25.59 in)
- Cartridge: 7.62×51mm NATO
- Action: Bolt action (rotating bolt - long action)
- Rate of fire: user dependent
- Muzzle velocity: 840 m/s
- Effective firing range: 1000 m with optics
- Feed system: 5 round
- Sights: 1,000 m optical sights can be mounted on a rail

The Zastava M07 is a modern military sniper rifle developed and manufactured by Zastava Arms. The M07 rifle is based on the Mauser 98 bolt action and the barrel is made of chrome-vanadium steel. The rifle is loaded from a detachable magazine with a capacity of 5 rounds.
