= Zastava CZ99 =

Serbian semi-automatic pistol

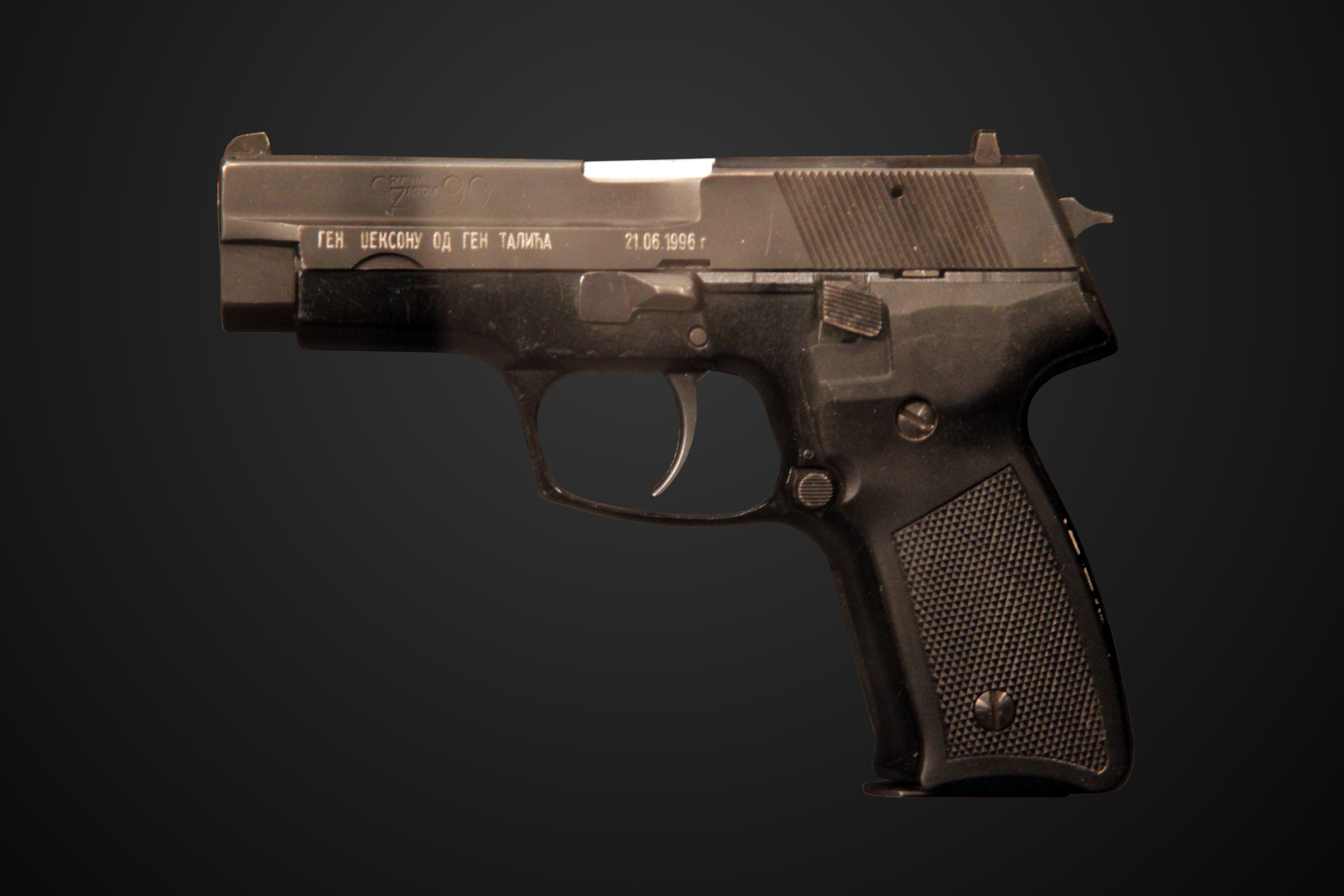
- Zastava CZ99 pistol presented to General Sir Mike Jackson when commanding British troops in the ex-Yugoslavian theatre in the late 1990s. On display at the Parachute Regiment exhibition of the Imperial War Museum in Duxford.
- Type: Semi-automatic pistol
- Place of origin: Yugoslavia

Service history
- Wars: Yugoslav Wars; Second Liberian Civil War

Production history
- Designer: Božidar Blagojević
- Designed: 1989
- Manufacturer: Zastava Arms
- Produced: 1990–present

Specifications
- Mass: 970 grams
- Length: 190mm
- Barrel length: 108mm
- Height: 140mm
- Cartridge: 9×19mm Parabellum and .40 S&W
- Action: Recoil operated (DA/SA or DAO)
- Effective firing range: 50m
- Feed system: 10- or 15-round magazine

The Zastava CZ99 is a semi-automatic pistol produced by Zastava Arms.

== History ==
The pistol was designed in 1989 by Božidar Blagojević.

The CZ99 is no longer produced, however, smaller variants with some modern improvements, the CZ999 and the EZ9, are still being produced.

== Design ==
The CZ99 should not be confused with the Czech firearm manufacturer Česká Zbrojovka, because the CZ in the CZ99's name stands for "Crvena Zastava".

Visually, the pistol resembles a SIG-Sauer P226 and, as such, it is often compared to the SIG. However, the overall design of the pistol took far more inspiration from the Walther P88 than the P226.

The external appearance of the gun and lack of an external extractor were design ideas taken from the P226.

Some of the P88 features that were used on the CZ99 include similar slide serrations, magazine, magazine release, and, of course, the ambidextrous combined safety-decocker.

Also unlike the P226, the CZ99 also has a machined steel slide. The P226 (at the time of this pistol's design) had a stamped and welded sheet steel slide.

The CZ99 is primarily chambered in 9×19mm Parabellum with a 15-round magazine, although .40 Smith & Wesson variants also exist, with ten-round magazines.

== Variants ==
The CZ999 and the EZ9 are almost identical to the CZ99, however they are redesigned to be more ergonomic. Most parts will interchange between the newer and older designs, but some parts, like the grip panels, will not.

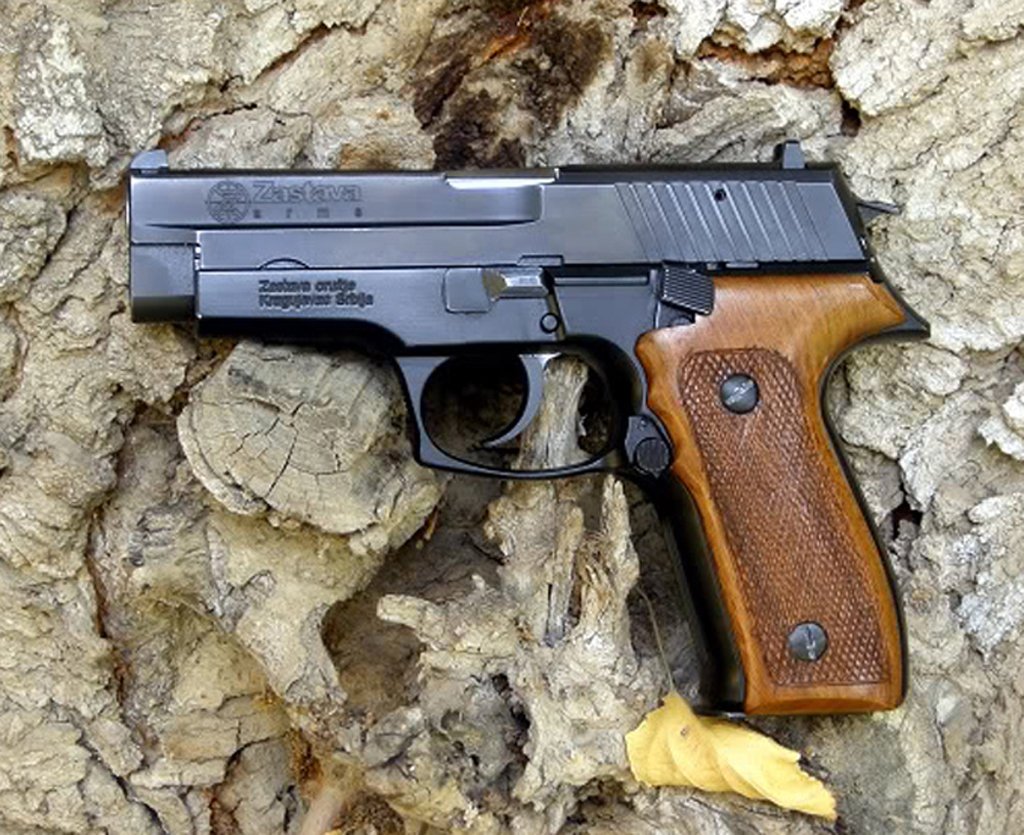
CZ999 Skorpion with custom made grips

=== CZ999 Scorpion ===
The CZ999 Scorpion (Serbian: ЦЗ999) is an updated variant of the CZ99 with some improvements, such as a slimmer grip and redesigned grip panels, wider slide serrations, a serrated backstrap, standard 3-dot sights, a curved trigger, a square trigger guard and a longer hammer spur.

While initially intended for the 9×19mm, there is a variant of the CZ99 chambered in .40 S&W, primarily for foreign importers, with many of these handguns imported by the US in 1990.

Over time though, newer versions of this firearm have been developed: The Zastava CZ999, with DAO and DA/SA selector, as well as the CZ999 Scorpion without this selector. Also features a loaded chamber indicator. Comes in compact model as well.

=== Zastava EZ ===
Fourth generation CZ99. It is the same as the CZ999, however it has an under-barrel picatinny rail for mounting lights and accessories and a larger ring hammer. Service- and personal defence gun, single/double action, ambidextrous. The CZ999 and EZ9 do accept standard CZ99 magazines, but they will not accept all CZ99 parts, such as grip panels. Also like the CZ999, the EZ9 exists in two calibers. There are compact versions of both calibers.

=== KSN Golan ===
Israeli clone of the CZ99, with rights being purchased after Zastava halted production.

Though the Golan lacks the CZ99's loaded chamber indicator and has a shorter slide and barrel, different grips, and other minor cosmetic variations from the CZ99, it is virtually identical in internal design, and some parts are interchangeable between the two.

=== Tressitu TZ99 ===
South African clone of the CZ99.

In the early 1990s South African company Tressitu entered into a licensing agreement with Crvena Zastava to produce a licensed copy named the TZ99, offered in both 9×19mm and .40 S&W.

The TZ99 was only produced for a short period before the company went out of business in the mid-1990s. A number of TZ99s stored from the dissolution were imported to the US in the mid-2000s.

== Adoption ==
The CZ99 replace the outdated Zastava M57 in Yugoslavian military service because of its many new features, such as a fully chromed barrel, tritium night sights, an indicator for the last three rounds remaining in the magazine and a loaded chamber indicator.

The CZ99 is still used in military and police service throughout the Balkans.

== Users ==
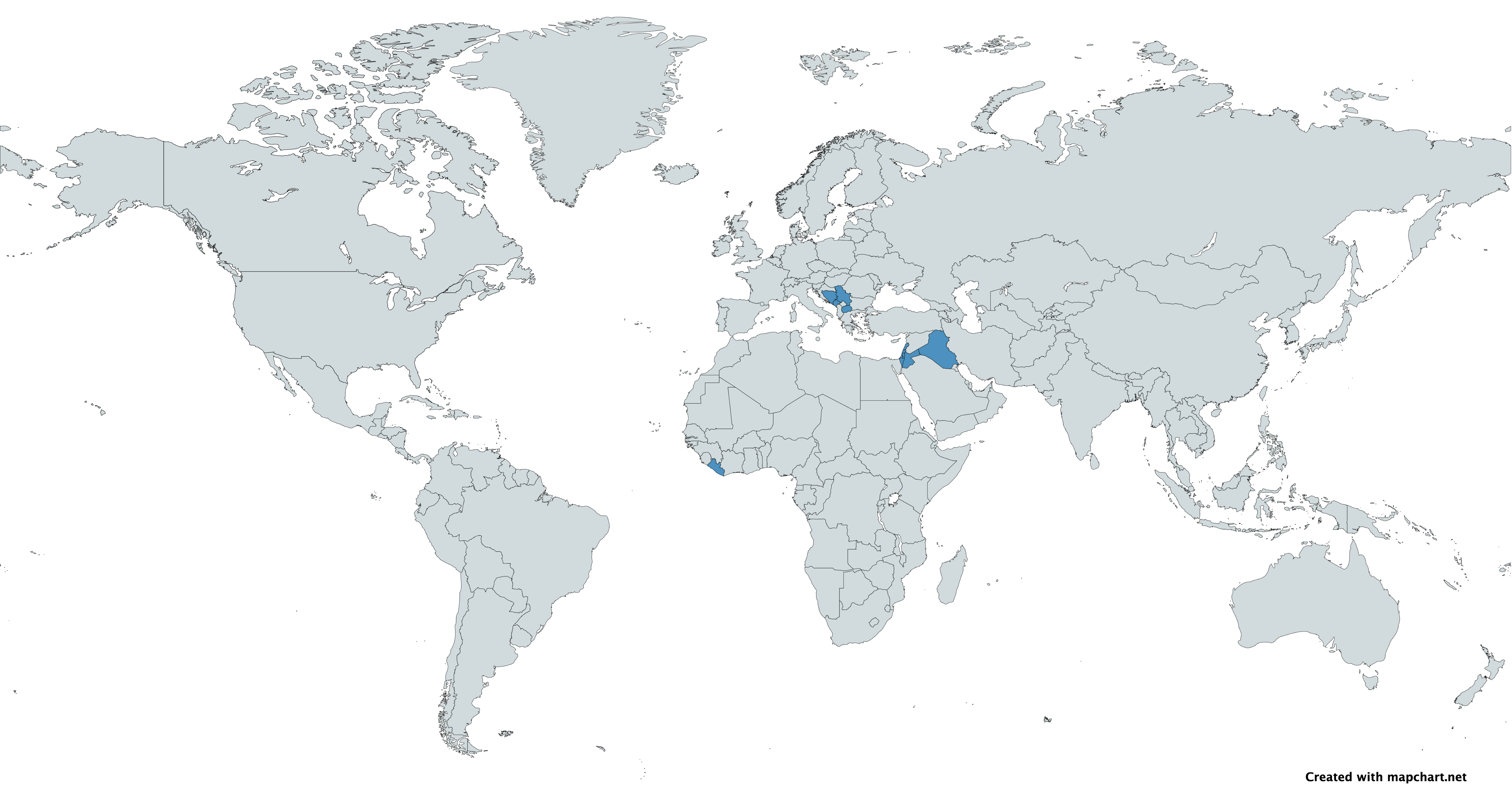
Map with Zastava CZ99 users in blue

- Bosnia and Herzegovina
- Iraq
- Israel
- Jordan
- Lebanon
- Liberia
- Montenegro
- North Macedonia
- Palestine
- Serbia

== See also ==
- SIG Sauer P226
- Zastava PPZ – CZ99's successor
