= Bechowiec-1 =

Bechowiec
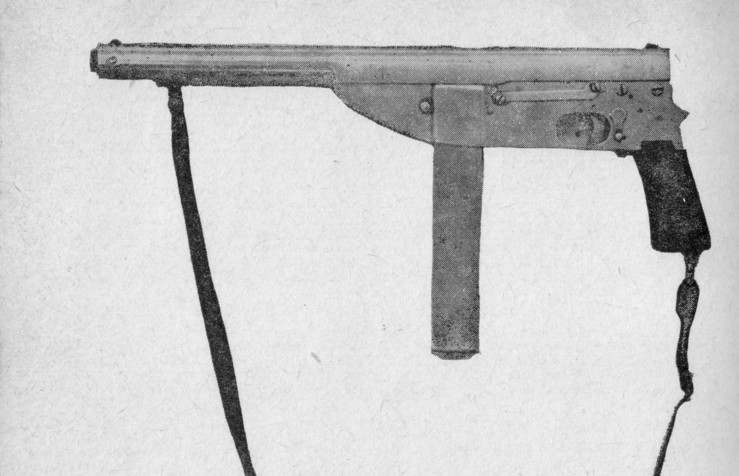
- Bechowiec SMG as seen in the Museum of the Polish Army
- Type: Submachine gun
- Place of origin: Poland

Service history
- In service: 1943–1945
- Wars: World War II

Production history
- Designer: Henryk Strąpoć
- Designed: 1943
- No. built: c. 13

Specifications
- Mass: 2.43 kg (5.4 lb) , 2.82 kg (6.2 lb) (without / with magazine)
- Length: 445 mm (17.5 in)
- Barrel length: 240 mm (9.4 in)
- Cartridge: 9×19mm Parabellum; 7.62×25mm Tokarev
- Action: blowback, closed bolt
- Muzzle velocity: c. 365 m/s (1,200 ft/s)
- Feed system: 32-round box magazine
- Sights: Iron

Bechowiec (a.k.a. Bechowiec-1) was a Polish World War II submachine gun developed and produced by the underground Bataliony Chłopskie (BCh, Peasants' Battalions) resistance organization. It was designed in 1943 by Henryk Strąpoć and was produced in underground facilities in the area of Ostrowiec Świętokrzyski. Its name was coined after the Bataliony Chłopskie organization members, who were informally called bechowiec (plural: bechowcy).

== History ==
The gun's designer was Henryk Strąpoć (born 1922), a blacksmith and self-taught amateur gunsmith in the village of Czerwona Góra, Świętokrzyskie Voivodeship. Between 1936 and 1939 he illegally built four semi-automatic pistols of his own design. During the German occupation of Poland, he became a gunsmith for the local Bataliony Chłopskie underground organization. In the spring of 1943 he completed a working prototype of his own submachine gun, later named Bechowiec. He later improved the design with the help of Jan Swat, who formerly worked as a mechanic in the metalworks in Ostrowiec Świętokrzyski.

The headquarters of Opatów BCh district, lacking machine guns, decided to organize serial production of the Bechowiec. This was possible thanks to the clandestine production of parts for the guns in a metalworks in Ostrowiec Świętokrzyski, without the knowledge of the German administration. These parts were produced there and, from October 1943, were smuggled out by workers. Final construction of the guns was done in Strąpoć's village blacksmith shop, with primitive muscle-powered tooling. Barrels were made from scrapped World War I vintage rifles, but had to be hand-cut and rebored to 9 mm caliber.

The first two new Bechowiec submachine guns were completed in January 1944. By July 1944, 11 were completed in Czerwona Góra, and at least two more in Jan Swat's workshop in Broniszowice. Some 20 were in production, but as the tide of the war turned, the front lines approached the village. The German presence intensified and forced a halt to the secret firearm production. The unfinished weapons and parts were hidden.

The weapons were distributed among Bataliony Chłopskie and affiliated Ludowa Straż Bezpieczeństwa (People's Security Guard) partisan units, mostly in the area around Opatów. Only one Bechowiec-1 is thought to be in existence; it is currently exhibited in the Polish Army Museum in Warsaw.

The next gun with this name was the Bechowiec-2, designed and produced from April 1944 by Jan Swat in Broniszowice, and patterned after the Sten gun.

== Design ==
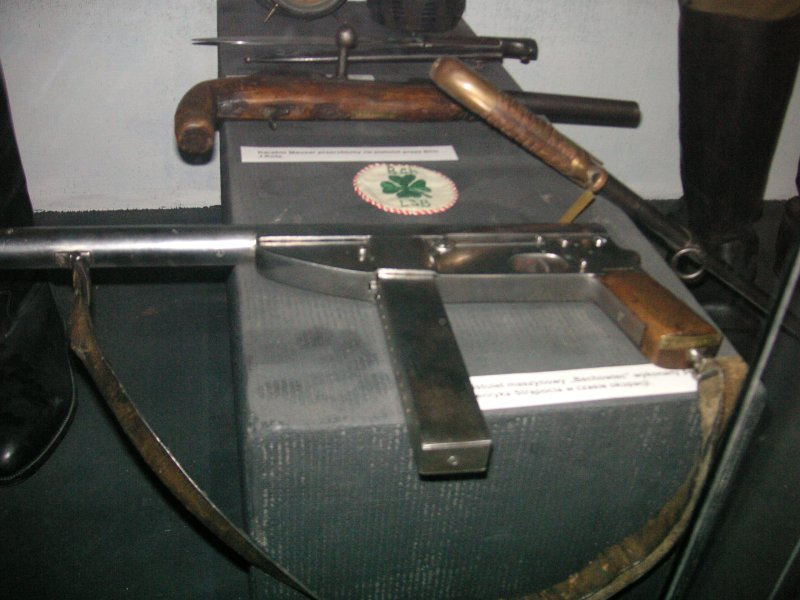
Bechowiec as seen in the Polish Army Museum in Warsaw

A lack of experience of Strąpoć in machine guns' designing and lack of direct patterns resulted in several original construction features, similar to semi-automatic pistols, and hence why the weapon is sometimes referred to as a machine pistol, in spite of size and general layout that is closer to a submachine gun. The Bechowiec-1 had no stock and had quite compact dimensions. It used standard German 9mm Parabellum ammunition which could be easily obtained either by purchase from German soldiers or through armed actions. Three or four last weapons used 7.62×25mm Soviet ammunition, which was of growing popularity among partisans.

The Bechowiec-1 used a slide (much like an automatic pistol) and fired from a closed breech, which added to its accuracy in single-shot mode. It also had an internal hammer and an internal safety device that prevented shooting with a partially opened breech. A breech could be brought back by pulling a transport belt, fixed to a slide under the barrel. The gun had a three-position external safety and firing mode selector.

The weapons had a signature "S.H. w.44" on the left side (Strąpoć Henryk, pattern 1944) and "B.H" on the right side. Production Bechowiecs were painted black (the surviving exhibit weapon was later polished).

== See also ==
- Błyskawica submachine gun
- Choroszmanów submachine gun
- KIS (weapon)
