= Choroszmanów submachine gun =

Pistolet maszynowy Choroszmanów
- Type: Submachine gun

Service history
- In service: Armia Ludowa
- Wars: World War II

Production history
- Designer: Grzegorz Choroszman
- Designed: 1943
- Produced: 1943-1944

Specifications
- Mass: 3.00 kg (6.6 lb) (without magazine)
- Length: 810 mm (32 in)
- Barrel length: 270 mm (10.6 in)
- Cartridge: 7.62×25mm Tokarev
- Action: Blowback
- Rate of fire: 500 rounds/min
- Muzzle velocity: 488 m/s (1,600.6 ft/s)
- Effective firing range: 100 m
- Feed system: 35-round box magazine or 71-round drum magazine
- Sights: Iron sights

Choroszmanów submachine gun (Polish: Pistolet maszynowy Choroszmanów) was a Polish submachine gun created by Grzegorz Choroszman during German occupation of Poland.

Between autumn of 1943 and February 1944 Choroszman manufactured this weapon with his sons in his workshop. It was used by Polish partisans in the Tadeusz Kościuszko unit, which men fought in and around Podlesie.

The design was based roughly on the Soviet PPD-40. It was a simple, sturdy and capable design that was easy and inexpensive to produce. This design allowed Polish partisans to significantly increase the ferocity of raids and guerrilla strikes against the occupiers. Only 22 copies of this gun were created between 1943-1944 due to lack of resources and due to the presence of other firearms.

One SMG was stored in Warsaw museum, another one - in Museum of the Soviet Army in Moscow.

== See also ==
- Bechowiec-1
- Błyskawica submachine gun
- KIS (weapon)

== Literature ==
- С. Плотников. Партизанские самоделки // журнал "Оружие", № 4, 2000.
