= M49 submachine gun =

Crvena Zastava Automat M49
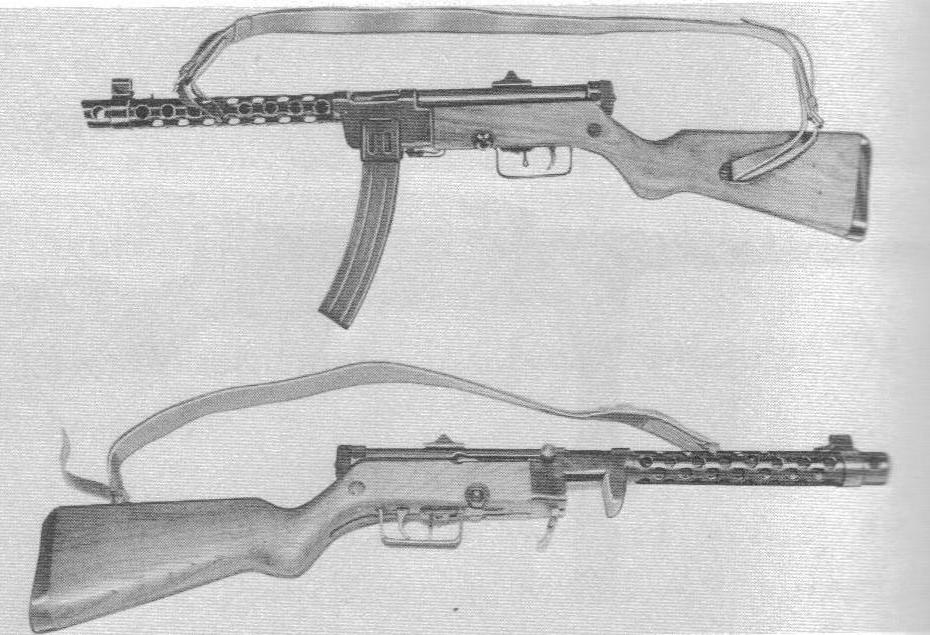
- Profile views of the M49 Submachine Gun
- Type: Submachine gun
- Place of origin: SFR Yugoslavia

Service history
- In service: 1951–1975 (officially, Yugoslav People's Army)
- Wars: Vietnam War, Gulf War, Yugoslav Wars

Production history
- Manufacturer: Crvena Zastava
- Variants: M49, M49/57

Specifications
- Mass: 3.75 kg (8.27 lb)(without magazine)
- Length: 870 mm (34.3 in)
- Barrel length: 270 mm (10.6 in)
- Cartridge: 7.62×25mm Tokarev
- Action: Straight blowback, open bolt
- Rate of fire: 750 rounds/min
- Muzzle velocity: 488 m/s (1,600 ft/s)
- Effective firing range: 200 m
- Feed system: 35-round box magazine or 71-round drum magazine
- Sights: Front blade, flip-up rear iron sights

The M49 submachine gun is a Yugoslavian submachine gun chambered in 7.62×25mm Tokarev, designed for use with the Yugoslav People's Army. While externally similar to the PPSh-41, as well as being able to interchange magazines, the M49 is actually very different in both construction and design. More similar in nature to the Italian Beretta Model 38, the M49 features a one-piece tube receiver which contains the bolt, recoil spring and buffer mechanism. Constructed of machined parts as well as simple tubing, the receiver assembly incorporates a ventilated barrel shroud to protect the operator from being burned during periods of rapid-fire, as well as a simple muzzle brake to steady the weapon.

The M49 is a select fire weapon, with the selector switch being located immediately in front of the trigger, within the trigger guard. The safety is of a push-button variety, which is located on the side of the stock forward of the trigger group. Unlike the later M56 Submachine gun, the M49 features a solid wood stock, similar in construction to that of the M48 Mauser rifle also in use at the time. The M49 is disassembled by unscrewing the cap on the rear of the receiver, permitting all of the internal parts to be extracted through the opening. The M49 and the later M49/57 variant are different only in minor details.

== Users ==
- Yugoslavia
- North Vietnam
- Iraq
- Angola

== See also ==
- PPSh-41
- Beretta Model 38
- Suomi KP/-31
- M56 Submachine gun
