= Type 85 =

Type 85 may refer to:

- Type 85 AFV, a Chinese APC
- Type 85 Susang, a North Korean ATGM tank destroyer
- Type 85 submachine gun
- Type 85/YW 306, 23 mm cannon
- Type 85, a Chinese tank
- W85 Heavy Machine Gun
- AMES Type 85, RAF radar system
- Linesman/Mediator radar systems
- A Chinese produced variant of the SVD (rifle)
