= Błyskawica submachine gun =

Błyskawica
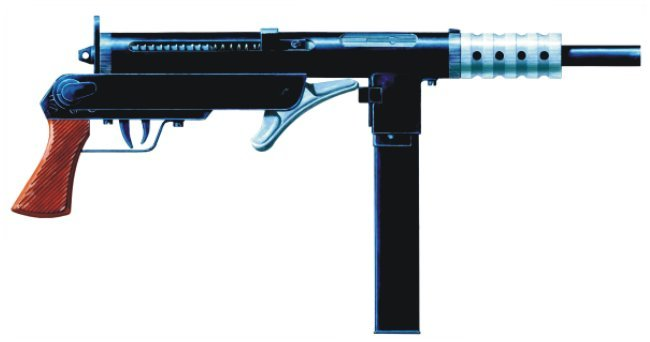
- Błyskawica with its stock folded
- Type: Submachine gun
- Place of origin: Poland

Service history
- In service: 1943 - 1945
- Used by: Poland
- Wars: World War II

Production history
- Designed: 1943
- Produced: 1943 - 1944
- No. built: c. 740
- Variants: none

Specifications
- Mass: 3.22 kg
- Length: 556/730 mm
- Barrel length: 197 mm
- Cartridge: 9×19mm Parabellum
- Action: Blowback
- Rate of fire: 600 round/min
- Muzzle velocity: 400 m/s
- Effective firing range: 200 m
- Feed system: 32-round box magazine

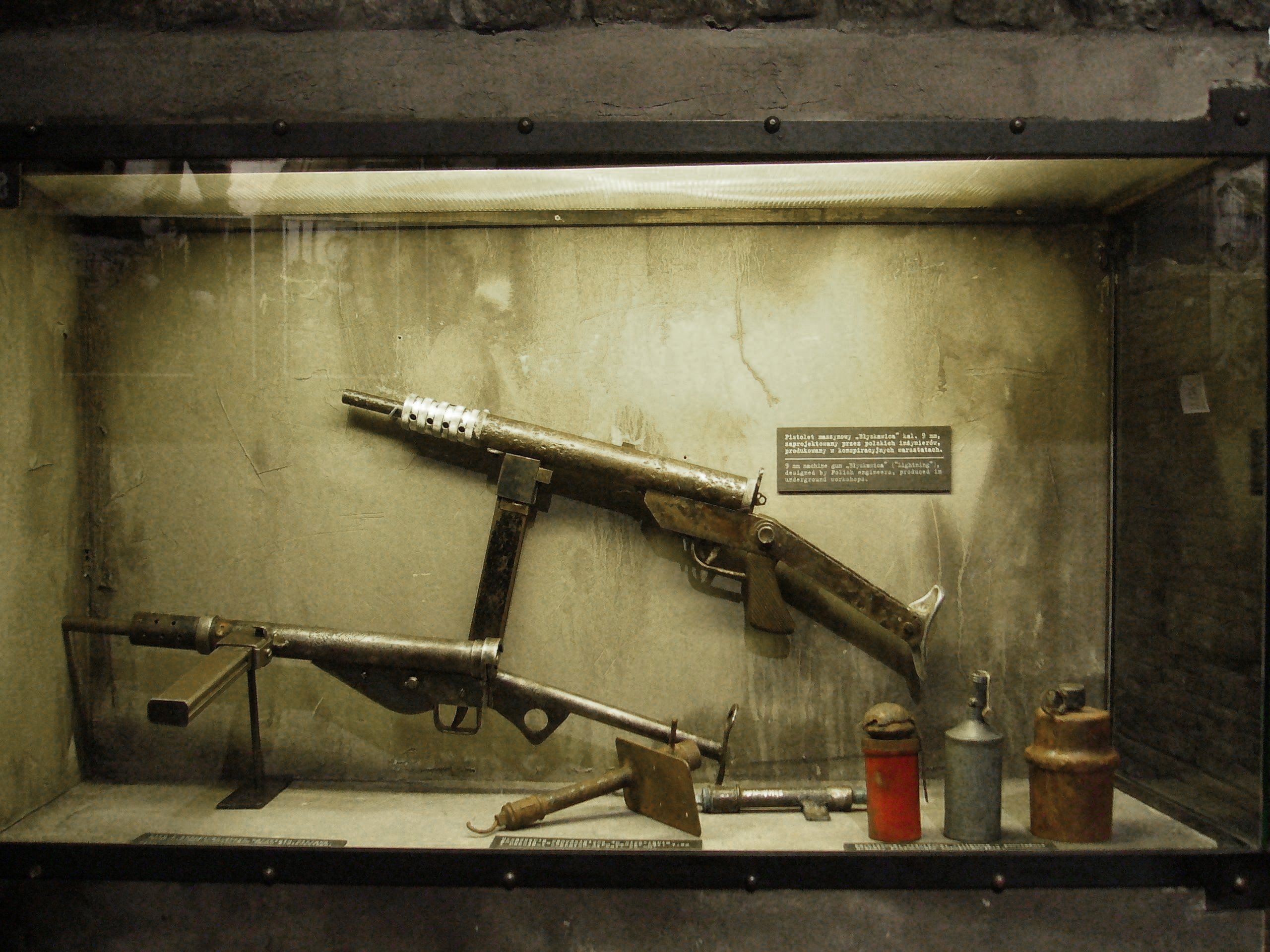
Polish insurgent weapons, including the Błyskawica sub-machine gun, at the Warsaw Uprising Museum.

The Błyskawica (Polish: 'lightning') was a submachine gun produced by the Armia Krajowa, or Home Army, a Polish resistance movement fighting the Germans in occupied Poland. Together with a Polish version of the Sten sub-machine gun, with which it shares some design elements, it was the only weapon mass-produced covertly in occupied Europe during World War II.

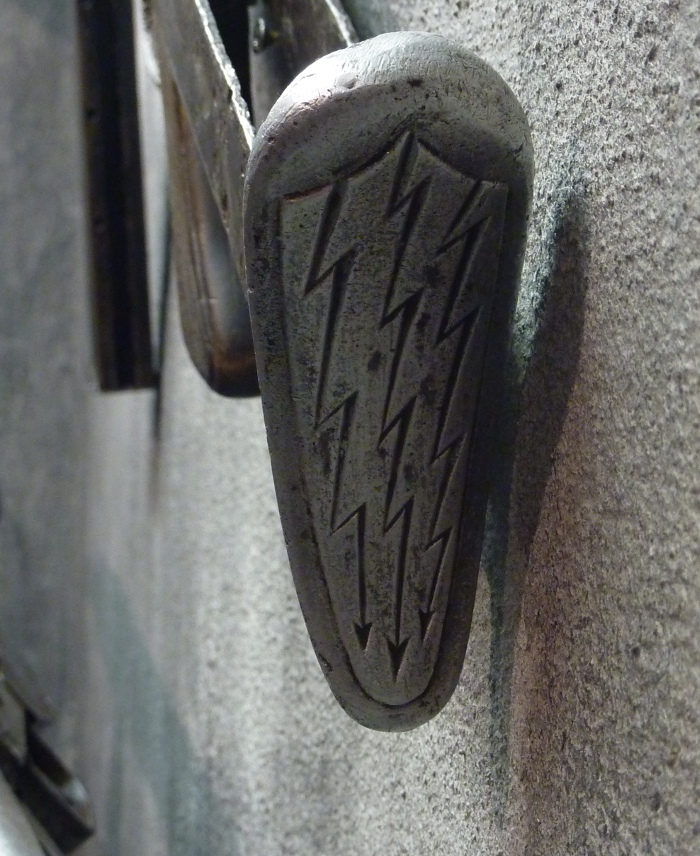
The weapon's buttplate

== History ==
In September 1942, engineer Wacław Zawrotny proposed to the Armia Krajowa command that he and his colleagues prepare a project of a cheap, home-made machine pistol for use by the Polish resistance. Its main feature was its simplicity, so that the weapon could be made even in small workshops, by inexperienced engineers. The idea was accepted, and Zawrotny, together with his colleague Seweryn Wielanier, prepared a project of a sub-machine gun, soon afterward named Błyskawica (Polish for 'lightning'). To allow for easier production, all parts of the weapon were joined together with screws and threads rather than bolts and welding, which were commonly used in firearm production since the 17th century. It is noteworthy, that neither of the designers were gun constructors.

The design was based on two of the most popular submachine guns of the era. The external construction with a retractable butt and magazine mounted below the gun was borrowed from the successful German MP 40. The internal design of the mechanism was modeled after the British Sten. The blowback action with an open bolt offered good performance and high reliability. Unlike the Sten, and its Polish clone called the Polski Sten, it employed a free-floating firing pin and two springs behind the bolt – one served as the return spring and the other as the buffer spring (similar to the later Sterling submachine gun). The weapon was designed in this fashion so that resistance army members could use any captured stocks of German MP40 ammunition cartridges.

The documentation was ready by April 1943, and by September a prototype was ready. After extensive tests in the forests outside of Zielonka near Warsaw, the weapon was presented to the commanding officer of the KeDyw, August Emil Fieldorf, who found the design acceptable. In November the plans were sent to a number of workshops spread throughout occupied Poland and a serial production run was initiated. The name was coined after the three lightning bolts carved on the prototype by its designers, pre-war workers of the Elektrit company that used a similar logo.

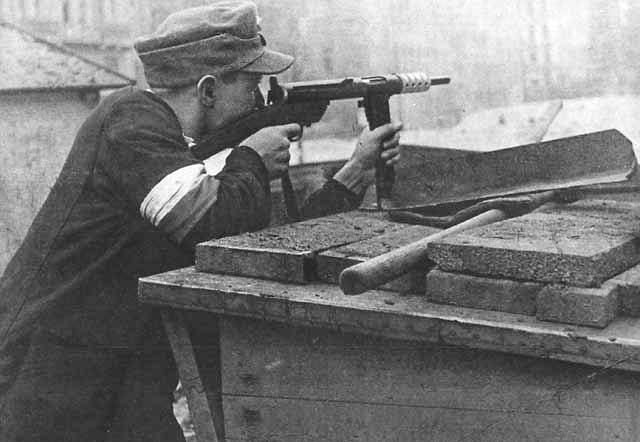
Polish soldier firing a Błyskawica during the Warsaw Uprising

The final assembly took place in a workshop officially producing metal fence nets in Warsaw at Grzybów Square, and the guns were tested in a cellar. After the tests of a prototype series of five pistols, the KeDyw ordered 1000, and later an additional 300. Until July 1944 and the start of Operation Tempest roughly 600 pieces were built in Warsaw. During the Warsaw Uprising an additional 40 were built. Around 740 were manufactured in total. It is also possible that the Błyskawica was also produced in small quantities outside of Warsaw.

== Bibliography ==
- Erenfeicht, Leszek (December 2023). "Pistolety maszynowe II wojny światowej. Cz. II Alianci" [Submachine guns of World War II. Part II - the Allied]. Strzał.pl – pro libertate (in Polish). Vol. special issue 4. pp. 82–84. ISSN 2719-4736.
- Kazimierz Satora, Produkcja Uzbrojenia w Polskim Ruch Oporu 1939–45, Warsaw 1985
- Kazimierz Satora, Podziemne zbrojownie polskie 1939–1944, Dom Wydawniczy Bellona, Warsaw 2001

== See also ==
- Bechowiec-1
- Choroszmanów submachine gun
- KIS (weapon)
