= KIS (weapon) =

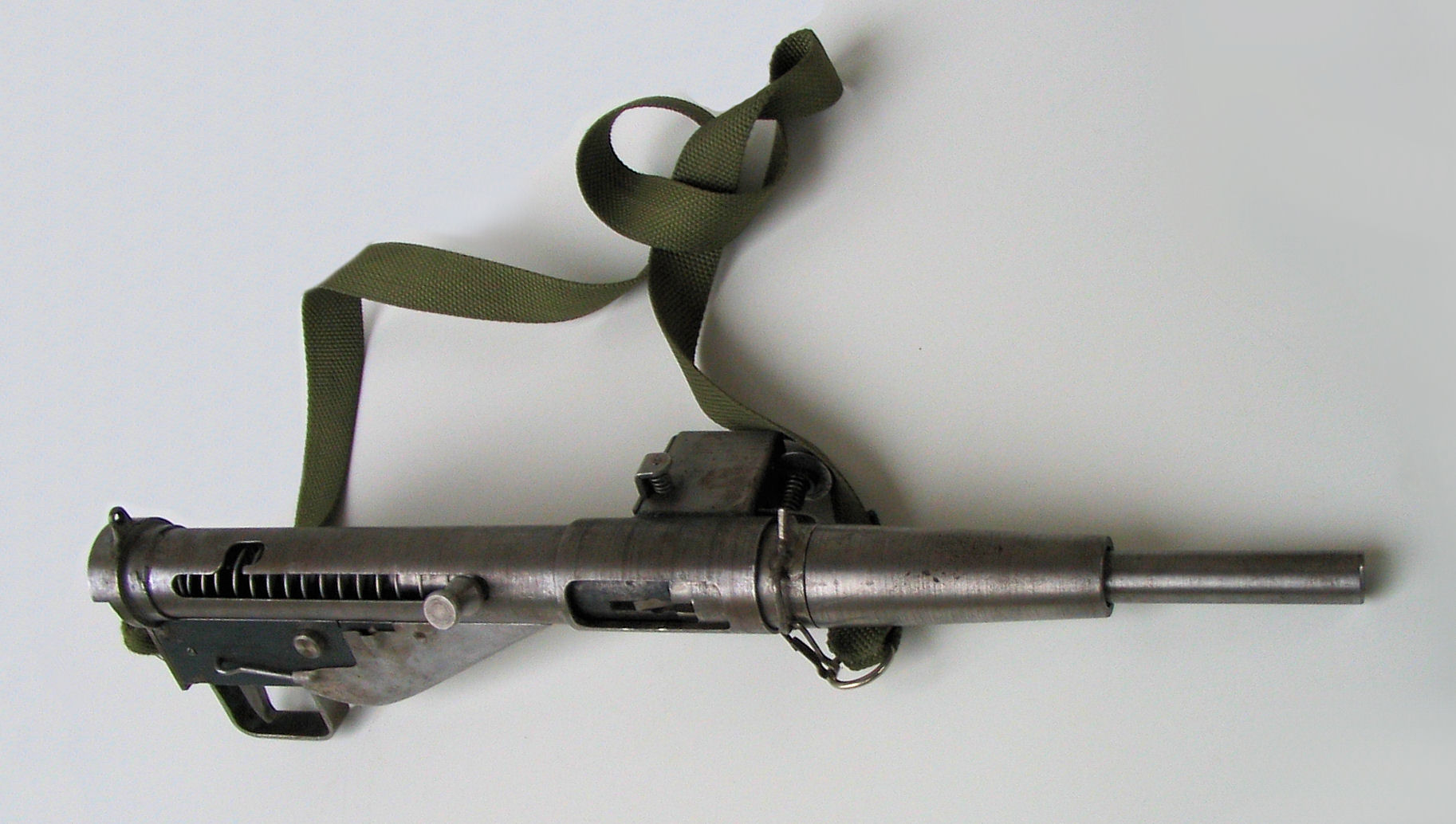
- KIS submachine gun
- Type: Submachine gun
- Place of origin: Poland

Service history
- In service: 1943 to 1945
- Used by: Poland
- Wars: WW2

Production history
- Designed: 1943
- Produced: 1943 to 1944
- No. built: ~37–38
- Variants: None

Specifications
- Length: 600 mm
- Barrel length: 220 mm
- Cartridge: 9×19mm Parabellum
- Caliber: 9 mm
- Action: Open-Bolt Blowback
- Muzzle velocity: 335.36 m/s (1,100 ft/s)
- Effective firing range: 100 m
- Feed system: 32 round box magazine

KIS was the name of a Polish submachine gun from the time of the Second World War. It was designed and manufactured by engineers in Jan Piwnik's "Ponury" ("Grim") partisan group that was operating in Holy Cross Mountains region.

The weapon was patterned after Sten, retaining its left-side magazine. Main differences were a longer barrel, with conical rear part, and lack of stock – the gun had a pistol grip instead.

== See also ==
- Bechowiec-1
- Błyskawica submachine gun
- Choroszmanów submachine gun

== Bibliography ==
- Kazimierz Satora - "Produkcja Uzbrojenia w Polskim Ruch Oporu 1939-45", Warszawa 1985
- Kazimierz Satora "Podziemne zbrojownie polskie 1939-1944", Dom Wydawniczy Bellona, Warszawa 2001
