= Type 64 submachine gun =

Chinese silenced submachine gun

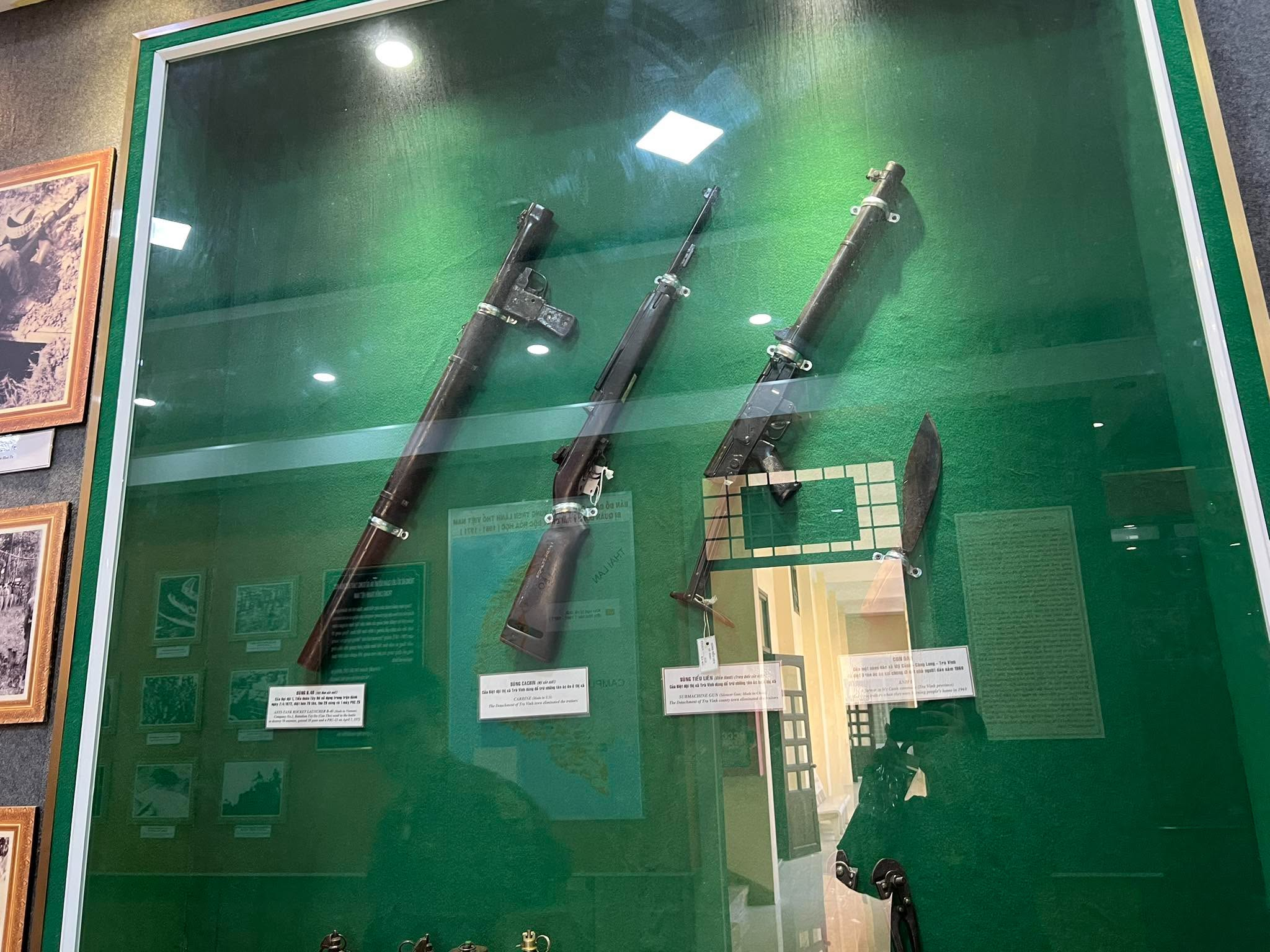
- Type 64 submachine gun (third one from the left) displayed at 9th Military Region museum
- Type: Submachine gun
- Place of origin: China

Service history
- Used by: See Operators
- Wars: Vietnam War; Sino-Vietnamese War

Production history
- Manufacturer: State factory 66

Specifications
- Mass: 3.4kg, with empty 20-rounds magazine
- Length: 630mm Stock folded 860mm Stock open
- Barrel length: 245mm
- Cartridge: 7.62×25mm Type 64
- Caliber: 7.62mm
- Action: Blowback, open bolt
- Rate of fire: 1,000rpm (with subsonic cartridge); 1,300rpm (with non-dedicated cartridges)
- Muzzle velocity: 290～305 m/s
- Maximum firing range: 150-200m
- Feed system: 20/30-round box magazine
- Sights: Iron

The Type 64 (Chinese: 1964年式衝鋒槍; pinyin: 1964 Niánshì Chōngfēng Qiāng; lit. '1964Year Type Submachine Gun') is a submachine gun of Chinese origin. Designed for silent operations, the Type 64 has an integral suppressor making the weapon considerably quieter. The weapon is a magazine-fed selective-fire submachine gun using an open-bolt, blowback action, chambered for 7.62×25mm Type 64 (A special subsonic version of the Chinese 7.62x25 Type-51 7.62×25mm Tokarev round).

This was one of the few Chinese-made Cold War small arms that were not based on any existing Soviet small arms.

== History ==
While the Type 64 has been used in the PLA, it was eventually replaced in service by the Type 85 submachine gun. The weapon was developed together with the Type 64 suppressed pistol for special forces missions.

Some Type 64s were exported for the North Vietnamese military during the Vietnam War. It was used in the Sino-Vietnamese War in 1979 by Chinese troops.

The Type 64 was replaced in the PLA with the Type 85 submachine gun.

== Development ==
The Type 64 was designed from the beginning to be a suppressed weapon, unlike many other suppressed firearms that are simply modified versions of standard production guns. An amalgam of many designs, the gun features the bolt of a PPS submachine gun and the trigger group of a ZB vz. 26, both of which are grafted onto the receiver of an AKS-47. The rate of fire is at 1,000. to 1,300 RPM. This was reported in 1971 by the Small Arms Systems Lab of the US Army Weapons Command Research and Engineering Directorate.

The safety/fire selector lever is based on the Type 56 assault rifle. An additional trigger safety is present, which is used to prevent the user from accidentally firing the weapon. While standard 7.62mm Tokarev ammo can be used, it will increase the rate of having the integrated suppressor wear off. It is best used with 7.62×25mm Type 64 ammo since they are subsonic. The Type 64 can use 20 or 30-round magazines.

A flip-up rear sight is available, set for ranges from 100 to 200 meters.

Chinese sources reported that the Type 64's noise level is at 84 decibels when using subsonic ammo. The tests conducted by the Small Arms Systems in 1971 reported a claim of 150 decibels.

== Operators ==
- China: Formerly used by the PLA during the Sino-Vietnamese War.
- North Vietnam: Small numbers issued to armed police with the designation K64.
