= WG66 =

Maschinenpistolen WG 66
- Type: Submachine gun
- Place of origin: East Germany

Production history
- Designed: 1966

Specifications
- Cartridge: 7.62×25mm Tokarev
- Caliber: 7.62mm
- Action: Blowback

The WG66 is a submachine gun of East German origin. The weapon is chambered in the 7.62×25mm Tokarev round.
