= Sten =

British submachine gun series

Sten submachine gun
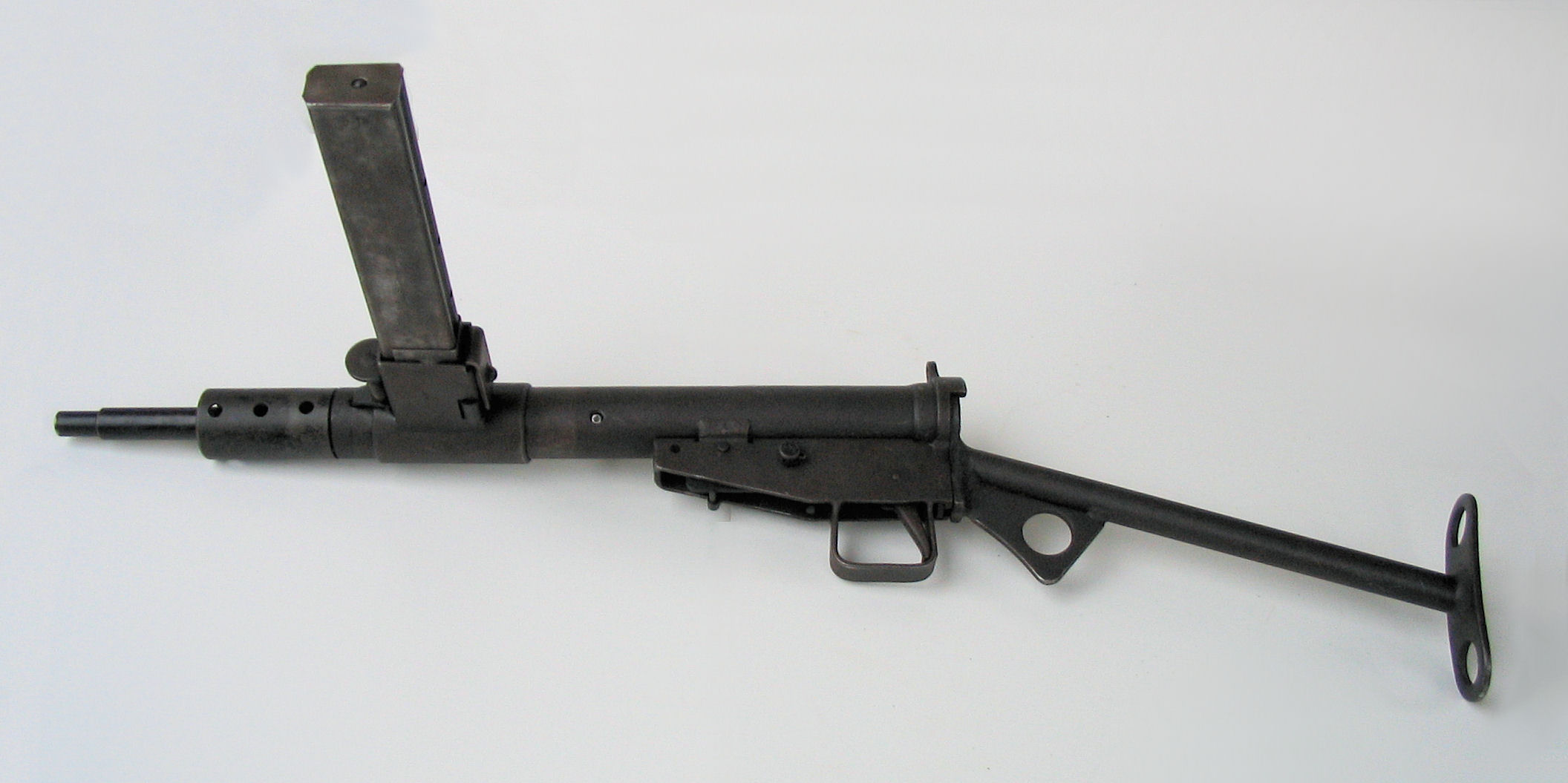
- A Sten MK II, this one is missing the trigger housing cover and has the late-WW2 stock design
- Type: Fucile mitragliatore
- Place of origin: United Kingdom

Service history
- In service: 1941–1960s (United Kingdom); 1941–present (other countries)
- Used by: See Users
- Wars: World War II; Second Sino-Japanese War; Chinese Civil War; Indonesian National Revolution; First Indochina War; Indo-Pakistan Wars; 1948 Arab–Israeli War; Malayan Emergency; Korean War; Mau Mau Uprising; Algerian War; Suez Crisis; 1958 Lebanon crisis; Cuban Revolution; Annexation of Goa; Portuguese Colonial War; Sino-Indian War; Vietnam War; Indonesia–Malaysia confrontation; Laotian Civil War; Greek Civil War; Bangladesh Liberation War; Lebanese Civil War; Angolan Civil War; Rhodesian Bush War; Turkish invasion of Cyprus; IRA Border Campaign; The Troubles; Punjab insurgency; Maluku sectarian conflict; Iraq War; Syrian Civil War

Production history
- Designer: Major Reginald V. Shepherd; Harold J. Turpin
- Designed: 1940
- Manufacturer: Royal Small Arms Factory Enfield; BSA; ROF Fazakerley; ROF Maltby; ROF Theale; Berkshire; Lines Brothers Ltd; Long Branch Arsenal, Canada (Note: plus numerous sub-contractors making individual parts); Various underground resistance group factories
- Unit cost: £2/6s in 1942 (equivalent to £94 in 2025)
- Produced: 1941–1945 (version dependent)
- No. built: 3.7–4.6 million (all variants, depending on source)
- Variants: Mk. I, II, IIS, III, IV, V, VI

Specifications
- Mass: 3.2 kg (7.1 lb) (Mk. II)
- Length: 762 mm (30.0 in)
- Barrel length: 196 mm (7.7 in)
- Cartridge: 9×19mm Parabellum
- Action: Blowback-operated, open bolt
- Rate of fire: version dependent; c. 500–600 round/min
- Muzzle velocity: 365 m/s (1,198 ft/s) 305 m/s (1,001 ft/s) (suppressed models)
- Effective firing range: 60 m (66 yd)
- Feed system: 32-round detachable box magazine
- Sights: fixed peep rear, post front

The STEN (or Sten gun) is a British submachine gun chambered in 9×19mm which was used extensively by British and Commonwealth forces throughout World War II and during the Korean War. The Sten paired a simple design with a low production cost, facilitating mass production to meet the demand for submachine guns. As well as equipping regular units, the Sten was distributed to resistance groups within occupied Europe. Its simple design made it an effective insurgency weapon for resistance groups.

The Sten is a select fire, blowback-operated weapon with a side-mounted magazine. Sten is an acronym, derived from the names of the weapon's chief designers: Major Reginald V. Shepherd and Harold J. Turpin, and "En" for the Enfield factory. (Note: Colonel Shepherd discussing how it was named when he received an Award from the Board of the Royal Commission Awards to Inventors. Lord Cohen: "Why was it called the Sten?" Colonel Shepard: "It was called the Sten by the then Director General of Artillery. The S was from my name, the T from Mr. Turpin who was my draughtsman and who did a very large amount of the design and the EN was for England. That is the origin of the name, for which I accept no responsibility." In the official history of the Royal Ordnance Factories, ST is for Shepard and Turpin and EN is for Enfield Some sources give J.J.Turpin rather than Harold) Around four million Stens in various versions were made in the 1940s, making it the second most produced submachine gun of the Second World War, after the Soviet PPSh-41. The Sten served as the basis for the Sterling submachine gun, which replaced the Sten in British service from 1953 to 1994.

== History ==
The Sten emerged while Britain was engaged in the Battle of Britain, facing invasion by Germany. The army was forced to replace weapons lost during the evacuation from Dunkirk while expanding their arsenal at the same time. After the start of the war and to 1941 (and even later), the British purchased all the Thompson submachine guns they could from the United States, but these did not meet demand, and Thompsons were expensive, the M1928 costing $200 in 1939 (and still $70 in 1942), whereas a Sten would turn out to cost only $11. American entry into the war at the end of 1941 placed an even bigger demand on the facilities making Thompsons. In order to rapidly equip a sufficient fighting force to counter the Axis threat, the Royal Small Arms Factory, Enfield, was commissioned to produce an alternative.

The credited designers were Major R. V. Shepherd, OBE, Inspector of Armaments in the Ministry of Supply Design Department at The Royal Arsenal, Woolwich, (later Assistant Chief Superintendent at the Armaments Design Department) and Harold John Turpin, Senior Draughtsman of the Design Department of the Royal Small Arms Factory (RSAF), Enfield. Shepherd had been recalled to service after having retired and spending some time at the Birmingham Small Arms Company (BSA).

The Sten shared design features, such as its side-mounted magazine configuration, with the Lanchester submachine gun being produced at the same time for the Royal Navy and Royal Air Force, which was a copy of the German MP28. In terms of manufacture, the Lanchester was entirely different, being made of high-quality materials with pre-war fit and finish, in stark contrast to the Sten's austere execution. The Lanchester and Sten magazines were even interchangeable (though the Lanchester's magazine was longer with a 50-round capacity, compared to the Sten's 32.)

The Sten used simple stamped metal components and minor welding, which required minimal machining and manufacturing. Much of the production could be performed by small workshops, with the firearms assembled at the Enfield site. Over the period of manufacture, the Sten design was further simplified: the most basic model, the Mark III, could be produced from five man-hours of work. Some of the cheapest versions were made from only 47 different parts (out of 47 components, only the barrel and bolt were machined). The Mark I was a more finely finished weapon with a wooden foregrip and handle; later versions were generally more spartan, although the final version, the Mark V, which was produced after the threat of invasion had died down, was produced to a higher standard.

The Sten underwent various design improvements over the course of the war. For example, the Mark 4 cocking handle and corresponding hole drilled in the receiver were created to lock the bolt in the closed position to reduce the likelihood of unintentional discharges inherent in the design. Most changes to the production process were more subtle, designed to give greater ease of manufacture and increased reliability, and the potentially great differences in build quality contributed to the Sten's reputation as being an unreliable weapon. Historian John Warwicker claimed "Exaggerated reports about the unreliability [of the Sten] were usually related to the quality of manufacture. Don Handscombe and his comrades in the Thundersley Patrol of the Auxiliary Units rated them more reliable than the Thompson SMG." Sten guns of late 1942 and beyond were highly effective weapons, though complaints of accidental discharge continued throughout the war.

The Sten was replaced by the Sterling submachine gun from 1953 and was gradually withdrawn from British service in the 1960s. Other Commonwealth nations followed suit, either by creating their own replacements or adopting foreign designs.

== Design ==
The Sten is a blowback-operated submachine gun firing from an open bolt with a fixed firing pin on the face of the bolt. This means the bolt remains to the rear when the weapon is cocked and on pulling the trigger the bolt moves forward from spring pressure, stripping the round from the magazine, chambering it and firing the weapon all in the same movement. There is no breech locking mechanism; the rearward movement of the bolt caused by the recoil impulse is arrested only by the mainspring and the bolt's inertia.

The German MP40, Soviet PPSh-41, and US M3 submachine gun, among others, use the same operating mechanisms and design philosophy of the Sten, namely their low cost and ease of manufacture. Though the MP40 was also built largely for this purpose, Otto Skorzeny went on record saying that he preferred the Sten because it required less raw material to produce and performed better under adverse combat conditions. The effect of putting lightweight automatic weaponry into the hands of soldiers greatly increased the short-range firepower of the infantry, especially when the main infantry weapon was a bolt-action rifle capable of only around 15 rounds per minute. The open-bolt firing mechanism, short barrel and use of pistol ammunition severely restricted accuracy and stopping power, with an effective range of only around 60 m (200 ft), compared to 500 m (1,600 ft) for the Lee–Enfield rifle.

Stoppages could occur for poor maintenance, while others were particular to the Sten. Carbon build-up on the face of the breech or debris in the bolt raceway could cause a failure to fire, while a dirty chamber could cause a failure to feed. Firing the Sten by grasping the magazine with the supporting hand, contrary to instruction, tended to wear the magazine catch, altering the angle of feed and causing a failure to feed; the correct method of holding the weapon was as with a rifle, the left hand cradling the fore piece.

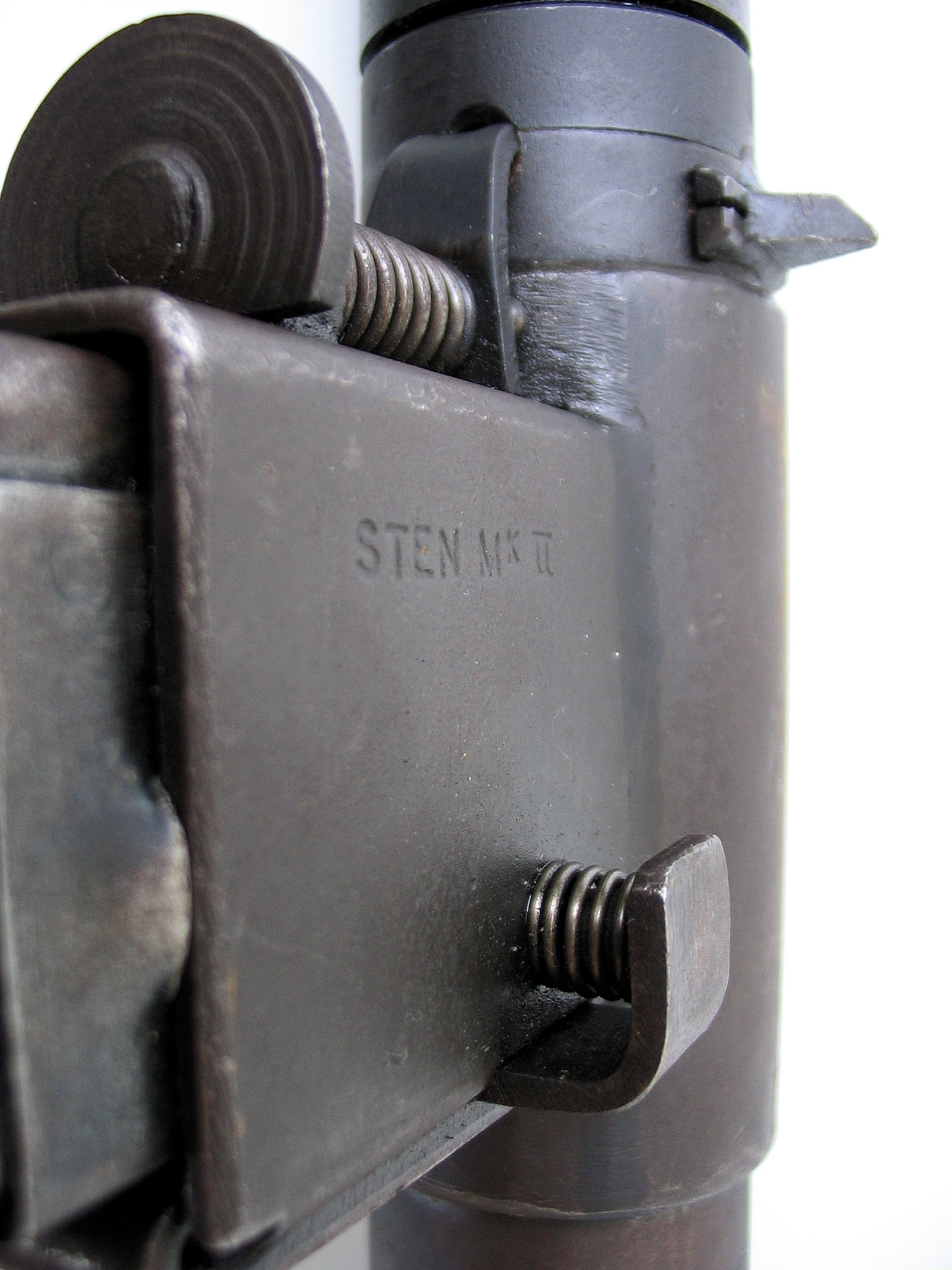
Sten Mk II magazine insert

The Sten's magazine, like the Lanchesters, derived from the MP28, originally to use its magazines, which incorporated the faults of the MP28 magazine. The magazine has two columns of 9 mm cartridges in a staggered arrangement, merging at the top to form a column. While other contemporary staggered magazines, such as the Thompson, feed from the left and right side alternately (known as "double column, double feed"), the Sten magazine requires the cartridges gradually to merge at the top of the magazine to form a column ("double column, single feed"). Dirt or foreign matter in this taper area can cause feed malfunctions. The walls of the magazine lip have to endure the full stresses of the rounds being pushed in by the spring. This, along with rough handling, can result in deformation of the magazine lips (which requires a precise 8° feed angle to operate), resulting in misfeeding and a failure to fire. (Note: Modern 9 mm magazines, such as those used by the Sterling submachine gun, are curved and feed both sides to avoid this problem.) If a Sten failed to feed due to jammed cartridges in the magazine, standard practice to clear it was to remove the magazine from the gun, tap the base of the magazine against the knee, re-insert the magazine, then re-cock the weapon and fire again as normal. To facilitate easier loading when attempting to push the cartridges down to insert the next one, a magazine filler tool was developed and formed part of the weapon's kit. The slot on the side of the body where the cocking knob runs was also a target of criticism, as the long opening can allow foreign objects to enter. On the other hand, a beneficial side-effect of the Sten's minimalist design is that it will fire without any lubrication.

The selector is a push button type that actuates a sear disconnector to enable firing in semi-automatic. When firing in this mode, the bolt moves rearward tripping on the sear disconnector downwards requiring the user to release the trigger to fire the weapon again. When firing in full automatic, the selector slightly pivots and moves the sear disconnector sideways enabling the trigger to hold the sear in the firing position without interference of the bolt movement. The open bolt design combined with cheap manufacture and rudimentary safety devices also means the weapon is prone to accidental discharges, which proved hazardous. A simple safety can be engaged while the bolt is in the rearwards (cocked) position. However, if a loaded Sten with the bolt in the cocked position is dropped, or the butt is knocked against the ground, the bolt can move far enough forward to pick up a round (but not far enough to be engaged by the trigger mechanism) and the spring pressure can be enough to chamber and fire the round. The Mk. IV's cocking handle is designed to prevent this by enabling the bolt to be locked in its forward position, immobilising it. Wear and manufacturing tolerances can render these safety devices ineffective. Though the Sten was somewhat prone to malfunction, in the hands of a well-trained soldier, who knew how to avoid the Sten's failings, they were less of a liability as otherwise may be suggested. According to Leroy Thompson, "Troops usually made the conscious choice to keep the Sten with a magazine in place, based on the assumption that they might need it quickly. It might, then, be argued that more troops were saved by having their Sten ready when an enemy was suddenly encountered than were injured by accident. The Sten was more dangerous to its users than most infantry weapons, but all weapons are dangerous".

== Variants ==
Sten guns were produced in several basic marks, of which nearly half of the total produced consisted of the Mark II variant. Approximately 4.5 million Stens were produced during the Second World War.

=== Mark I ===
The first ever Mk I Sten gun (number 'T-40/1' indicating its originator Harold Turpin, the year 1940 and the serial number "1") was handmade by Turpin at the Philco Radio works at Perivale, Middlesex during December 1940/January 1941 in 36 days. This weapon is held by the historical weapons collection of the British Army's Infantry and Small Arms School Corps in Warminster, Wiltshire.

The Mark I has a conical flash hider and fine finish. The bolt on the Mark I rotates downwards to hold it open for safety, similar to that of a bolt-action rifle (the bolt on Mark II+ variants rotates upwards). The handguard, vertical forward grip and some of the stock are made of wood. The stock consists of a small tube, similar to the Mark II Canadian. The barrel shroud has vent holes. The magazine insert is fixed to the receiver with screws (unlike the later found on Mark II+ variants that can be rotated 90 degrees for stowage). A design choice that is only present on the Mark I is that the vertical forward grip can be rotated forward to make it easier to stow. 100,000 Mark I Stens were made before production was moved to the Mark II. Mark I Stens in German possession were designated MP 748(e), the 'e' standing for englisch.

=== Mark I* ===
The Mark I* (pronounced "Mark-One-Star") variant was designed to simplify production of the Mark I; the handguard, vertical forward grip, vent holes, wooden furniture and conical flash hider were removed with this variant. It was the first variant to come with a tube stock.

=== Mark II ===
The Mark II is the most common mainstream variant, with two million units produced. The flash eliminator and the folding handle (the grip) of the Mk I are omitted. A removable barrel is provided which projects 3 inches (76 mm) beyond the barrel sleeve. It uses a tube stock. Also, a special catch allows the magazine to be slid partly out of the magazine housing and the housing rotated 90 degrees counter-clockwise (from the operator's perspective), together covering the ejection opening and allowing the weapon and magazine both to lie flat on its side.

The barrel sleeve is shorter and rather than having small holes on the top, it has three sets of three holes equally spaced on the shroud. To allow a soldier to hold a Sten by the hot barrel sleeve with the supporting hand, an insulating lace-on leather sleeve guard was sometimes issued. (Note: The barrel sleeve was generally considered the proper place for the supporting hand, as holding the weapon by its magazine could sometimes initiate a feed malfunction. However, the metal barrel sleeve heats rapidly after only a few bursts.) Sten Mk IIs in German possession were designated MP 749(e). Some Mk IIs had wooden stocks. The Spz-kr assault rifle, a rudimentary German design made in the closing stages of the war, uses the receiver and components from the Sten Mk II, and the MP 3008 was made as a cheap copy.

- Overall length: 762 mm (30.0 in)
- Barrel length: 197 mm (7.8 in)
- Weight: 3.2 kg (7.1 lb)

=== Mark II (Canadian) ===
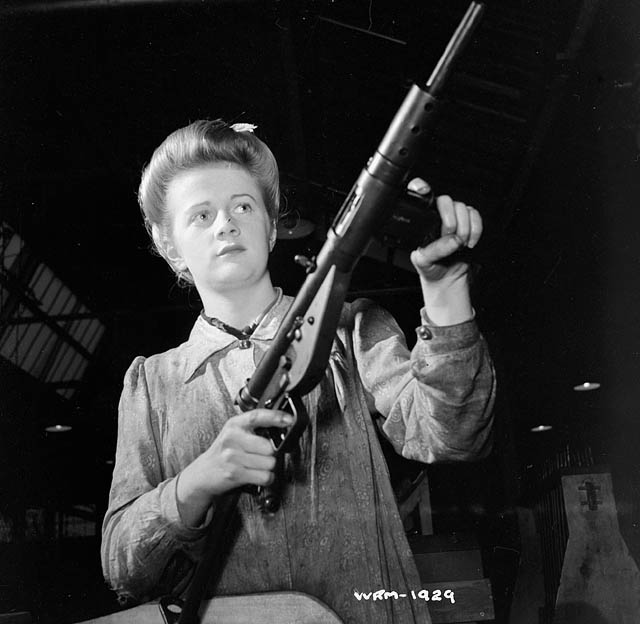
Worker posing with a Sten Mk II in the factory on 26 May 1942

During World War II, a variation of the Sten gun was produced at the Long Branch Arsenal plant in Long Branch, Ontario (now Lakeview, an area of Mississauga, Peel Region). This is very similar to the regular Mark II, with a different stock ('skeleton' type instead of strut type). It was first used in combat in the Dieppe Raid in 1942.

The Mark II was made in China as a copy known as the M38. The Chinese M38s were made in an automatic-only configuration, unlike the standard Mark II. The M38 was made in 9×19mm and 7.62×25mm Tokarev variants.

- Overall length: 896 mm (35.3 in)
- Barrel length: 198 mm (7.8 in)
- Weight: 3.8 kg (8.4 lb)

=== Mark III ===
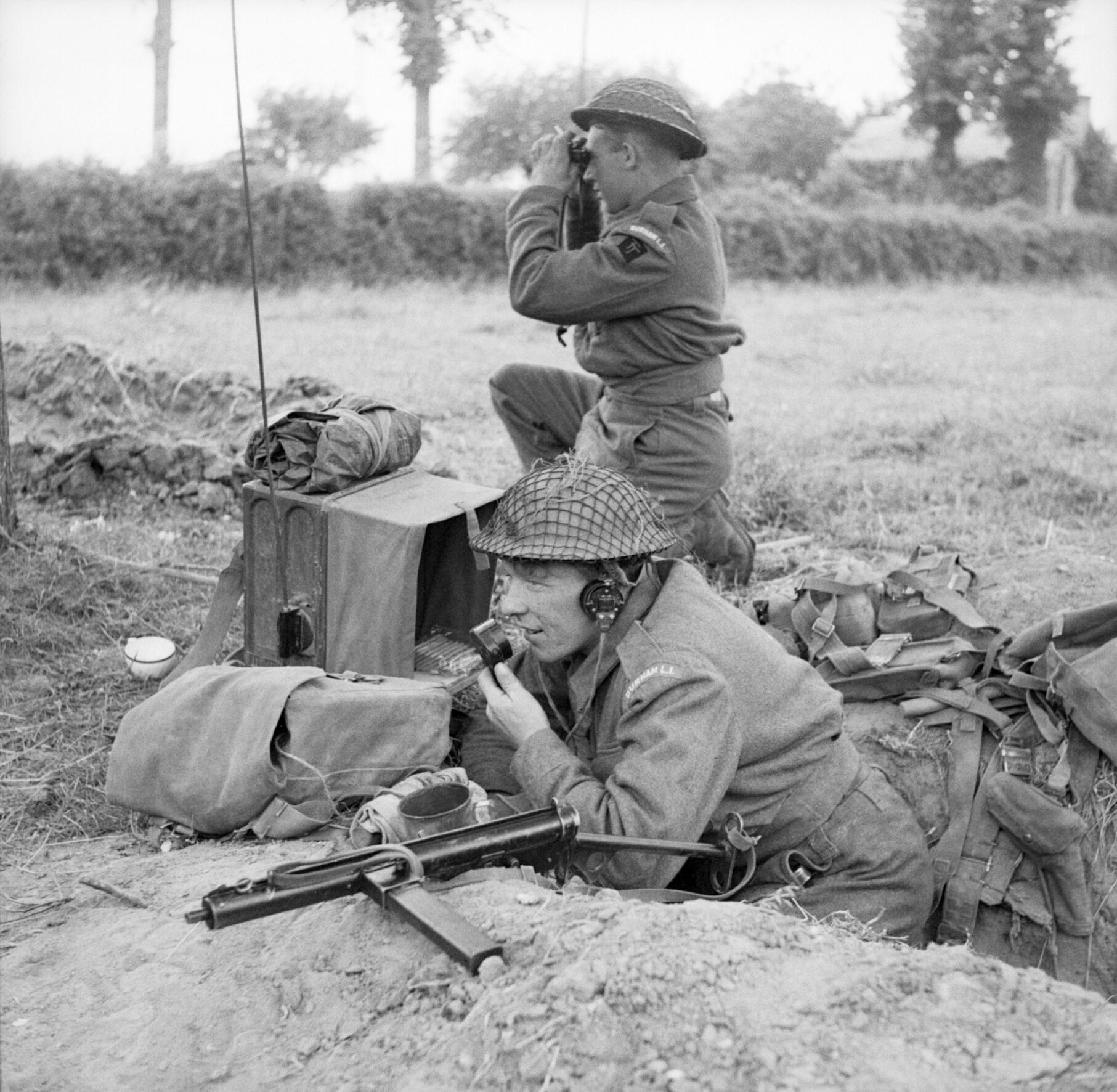
Radio operator of Durham Light Infantry with a Sten Mk III, France 1944

After the Mark II, this was the most produced variant of the Sten, manufactured in Canada alongside the United Kingdom, with Lines Bros Ltd being the largest producer. The Mark III is made of 48 parts, compared to the Mark II's 69, but the Mark II remained more commonplace for logistical reasons – parts between the two are not interchangeable. Though slightly lighter, the magazine well is fixed in place, and the barrel cannot be removed, meaning if it was damaged the weapon had to be scrapped. Combined with the fact the Mark III was more prone to failure than the Mark II, production of the weapon ceased in September 1943. Unlike the Mark II, the receiver, ejection port, and barrel shroud are unified, leading to them being extended further up the barrel. Captured Sten Mk IIIs in German possession were designated MP 750(e). A total of 876,886 Mark IIIs were produced.

=== Mark V ===
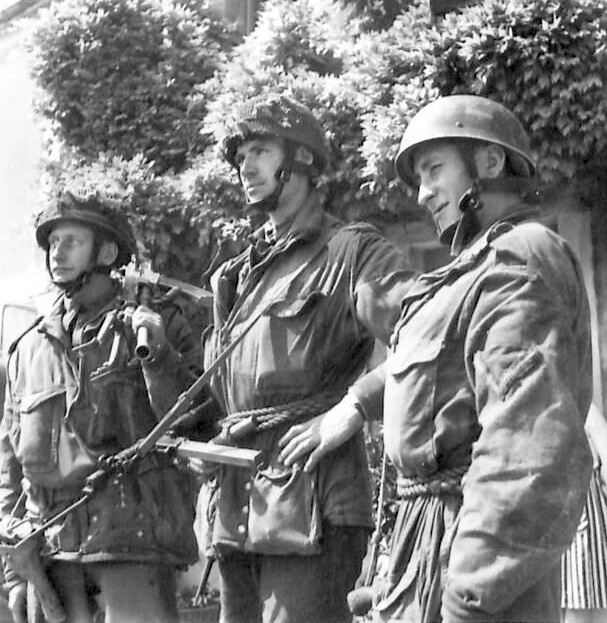
Men of 6th Airlanding Brigade with a Sten Mark V in Normandy, June 1944

The Mark V adds a bayonet mount, and a wooden pistol grip and stock. There is a No. 4 Lee–Enfield front sight and the weapon is of better quality manufacture and finish than the Mk II and Mk III.

Another variant of the Mk V has a swivel stock and rear sight mirror intended for firing around corners in urban warfare, similar to the Krummlauf developed by the Germans for the StG 44.

=== Suppressed models ===
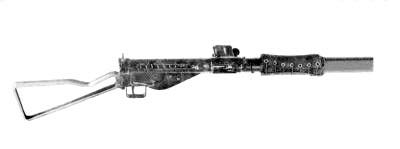
Sten Mk II(S)

Mk II(S) and Mk VI models incorporate an integral suppressor and have a lower muzzle velocity than the others due to a ported barrel intended to reduce velocity to below the speed of sound – 305 m/s (1,001 ft/s) – without needing special ammunition. The suppressor heats up rapidly when the weapon is fired, and a canvas cover was laced around the suppressor for protection for the firer's supporting hand.

Mk II(S)
Designed in 1943, the Mk II(S) ("Special-Purpose") is an integrally suppressed version of the Mk II. Captured examples of the Sten Mk II(S) in German service were designated MP 751(e).
Mk VI
The Mk VI is a suppressed version of the Mk V. The Mk VI is the heaviest version due to the added weight of the suppressor, as well as using a wooden pistol grip and stock.

The suppressed models were produced at the request of the Special Operations Executive (SOE) for use in clandestine operations in occupied Europe, starting with the Mk II(S) in 1943. Owing to their tendency to overheat, they were fired in short bursts or single shots. Some guns were even changed to semi-automatic only.

In addition to its use in the European theatre, the Mk II(S) saw service with clandestine units in the Southwest Pacific Area (SWPA) such as the Services Reconnaissance Department and the SOE's Force 136 on operations against the Imperial Japanese Army. The Sten Mk II(S) was used by the Operation Jaywick party during their raid into Japanese-occupied Singapore Harbour.

The Sten Mk II(S) also saw service with the Special Air Service Regiment during the Vietnam War.

=== Experimental models ===
Mark II (wooden stock model)
This is a standard Sten Mk.II with a wooden stock attached in place of the wireframe steel stock used with Mk.IIs. This wooden stock model was never put into service, likely due to the cost of producing it.
Mark II (Rosciszewski model)
This is a Sten Mk.II modified by Antoni Rosciszewski of Small Arms Ltd. The magazine is mechanically operated by the breech block movement. The trigger is split into two sections, with the upper part of the trigger offering full-auto fire and a lower part offering single shots. It is very complex in design and was never fielded.
Mark II (pistol grip model)
This is a Sten Mk.II with a wireframe pistol grip, intended for use with paratroopers. It is compact but predictably uncomfortable to fire.
Model T42
This is a Sten Mk.II modified with a five-inch barrel and folding stock, as well as a conventional pistol grip and redesigned trigger guard. It was dubbed the "T42" in prototype phases, but never entered service.
Mark IV
The Mark IV is a smaller variant of the Sten, comparable in size to a pistol, and never left the prototype stage. It uses a conical flash hider, a shortened barrel, and a much lighter stock.
Rofsten
Developed at the Royal Ordnance Factory in Fazakerley (ROF Fazakerley), the Rofsten is an odd Sten prototype with a redesigned magazine feed, ergonomic pistol grip, selector switch and cocking system. The weapon is cocked by pulling the small ring above the stock. A large flash eliminator is fixed onto the barrel, and a No.5 bayonet can be fixed. It is made to a very high quality standard and has an increased rate of fire (around 900 rounds per minute). The Rofsten was made in 1944 as a single prototype and ROF wanted to submit it to trials the next year. Despite better quality there were numerous reliability problems due to the much higher rate of fire. The budget cuts prevented the modifications and this version never got beyond the prototype stage.
Small Arms Ltd. Model 2
Designed by Antoni Rosciszewski of Small Arms Ltd, this weapon uses a magazine with an internal endless belt feed holding 50 rounds of ammunition. The weapon also has a two-stage trigger for automatic and semi-automatic fire.
Viper Mk I

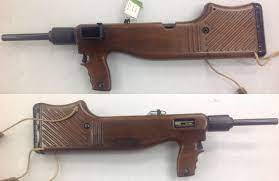
Viper Mk I

This version simplifies the weapon, including the trigger mechanism and barrel which is welded to the gun making it not removable. The weapon is also fully automatic and there is no semi-automatic function on the gun. It was made in the United Kingdom after World War II and was a prototype weapon never used as it was deemed impractical. It was designed for military policemen in post-war Germany to be fired one-handed. Only one was ever made and it is currently held at the Royal Armouries Museum in Leeds, United Kingdom.

=== Foreign-built variants and post-1945 derivatives ===
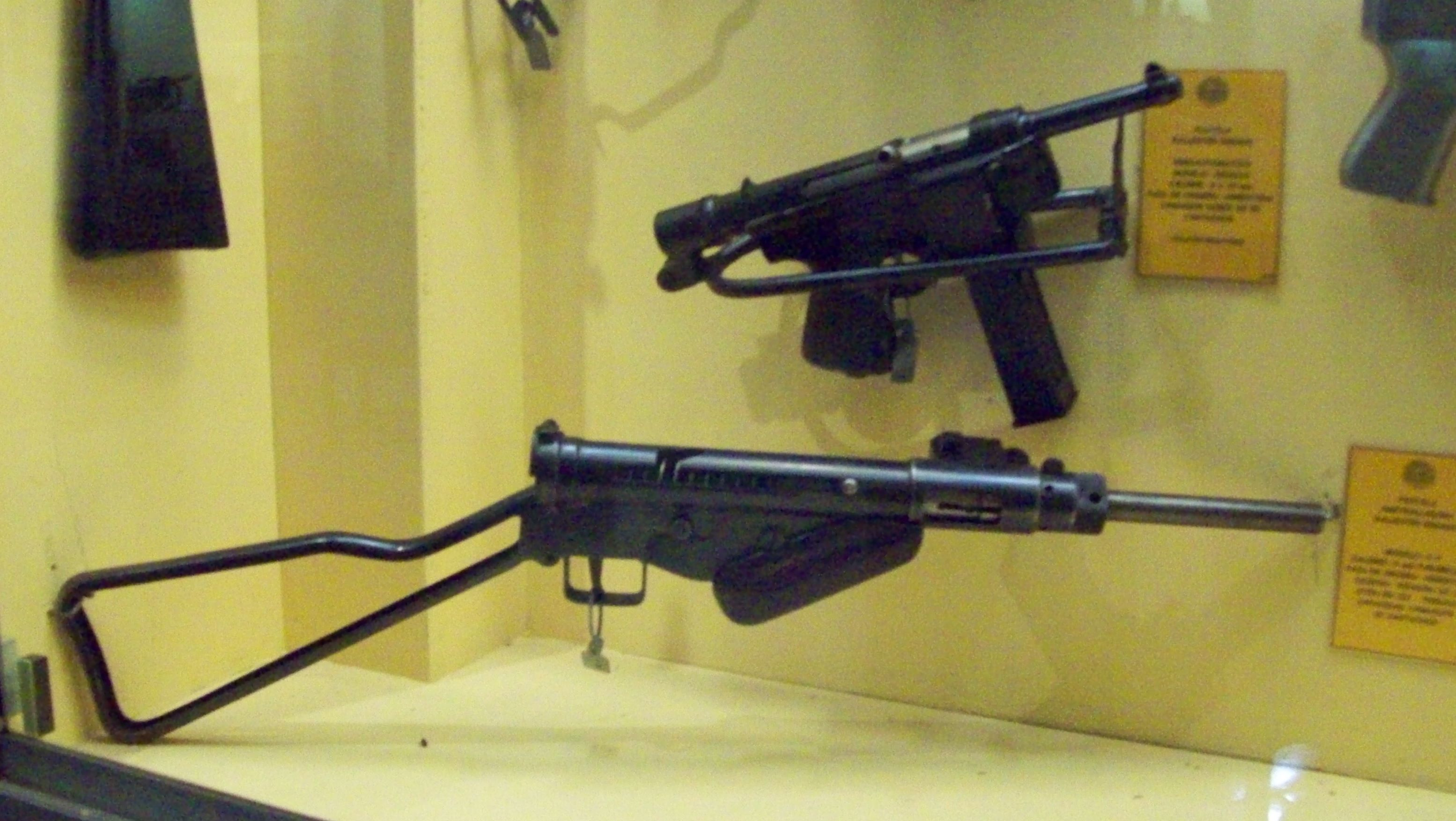
Modelo C.4 Sten gun

Argentina
Sten MkIIs were licence-copied in Argentina by Pistola Hispano Argentino and can be recognised with a wooden handguard in front of the trigger group. It was known as the Modelo C.4. Another variant comes with a pistol grip section based on the Ballester–Molina .45 pistol. The Halcon ML-57 is a simpler derivative of the Sten gun of Argentine origin that is fed from a vertically inserted magazine.

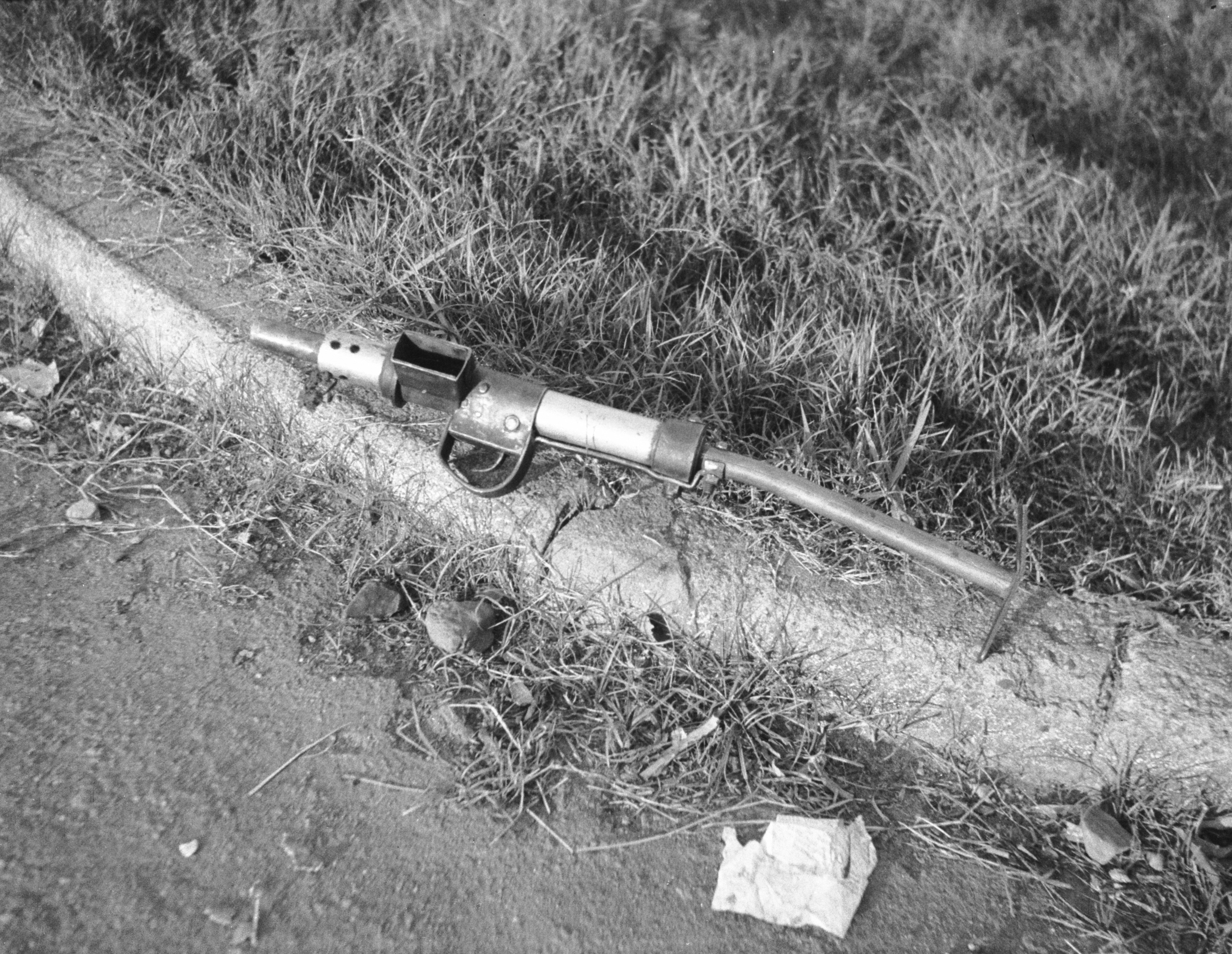
Crude example of locally-made Indonesian Sten gun

Indonesia
Indigenous copies were produced at the former Demakijo (alternatively Demak Ijo) sugar mill in Sleman Regency and other factories throughout Yogyakarta in 1946–1948 for the Indonesian Army during the Indonesian National Revolution. The indigenous Sten has the trigger group closer to the magazine insert. Another variant of the indigenous copies was named Pren Gun, from the portmanteau of Pranggono (the designer) and Sten gun. Pren guns were made at a factory in Tirtomoyo, Wonogiri Regency for the Surakarta-based Tentara Genie Pelajar (Student Soldiers Combat Engineers). The design is similar to the Sten Mk II with wire stock and additional flash hider.
Israel
Copies of the Sten Mk II and Sten Mk V were clandestinely manufactured in Tel Aviv and on various kibbutzim in 1945–1948 for use with Haganah and other Jewish paramilitary groups.
France
The French Gnome et Rhône R5 Sten, manufactured in Limoges by the motorbike and aeroplane engine manufacturer Gnome et Rhône (SNECMA), comes with a shorter barrel, a forward pistol grip and distinctive wooden stock, although its greatest improvement is a sliding bolt safety, added to secure the bolt in its forward position. Dimensions were converted to the metric system, so the parts are not interchangeable with the Sten. From an initial target of 10,000 to 20,000 copies, 8,100 R5s were produced between late 1944 and November 1945. They were delivered to the former FFI units of the French Liberation Army and some were used during the Western Allied invasion of Germany and the First Indochina War.

Other variants were made and tested by MAC (Manufacture d'armes de Châtellerault) shortly after WWII with an unusual stock shape that proved detrimental to the user's aim. Internally it is basically a Sten gun but has two triggers for semi/full auto, a grip safety and a foregrip that uses MP40 magazines. Another has a folding stock with a folding magazine insert. The trigger mechanism is complicated and unusual. Neither of these prototypes had any kind of success and MAC closed its doors not long after their conception.

Norway
The Norwegian resistance, under the leadership of Bror With, created a large number of Sten guns from scratch, mainly to equip members of the underground army Milorg. In his autobiography, Norwegian resistance fighter Max Manus frequently mentions the Sten as one of the weapons his groups of commandos and resistance fighters used effectively against German troops.
Denmark
Several groups in the Danish resistance movement manufactured Sten guns for their own use. BOPA produced around 200 in a bicycle repair shop on Gammel Køge landevej (Old Køge road), south of Copenhagen. Holger Danske produced about 150 in workshops in Copenhagen, while employees of the construction company Monberg & Thorsen built approximately 200–300 in what is now the municipality of Gladsaxe (a suburb of Copenhagen) for use by Holger Danske and others. The resistance groups 'Frit Danmark' and 'Ringen' also built significant numbers of Stens.

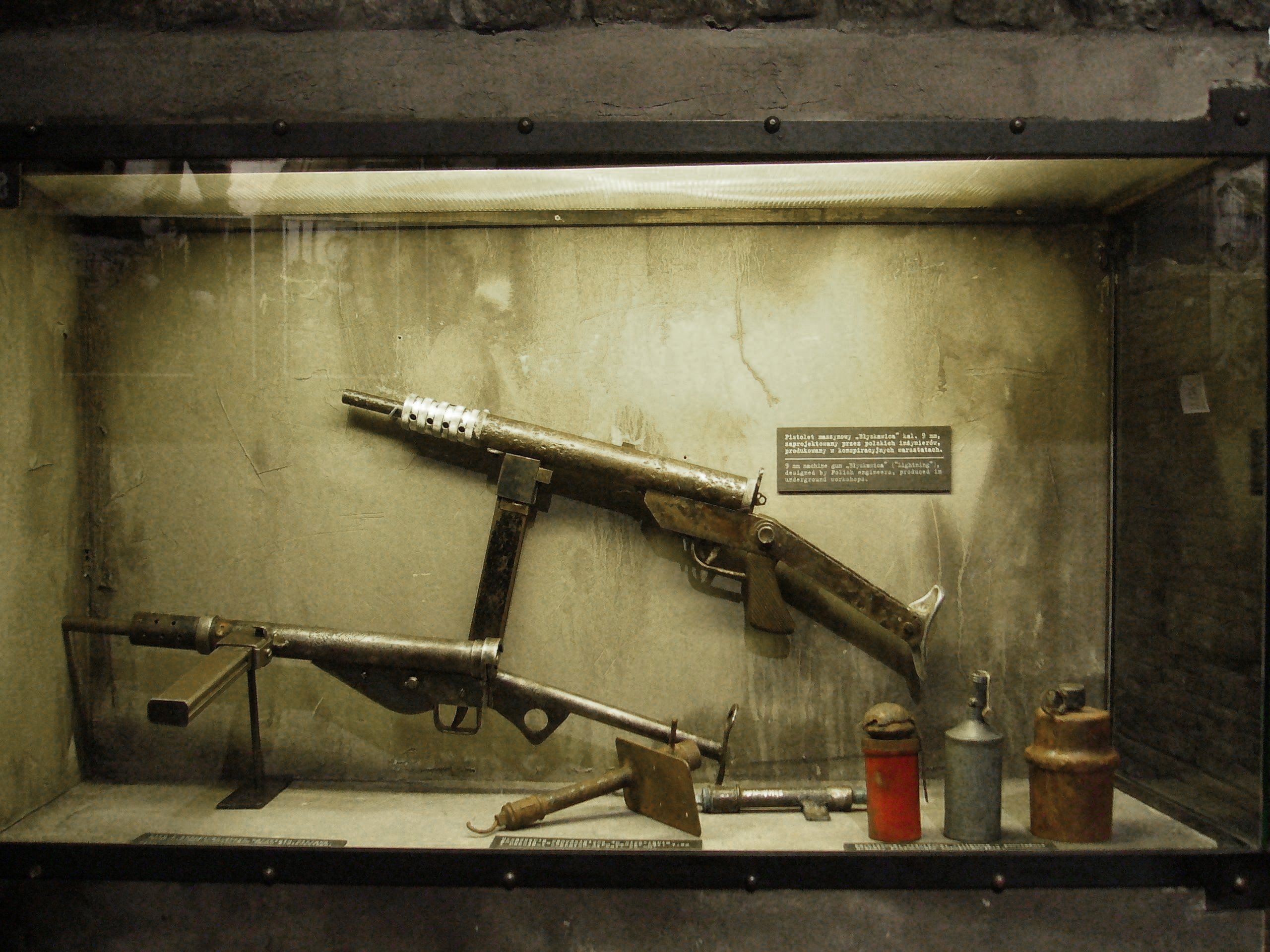
Błyskawica and Polish Sten gun on display in the Warsaw Uprising Museum

Poland
From 1942 and 1944, approximately 11,000 Sten Mk IIs were delivered to the Armia Krajowa by the SOE and Cichociemni. Because of the simplicity of the design, local production of Sten variants was started in at least 23 underground workshops in Poland, with some producing copies of the Mark II, and others developing their own designs, namely the Polski Sten, the KIS, and the more significantly altered Błyskawica. Polski Stens made in Warsaw under the command of Ryszard Białostocki were built from parts made in official factories, with the main body of the design being made from hydraulic cylinders produced for hospital equipment. To help disguise their origin, the Polski Stens were marked in English.
Belgium

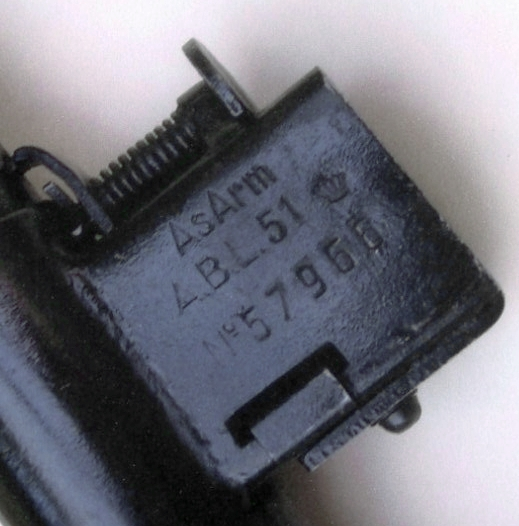
Details underneath of the magazine well stamping on a Belgian Sten gun

A little known version of the MkII Sten was built in Belgium by l'arsenale militare belga (the Belgian military arsenal). The magazine well was stamped AsArm (the manufacturer), ABL (for Armée Belge / Belgisch Leger), the Belgian Royal Crown, and a serial number of typically five figures with no letter prefix. It is believed the Belgian built Mk II Stens remained in ABL service until the early 1980s, particularly with helicopter-borne forces. Some of the weapons had a "Parkerised" finish. After the Second World War the Belgian Army was mainly equipped with a mixture of British and American submachine guns. The army, wanting to replace them with a modern and preferably native design, tested various designs with the Vigneron M2 and licence-produced FN Uzi being selected. The Imperia is an improved Sten with a fire selector and retractable stock.
Germany
In late 1944, Mauser began to produce copies of the Mk II Sten for sabotage purposes. The series was referred to as the Gerät Potsdam (Potsdam Device) and almost 10,000 weapons were made. By 1945, Germany was seeking a cheaper replacement for the MP40 submachine gun to issue to the Volkssturm. Mauser produced a modified Sten, named the MP 3008. The main difference is that the magazine attaches below the weapon. Altogether, roughly 10,000 were produced in early 1945, just before the end of World War II.
Australia
The Mark I Austen submachine gun ("Australian Sten") was an Australian design, derived from the Sten and manufactured by Diecasters Ltd of Melbourne and W. T. Carmichael Ltd of Sydney. It externally resembles the Sten but has twin pistol grips and folding stock resembling those of the German MP40. Australian and NZ troops however preferred the Owen gun which was more reliable and robust in jungle warfare. A Mk II version was also produced which is of different appearance and which makes more use of die-cast components. 20,000 Austens were made during the war and the Austen was replaced by the F1 submachine gun in the 1960s.
United States
A short-lived American invention developed in the 1980s, the Sputter Gun was designed to circumvent the law that defined a machine gun as something that fired multiple rounds with one pull of the trigger. The Sputter Gun has no trigger, but fires continuously after loading and the pulling back of its bolt, firing until it runs out of ammunition. The gun was very short lived as the ATF quickly reclassified it. During the 1970s–1980s, International Ordnance of San Antonio, Texas, United States released the MP2 machine pistol. It was intended as a more compact, simpler derivative of the British Sten gun to be used in urban guerrilla actions, to be manufactured cheaply and/or in less-than-well-equipped workshops and distributed to "friendly" undercover forces. Much like the FP-45 Liberator pistol of World War II, it could be discarded during an escape with no substantial loss for the force's arsenal. The MP2 is a blowback-operated weapon that fires from an open bolt with an extremely high rate of fire.
Guatemala
The SM-9 is a machine pistol of Guatemalan origin and manufactured by Cellini-Dunn IMG, Military Research Corp and Wildfire Munitions as the SM-90. It is blowback operated, firing from an open bolt and can use magazines from Ingram MAC-10 submachine guns inserted into a similar foregrip that can be rotated 45 and 90 degrees for left/right handed operators. The layout of the receiver is somewhat simpler than that of a Sten with its internal components light in weight enabling a very high rate of fire of 1200 rpm. Its forward pistol grip can hold a spare magazine as well as handling the weapon when firing.
Croatia
The Pleter submachine gun was created in 1991 when the break-up of Yugoslavia in the midst of emerging war left the newly formed Republic of Croatia with small number of military firearms. Since the embargo prevented the Croatian military from legally buying them on open market (so they were mostly obtained on the world black market, but with significantly higher price and sometimes of questionable quality), to fulfill the immediate need for arms, they tried to resort to quick and simple locally made designs. Despite having a vertical magazine well (designed to accept a 32-round staggered-feed direct copy of the UZI magazine, rather than original single-feed Sten-type magazine), analogies with the Sten include a striking resemblance in the barrel assembly and in the bolt and recoil spring. In addition, this gun also fires from an open bolt, and is further simplified by removing fire mode selector or any safety.
Canada
SMG International in Canada manufactured reproductions of the Sten in six variants. They made copies of the Sten's Mk I*, Mk II and Mk III, a "New Zealand Sten" (a Mk II/III Sten hybrid, with sights and a fixed magazine housing similar to the Mk III), then branched out into "hypothetical" Sten-guns with a "Rotary Magazine Sten" (a Mk II Sten with a drum magazine attached below the weapon and wooden horizontal forward grip on the left side of the weapon) and the "FRT Gun" (a long barrel Sten with a wooden or Mk I* type butt stock, a drum magazine attached below the weapon and sliding ramp rear sights). These last two are obviously not Sten reproductions, especially if they include a drum magazine. The "Rotary Magazine Sten" is a vertically fed Sten which uses a modified Sten bolt, which can use either PPSh-41 drum magazines or stick magazines. The FRT gun is essentially a Suomi KP/-31 that uses a Sten trigger mechanism. All SaskSten guns fire from an open bolt.
Soviet Union
A less known experimental variant, the Volkov-Chukhmatov uses a vertical tandem magazine.
Taiwan
During the 1950s in the 39th year of the Republic of China, the 44th Arsenal developed a prototype Sten with a folding dadao blade known as the Type 90. This example uses a rear pistol grip and an inline tube stock with folding blade catch and extended barrel shroud.
Vietnam

The Vietnamese Arsenal copied the Sten gun during the First Indochina War, and the Viet Cong made them during the Vietnam War.

=== Conversions ===
The Sten Mk.II can be converted to take 7.62×25mm ammunition by changing the barrel, magazine, magazine housing and bolt. Some of them were imported to the US before 1968. These Mk.IIs were made by Long Branch as part of a Nationalist Chinese contract.

While all types of 7.62×25mm ammo can be used, those made in the former Czechoslovakia are made for small arms that can handle high velocity ammo Anyone using the converted Stens are not advised to use Czechoslovak-made ammo.

== Service ==
The Sten, especially the Mark II, tended to attract affection and loathing in equal measure. Its peculiar appearance when compared to other firearms of the era, combined with sometimes questionable reliability made it unpopular with some front-line troops. It gained nicknames such as "Plumber's Nightmare", "Plumber's Abortion", or "Stench Gun". The Sten's advantage was its ease of mass-production manufacture in a time of shortage during a major conflict.

Made by a variety of manufacturers, often with subcontracted parts, some early Sten guns were made poorly and/or not to specification, and could malfunction in operation, sometimes in combat. The double-column, single-feed magazine copied from the German MP28 was never completely satisfactory, and hasty manufacturing processes often exacerbated the misfeed problems inherent in the design. A common statement heard from British forces at the time was that the Sten was made "by Marks and Spencer out of Woolworth." British and Commonwealth forces in the early years of the war often extensively test-fired their weapons in training to weed out bad examples; a last-minute issue of newly manufactured Stens prior to going into action was not welcomed.

The MK II and III Stens were regarded by many soldiers as very temperamental, and could accidentally discharge if dropped or even laid on the ground whilst the gun was cocked. Others would fire full-automatic when placed on 'single', or fire single shots when placed on 'automatic'. This was particularly true of early Stens using bronze bolts, where the sear projection underneath the bolt could wear down more easily than ones made of case-hardened steel.

Stens could jam at inopportune moments. One of the more notable instances of this was the assassination of SS–Obergruppenführer Reinhard Heydrich on 27 May 1942, when Czechoslovak Warrant Officer Jozef Gabčík wanted to fire his Sten point blank at Heydrich, only to have it misfire. His comrade Jan Kubiš then hastily tossed a grenade, which mortally wounded Heydrich. There are other accounts of the Sten's unreliability, some of them true, some exaggerated and some apocryphal. France manufactured (well-made) Sten copies postwar into the early 1950s, evidently believing in the basic reliability and durability of the design.

A well-maintained (and properly functioning) Sten gun was a devastating close-range weapon for sections previously armed only with bolt-action rifles. In addition to regular British and Commonwealth military service, Stens were air-dropped in quantity to resistance fighters and partisans throughout occupied Europe. Due to their slim profile and ease of disassembly/reassembly, they were good for concealment and guerrilla warfare. Wrapping the barrel in wet rags would delay undesirable overheating of the barrel. Guerrilla fighters in Europe became adept at repairing, modifying and eventually scratch-building clones of the Sten (over 2,000 Stens and about 500 of the similar Błyskawica SMGs were manufactured in occupied Poland).

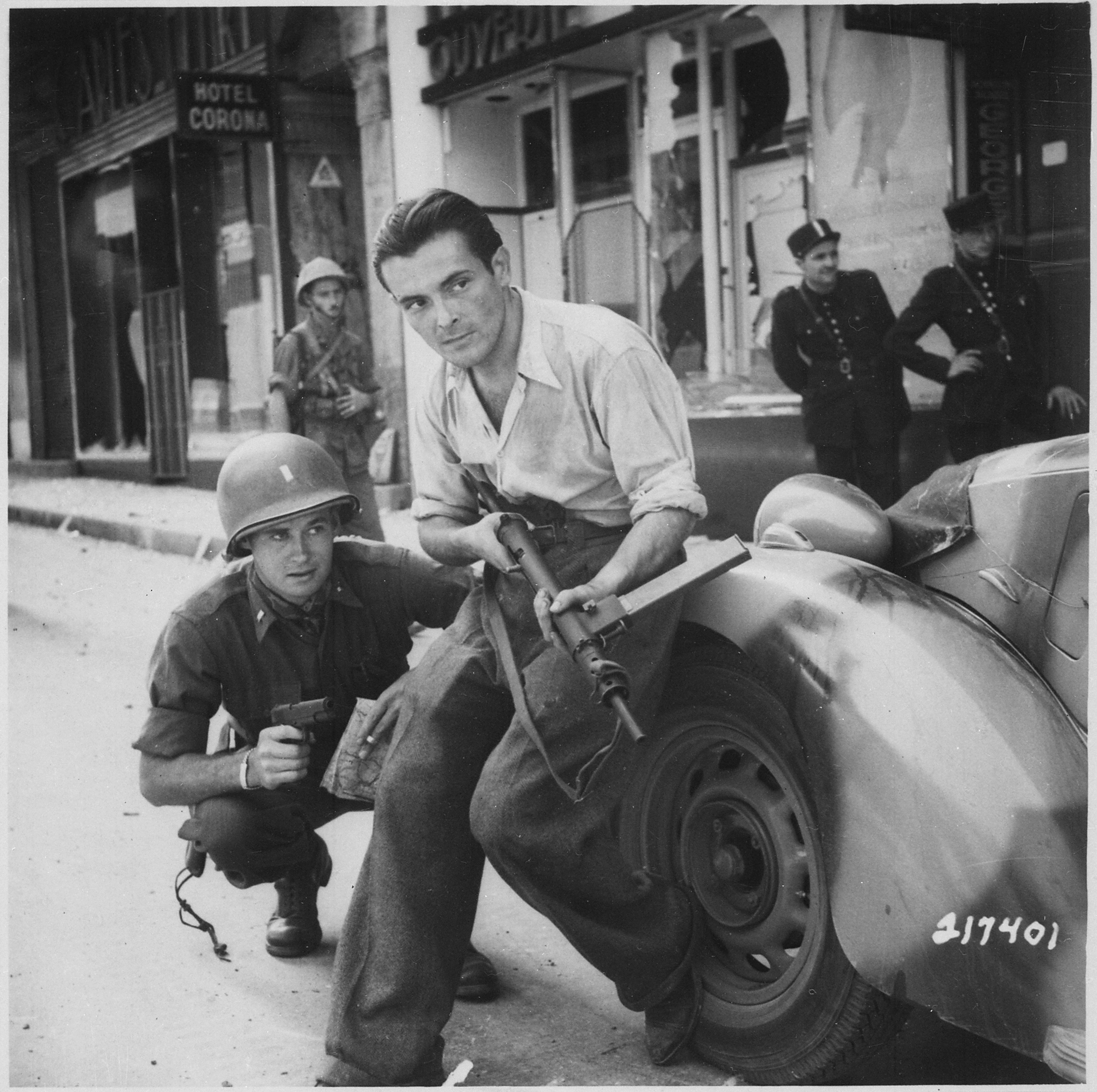
A French partisan armed with a Sten Mk II SMG, France, 1944

Canadian infantry battalions in northwest Europe retained spare Sten guns for special missions and the Canadian Army reported a surplus of the weapons in 1944.

The Sten was one of the few weapons that the State of Israel could produce domestically during the 1948 Arab–Israeli War. Even before the declaration of the State of Israel, the Yishuv had been producing Stens for the Haganah; after the declaration, Israel continued making Stens for IDF use. The opposing side also used (mostly British-made) Stens, particularly the irregular and semi-regular Arab Liberation Army.

In 1954, the British Army began using "L numbers" to type-classify weapons and related stores; while Sten guns then in-service were not redesignated, L numbers were applied to later drill purpose variants of the Mk II, Mk III, and Mk V (L50A1 Drill Purpose Machine Carbine, L51A1 Drill Purpose Machine Carbine, and L52A1 Drill Purpose Machine Carbine respectively). It was around this time that the Sten began to be replaced by the Sterling submachine gun; Canada also phased out the Sten, replacing it with the domestically produced C1 version of the Sterling.

One of the last times the Sten was used in combat during British service was with the RUC during the IRA border campaign of 1956–1962. In foreign service, the Sten was used in combat at least as recently as the Indo-Pakistani War of 1971.

Sten guns were widely used by guerrilla fighters during the 1971 Bangladesh Liberation War. In 1975, President Sheikh Mujibur Rahman and his family members were assassinated using Sten guns.

A number of suppressed Stens were in limited use by the US Special Forces during the Vietnam War, including c. 1971, by the United States Army Rangers.

A 9mm Sten was used by the assassins in the 1975 assassination of Sheikh Mujibur Rahman in a military coup, which was the most common submachine gun model in service with the Bangladesh Army during the mid-1970s.

In 1984, Indian prime minister Indira Gandhi was assassinated by two of her bodyguards, one of whom fired the entire magazine (30 rounds) of his Sten at point-blank range, of which 27 hit her.

In the Second Sino-Japanese War and the Chinese Civil War, both nationalists and communist Chinese forces used the Sten. Some Stens were converted by the communists to 7.62×25mm by using the magazine housing from a PPS to accept curved PPS magazines. British, Canadian, and Chinese Stens were seen in the hands of the communists during the Korean and Vietnam Wars.

The Finnish Army acquired moderate numbers of Stens in the late 1950s, mainly Mk. III versions. Refurbishment at the Kuopio Arsenal included bluing of the arms. Stens in Finnish service saw limited usage by conscripts (notably combat swimmers) and were mostly stockpiled for use in a future mobilisation.

During the Zapatista movement in 1994, some Zapatista soldiers were armed with Sten guns.

== Users ==
- Albania: Used by the Albanian National Liberation Army during World War II. The weapons were supplied by the British SOE.
- Argentina: Modelo C.4..
- Australia: Locally produced during World War II.
- Bangladesh: Extensively used during 1971 war.
- Botswana
- Belgium
- British Hong Kong
- Canada: Locally produced during World War II.
- Central African Republic: Central African Republic Police had 10 Stens in 1963
- Ceylon
- (Democratic Republic of the Congo) Republic of the Congo (Léopoldville)
  - Katanga
- Cuba: Fidel Castro praised the Canadian Sten gun in his 1958 interview with Erik Durschmied
- Cyprus
- People's Republic of China: Most used by communist forces had their Stens converted to 7.62x25 calibre.
- Republic of China: Locally produced copies designated M38
- Czechoslovakia: Used by Czechoslovak troops for Operation Anthropoid, the assassination of Reinhard Heydrich. The gun jammed and failed to fire.
- Denmark: Used by the Danish resistance movements like BOPA and Holger Danske. Locally produced.
- Egypt
- Finland: 76 115 MK 2s and 3s bought in 1957–1958; used until replaced by assault rifles.
- France: Used during World War II by the Free French forces, the French Resistance and some captured from the Resistance were used by the pro-German Milice française. Still used after World War II.
- Greece
- Grenada
- India
- Indonesia: Used by republican Forces.
- Israel: Used in the 1947–1949 Palestine war and the Suez Crisis.
- Italy: Sten guns were supplied to the Italian resistance movement by the SOE, along with the United Defense M42 submachine gun supplied by the OSS during the Italian Campaign. These guns, along with the Berretta M38A, were used by the Italian partisans until the end of World War II.
- Empire of Japan
- Jordan: Arab Legion
- Kenya: Used by the regular police paramilitary GSU, army paratroopers; replaced by G3A3/4, M4 and HK416.
- Kingdom of Laos: Used by the Royal Lao Army and the CIA-sponsored irregular Special Guerrilla Groups during the Laotian Civil War.
- Libya
- Luxembourg
- Malaysia: Used by Royal Malaysia Police, Malaysian Army, Royal Malaysian Navy and Malaysian Prison Department in 1950s to 1970s.
- Malta
- Myanmar: Retired.
- Nepal: Still in service in 2006.
- Netherlands
- Nazi Germany: Used some captured Stens during World War II, under the designations MP 748 (e) for the Mark I to MP 751 (e) for the Mark V. From late 1944, they produced an almost identical copy of the Mk II, the Gerät Potsdam (Potsdam Device) and a modified version, the MP 3008, as last ditch weapons.
- New Zealand
- Nigeria
- North Korea: Canadian Mk II and Chinese M38 copies.
- Norway: Used by the Norwegian resistance from 1940–1945. The guns came to the resistance groups by air (supply drops). Used by the Army after the war.
- North Vietnam: Việt Minh and Viet Cong
- Pakistan
- Philippines: Used by the Recognized Guerrilla Units during World War II.
- Poland: Used by Polish Armed Forces in the West and main resistance army in occupied Poland, the Armia Krajowa (Home Army). The majority of the resistance's Stens were dropped to Poland in SOE supply drops, but some of the Polish Stens were produced in the occupied country. Polish engineers also designed their own Sten version, the Błyskawica submachine gun. After the war, it was used by many anti-communist partisan groups (cursed soldiers).
- Portugal: Known as m/43.
- Rhodesia
- Sierra Leone
- South Africa
  - South West Africa: Used by SWAPOL during the South African Border War.
- South Vietnam
- Thailand
- Tibet: The Tibetan Army purchased 168 guns in 1950.
- Turkey
- United Kingdom
- United States: Suppressed Stens used during the Vietnam War by American special forces.
- West Germany: Formerly used by West Berlin Police.
- Yugoslavia: Used by the Yugoslav Partisans and Chetniks. Also used after the war.

=== Non-state groups ===
- Front de libération du Québec: Stolen from Canadian armouries.
- FNLA
- The Provisional IRA and Official IRA
- The Ulster Volunteer Force and Ulster Freedom Fighters
- Balcombe Street Gang
- The Angry Brigade
- Some were supplied to the Bulgarian Communist Party during WWII
- Mau Mau guerrillas used captured Stens.
