= Type 85 submachine gun =

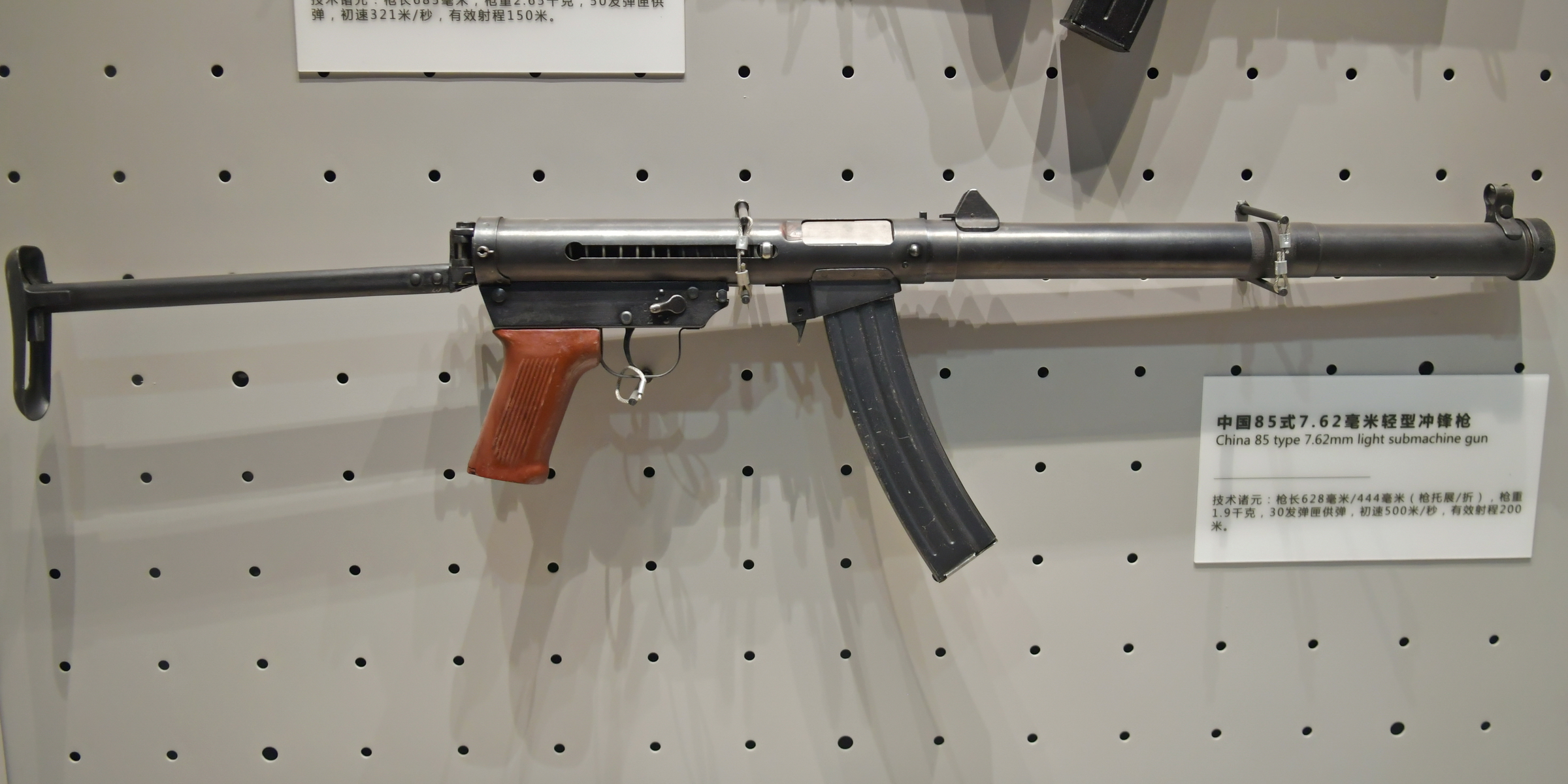
- Type 85 on display.
- Type: Submachine gun
- Place of origin: China

Service history
- In service: 1985–present
- Used by: See Users

Production history
- Designed: 1979-1983
- Manufacturer: China North Industries Corporation
- Variants: See Variants

Specifications
- Mass: 1.9 kg
- Cartridge: 7.62×25 mm Tokarev (Type 85)
- Action: Blowback-operated, open bolt
- Feed system: 30-round box magazine
- Sights: Rear sight notch

The Type 85 (Chinese: 1985年式衝鋒槍; pinyin: 1985 Niánshì Chōngfēng Qiāng; lit. '1985 Year Type Submachine Gun') is a Chinese submachine gun, developed during the early 1980s as a less expensive replacement for the Type 79 submachine gun. The weapon's silenced version was also developed to replace the Type 64 submachine guns in service with the People's Liberation Army (PLA).

== History ==
Design of the Type 85 started between 1979 and 1983 and it was classified in 1985. Design work was done by the 208th Research Institute of China Ordnance Industry. Type 85's design is simplistic and straight-forward, and ease-to-manufacture. During development, there was criticism of its appearance, and it earned nicknames like "toy gun" or "the master work of plumber" in the Chinese military. The Type 85 was eventually adopted to start replacing the Type 64 in PLA service.

The development of the Type 85 was planned to eventually replace the Type 79 submachine gun in PLA service. Type 79's service was rather disappointing due to its reliability issue. The development plan to replace the Type 79 was initiated in 1979.

In January 1980, two prototypes were made for firearms testing. In 1981, trials were conducted with the weapons being tested in combat trails with single and full auto modes used. Initial feedback suggests that while handling was good, there are improvements that could be made. Multiple state factories were reportedly competing for the order in 1983, with the design finalized around 1984. Problems encountered in early trials included excessive recoil and trigger sensitivity.

With problems ironed out, the Type 85 was certified by the military in 1985. It gradually replaced Type 79 in the Chinese military and received positive feedback due to its high reliability and simplicity in maintenance.

Like Type 79, Type 85 was eventually phased out of service and put into the hands of Chinese police force. While the Type 85 was popular in the Chinese military, it was widely detested in the police force. This was largely due to its overly simplified open-bolt design which attributed to Type 85's poor first-shot accuracy.

== Design ==
The Type 85 submachine gun is a simple blowback weapon that fires from an open bolt. The weapon's mechanism was partially based on the Type 64. Parts made for the regular and suppressed version are interchangeable, except for the barrels. The safety and fire mode selector lever is located at the right side of the trigger unit, above the trigger guard. The Type 85 allows for single shots and full automatic fire, which is indicated in the receiver 0, 1 and 2.

The weapon is optimized for special 7.62×25mm (Type 64) ammunition with heavy, subsonic bullets, but can also fire standard 7.62mm Type 51/7.62×25mm TT ammunition (with increased loudness). There was a 5.8mm version being researched for potential adoption, but it was never adopted into service. The Type 85 SMG is fed using the same 30-round box magazines as the Type 64 SMG. There is also a steel shoulder stock, which folds to the right side.

== Variants ==
=== Type 85 suppressed ===
A version of the Type 85 with an integral suppressor. The barrel and sleeve were changed.

== Users ==
- China: Known to be used by Chinese special forces units and Armed Police.
- Comoros: With Comoran soldiers involved in the 2008 invasion of Anjouan.
- Tanzania: With Tanzanian soldiers involved in the 2008 invasion of Anjouan.
- Bangladesh: Used by Law Enforcements. most notably Rapid Action Battalion

=== Non-State Actors ===
- Liberation Tigers of Tamil Eelam: LTTE Black Tigers commandos used suppressed Type 85s during the attack on Anuradhapura Air Force Base.
