= M56 submachine gun =

Crvena Zastava Automat M56
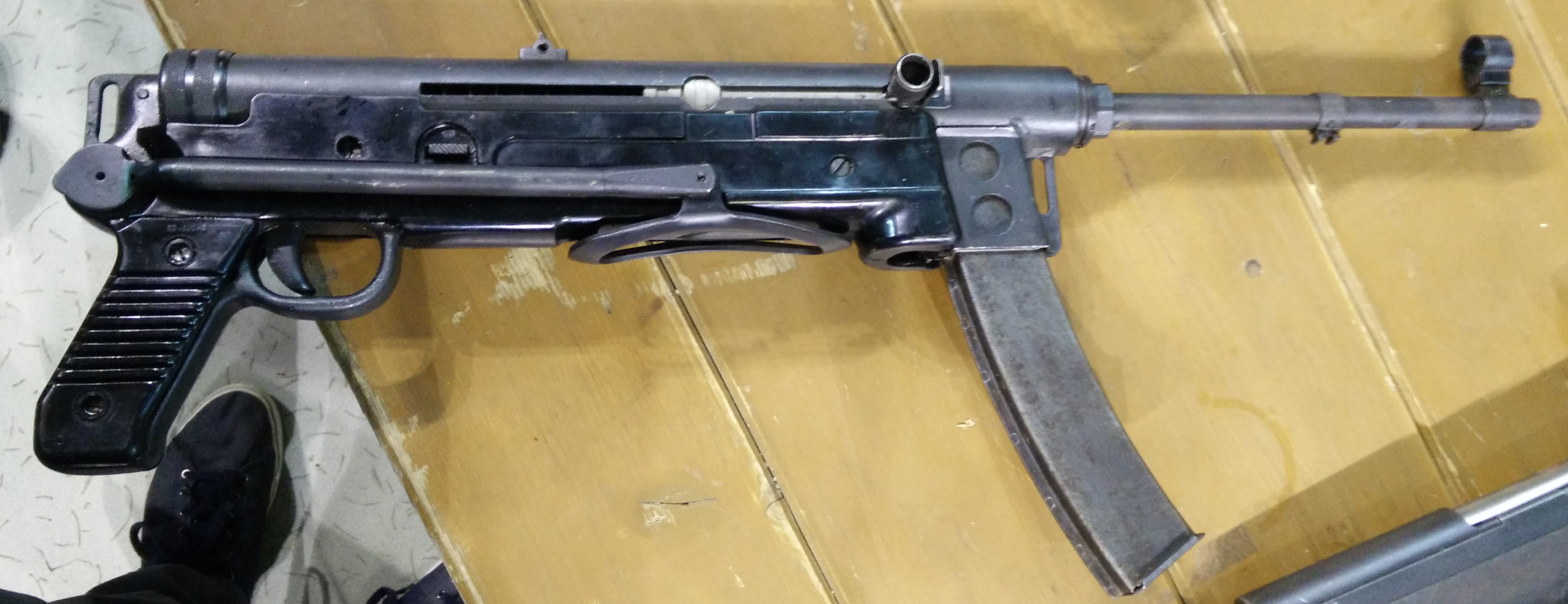
- Type: Submachine gun
- Place of origin: SFR Yugoslavia

Service history
- In service: 1961–Present
- Used by: see users
- Wars: Vietnam War; Yom Kippur War; Lebanese Civil War; Gulf War; Yugoslav Wars

Production history
- Designed: 1955–1959
- Manufacturer: Crvena Zastava
- Produced: 1960–1975
- No. built: 88,998

Specifications
- Mass: 3 kg (6.61 lb)
- Length: 870 mm (34.3 in) stock extended / 591 mm (23.3 in) stock folded
- Barrel length: 250 mm (9.8 in)
- Cartridge: 7.62×25mm Tokarev
- Action: Straight blowback, open bolt
- Rate of fire: 600 rounds/min
- Effective firing range: 200 m
- Feed system: 32-round detachable box magazine
- Sights: Front blade, flip-up rear iron sights

The M56 submachine gun is a Yugoslavian submachine gun chambered in 7.62×25mm Tokarev, designed for use with the Yugoslav People's Army. Initially a state-funded product, it was later produced by Zastava Arms and saw use in a number of conflicts following the breakup of former Yugoslavia. The M56 is based on the MP 40 submachine gun captured from Nazi Germany, easily distinguished from the MP 40 by its increased length and curved magazine.

Inexpensive and simple to produce and maintain, the M56 also proved to be quite effective at range over its German counterpart due to its 7.62×25mm cartridge having significantly higher velocity than the 9×19mm round used by the MP 40.

Internally the M56 lacks the telescoping recoil spring found in the MP 40. The magazine release also differs and is located directly behind the magazine instead of on the side of the receiver on the MP 40. The M56 also uses a double feed magazine (similarly to the Soviet PPS) contrary to the single feed magazines used on the MP 40. The M56 has a fire selector switch allowing the operator to fire in either semi or fully automatic which the MP 40 did not have. Disassembly also differed with the gun being taken apart via a rear end cap, separating the lower and upper receivers while the MP 40 this was accomplished by a button on the lower receiver located behind the magazine well. Another change from the MP 40 is that the M56 lacks the Bakelite resting bar below the barrel on the MP 40.

== Users ==
- Bosnia and Herzegovina
- Iraq
- Lebanon
- Vietnam
- Yugoslavia
- Zambia
