= 7.62×25mm Tokarev =

Pistol cartridge

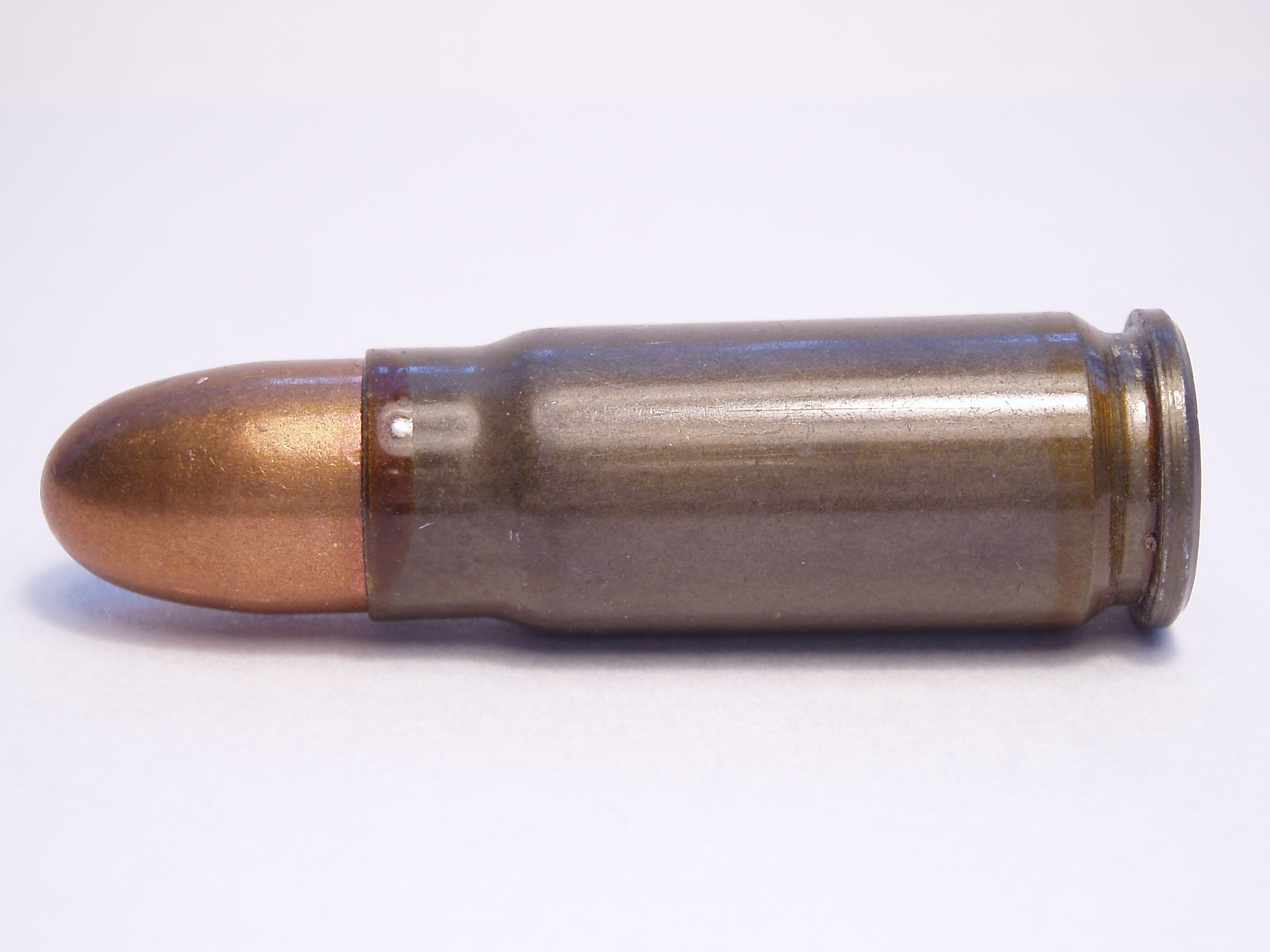
- A steel-cased FMJ 7.62mm Tokarev cartridge
- Type: Pistol
- Place of origin: Soviet Union

Production history
- Produced: 1930–present

Specifications
- Parent case: 7.63×25mm Mauser
- Case type: Rimless, bottleneck
- Bullet diameter: 7.85 mm (0.309 in)
- Land diameter: 7.62 mm (0.300 in)
- Neck diameter: 8.50 mm (0.335 in)
- Shoulder diameter: 9.48 mm (0.373 in)
- Base diameter: 9.83 mm (0.387 in)
- Rim diameter: 9.95 mm (0.392 in)
- Rim thickness: 1.32 mm (0.052 in)
- Case length: 25.00 mm (0.984 in)
- Overall length: 35.20 mm (1.386 in)
- Case capacity: 1.09 cm^{3} (16.8 gr H_{2}O)
- Rifling twist: 240 mm (1:9.45 inches)
- Primer type: Berdan or boxer small pistol

Ballistic performance
Bullet mass/type	Velocity	Energy
5.5 g (85 gr) JHP	376 m/s (1,230 ft/s)	390 J (290 ft⋅lbf)
5.8 g (90 gr) FMJ	409 m/s (1,340 ft/s)	488 J (360 ft⋅lbf)
5.5 g (85 gr) FMJ	469 m/s (1,540 ft/s)	605 J (446 ft⋅lbf)
5.5 g (85 gr) FMJ	497 m/s (1,630 ft/s)	697 J (514 ft⋅lbf)
5.5 g (85 gr) JHP	482 m/s (1,580 ft/s)	655 J (483 ft⋅lbf)
- Test barrel length: 120mm (4.724 in)

The 7.62×25mm Tokarev cartridge (designated as the 7.62 × 25 Tokarev by the C.I.P.) is a Soviet rimless bottleneck pistol cartridge widely used in former Soviet states and in China, among other countries. The cartridge was largely superseded in the Soviet Union by the 9×18mm Makarov cartridge.

== History ==
Prior to the First World War, the 7.63×25mm Mauser C96 pistol gained in popularity worldwide. In 1908, the Tsarist army placed the C96 on a list of approved sidearms that officers could purchase at their own expense in lieu of carrying the Nagant M1895 revolver. Between 1914 and 1917, more Mauser pistols and ammunition were obtained as captured arms from German and Turkish forces.

The Mauser and its cartridge were used on all fronts of the Russian Civil War and in the 1920s, during a period of relatively close cooperation between Soviet Russia and the Weimar Republic, the Red Army purchased batches of the smaller Bolo version as well as ammunition for use by its officers. Although a copy of the cartridge was being produced at the Podolsky Ammunition Factory, the Soviets eventually purchased a license and manufacturing equipment from DWM in Germany to produce the cartridge.

In 1929, the Soviet Artillery Committee made a proposal to develop a domestic pistol chambered for the Mauser cartridge. After considerable research and development, it was decided that the "Model 1930 7.62 mm pistol cartridge," essentially the Mauser round with minor modifications, was to become the standard caliber for Soviet pistols and submachine guns. Early versions of the Vasily Degtyaryov–designed PPD-40 submachine gun were marked for Mauser cartridge caliber 7.62 mm.

Although dimensionally similar to the Mauser cartridge (so much so that both cartridges will chamber, load, and fire in any of these firearms), the Soviets increased the power of the Tokarev cartridge powder charge significantly. As such, while the lower-power Mauser rounds can be safely used in any of these firearms, the Tokarev cartridge is not safe for use in firearms which were not designed for the added pressure.

== Cartridge dimensions ==
The 7.62×25mm Tokarev has 1.09 ml (16.8 grains H_{2}O) cartridge case capacity.

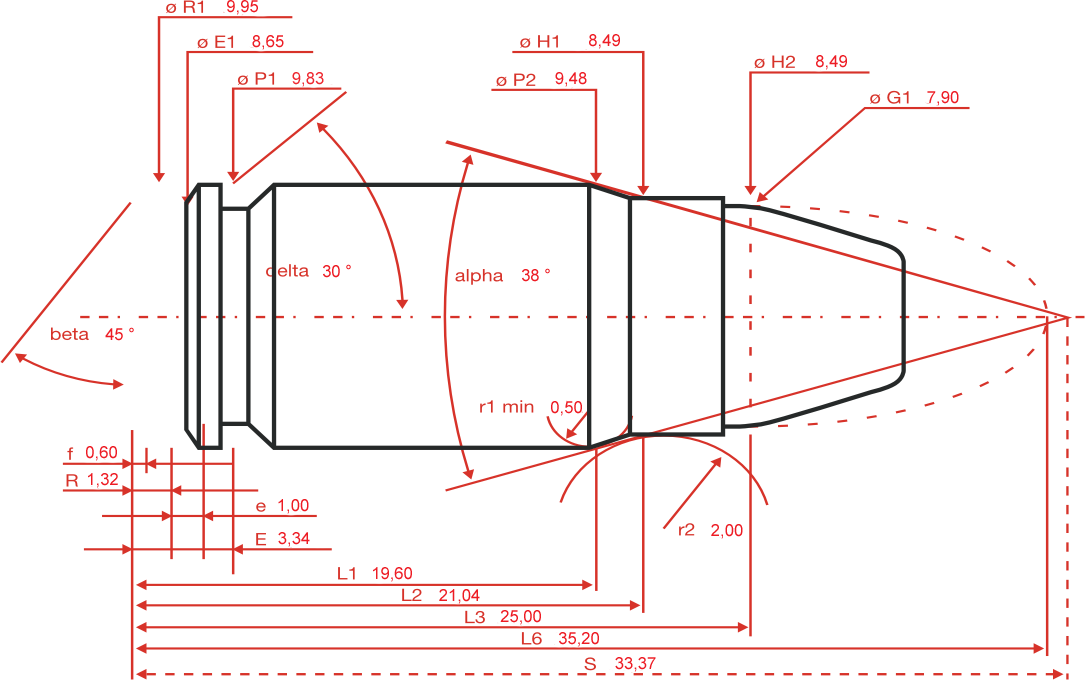
7.62×25mm Tokarev maximum C.I.P. cartridge dimensions All sizes in millimeters (mm)

Americans would define the shoulder angle at alpha/2 = 19 degrees. The common rifling twist rate for this cartridge is 240 mm (1 in 9.45 in), four grooves, diameter of lands = 7.62 mm (0.300 in), diameter of grooves = 7.92 mm (0.312 in), land width = 3.81 mm (0.150 in) and the primer type is Berdan or boxer small pistol.

According to the official C.I.P. (Commission Internationale Permanente pour l'Epreuve des Armes à Feu Portatives) rulings the 7.62×25mm Tokarev case can handle up to 250.00 MPa (36,259 psi) P_{max} piezo pressure. In C.I.P. regulated countries every handgun cartridge combo has to be proofed at 130% of this maximum C.I.P. pressure to certify for sale to consumers. This means that 7.62×25mm Tokarev chambered arms in C.I.P. regulated countries are currently (2017) proof tested at 325.00 MPa (47,137 psi) PE piezo pressure.

== Design ==
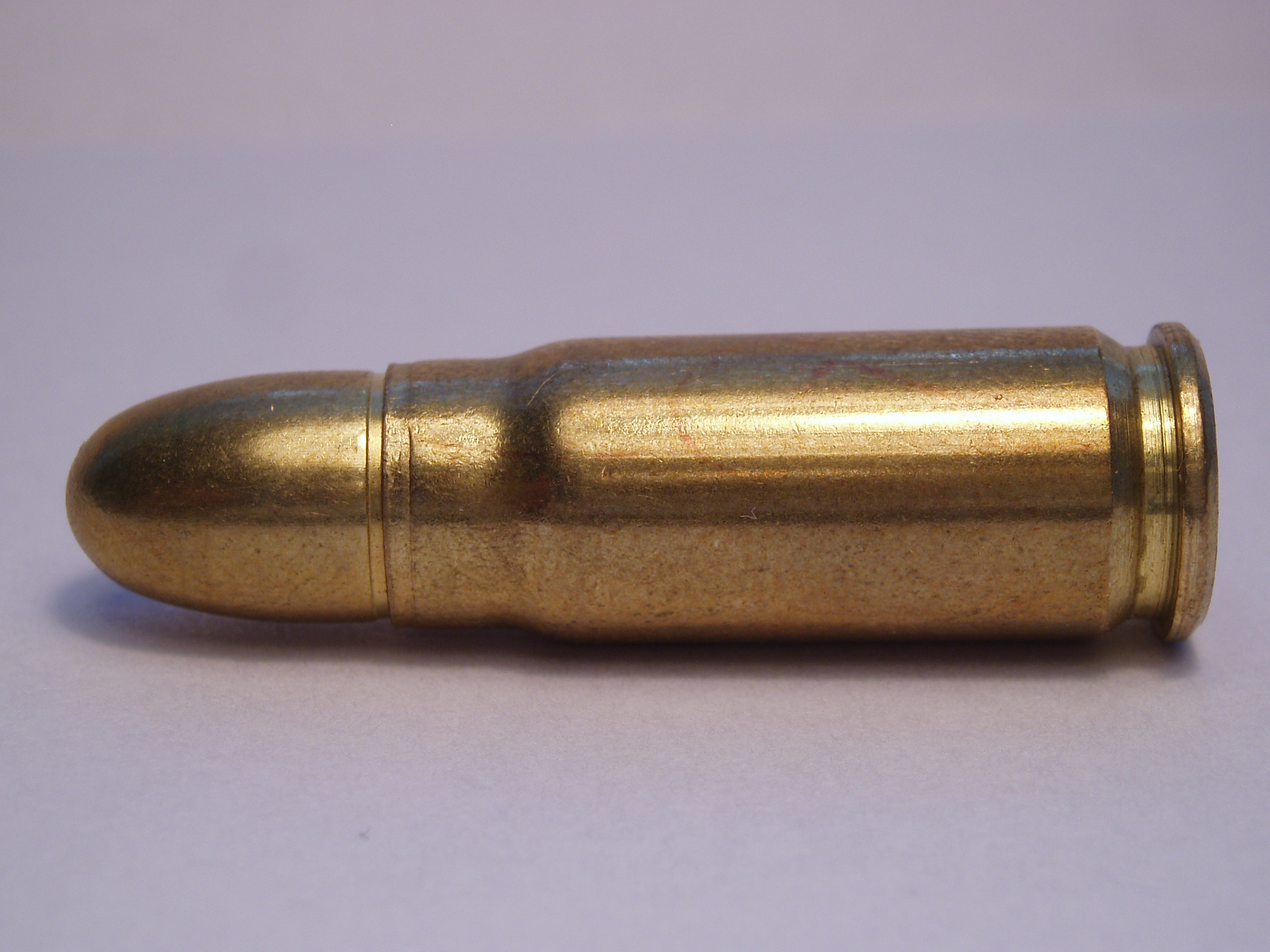
Sellier & Bellot 7.62×25mm Tokarev all-brass cartridge

The cartridge is in principle an enhanced Russian version of the 7.63×25mm Mauser. The Russians produced a wide array of loadings for this cartridge for use in submachine guns. These include armor-piercing, tracer, and incendiary rounds.

Although most firearms chambered in this caliber were declared obsolete and removed from military inventories, some police and special forces units in Russia, Pakistan, and China may still use it because of the large quantity of stored ammunition available. In 2018, 7.62×25 ammunition was available for export from Romania, Czech Republic, Bulgaria, Serbia, and Russia.

== Ammunition and performance ==
Various Tokarev cartridges achieve muzzle velocities around the range of 1,300 to 1,800 fps. A common velocity is around 442 metres per second (1,450 ft/s) with about 544 joules (401 ft⋅lbf) of energy. Given the wide disparity in ammunition manufactured in many different nations, ammunition is encountered that yields higher and lower velocities. Some newly manufactured ammunition intended for commercial use has a velocity of approximately 1,560 feet per second (480 m/s).

This cartridge has excellent penetration and can easily defeat lighter ballistic vests (NIJ level I and IIA) as well as some kevlar helmets, such as the American PASGT helmet. Ian McCollum was able to penetrate NIJ level IIIA soft body armor using Polish surplus FMJ ammo and a TT pistol with 4 out of 5 shots. (Level IIIA is an advanced version of the Level II that can stop faster bullets than Level II, but does not meet the Level III standard. NIJ standards factor in up to 1,400 fps of bullet velocity; higher-velocity rounds can eventually penetrate them, but by definition, level III must be able to stop any 7.65 mm bullet).

There is a common misconception that military surplus 7.62 Tokarev ammunition uses copper-coated mild steel bullets, and that this increases the chance of dangerous ricochets when fired at hard targets and can damage bullet traps often used on shooting ranges. While steel-core ammunition in 7.62×25 is available internationally, in the United States the importation of 7.62×25 cartridges loaded with copper-coated steel bullets is illegal; federal law defines these as armor-piercing pistol ammunition. So-called "steel bullets" sold are generally lead-core bullets with copper-washed steel jackets, and these do not present a significantly greater risk of ricochet than a standard copper-jacketed projectile.

=== Military variants ===
Soviet and Russian, by projectile type:

- P (П): standard FMJ lead-cored bullet. Comes in gl (brass case, 57-N-132), gs (steel case, wartime), gzh (steel case with tombac, 57-N-134) variants.
- P-41 (П-41), gl: 74 grain, steel-cored, incendiary variant. Not officially accepted for service but produced and used during World War II in the PPSh-41 and PPS-43. This ammunition would achieve a velocity of 1,600 feet per second (490 m/s) when fired from these firearms.
- PT (ПТ): tracer variant. gl (57-T-132) and gzh (57-T-133).
- Pst (Пст): steel-cored bullet. gl (57-N-132s) and gzh (57-N-134s).

Notable variants from other militaries:

- Type 64 / Type P: subsonic, heavy, pointed (spitzer) loading of the cartridge, designed specifically for use in suppressed firearms. Designed for the Type 64 submachine gun, also used by Type 85 submachine gun.

=== Civilian variants ===
Wolf Gold FMJ tops out at 1,720 feet per second (520 m/s) with 745 joules (549 ft⋅lbf) of energy, as does PPU ammunition. Some of this ammunition, such as the Wolf Gold and Sellier & Bellot, use boxer primed brass cases that are reloadable.

.223 Timbs is a wildcat cartridge resulting from replacing the projectile with a sabot containing a .223 Remington projectile, specifically a commercial 50gr jacketed soft point. This ammunition is intended to be used with an unmodified CZ-52 pistol. It achieves 2,000 feet per second (610 m/s) when fired from a CZ-52's 120 mm (4.7 in) barrel.

=== Reloading ===
If reloadable cartridge cases are not available they can be produced by resizing and trimming 9mm Winchester Magnum brass, or alternately by reforming 5.56×45mm NATO or 223 Remington cases. The cartridge case is inserted into a forming die, which produces a shoulder in the correct position, and the portion of the case projecting through the top is sawn off. Afterward, a reamer is used to ream out the new case neck to an acceptable thickness. This can also be accomplished by turning the neck to the correct thickness. This is necessary because a powerful rifle cartridge has been cut back to where the brass is relatively thick. If the brass is left too thick it may prevent chambering of the cartridge. Using this thicker brass may reduce the internal capacity of the cartridge and may cause excessive chamber pressures. Use appropriate caution when reloading converted rifle brass. Alternately, reloaders can purchase proper, new cases from Starline Mfg.

Use .308" or .309" bullets for reloading for the Tokarev TT-33 and Czech CZ-52. Mauser C96 and C30 "Broomhandle" pistols typically have oversized bores, and .311" bullets may be needed to produce acceptable accuracy. Hornady makes an 85-grain .309" "XTP" bullet that functions well in all these pistols. On the Starline website, information is given about using the slightly less powerful, but otherwise nearly identical ammunition designed for the Mauser C96 pistol (7.63×25mm Mauser) from which the Tokarev cartridge was derived, in pistols chambered for the Tokarev round. This was common practice by Finnish and German forces in WWII.

However, firing the 7.62×25 out of a Mauser C96 is not recommended, as it is too powerful and it may damage the pistol. Firearms that use the 7.62×25 cartridge can reliably fire 7.63×25mm rounds.

== Firearms and service use ==
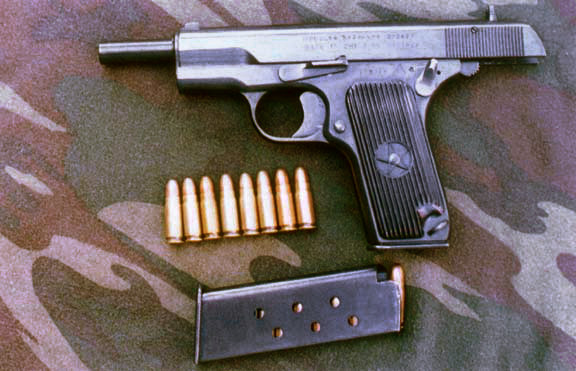
A Chinese copy of the TT-33 called the Type 54 with 7.62×25mm ammo

The most notable use of this cartridge was in the Tokarev TT-33 pistol, which was the Soviet Union's standard service pistol from the early 1930s until the mid-1950s. It was also used in the Yugoslavian Zastava M57 pistol, and the Czech ČZ vz. 52, which was the standard Czech service pistol from 1952 until 1982. Norinco of China makes a line of SIG Sauer clones including the NP762 chambered in 7.62×25mm Tokarev. In addition, the cartridge was used in numerous submachine guns, including the Soviet PPD-40, PPSh-41, and PPS-43, the Russian PP-19 Bizon, the East German WG66, the Czech Sa 24 and Sa 26.

One of the strangest weapons attempted for this cartridge was the LAD light machine gun (5.6 kg empty weight, 960 mm length), developed the Soviet designers V.F. Lyuty, N.M. Afanasyev and V.S. Daykin during 1942–1943. Only two prototypes were built and it was not accepted for service.

Outside COMECON countries it is not so common; however after the Cold War, many firearms, especially pistols, were exported and the round is still in production. The cartridge was also used in the Chinese QX-04, the Russian OTs-27 Berdysh pistol and OTs-39 submachine gun, the North Vietnamese K-50M and VPA/Viet Minh modified MAT-49s, Czech Sa 23 and the Yugoslav M49 and M56, the latter gun being developed from the design of the German MP40. Aftermarket conversion kits are also available for many firearms including the AR and AK platforms so they may fire the Tokarev round.

== Gallery ==
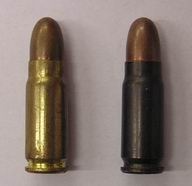
7.62mm Tokarev rounds. Left: Brass case FMJ. Right: lacquered steel case.

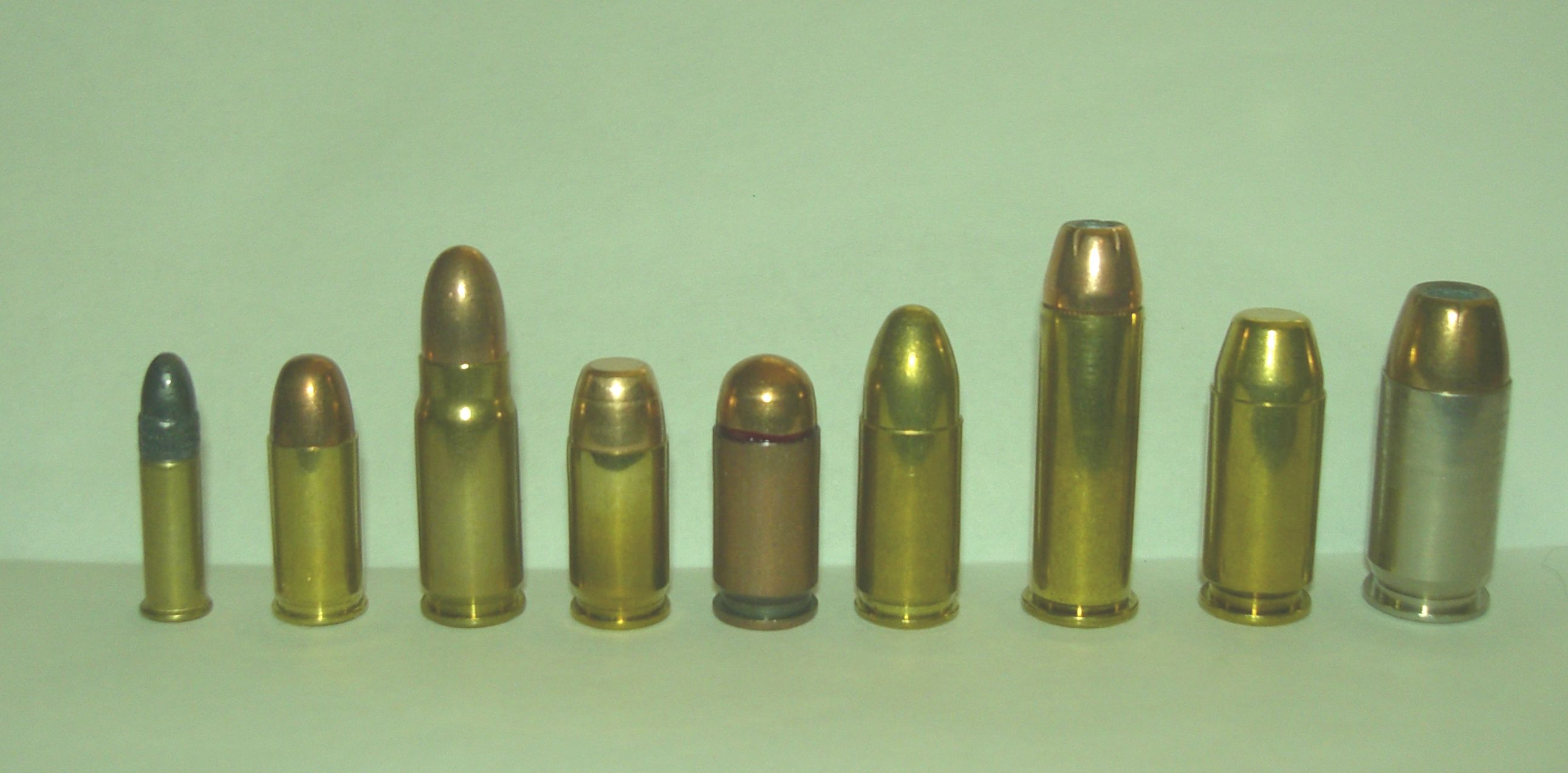
Round comparison 22 Long Rifle (lead round nose), .32 ACP/7.65mm Browning, 7.62×25mm Tokarev, .380 ACP / 9mm Kurz, 9mm Makarov, 9×19mm Parabellum, .38 Special (hollow point), .40 Smith & Wesson, .45 ACP (hollow point)

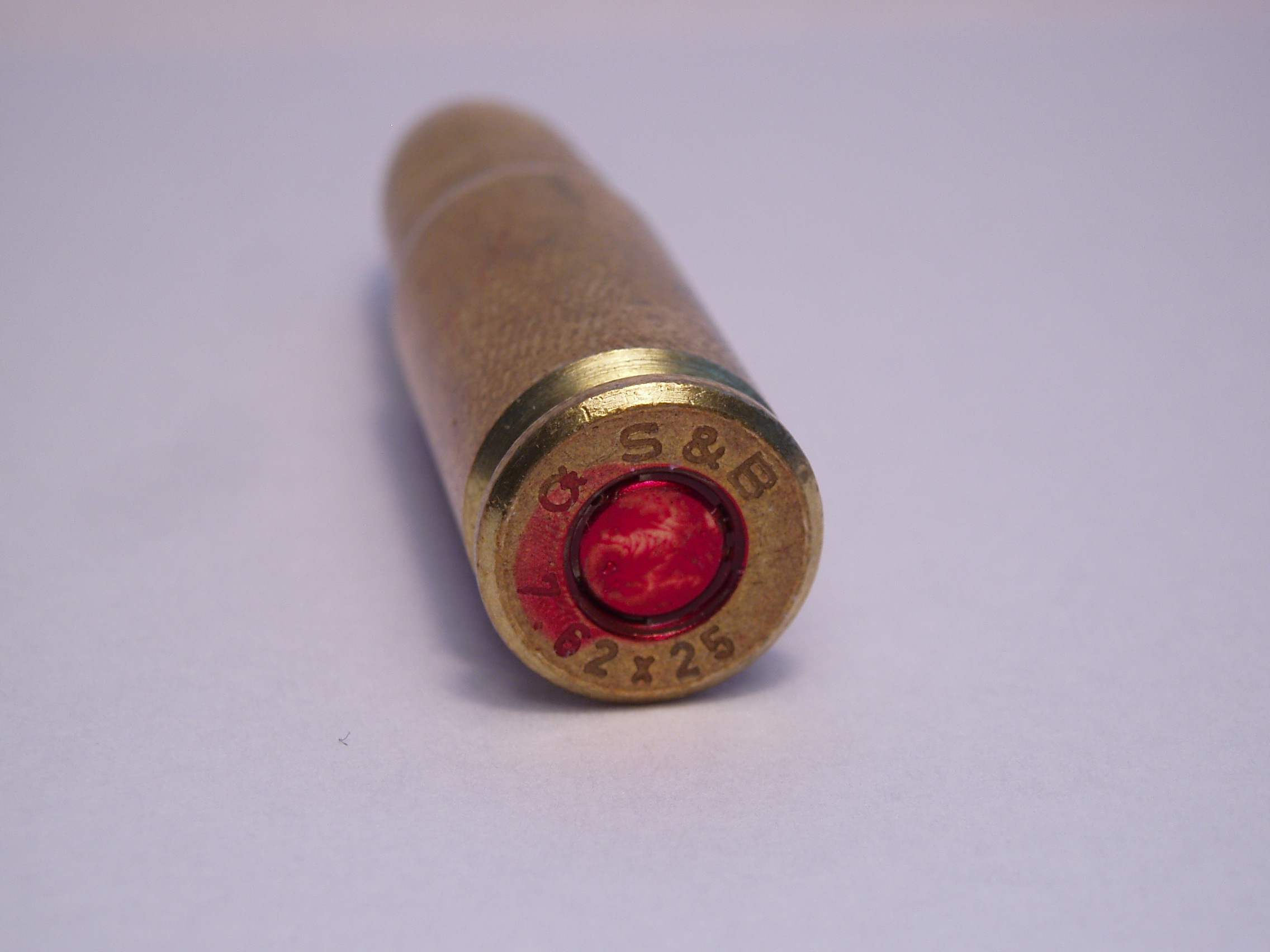
Rear view of the head-stamp on a Sellier & Bellot 7.62mm Tokarev cartridge

== Synonyms ==
- 7.62mm Type P (Chinese)
- 7.62mm Type 51 (Chinese)
- 7.62mm Tokarev
- 7.62×25mm TT
- .30 Tokarev
- Czech M48
- 7.62 TT
- .30 Bore - Pakistan Ordnance Factory (used for both 7.63mm Mauser and 7.62mm Tokarev)

== See also ==
- 7.62×25mm Tokarev firearms
- 7.65×25mm Borchardt
- 7.63×25mm Mauser
- 7.65×21mm Parabellum
- .30 Carbine
- 7 mm caliber
- 9×39mm
- Table of handgun and rifle cartridges
