= List of equipment of the Croatian Army =

This is a list of equipment in active service with the Croatian Army.

== Infantry weapons ==
=== Handguns ===
| Model | Image | Origin | Type | Calibre | Notes |
|---|---|---|---|---|---|
| HS Produkt HS2000 | | Croatia | Semi-automatic pistol | 9×19mm Parabellum | Standard issue sidearm. |

=== Submachine guns ===
| Model | Image | Origin | Type | Calibre | Notes |
|---|---|---|---|---|---|
| Heckler & Koch MP7 | | Germany | Personal defense weapon | 4.6×30mm HK | Used by the CROSOFCOM and the Special Military Police Company. |
| Heckler & Koch UMP | | Germany | Submachine gun | 9×19mm Parabellum /.45 ACP | Standard issue of the CROSOFCOM and the Special Military Police Company. |
| HS Produkt Kuna | | Croatia | Personal defense weapon | 9×19mm Parabellum | Replaced the aging Heckler & Koch MP5 and Arma ERO submachine guns used by the Croatian military and law enforcement communities. Presented at the 2025 military parade in Zagreb. |

=== Assault rifles ===
| Model | Image | Origin | Type | Calibre | Notes |
|---|---|---|---|---|---|
| HS Produkt VHS-2 | | Croatia | Assault rifle | 5.56×45mm NATO | Standard issue assault rifle. Replaced the Zastava M70 |
| Heckler & Koch G36 | | Germany | Assault rifle | 5.56×45mm NATO | Standard issue with the CROSOFCOM and the Special Military Police Company. |
| Heckler & Koch HK416 | | Germany | Assault rifle | 5.56×45mm NATO | Used by the CROSOFCOM. |

=== Machine guns ===
| Model | Image | Origin | Type | Calibre | Notes |
|---|---|---|---|---|---|
| FN Minimi | | Belgium Croatia (licence production) | Light machine gun | 5.56×45mm NATO | Acquired as squad and platoon support weapon. The purchase was completed as of 2023. |
| FN Minimi | | Belgium Croatia (licence production) | General-purpose machine gun | 7.62×51mm NATO | Acquired as squad and platoon support weapon. The purchase was completed as of 2023. |
| FN MAG | | Belgium | General-purpose machine gun | 7.62×51mm NATO | Used on armoured vehicles as coaxial machine gun (Leopard 2A4) and on weapon stations. |
| M240 | | Belgium (design) United States (production) | General-purpose machine gun | 7.62×51mm NATO | Used on armoured vehicles as coaxial machine gun (M2 Bradley) and on weapon stations. |
| Browning M2 | | United States | Heavy machine guns | 12.7×99mm NATO | Mostly mounted on armoured vehicles, including as remote weapon stations, of which 120+ are in use with the Croatian Army with more to be acquired. |
| Zastava M87 | | Yugoslavia | Heavy machine guns | 12.7×108mm | Mounted on M84 tanks which are planned to be retired. |

=== Precision rifles ===
| Model | Image | Origin | Type | Calibre | Notes |
|---|---|---|---|---|---|
| Heckler & Koch HK417 | | Germany | Designated marksman rifle | 7.62×51mm NATO | Standard issue designated marksman rifle. |
| SSG 69 | | Austria | Bolt action sniper rifle | 7.62×51mm NATO | |
| Sako TRG M10 | | Finland | Bolt action sniper rifle | 8.6×70mm | Standard issue sniper rifle. |
| MACS M4 | | Croatia | Anti materiel sniper rifle | 12.7×99mm NATO (.50 BMG) | Standard issue anti materiel sniper rifle. |

=== Grenade launchers ===
| Model | Image | Origin | Type | Calibre | Notes |
|---|---|---|---|---|---|
| HS Produkt VHS-BG | | Croatia | Under-barrel grenade launcher | 40×46mm LV | Purchased together with HS Produkt VHS Rifles. |
| Heckler & Koch AG36 | | Germany | Under-barrel grenade launcher | 40×46mm LV | Used with the HK G36 rifles. |
| Metallic RBG-6 | | South Africa Croatia (licence production) | Semi-automatic grenade launcher | 40×46mm LV | 136 used by the armed forces; 124 with the regular army, 12 used with the CROSOFCOM and the Special Military Police Company. |
| General Dynamics OTS - Mk 19 | | United States | Automatic grenade launcher | 40×53mm HV | Used on OGPK manned turrets that are used with: M1240A1 Oshkosh M-ATV; M1151 HMMV (with add-on armour kits); Patria AMV - ABG Mk19 (BOV-Mk19) Ordered in 2022 to modify the existing M151 Protector RCWS. |

=== Anti-tank weapons ===
| Model | Launchers | Image | Origin | Type | Calibre | Notes |
|---|---|---|---|---|---|---|
| RPG-22 | Disposable | | Yugoslavia Croatia | Rocket launcher | 72.5 mm | Light rocket launchers used by the dismounted infantry. |
| RGW90 HH | Disposable | | Germany | Recoilless gun | 90 mm | Plans for their purchase released in 2023 (€2.99 million). In The order took place in October 2023 and was confirmed by Dynamit Nobel Defence in November 2023. The HEAT / HESH variant was purchased. Their first use in training was witnessed in May 2025. The official magazine of the Armed Forces of Croatia, "Hrvatski Vojnik", published photos of the RGW90 in use with the 1st Mechanised Battalion "the Tigers". |
| 9K111 Fagot | Fire unit reusable, tube disposable | | Soviet Union | Anti-tank guided missile | 120 mm | The systems were purchased from Russia / Ukraine during the Croatian War of Independence (early 1990s). They have a reserve status, but remain in use today primarily for tactical training of the anti-tank infantry units, familiarisation with the foreign weapon systems. Successor: FGM-148 Javelin. |
| 9M113 Konkurs | Fire unit reusable, tube disposable | | Soviet Union | Anti-tank guided missile | 135 mm | The systems were purchased from Russia / Ukraine during the Croatian War of Independence (early 1990s). They have a reserve status, but remain in use today primarily for tactical training of the anti-tank infantry units, familiarisation with the foreign weapon systems. Successor: FGM-148 Javelin. |
| 9K115 Metis | Fire unit reusable, tube disposable | | Soviet Union | Anti-tank guided missile | 130 mm | The systems were purchased from Russia / Ukraine during the Croatian War of Independence (early 1990s). They have a reserve status, but remain in use today primarily for tactical training of the anti-tank infantry units, familiarisation with the foreign weapon systems. Successor: FGM-148 Javelin. |
| 9К115-2 Metis-M | Fire unit reusable, tube disposable | | Soviet Union | Anti-tank guided missile | 130 mm | The systems were purchased from Russia / Ukraine during the Croatian War of Independence (early 1990s). They have a reserve status, but remain in use today primarily for tactical training of the anti-tank infantry units, familiarisation with the foreign weapon systems. Successor: FGM-148 Javelin. |
| Spike LR2 | Patria AMV | | Israel Germany (manufactured by Eurospike) | Anti-tank guided missile | 130 mm | Used from a launcher with two missiles on the side of the Elbit UT30MK2 turret that are used with the 8 Patria AMV CRO 30L IFV in service. Orders: 2017: ordered with the turrets for the Patria AMV.; 2023, €11 million: for the Patria AMV in service and simulators, 20 launchers, 200 missiles Spike LR2.; Additional orders expected with the 30 additional Patria AMV that are ordered. |
| BGM-71 TOW 2 | M2A2 Bradley ODS | | United States | Anti-tank guided missile | 152 mm | 1,703 missiles as part of the acquisition of the M2A2 Bradley ODS from the US Army (no dismounted tripod launcher). All the missiles are in the RF variant (wireless guidance). The sub-variants purchased are: 1,103 TOW-2A; 500 TOW-BB-RF (bunker buster); 100 TOW-2B-RF |
| 9M14 Malyutka | BVP M-80A | | Soviet Union | Anti-tank guided missile | 125 mm | To be retired, as the vehicle operating it is being replaced by the M2A2 Bradley ODS. |

== Artillery ==
=== Mortars ===
| Model | Image | Origin | Type | Calibre | Quantity | Notes |
|---|---|---|---|---|---|---|
| M57 | | Yugoslavia | Light mortar | 60 mm | (Unknown) | Range: ≤ 3.5 km (2.2 mi) Mortars modified to meet NATO standards. |
| M96 | | Yugoslavia Croatia | Mortar | 82 mm | (Unknown) | Improved variant based on the Yugoslavian M69 mortar. Range for various mines: Anti-armour: ≤ 4.8 km (3.0 mi); Standard: ≤ 5.6 km (3.5 mi); Illuminating: ≤ 4.2 km (2.6 mi); Mortars modified to meet NATO standards. |
| M75 | | Yugoslavia | Heavy mortar | 120 mm | (Unknown) | Range for various mines: Anti-armour: ≤ 9.5 km (5.9 mi); Standard: ≤ 6.6 km (4.1 mi); Illuminating: ≤ 5.5 km (3.4 mi); Mortars modified to meet NATO standards. |

=== Towed artillery ===
| Model | Image | Origin | Type | Calibre | Quantity | Notes |
|---|---|---|---|---|---|---|
| M116 howitzer | | United States | Ceremonial cannon (Mountain gun) | 75 mm L/18 | 12 | Used primarily as ceremonial cannons. Range: ≤ 8.8 km (5.5 mi) |
| D-30 RH M94 | | Soviet Union (original design) Croatia (production / modifications) | Howitzer | 122 mm L/38 | 54 | Some of the D-30 were transferred to Ukraine (with M1954 (M-46)). Variant modified by Croatia (new muzzle brake, redesigned trail, improved hydraulic break). To be replaced by the Caesar Mk2 artillery system. |

=== Self-propelled howitzers ===
| Model | Image | Origin | Type | Calibre | Quantity | Notes |
|---|---|---|---|---|---|---|
| PzH 2000 | | Germany | Self-propelled howitzer | 155 mm L/52 | 16 | System purchased second-hand from the German Army (€55 million). Among the 16 howitzers: 12 in service and were modernised; 1 used for training; 3 for spare parts; As of 2023, additional purchases are expected. Range up to 54 km (34 mi) with the V-LAP shell. |
| 2S1 Gvozdika | | Soviet Union | Self-propelled artillery | 122 mm L/35 | 8 | To be replaced by the Caesar Mk2 artillery system. |

=== Rocket artillery ===
| Model | Image | Origin | Type | Calibre | Quantity | Notes |
|---|---|---|---|---|---|---|
| M-92 Vulkan | | Yugoslavia; Croatia | Multiple launch rocket system | 122 mm | 6 | System currently used by the Croatian contingent in Battle Group Poland. Former M-77 Oganj (128 mm) from the Yugoslavian Army that were captured by Croatia, or captured during the War of Independence. Modified by Croatia to use the 122 mm rockets used within the Eastern European allied armies. Range up to 20 km (12 mi). |
| APR–40 | | Socialist Republic of Romania | Multiple launch rocket system | 122 mm | 30 | Acquired by Croatia in 1991 from Romania (former Warsaw Pact) during the War of Independence. It is based on the BM-21 Grad and installed on a DAC -665T 6×6 truck. Range up to 20 to 40 km (12 to 25 mi). |

== Armoured vehicles ==
=== Main battle tanks ===
| Model | Image | Origin | Type | Weapons | Quantity | Notes |
|---|---|---|---|---|---|---|
| M-84A4 Sniper | | Yugoslavia Croatia | Main battle tank | 2A46 (125 mm smoothbore) Zastava M87 (12.7×108mm) | 45 | 30 M-84s and 30 M-80s were transferred to Ukraine through a "Ringtausch". Germany offered an exchange for Leopard 2A8 at a discounted price. |
| Leopard 2A4 HRV | | West Germany Germany | Main battle tank | Rh-120 L/44 (120 mm smoothbore) FN MAG (7.62×51mm NATO) | (unknown) | Tanks leased for training and transition to the Leopard 2 platform until the arrival of the Leopard 2A8. Introduced in service in July 2025. |

=== Tracked infantry fighting vehicles ===
| Model | Image | Origin | Type | Weapons | Quantity | Notes |
|---|---|---|---|---|---|---|
| M-80A | | Yugoslavia | Infantry fighting vehicle | Zastava M55 (HS804) (20×110 mm) 9M14 Malyutka M86 PKT (7.62×54mmR) | 74 | 30 M-80s and 30 M-84s were transferred to Ukraine through a "Ringtausch". Germany offered an exchange for Leopard 2A8 at a discounted price. |
| M2 Bradley (A2 ODS SA) | | United States Croatia (overhaul) | Infantry fighting vehicle | M242 Bushmaster (25×137 mm) BGM-71 TOW 2 M240 (7.62×51mm NATO) | 62 | 89 vehicles were donated by the US, and the refurbishment of 62 Bradley is financed by Croatia, performed by Đuro Đaković. Out of 89 Bradley purchased, 62 will be in service, with the Sokolovi Battalion of the Guards Armoured Mechanized Brigade. The other will be used as a spare part reserve and for training. The first 4 Bradley entered service in January 2025. |
| M2 Bradley (A2 ODS SA) | | United States Croatia (overhaul) | Training vehicles Spare parts reserve | — | 27 | 27 out of the 89 received Bradley are used for training and as a spare parts reserve. |

=== Wheeled armoured vehicles ===
==== Patria AMV summary of variants ordered ====
| Model | Image | Origin | Type | Weapons / equipment | Quantity | Notes |
|---|---|---|---|---|---|---|
| Patria AMV - Summary | | Finland Croatia (partial local production / assembly by Đuro Đaković) | Armoured fighting vehicle (8×8) | Depends on the variant | 126 | Note: every variant and their quantity are mentioned n their relevant category. Orders: October 2007: 84 vehicles; January 2009: 42 vehicles; In July 2010, the contract was amended to modify the types of vehicles ordered. Delivery: 126 between 2008 and 2012; The Croatian ministry of defence, the manufacturers mention seven variants in service: Known quantities (12): 8 BOV-P30 - IFV; 2 BOV-San - armoured ambulance; 2 BOV-Log - recovery and repair; Unknown quantities (114): BOV-P12.7 / BOV-Mk19 - APC; BOV-P12.7 / BOV-Mk19 - APC amphibious; BOV-ZP - Infantry command |

==== Wheeled infantry fighting vehicles ====
| Model | Image | Origin | Type | Weapons / equipment | Quantity | Notes |
|---|---|---|---|---|---|---|
| Patria AMV - AIFV-30 (BOV-P30) Armoured infantry fighting vehicle | | Finland Croatia (partial local production / assembly by Đuro Đaković) | Infantry fighting vehicle | UT30 Mk2 turret Mk44S Bushmaster II (30×173 mm) Spike LR2 M240C (7.62×51mm NATO) | 8 | Part of the two first batches ordered in 2007 / 2009, but the 8 turrets were ordered in 2017 (USD $14.9 million). The vehicles were all delivered with their new capability by the end of 2020. Note: additional planned with the 30 Patria AMV approved for order. |

Unmanned turrets ordered:

| Model | Image | Origin | Type | Weapons / equipment | Quantity | Notes |
|---|---|---|---|---|---|---|
| Elbit UT30 Mk2 turret | | Israel | Remote controlled weapon station | Mk44S Bushmaster II (30×173 mm) Spike LR M240C (7.62×51mm NATO) | 8 | Orders of the turrets: 2017: contract for 8 turrets, worth USD $14.9 million; 2021: contract worth $1.8 million for an unknown amount of turrets; Only 8 have been confirmed to be in service. |

==== Wheeled tank destroyers ====
| Model | Image | Origin | Type | Weapons / equipment | Quantity | Notes |
|---|---|---|---|---|---|---|
| Patria AMV - ATGMV (BOV-POB) Anti-tank guided missile vehicle | — | Finland Croatia (partial local production / assembly by Đuro Đaković) | Tank destroyer, anti-tank guided missile | ICLU (Integrated Control Launch Unit (ICLU)Spike LR2 Kongsberg Protector M151 M2 Browning (12.7×99mm NATO) | 8 | 8 are in service. Spike LR2 ordered in 2023 for the existing Patria AMV fleet. The firing systems are transported in the vehicle, and the vehicle is equipped with a RCWS. |

==== Wheeled armoured personnel carriers and command vehicles ====
| Model | Image | Origin | Type | Weapons / equipment | Quantity | Notes |
|---|---|---|---|---|---|---|
| Patria AMV - AICV (BOV-ZP) Armoured infantry command vehicle | | Finland Croatia (partial local production / assembly by Đuro Đaković) | Command and control | Kongsberg Protector M151 M2 Browning (12.7×99mm NATO) | (Unknown) | |
| Patria AMV - AIFV-12.7 (BOV-12.7) Infantry fighting vehicle | | Finland Croatia (partial local production / assembly by Đuro Đaković) | Armoured personnel carrier | Kongsberg Protector M151 M2 Browning (12.7×99mm NATO) | (Unknown) | Part of the 96 Patria AMV used as an APC, this one equipped with a machine gun for fire support. |
| Patria AMV - ABG Mk19 (BOV-Mk19) Infantry fighting vehicle | | Finland Croatia | Armoured personnel carrier | Kongsberg Protector M151 Mk 19 (40×53mm HV) | (Unknown) | Part of the 96 Patria AMV used as an APC, this one equipped with an automatic grenade launcher for fire support. The grenade launchers were ordered in 2022 to equip the RCWS which was exclusively using the M2 Browning prior to that. |
| Patria AMV - AIFV-12.7 (BOV-12.7) Infantry fighting vehicle | — | Finland Croatia (partial local production / assembly by Đuro Đaković) | Armoured personnel carrier, amphibious | Kongsberg Protector M151 M2 Browning (12.7×99mm NATO) | (Unknown) | Part of the 96 Patria AMV used as an APC, this one is amphibious and equipped with a machine gun for fire support. |
| Patria AMV - ABG Mk19 (BOV-Mk19) Infantry fighting vehicle | — | Finland Croatia | Armoured personnel carrier, amphibious | Kongsberg Protector M151 Mk 19 (40×53mm HV) | (Unknown) | Part of the 96 Patria AMV used as an APC, this one is amphibious and equipped with an automatic grenade launcher for fire support. The grenade launchers were ordered in 2022 to equip the RCWS which was exclusively using the M2 Browning prior to that. |

Unmanned turrets ordered:

| Model | Image | Origin | Type | Weapons / equipment | Quantity | Notes |
|---|---|---|---|---|---|---|
| Kongsberg Protector M151 | | Norway Croatia (partial local production / assembly by Đuro Đaković) | Remote controlled weapon station | M2 Browning (12.7×99mm NATO) / Mk 19 (40×53mm HV) | 114 | Orders: July 2010: NOK 115 million; May 2013: NOK 100 million (acquisition and installation); Initially only equipped with the M2 Browning, and a contract to modify some to receive the Mk19 grenade launcher was signed in August 2022. Production under licence in Croatia. |

==== Infantry mobility vehicles ====
| Model | Image | Origin | Type | Weapons / equipment | Quantity | Notes |
|---|---|---|---|---|---|---|
| M1224 International MaxxPro PLUS (4×4) | (Turret OGPK) | United States | Infantry mobility vehicle, mine-resistant ambush protected vehicle | OGPK - manned turret (Objective Gunner Protection Kit) Browning M2 (12.7×99mm NATO) | 30 | Approved in 2013. Received in 2014 from the US Army. It is used by: 21 - with the army; 5 - CROSOFCOM; 2 - support command; 2 - military police regiment |
| M1240 A1 Oshkosh M-ATV (4×4) MRAP All Terrain Vehicle | | United States | Infantry mobility vehicle, mine-resistant ambush protected vehicle | OGPK - manned turret (Objective Gunner Protection Kit) Browning M2 (12.7×99mm NATO) | 162 | Approved in 2013 in 2 batches, one for 120 M-ATV, the other for 42 additional M-ATV. The 162 vehicles were received in from 2014 to 2016.: 140 - GMBR (mechanised brigade) in the 1st Motorised Battalion - Wolves; 15 - CROSOFCOM; 5 - support command; 2 - military police regiment |
| M1151 enhanced-armament carrier HMMWV (up-armoured capable) | | United States | Infantry mobility vehicle | FN M240B (7.62×51mm NATO) Mk 19 (40×53 mm HV) ANIPRC-148 (radio) | 50 | Programme 1202: 30 M1151 HMMWV; Programme 1206: 7 Humvee in 2010, equipped with ANIPRC-148 radio (3 Machine Guns and 4 ); 13 Humvee purchased in 2011 (with radio + machine guns), delivered in 2011. |
| M1114 up-armoured armament carrier HMMWV | | United States | Infantry mobility vehicle | FN M240B (7.62×51mm NATO) Mk 19 (40×53 mm HV) ANIPRC-148 (radio) | 18 | Programme 1202: 18 M1114 HMMWV |
| Iveco LMV (4×4) Light multirole vehicle | | Italy Croatia | Infantry mobility vehicle, mine-resistant ambush protected vehicle | — | 10 | 10 purchased in 2007. |

==== Armoured ambulances / MEDEVAC ====
| Model | Image | Origin | Type | Weapons / equipment | Quantity | Notes |
|---|---|---|---|---|---|---|
| Patria AMV - AAV (BOV-San) Armoured ambulance vehicle | | Finland Croatia (partial local production / assembly by Đuro Đaković) | Armoured ambulance | — | 2 | 2 out of 126 vehicles are in this variant. |
| RG-33 HAGA (6×6) Heavily armoured ground ambulance | | South Africa | Armoured ambulance - mine-resistant ambush protected vehicle | — | 20 | Approved in 2013 by the USA. 20 received from the United States in 2014 / 2015. |

== Engineering equipment ==
=== Recovery vehicles ===
| Model | Image | Origin | Type | Quantity | Notes |
|---|---|---|---|---|---|
| T-55TZI | | Soviet Union | Armoured recovery vehicle | (Unknown) | Awaiting replacement. |
| Patria AMV - ARRV (BOV-Log) Armoured repair and recovery vehicle | | Finland Croatia (partial local production / assembly by Đuro Đaković) | Armoured recovery vehicle | 2 | 2 out of 126 vehicles are in this variant. |
| International MaxxPro MRV-P (6×6) MRAP Recovery Vehicle | | United States | Wrecker / Armoured recovery vehicle | 6 | It is equipped with a 30-ton boom recovery crane, and drag winches. |

=== Bridging equipment ===
| Model | Image | Origin | Type | Quantity | Notes |
|---|---|---|---|---|---|
| MT-55A | | Soviet Union Czechoslovakia | Armoured bridge vehicle | (Unknown) | Currently awaiting replacement by a modern NATO system. |
| TMM-3 | | Soviet Union | Bridge laying vehicle | (Unknown) | The TMM-3 is a heavy launch bridge kit mounted on the KrAZ 255B chassis. It is expected to be replaced by a NATO equivalent. |
| PMS | | Soviet Union | Pontoon bridge | (Unknown) | The pontoons are mounted on both Tatra T813 8×8 and FAP 6×6 trucks. It is expected to be replaced by a NATO equivalent. |
| Bailey M-1 | | (Unknown) | Bailey bridge | (Unknown) | |

=== Demining and EOD equipment ===
| Model | Image | Origin | Type | Quantity | Notes |
|---|---|---|---|---|---|
| MV-4 | | Croatia | Remote-controlled mine flail | (Unknown) | Used for demining operations. Produced in Croatia by DOK-ING. |
| Telerob tEODor | | Germany | Explosive ordnance disposal robot | (Unknown) | |
| IRobot PackBot P510 | | United States | Explosive ordnance disposal robot | (Unknown) | |
| EOD 9 | | United States | Explosive ordnance disposal suit | (Unknown) | |

=== Construction equipment ===
| Model | Image | Origin | Type | Quantity | Notes |
|---|---|---|---|---|---|
| CAT D8 | | United States | Armoured bulldozer | (Unknown) | At least 1 in service (seen at the parade). |
| CAT D6T | | United States | Bulldozer | (Unknown) | At least 2 in service (seen at the parade). |
| CASE | | Italy | Excavators | (Unknown) | Various number of CASE products in active use. |
| JCB js210 | — | United Kingdom | Excavators | (Unknown) | |
| JCB 426 HTM | | United Kingdom | Wheel loader | (Unknown) | |
| JCB 4CX | | United Kingdom United States (partial local production / assembly) | Backhoe loader | 1 | Donated by the US in 2019. |

=== Amphibious vehicles, boats and small barges ===
| Model | Image | Origin | Type | Notes |
|---|---|---|---|---|
| PTS-M | | Soviet Union | Amphibious vehicle | In good condition, although lack of spare parts are making them serviceable difficult. Currently awaiting replacement by a modern NATO system. |

== Unarmoured vehicles ==
=== Military utility vehicles ===
| Model | Image | Origin | Type | Quantity | Notes |
|---|---|---|---|---|---|
| Mercedes G / Puch G | | Austria West Germany Germany | Military light utility vehicle | 300 (estimate) | Standard utility vehicle of the Croatian Army, 250 units ordered in the 2000s, all delivered and in service. Further deliveries in 2015 and 2017 to replace the oldest vehicles in service. |
| Toyota Landcruiser | | Japan | Military light utility vehicle | 80 (estimate) | 150 ordered in 2008 and delivered in 2010, half went to other government departments, including the Ministry of the Interior. All are in good serviceable condition. It is the standard utility vehicle in service with the Croatian Army and other governmental agencies of Croatia. |
| Land Rover Wolf | | United Kingdom | Military light utility vehicle | 32 (estimate) | Primarily used by the military police. Many transferred to the Croatian Border Police. Of the 200 ordered in 1998, only 32 remain in service with the armed forces. Some 120 were transferred to civilian use, many ending up with the Croatian Mountain Rescue Service. |
| Jeep Wrangler J8 | | United States | Military light utility vehicle | 5 | Donated by the US for the Croatian Army engineering regiment, along with other equipments, and it supports partially the Croatian UN military peace keeping missions. Quantity in service: 5 received as part of a 2017 aid package |
| Ford Ranger | | United States | Military light pickup | 30 (owned) 120 (lesased) | The Croatian Army is currently leasing as many as 120 pickup trucks but also owns additional 30 trucks. 50 vehicles were bought for Croatian Ministry of Interior. |

=== Logistic vehicles ===
==== Military trucks ====
The Croatian Army relies heavily on the stock of old trucks and supply vehicles. It captured a vast stock of trucks, various transport and utility vehicles during the Croatian War of Independence and the Battle of the Barracks; at least 250 FAP trucks, 650 TAM trucks and a number of Soviet trucks such as ZiL, Ural or Maz were captured and put into military service. Many of these vehicles are still in service with the Croatian Army, even though some are over 50 years old. Torpedo 4x4 trucks, light 2.5T trucks were built in large quantities. Some 80 samples entered service with the Army in early 1990s. However, with Croatia joining NATO the Croatian Army started looking into acquiring western types of trucks including MAN TG Mill, Iveco 5T Transport Truck and Mercedes trucks among others. However, due to the shortage of funds logistics formations within the Croatian Army are the last to get modern vehicles. In the past decade the Croatian Army started to renew its logistic and tactical truck fleet sporadically with purchases or donations of smaller quantities of new trucks. In the long-term the Croatian Army plans to reduce the number of vehicle types in service down to only three manufactures: MAN, Mercedes and Iveco. Currently over a dozen of different manufactures of vehicle types are in service creating costly maintenance issues.

| Model | Image | Origin | Type | Quantity | Notes |
|---|---|---|---|---|---|
| Tatra T815-7 6×6 | | Czech Republic | Military off-road tactical truck | 420 | In October 2025, the Czech and Croatian governments came to agreement on the purchase of the trucks, with deliveries from 2026 to 2030. In November 2025, the budget of €200 million for their purchase was approved by the parliament. First trucks were delivered in 2026. |
| Tatra T815-7 8×8 | | Czech Republic | Military off-road tactical truck | 420 | In October 2025, the Czech and Croatian governments came to agreement on the purchase of the trucks, with deliveries from 2026 to 2030. In November 2025, the budget of €200 million for their purchase was approved by the parliament. First trucks were delivered in 2026. |
| TAM - Torpedo TK 130 T7 4×4 | | Croatia | Military truck | 80~ | Large number of these trucks in various configurations still serve in many roles within Croatian Army, they're being replaced by modern models but, due to defence budget cutbacks, these vehicles are likely to remain in service for the foreseeable future. |
| TAM | | Slovenia Yugoslavia | Military truck | 150~ | A large number of these trucks in various configurations still serve in many roles within the Croatian Army, they're being replaced by modern models but, due to defence budget cutbacks, these vehicles are likely to remain in service for the foreseeable future. These vehicles are, in many cases, now over 40 years old; replacement is sought when and where possible. |
| FAP 2026 | | Yugoslavia | Military truck | 40~ | Croatian Army inherited a large number of FAP 2026 trucks during the Croatian War of Independence and the Battle of the Barracks when the Croatian Army captured over 250~ of these trucks, today only 40~ or so remain in service in various roles and are being replaced by modern western models due to lack of spare parts. |
| Ford Cargo (3542D, 6×4) | | Turkey | Dump truck | 12 | Donated by the US for the Croatian Army engineering regiment, along with other equipments (machines, field kithen, field hospital), and it supports partially the Croatian UN military peace keeping missions. Quantity in service: 6 received in April 2019 (as part of a 2017 aid package); 6 received in July 2019 |
| Iveco ACTL tactical trucks | | Italy | Military truck | 3 | 3 units ordered in 2007 with a larger delivery of Iveco Trakker heavy trucks. |
| Iveco EuroTrakker | | Italy | Military truck | 3 | 39 Iveco Army trucks purchased in 2004 at inflated price which caused a major scandal resulting in dismissal of the then Defence Minister. 3 of these were EuroTrakker Trucks. These trucks are mostly used in support and logistics role. These trucks are now over 20 years old. |
| Iveco 5T Transport Truck | | Italy | Military truck | 80~ | Initial order of 36 vehicles made in 2004 and a subsequent order for additional 80 vehicles was made in 2008 and 2009. Currently around 80 vehicles in service. |
| Iveco Trakker | | Italy | Military truck | 32~ | Initial order of a half a dozen or so vehicles was made in 2007. Most are used alongside the MAN trucks for the heavy transporter role. Currently just over a dozen or so new vehicles were delivered between 2017 and 2020 for total of 32~ vehicles at the end of 2020. |
| MAN KAT1 4×4, 6×6, 8×8 | | Germany | Military truck | 80~ | The initial purchase of 27 German Army trucks. In 2015, the Croatian Ministry of Defence bought 10 more trucks in accordance with the 2013 Framework Agreement from the surplus of the Bundeswehr. Since 2016, a number of additional vehicles were purchased, total number exceeds 50 vehicles in service as of 2020. |
| MAN Tank Transporter | | Germany | Military truck | 20~ | 20 older MAN units in service, currently being replaced by other modern equivalents. |
| MAN TG Mill | | Germany | Military truck | 15~ | Initial purchase of 4-5 MAN TGMIL trucks was made in 2015, to supplement the current fleet of Iveco heavy equipment transporters and replace older MAN models that were retired. In 2017/2020, Croatian Ministry of Defence bought ~10 additional MAN TGMIL trucks to supplement its current fleet of heavy trucks. |
| Mercedes Benz NG | | Germany | Military truck | | Many acquired in late 90s and early 2000s, exact number of these vehicles is unknown. A replacement by the modern Mercedes-Benz Actros is currently underway. |
| Mercedes-Benz Actros | | Germany | Military truck | 30~ | Standard heavy utility vehicle of the Croatian Army, 30+ units ordered in 2010, 2017 and 2020 and all were delivered and are in service. The Croatian Army is looking to get number of new Mercedes-Benz Actros for the heavy transporter role. |
| Mercedes-Benz Arocs | | Germany | Military truck | 12~ | A number of new vehicles delivered in 2019/2021, at least 4 used in the heavy transporter role with the rest being multi-use logistic trucks that come with a modular hook lift system that simplify recovery or transport of large items in the modular flatbed system. |

==== Handling equipment ====
| Model | Image | Origin | Type | Quantity | Notes |
|---|---|---|---|---|---|
| Kalmar RT250 | | Finland | Reach stacker | (Unknown) | At least two of these are in service. Designed to handle 20 and 40-foot containers, capacity of 25 tons. |
| Fantuzzi | | Italy | Heavy forklifts | (Unknown) | At least two of these are used by the Croatian Army. They have a capacity of 15 tons. |
| Locatelli | | Italy | Rough terrain mobile crane | (Unknown) | At least two of these are used by the Croatian Army. They have a capacity of 20 tons. |

==== Civilian utility vehicles ====
| Model | Image | Origin | Type | Notes |
|---|---|---|---|---|
| Fiat Ducato | | Italy | Van | Many ordered over the past decade, mostly used in logistics and transportation roles. In the process of phasing out. |
| Volkswagen Transporter | | Germany | Van | The Croatian Army acquired large quantities of these vehicles over the years, with as many as 70 currently in service. In the process of phasing out. |
| Citroën Relay | | France | Van | Serving as emergency response vehicles. |
| Iveco Daily | | Italy | Van | Initial order of a half a dozen or so vehicles was made in 2007. Most are used alongside the FAP and TAM medium trucks for the logistical transport role. To replace older FAP, TAM trucks in service with the Croatian Army. |
| Renault Master | | France | Van | Used in the personnel transportation roles. |
| Opel Zafira | | Germany | Van | Croatian Government leased a large number of Opel Zafira vans in 2024 after the lease ended for Renault Master vans, used in transportation roles. |

=== Motorcycles ===
| Model | Image | Origin | Type | Calibre | Quantity | Notes |
|---|---|---|---|---|---|---|
| BMW R 1250 RT-P | | Germany | Police motorcycle | Military police motorcycle for traffic / escort | (Unknown) | Successor of the BMW K1100LT that was in service prior to 2019. |
| Yamaha XT350 | | Japan | Enduro off-road motorcycle | Reconnaissance / military police | (Unknown) | |
| Kawasaki KLR 250 | | Japan | Enduro off-road motorcycle | Reconnaissance / military police | (Unknown) | |

== Military camps and facilities ==
=== Medical facilities ===
| Model | Image | Origin | Type | Quantity | Notes |
|---|---|---|---|---|---|
| Role 2B field hospital | | United States | Field hospital | 1 | Purchased in 2021 (US$6.07 million). The Role 2B is a surgery / transfusion capable hospital closer to the battlefield. |

=== Camp facilities ===
| Model | Image | Origin | Type | Quantity | Notes |
|---|---|---|---|---|---|
| Alaska-type tents | | United States | Military tents | 50 (estimate) | Large number of field army tents purchased and donated by United States over the years. |
| Force Provider Expeditionary | | United States | Field kitchen | 1 | Donated by the United States for the Croatian Army engineering regiment, along with other equipments (engineering machines, trucks), and it supports partially the Croatian UN military peace keeping missions. |

== Air defence ==
Croatian Army plans to purchase of short and medium range surface to air missile batteries with Mistral 3 missiles already added to the Army's inventory. Army plans to purchase up to 5 batteries of medium range surface to air batteries. Three European systems are being considered, NASAMS III/ER, Mica VL/NG and IRIS-T SLM as likely contenders however Mica VL/NG is rumoured to be the most likely candidate, due to the Croatian Air Force recent purchase of Dassault Rafale fighter aircraft. The Croatian Army plans to acquire up to five surface to air batteries in a deal worth around ~€500 million.

Long range air defence is yet to be decided on, however with recent purchase of Mistral ER and very likely Mica VL NG, it would not be unusual if Croatia opted for Aster SAMP/T NG long range air defence systems when it becomes available, however any purchase of such air defence system would happen in late 2020s.

Army plans to purchase 4 anti drone batteries C-UAS valued at €125 million. Plan is to acquire 4 batteries, two stationed protecting two air force bases and two mobile batteries. A framework Agreement with Končar d.d. was reached for equipping the Croatian Armed Forces with an SKYctrl anti-drone protection system.

| Model | Image | Origin | Type | Quantity | Notes |
|---|---|---|---|---|---|
| 9K32 Strela-2M | | Soviet Union Yugoslavia | Man-portable air-defense system | 500~ | System operational until large missile stocks are depleted. Unknown quantities donated to Ukraine. |
| Mistral 3 | | France | Short range air defense | 70~ | Procurement approved by Government of Croatia on 8 December 2022. Procurement to be finalized by the end of 2025. |
| Strijela - 10CROA1 | | Croatia | Short range air defense | 6 | Domestically produced wheeled version of the Soviet 9K35 Strela-10 system incorporating some improvements. |
| 9K35 Strela-10 | | Soviet Union | Short range air defense | 3 | Seen on military parade in 2025. |
| BOV 20/3 | | Yugoslavia | Self-propelled anti-aircraft gun | 42 | Triple M55 20mm anti-aircraft guns mounted on a BOV APC. The systems are to remain in service (in 7 batteries, each with 6 vehicles). |

== Unmanned aerial systems ==
=== Attack drones and loitering munitions ===
| Model | Image | Origin | Type | Calibre | Quantity | Notes |
|---|---|---|---|---|---|---|
| Orqa MRM2-10 | | Croatia | Multicopter, mini-FPV drone | Attack / anti-tank | 200,000+/annually | Purchase initiated in 2023. |

=== Surveillance, reconnaissance, observation target acquisition UAS ===
| Model | Image | Origin | Type | Calibre | Quantity | Notes |
|---|---|---|---|---|---|---|
| Aeronautics Orbiter 3b | | Israel | Fixed-wing, forward-looking infrared, mini unmanned aerial vehicle | Intelligence, surveillance, target acquisition, and reconnaissance | 6 | First 6 ordered in early 2018. Additional expected later on. |
| Elbit Skylark I | | Israel | Fixed-wing low altitude mini unmanned aerial vehicle | Intelligence, surveillance, target acquisition, and reconnaissance | Unknown | One was lost by the Croatian Army. |
| AeroVironment RQ-20 Puma | | United States | Fixed-wing low altitude mini unmanned aerial vehicle | Intelligence, surveillance, target acquisition, and reconnaissance | Unknown | Displayed in 2024/25. |
| DJI Mavic / Inspire | | China | Mini unmanned aerial vehicle, multicopter | Observation | Unknown | Used at the moment for close range observation, and natural catastrophe support. |

== Future equipment ==
=== Infantry weapons ===
| Model | Image | Origin | Type | Quantity | Notes |
|---|---|---|---|---|---|
| Spike SR | | IsraelGermany | Anti-tank guided missile | (Unknown) | €13 million budget. |
| Spike LR2 | | IsraelGermany | Anti-tank guided missile | (Unknown) | Integrated Control Launch Unit (ICLU). |

=== Artillery ===
| Model | Image | Origin | Type | Quantity | Notes |
|---|---|---|---|---|---|
| CAESAR Mk2 | | France | Self-propelled howitzer 155 mm, L/52 | 18 | A framework agreement was signed in June 2024 for the joint procurement of the CAESAR. The budget was approved in October 2025 to order 18 howitzers (budget €320 million), the contract was signed in December 2025, delivery planned for 2029. |
| VBMR-L Serval | | France | Command and control / Artillery observer armoured vehicle | 15 | Croatia signed the contract for the order of 18 CAESAR 6×6 MkII and 15 VBMR-L Serval armoured vehicles in December 2025. |
| M142 HIMARS | | United States | Multiple launch rocket system | 8 | Sale approved for 8 M142 HIMARS with a budget of USD $390 million, this includes: 24 × 6 M30A2 (GMLRS-AW); 24 × 6 M31A2 (GMLRS-HE with IMPS); 2 M1152 NG SECM mobile workshops; 8 command and control HMMWV; Budget approved in December 2024. |
| K239 Chunmoo | | South Korea | Multiple launch rocket system | 18 | Procurement of Chunmoo self-propelled rocket launchers with accompanying assets and systems. To replace the army’s aging Vulkan and APR-40. To be acquired 2026-2029. |
| CTM-290 | | South Korea | Tactical ballistic missile | Dozens | Tactical ballistic missile acquired in September 2026 as part of the new long-range artillery procurement contract. The missile is launched from the K239 platform and features a precision strike range exceeding 300 km. |
| CTM-X | | South Korea | Tactical ballistic missile | - | Purchase of Extended-Range CTM-X missile up to 500km was announced by the prime minister of Croatia. |
| GMLRS-ER | | United States | Extended-range guided rocket | Dozens | Defence Minister Ivan Anušić announced the procurement of GMLRS-ER missiles with a strike range of 150 km for the M142 HIMARS platform. |

=== Vehicles ===
| Model | Image | Origin | Type | Quantity | Notes |
|---|---|---|---|---|---|
| Leopard 2A8 | | Germany | MBT Main battle tank | 44 | In November 2024, Croatia decided to join the Leopard 2A8 programme with Germany, at that time, Croatia planned to purchase 50 tanks. They will replace the M-84 A4 Sniper. In November 2025, the budget of €1.3 billion for their purchase was approved by the parliament. Their funding will be made through the SAFE EU loans. The contract was signed in December 2025. The delivery is planned for 2028 to 2030 (with the first 6 tanks in 2028 and 19 tanks in 2029 and 2030). The contract amounts to 1.484 billion with simulators, and warranty services. |
| Patria CRO 30L | | Finland Croatia (assembly) | IFV Wheeled Infantry fighting vehicle's | 30 | In March 2023, the budget to procure additional Patria AMV's with UT30 Mk2 turrets was approved. 30 are planned by 2028, in the infantry fighting vehicle variant. Budget: €158 million |

=== Air defence ===
| Model | Image | Origin | Type | Quantity | Notes |
|---|---|---|---|---|---|
| SKYctrl anti-drone | – | Croatia | C-UAS system Counter unmanned air system | 4 | Notes To be supplied by the Končar Group to the army between 2026 and 2029. The budget for the purchase is €125 million. It includes: 2 stationary systems (critical infrastructure); 2 mobile systems |

== Potential future equipment ==
=== Air defence ===
==== Anti-drone systems ====
- DOK-ING KOMODO with Valhalla turret Mangart-25 anti air robot
- Domestic drone production has been initiated in the wake of Russian invasion of Ukraine, a number of domestic companies are involved and number of systems have been purchased from various domestic manufacturers. Croatian Army plans to purchase large quantity of domestic drones Orqa SPV-MRM-2-Interceptor drones that are currently being tested in Ukraine by the Ukrainian Army.

==== Missile systems ====
Medium range, short-term plan to introduce medium-range surface-to-air batteries by 2028, the options include:

- MICA NG VL, preferred system due to its compatibility with the Rafale fighters in service with the Croatian Air Force
- IRIS-T SLM, as neighbouring Slovenia purchased three batteries of IRIS-T SLM
- NASAMS 3
- M-SAM II, Croatia is said to be in talks with LIG Defense & Aerospace over the system

Medium-to-long range systems planned to be introduced as the country lacks an adequate protection system and it is a priority. The options include:

- Aster SAMP/T NG
- MIM-104 Patriot PAC-3
- L-SAM

== Equipment withdrawn from service or in storage ==
=== Infantry weapons ===
- Pistols:
  - Zastava M57
  - HS Produkt PHP
  - HS Produkt HS95
- Submachine guns:
  - Zastava M84
  - MGV-176
  - Zagi M-91
  - Pleter 91
  - HS Produkt ALKA M-93
  - Agram 2000
  - Arma ERO - replaced with Kuna submachine gun.
  - Heckler & Koch MP5 - replaced with Kuna submachine gun.
- Assault rifles:
  - APS-95 - adopted in limited numbers, retired.
  - Vektor R4 - small batches bought in 1991, retired.
  - FN FAL - 5,000 were stored to be sold off but donated to Ukraine.
  - AKM - Romanian, Hungarian and Chinese variants, retired after war.
  - Zastava M70 - withdrawn from use by the end of 2018, with 40,000 rifles planned for the strategic reserve, but 20,000 donated to Ukraine in 2022.
  - Zastava M59/66 - after the war only used as a ceremonial rifle.
- Machine guns:
  - Heckler & Koch HK21 - retired after supplementing Croatian army with new infantry squad machine guns.
  - Ultimax 100 - withdrawn from service or in storage (new infantry squad machine guns in service).
  - Zastava M72 - withdrawn from service or in storage (new infantry squad machine guns in service).
  - Zastava M53 - retired after the war.
  - Zastava M84 - withdrawn from service or in storage (new infantry squad machine guns in service).
- Precision rifles:
  - Zastava M76 - replaced by SAKO rifles.
  - Type 79/85 - used by special forces, retired.
  - Elmech EM 992 - replaced by SAKO rifles.
  - Metallic RT-20 - replaced by MACS M4.
  - MACS M2
  - MACS M3 - replaced by MACS M4.
- Anti-tank weapons:
  - RPG-7 - phased out.
  - M80 Zolja (RPG) - phased out (low stock).
  - M79 Osa - retired.
  - MILAN - retired.

=== Indirect fire ===
- Towed artillery:
  - CITER 155mm L33 Gun - none in active service due to NATO interoperability issues.
  - M-46 (M1954) - none in active service due to NATO interoperability issues.
  - M-84 Nora - none in active service due to NATO interoperability issues.
  - M101 - none in active service due to NATO interoperability issues.
  - M115 - retired.
- Rocket artillery:
  - M-63 Plamen - retired due to lack of ammunition and costly upkeep.
  - M-87 Orkan - 260mm MRL, captured during Battle of the Barracks in 1991.
  - M-94 'Plamen S - 128mm MRL as it was no longer fit for service.
  - RAK-12 - systems in storage.

=== Vehicles ===
- Tanks:
  - M-47 Patton - retired, 2 are exposed in local army museums, others are used for target practice.
  - M36 tank destroyer - retired.
  - T-34-85 - retired.
  - T-55A - 280 withdrawn from 2006 to 2009 (in between a dozen used for training), the lack of budget pushed them for retirement, they are awaiting disposal.
  - PT-76 - retired
- Tracked armoured vehicles:
  - M60P / M60 SAN - retired, and 2 are exposed in local army museums.
  - MT-LB - retired and replaced by the Patria AMV CRO, 2 are exposed in local army museums, the rest was scrapped.
  - SNAR-10 - retired.
- Wheeled armoured vehicles:
  - LOV-1 - retired.
  - BOV POLO M-83 - placed in reserve
  - BRDM-2 - retired, and some are exposed in local army museums.
  - BTR-60 - retired, and 2 are exposed in local army museums.
- Engineering equipment:
  - M-91 Straško - on display at the Museum of Homeland War in Turanj.
- Unmanned aerial vehicles:
  - M-99 Bojnik - retired.
  - MAH-1
  - MAH-2

=== Air defence ===
- Medium range missile air defence systems:
  - S-300PMU-1 - acquired from Ukraine in 1994, exposed in 1995 during a military parade held in Zagreb. It is believed that the system was never fully completed and operational although the training of crews was held as late as 1998. Some sources claim that the weapon was subsequently handed-over to the United States or Israel in 2002–2004. However, officials still claim that the system is still stored somewhere in Croatia and the exact fate of the system is to this day classified.
- Very short range missile systems:
  - 9K38 Igla - replaced by the Mistral 3.
  - 9K34 Strela 3 - retired.
  - 9K33 Osa - retired.
- Anti-aircraft guns:
  - Bofors 40 mm Automatic Gun L/70 - retired.
  - M53/59 Praga - retired, and 2 are exposed in local army museums.
  - ZSU-57-2 - retired and used as target practice.
  - Zastava M55 - retired.
