= OT M-60 =

Yugoslav armoured personnel carrier

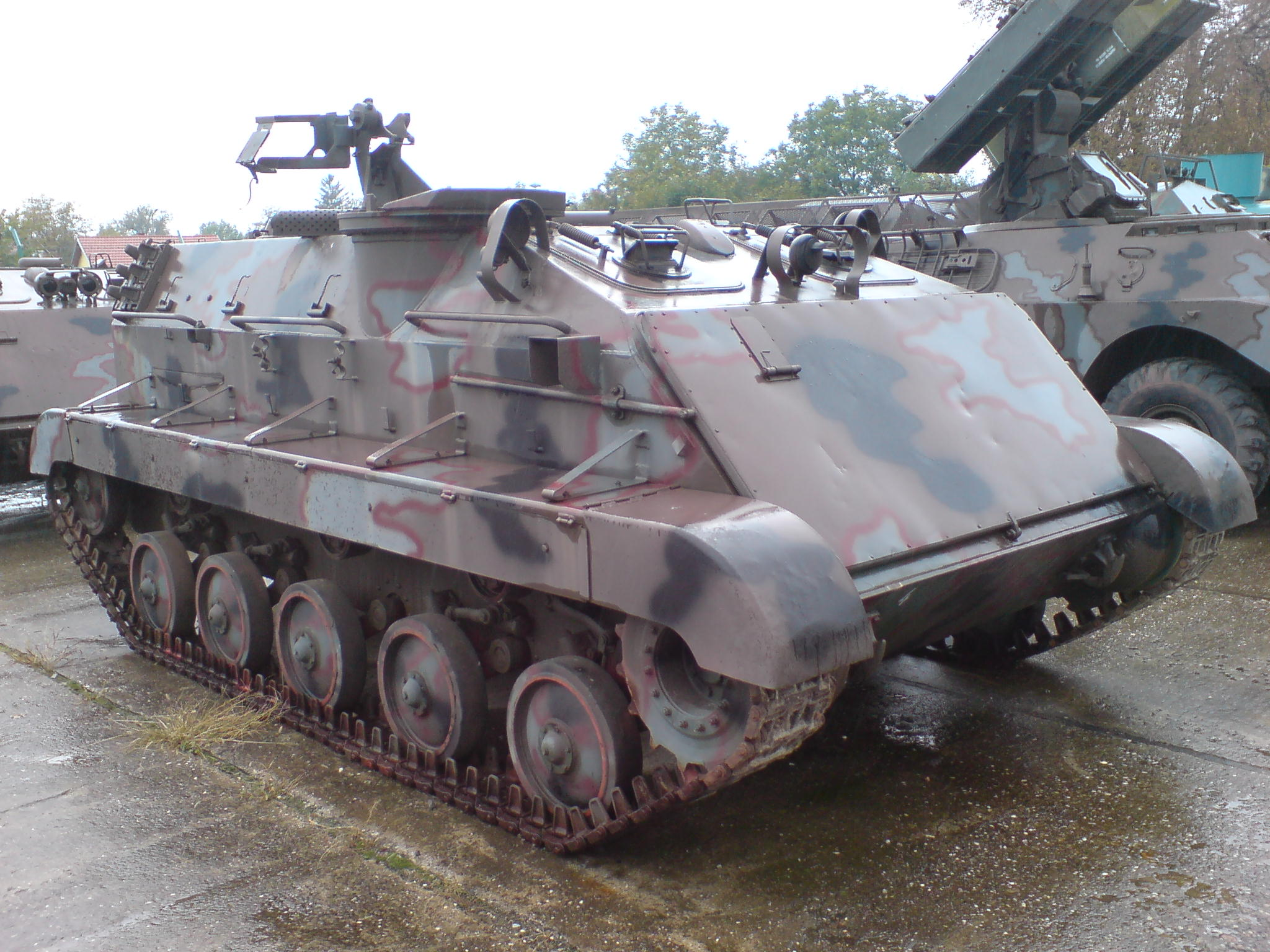
- An OT M-60P
- Type: Armoured personnel carrier
- Place of origin: Yugoslavia

Service history
- In service: 1962–2004
- Used by: See Former operators
- Wars: Iran–Iraq War; Yugoslav Wars

Production history
- Designer: Military Technical Institute

Specifications
- Mass: 11,000 kg
- Length: 5.02 meters
- Width: 2.77 meters
- Height: 2.385 meters with 12.7 mm MG 1.86 meters without 12.7 mm MG
- Crew: 3
- Armor: 10–25 mm
- Main armament: 12.7 mm M2 HB Browning heavy machine gun
- Secondary armament: coaxial 7.92 M53 machine-gun 2,000 rounds
- Engine: Famos FFTR; 150 hp
- Power/weight: 17,3 hp/tonne
- Suspension: torsion bar
- Operational range: 400 km on road 250 km off road
- Maximum speed: 45 km/h on land 8 km/h in water

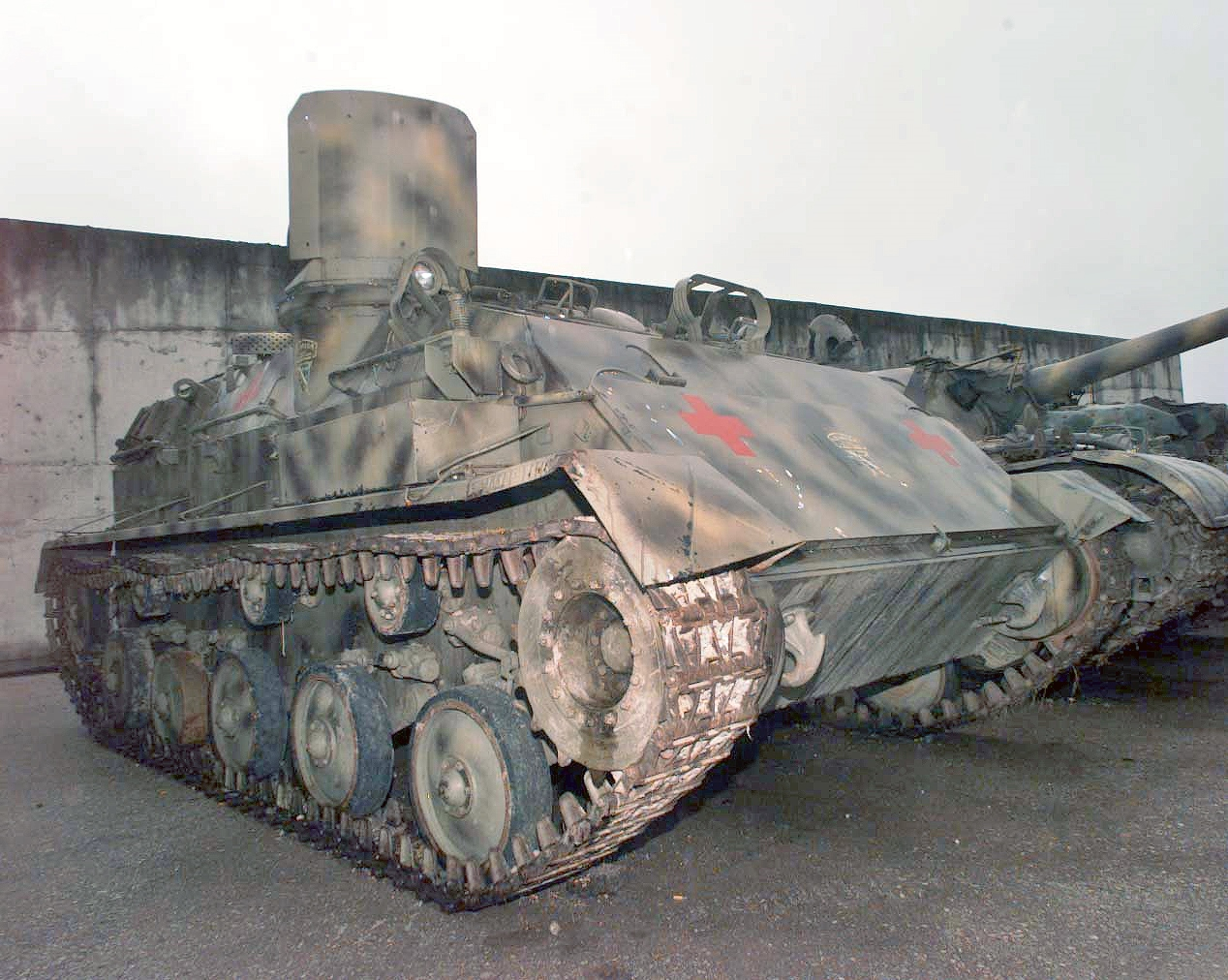
M-60P armoured personnel carrier of Army of the Republic of Bosnia and Herzegovina in ambulance role.

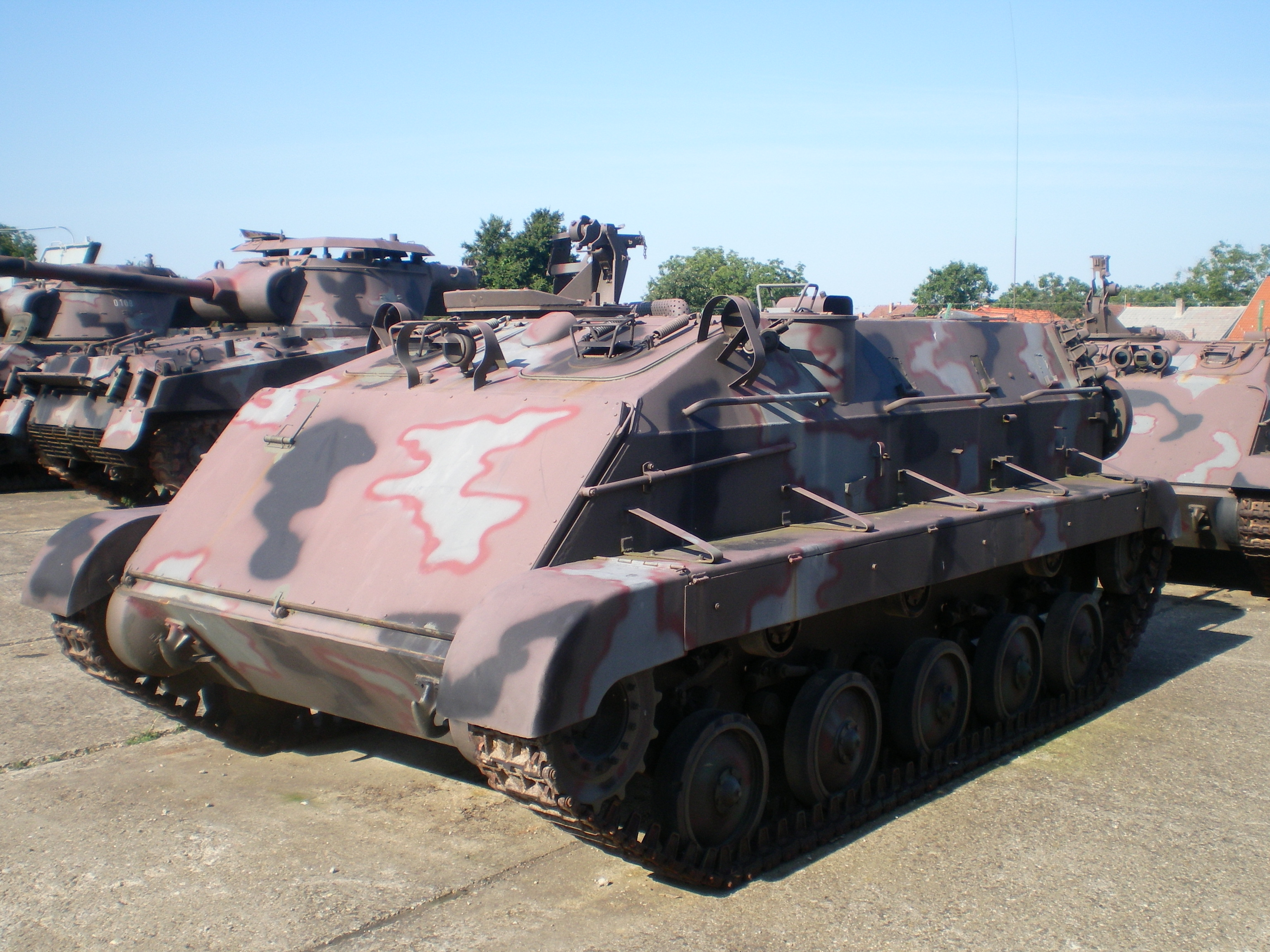
Croatian army M-60P armoured personnel carrier at the Vukovar war museum.

The OT M-60 is a Yugoslav armoured personnel carrier produced from 1962 to 1979.

== Development ==
The OT (Oklopni transporter - armoured personnel carrier) M-60 was the first Yugoslav armored vehicle to enter serial production. Research and development began in 1956, and the first prototype was produced in June 1958. Prior to the commencement of serial production, the new armored personnel carrier was known as Objekat M-590. Serial production started in 1962. The M-60 first appeared in public in that year's Victory Day parade. The quality of the vehicles did not satisfy the requirements of the Yugoslav People's Army (JNA), so FAMOS began development of an upgraded model, OT M-60P (P – poboljšani – "improved") which was introduced in 1970. From 1962 to 1979, around 790 vehicles were produced, of which 190 were exported. An anti-tank variant with two 82 mm M60 recoilless guns was introduced in 1973.

Most M-60s were used in the JNA's armored and mechanized brigades, while a number were used by the Federal Police, being painted in a characteristic blue color. During the Iran–Iraq War, the M-60 was criticised for its low firepower and weak armor. During the Yugoslav Wars, the M-60 suffered serious losses, and its firepower deficiencies were once again noted. Later during the war, the M-60 was used as armoured personnel carrier (APC) for transporting ammunition to the front line and the evacuation of infantrymen and wounded combatants. The M-60 was used by almost all armies created as a result of the breakup of Yugoslavia. The Army of Serbia and Montenegro withdrew its last 121 M-60Ps from service in 2004 due to the Agreement on Sub-Regional Arms Control of 1996.

Although the M-60 was generally similar to the other APCs of the period, it never managed to meet all the criteria originally required by the JNA. Despite its disadvantages, it was widely used in the 40 years after it entered mass production and resulted in the mass mechanization of the JNA. Its deficiencies were later compensated for with the introduction of the BVP M-80 infantry fighting vehicle.

== Characteristics ==
The driver sat to the front left, his hatch having a day sight which could be replaced with an infrared sight for night driving. To his right sat the radio operator, who was able to fire through a machine gun port located on the upper front plate. The commander sat behind the driver, while behind the radio operator sat the gunner. The vehicle was equipped with a 12.7 mm M-2 HB PAM machine-gun mounted on the cupola, allowing for anti-aircraft use.

The vehicle is powered by a six-cylinder diesel engine, which generates 140 hp, giving a top road speed of 45 km/h. The vehicle is an all welded steel construction, which gives protection against small arms. It has no NBC protection system.

The rear compartment allows for 10 troops to be carried. These sit on benches back-to-back so that they can fire their personal weapons through side ports (three on either side), and they depart the vehicle via two doors set in the rear.

== Variants ==
- M-60 – First production model, also known as M-590
- M-60P – Improved model (P stands for poboljšani, or improved)
- M-60PB – Anti-tank variant with twin 82 mm M - 60 recoilless rifles mounted on the top left or top right of hull at rear.
- M-60PK – Battalion commander's vehicle
- M-60SN – Medical evacuation variant with lengthened hull

== Former operators ==
- Bosnia and Herzegovina
- Croatia
- Iraq – 190 M-60P armoured personnel carriers ordered and delivered before 1990. Withdrawn from service.
- Republika Srpska
- Republic of Serbian Krajina
- Serbia and Montenegro
- Yugoslavia – about 600 vehicles in various variants delivered from 1962 to 1979. Passed on to successor states.
