= HIAV M-91 Straško =

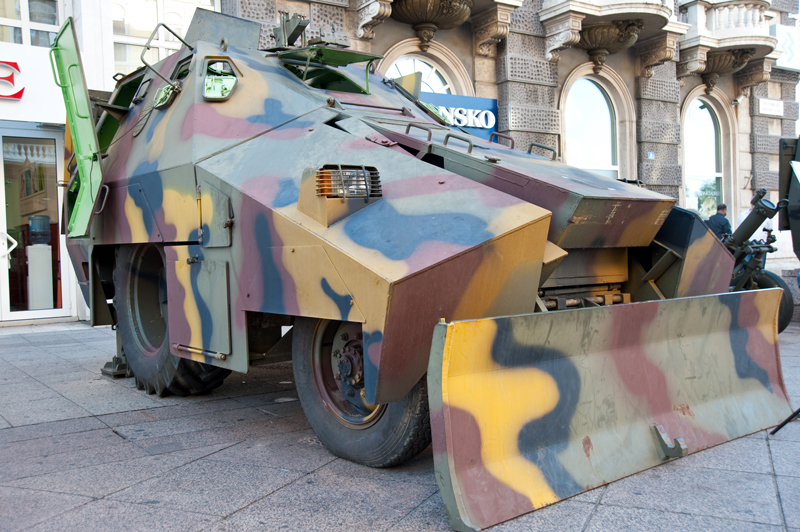
- Type: Armored Engineering Vehicle
- Place of origin: Croatia

Service history
- In service: 1990s
- Used by: Croatian armed forces
- Wars: Croatian War of Independence

Production history
- Manufacturer: Torpedo-Rijeka
- No. built: 2+15

Specifications
- Mass: 9,200 kg
- Armor: 6-15 mm
- Main armament: 82 mm M60 recoilless gun, 20 mm M55 anti-aircraft cannon, 12.7 mm heavy machine gun, 7.92 mm M53 machine gun
- Engine: 70 hp

The HIAV M‑91 Straško (Croatian: Hrvatsko Inženjersko Antiterorističko Vozilo – HIAV, English: Croatian Engineering Anti‑terror Vehicle) is a Croatian armoured engineering vehicle developed in 1991 by Torpedo Tvornica Rijeka during the Croatian War of Independence. The name ‘Straško’ can be roughly translated as 'the Terrible' or 'the Dreadful'. Based on a backhoe loader chassis, it was fitted with steel armour and a rotating turret capable of mounting various weapons, including a 82 mm M60 recoilless gun, a 20 mm M55 anti‑aircraft cannon, a .50-cal-Browning M2 and a 7.92 mm M53 machine gun.

The vehicle could transport up to six infantrymen with personal arms or three stretchers and was equipped for engineering tasks like obstacle removal. A small series of 15 units was produced, and some examples survive in museums or private collections.
