= Zagi M-91 =

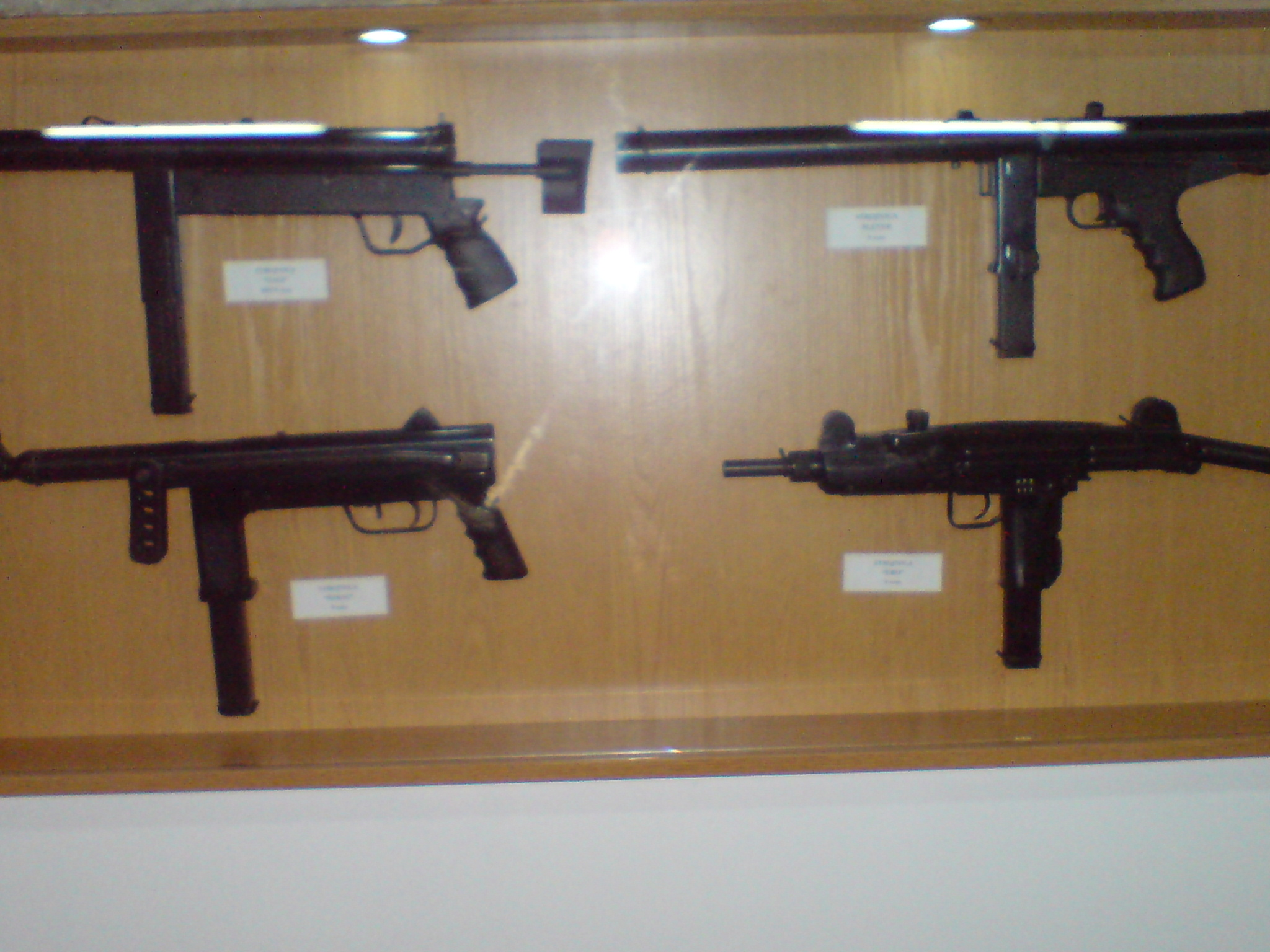
- Zagi M91, upper left
- Type: Submachine gun
- Place of origin: Croatia

Service history
- In service: 1991-?
- Used by: Croatia
- Wars: Yugoslav Wars

Production history
- Designed: 1991
- Manufacturer: Likaweld, Zagreb
- Produced: 1991-?

Specifications
- Mass: 3.41 kg
- Length: stock retracted 565mm / stock extended 850mm
- Barrel length: 220mm
- Cartridge: 9×19mm Parabellum
- Caliber: 9 mm
- Action: Blowback, open bolt
- Rate of fire: 700 rpm
- Feed system: 32-round box magazine
- Sights: Iron sights

Zagi M-91 is a submachine gun created in 1991, when the dissolution of Yugoslavia left Croatia with few or no weapons to arm their military in the time of Croatian War of Independence. Since the embargo prevented the newly formed state from legally buying equipment abroad, they had no choice but to design new weapons locally. This gun was produced by LIKAWELD, now bankrupt machine tools factory based in Zagreb, also called the "First Croatian Weapons Factory", PHTO (Prva Hrvatska Tvornica Oružja).

The name of the gun likely relates to Zagi - squirrel mascot of XIV Summer Universiade that was held in Zagreb, in 1987.

Weapon's mechanism is based on Sten submachine gun, famous for its simplicity of production Magazine is based on the MP40, dual stack, single feed magazine. Extending stock resembles one used in Grease gun. However, unlike its World War II predecessors, it features partially plastic receiver/handle. The guns were of uneven quality and proved unreliable, so their production was soon discontinued.

Some of these guns ended up as military aid in 1992 in Bosnia and Herzegovina after the war started there, and were used by Bosnian army forces, desperately in need of the weapons. They copied the gun (with some small modifications, such as using the wooden lower receiver/handle instead of the original plastic one) and produced it in Pobjeda factory in town Goražde, calling it "Bosanski Zagi" (Bosnian Zagi), in apparently very small numbers.

== See also ==
- Pleter 91, another "homemade" Croatian firearm.
