= Zastava M87 =

M87 12.7 mm Heavy Machine gun
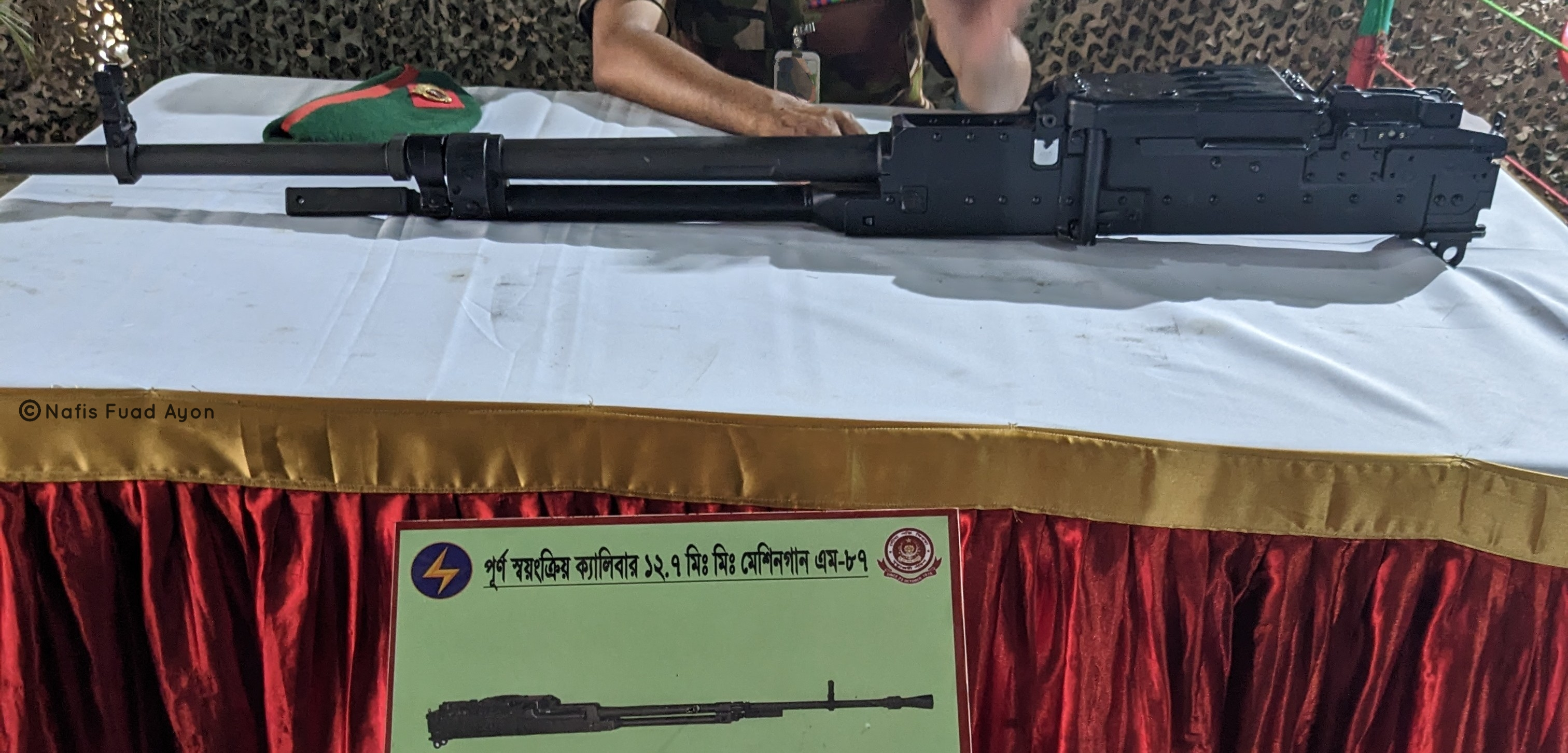
- Zastava M87 heavy machine gun of the Bangladesh Army on display.
- Type: Heavy machine gun
- Place of origin: Yugoslavia

Service history
- In service: 1987–present
- Used by: Bangladesh, Serbia and Liberia

Production history
- Designer: Zastava Arms

Specifications
- Mass: 25 kg (55 lb)
- Length: 1,560 mm (61 in)
- Barrel length: 1,100 mm (43 in)
- Cartridge: 12.7 x 108 mm
- Caliber: 12.7 mm (0.50 in)
- Barrels: 1
- Action: Gas-operated
- Rate of fire: 700 round/min
- Muzzle velocity: 845 m/s (2,770 ft/s)
- Effective firing range: 2,000 m (2,200 yd)
- Feed system: Belts in 60 round boxes

The Zastava M87 (Serbian: Застава М87) is a heavy machine gun produced by Zastava Arms. The M87 is based on the Soviet NSV heavy machine gun.

It is intended for anti-aircraft duties, but it also used for action against ground and maritime targets at long distances.

== Users ==
=== Current users ===
- Bangladesh
- Croatia
- Liberia
- Serbia

=== Former users ===
- Serbia and Montenegro
- Yugoslavia

== See also ==
- Zastava M84
- Zastava M02 Coyote
