= Strijela – 10CROA1 =

Strijela – 10CROA1 (SLRS S-10CRO A1) is a Croatian-made self-propelled surface-to-air missile system of the Croatian Army for air defense of Croatian Army units and installations from low-flying aircraft and helicopters. It is a domestically produced version of the Russian 9K35 Strela-10 system incorporating some improvements.

The system is mounted on an armored chassis of the TAM-150 6x6 truck which gives it a somewhat more practical usage. This alteration was a result of a complete shortage of MT-LB units during the Croatian War of Independence and on which these systems were usually installed. Today, Croatia has at least 9 systems of this type in its service. However, at least 3 units are now mounted on previously mentioned MT-LB armored personnel carriers.

The system is still being produced and developed by Croatian firms and is till actively marketed for export. According to the long-term defence plan, three additional units are to be produced for the Croatian military by 2012 but this number might increase. New units are to be further modernized and will incorporate additional improvements which will be retrofitted on all existing systems. After the completion of all units is over, S-10CROs are to be integrated on hulls of vastly more modern Patria AMV APCs.

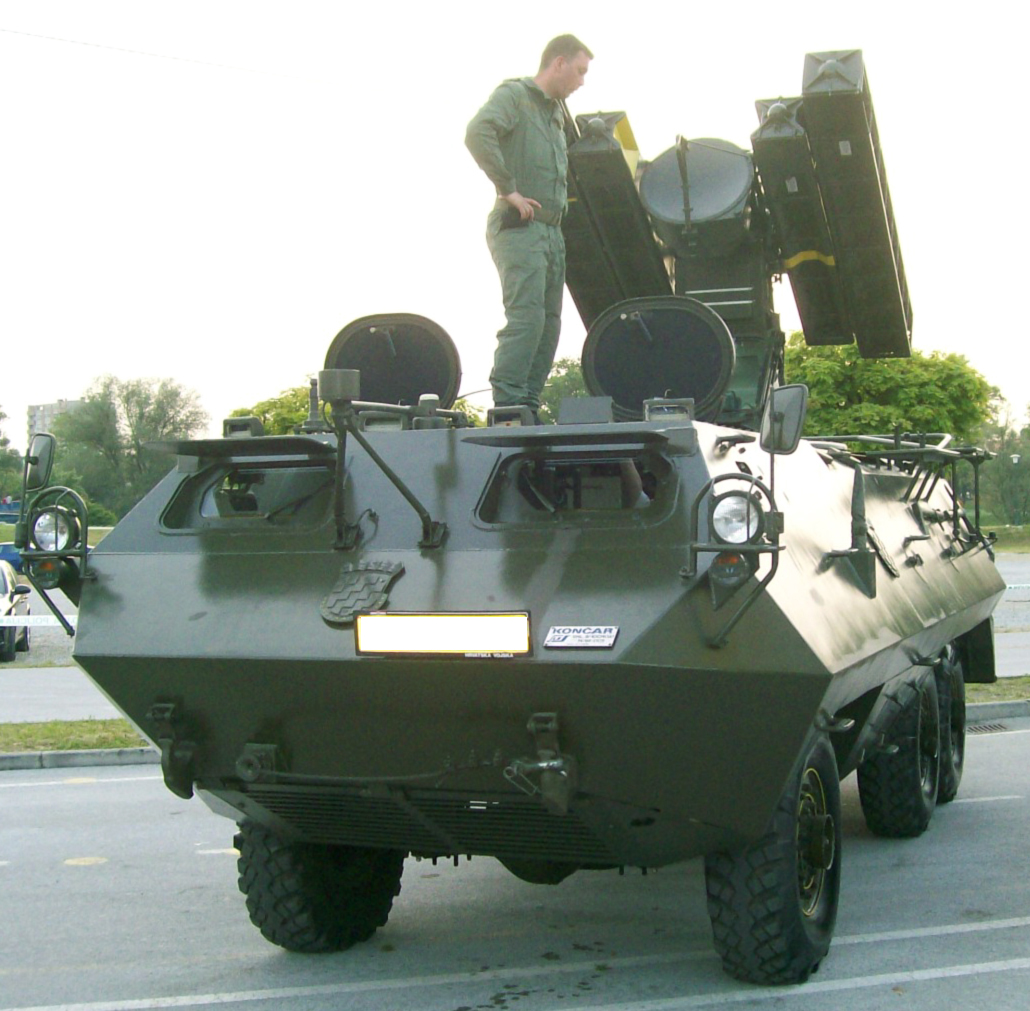

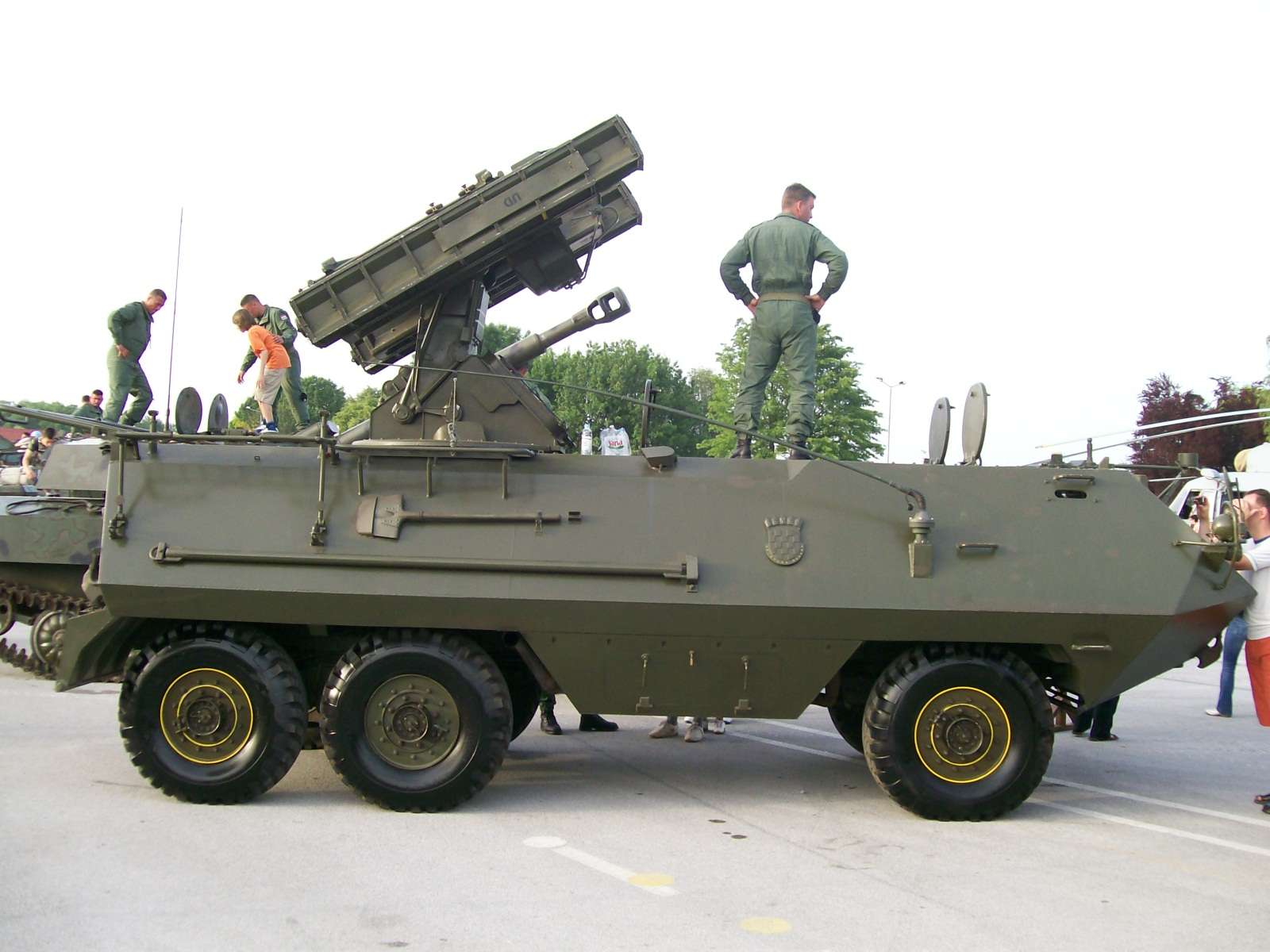

== Features ==
- Length: 7300 mm
- Width: 2700 mm
- Weight: 10800 kg
- Height:
  - in the driving position: : 2400 mm
  - in battle position: 3635 mm
- Speed:
  - On-road: do 90 km/h
  - Off-road: do 35 km/h
- Transportation features:
  - Drive: 3 shafts, 6x6
  - maximum rise: do 70%
  - overcoming obstacles: to height from 1500mm at 35%
  - side slope: do 35%
  - overcome vertical obstacles: to height 515 mm
  - overcoming the trenches: to width 600 mm
  - overcoming water obstacles: to a depth from 1000mm
- Fighting Kit: 8 missile (4 at the launchers i 4 in vehicle)
- Combat features:
  - the possibility of shooting from the position or movement at a speed of up to 30 km / h
  - the possibility of a centralized and autonomous
  - target detection and guidance on the objective observation radar system for the transmission of information, optical sensors (TV and termovision camera) on the launchers
  - objective measurement of parameters: distance, radial and angular velocity, the launch zone (radar rangefinder, powered launchers and a central computer)
  - the possibility of using different types of rockets (9M311M, 9M37, 9M37M or 9M333)
  - alone mention to the target IC / photo contrast with the actual selection of targets
  - destruct of the target: b/g with direct and laser proximity lighter
  - target height: 25–3000 m
  - sidelong distance: do 5000 m
  - targets speed in meeting : do 1500 km/h
  - targets speed be outgoing: do 1100 km /h
  - missile speed: 500 m/s
  - missile weight: 75 kg
- Crew: 3

== Sources ==
- Priča o KONČAR-SUS-u, o nastanku, razvoju i propasti Končareve tvornice oružja (4) –Ratne godine, razvoj nove Strijele-10CRO (in Croatian)
