= Pleter 91 submachine gun =

Pleter 91
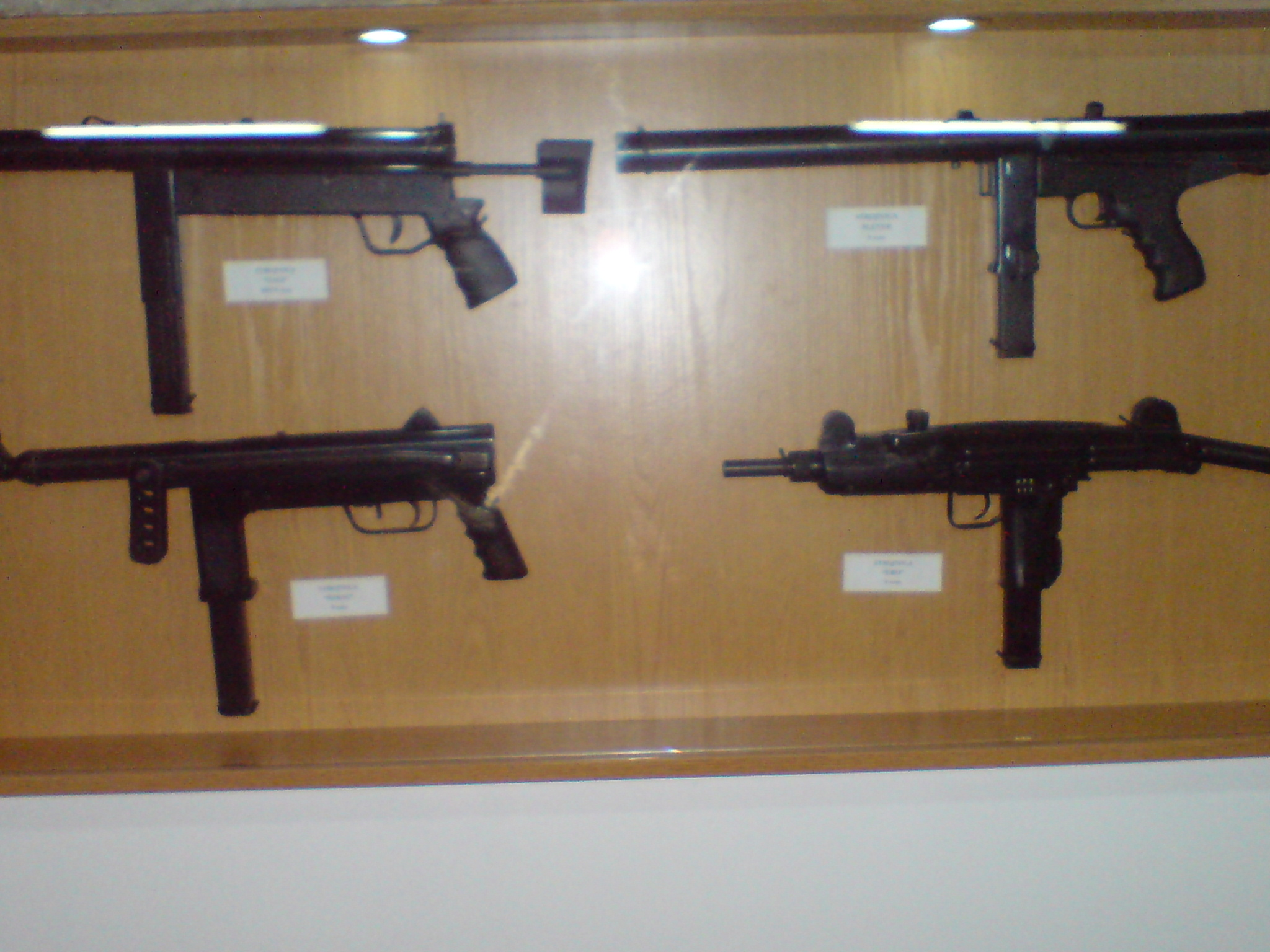
- Pleter 91, upper right
- Type: Submachine gun
- Place of origin: Croatia

Service history
- In service: 1991-?
- Used by: See users
- Wars: Yugoslav Wars

Production history
- Designed: 1991
- Manufacturer: Oroplet, Pleternica
- Produced: 1991
- No. built: 4,500
- Variants: silenced

Specifications
- Mass: 3.15 kg empty, 3.55 kg with 32 round mag
- Length: 710 mm
- Cartridge: 9×19mm Parabellum
- Caliber: 9 mm
- Action: Blowback, open bolt
- Rate of fire: 630 rounds per minute
- Muzzle velocity: 390 mps
- Feed system: 32-round magazine, Uzi type
- Sights: Front blade rear single aperture set at 100m

The Pleter submachine gun is a submachine gun created in 1991, when the Breakup of Yugoslavia left Croatia with few weapons to arm their yet to be formed military in the midst of the Croatian War of Independence. The embargo prevented the newly formed state from legally buying equipment abroad, so they chose to try to design and produce some new weapons locally, mostly based on second generation of submachine guns (like the British Sten gun or German MP40).

The Pleter (named after the Slavonian town of Pleternica) was produced in the local factory OROPLET, heavily copied Sten Gun characteristics, despite having a vertical rather than a horizontal magazine. These include the removable barrel assembly, the bolt and recoil spring, and the open bolt firing mechanism. Prototype models had handle and trigger pack covers made from wood, but in the serial production it was decided to use ones made from plastic. Barrel assembly was simplified compared to the Sten gun, it was fixed by an inbus screw, and to further simplify the construction, the safety and fire selector was omitted. It was equipped with only a simple sear/trigger/spring combination, making it open-bolt full auto only, but due to the relatively low rate of fire, a skilled operator could fire single shots by quickly pulling and releasing the trigger.

Like the Sten, the Pleter could also be fitted with a silencer, and there was a special model made with a permanently fixed silencer attached (called "Pleter 91 Prigušen", Prigušen = suppressed).

Fixed front and back sights that could not be adjusted produced some criticism from the users. The magazine well was designed to accept a direct copy of the Uzi magazine. This type of double-stack, staggered-feed type magazine is considered one of the improvements this gun has in comparison to the original STEN gun or similar ones that used double-stack, single-feed magazines, that are often more prone to jamming and harder to load. The butt stock shape was apparently influenced by another similar gun of World War II vintage, the Grease Gun.

Out of probably dozens of domestically designed and produced submachine guns from the 1991 conflict, the Pleter proved to be quite a good insurgency weapon, which somewhat filled in the gaps of the undergunned Croatian Army and was suitable for the combat environment of the Yugoslav Wars. Some examples may also have filtered into Kosovo to see action in the 1999 war. The exact number of the produced Pleter guns is not published, but the ones that were in the logistic reserves of the Croatian military were destroyed after the war in coordination with the military police, so today the weapon only exists in small numbers.

One of these guns was found 2011 in the weapons arsenal of the German Neonazi terrorist group NSU. Up to this date (2018) it is unknown how the group obtained this weapon. It is believed that, when German Neonazis fought as mercenaries in the Croatian War of Independence, some of them may brought the guns they used back home and later offered them to the group. It is known that at least two Thuringian Neonazis fought in the war and one of them had a connection to the group.

== Users ==
- Bosnia and Herzegovina
- Croatia

== See also ==
- Zagi M-91, another "homemade" Croatian firearm.
