= Elmech EM 992 =

Sniper gun produced in Croatia

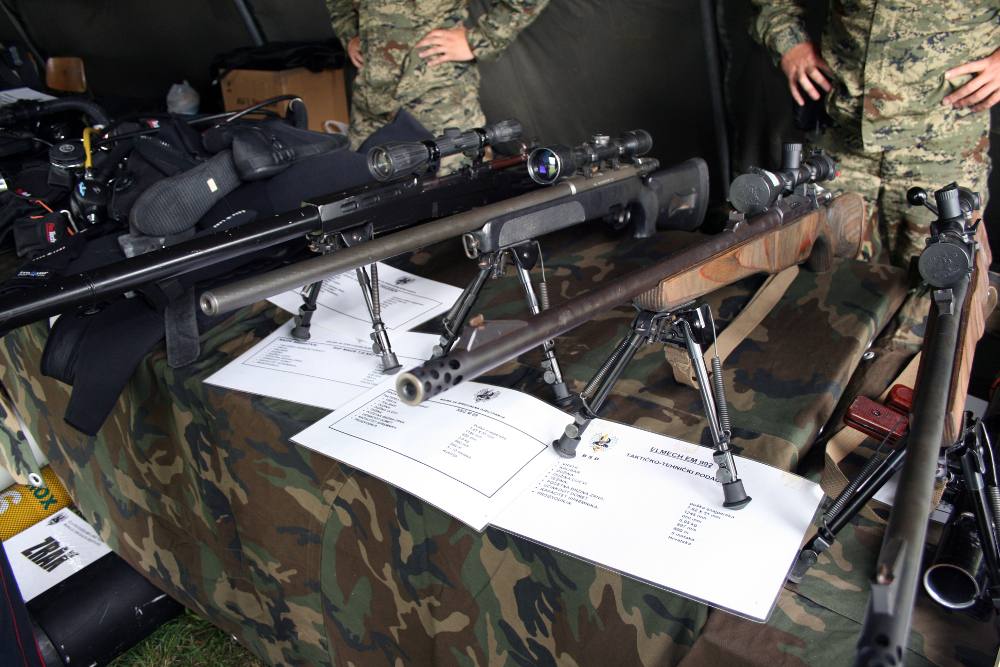
- Type: bolt-action sniper rifle
- Place of origin: Croatia

Service history
- Used by: Croatian Armed Forces; Islamic State of Iraq and Syria
- Wars: Croatian War of Independence; Syrian Civil War

Production history
- Designer: Elmech Razvoj
- Manufacturer: Elmech Razvoj
- Produced: 1991 - 1997

The Elmech EM 992 is a bolt-action sniper rifle developed in Croatia by the company Elmech Razvoj during the early 1990s. It is the first domestically produced sniper rifle produced in Croatia. It was used by the Croatian armed forces after Croatia's independence from Yugoslavia.

It is chambered in the 7.62×51mm NATO round, a version chambered in .300 Winchester Magnum was produced as the EMM 992.

== History ==
The development of the EM 992 was started in the early stage of the Croatian War of Independence. During this period, Croatia tried to establish its own arms industry. The rifles was designed and built by the company Elmech Razvoj. The snipers were then supplied to the army.

Prototype models were produced in 1991. The EM 992 entered service in 1992 and remained in production until 1997.

The rifle was used by both the Croatian military and police. Later, It was replaced by more modern snipers like the Sako TRG-42.

== Operators ==
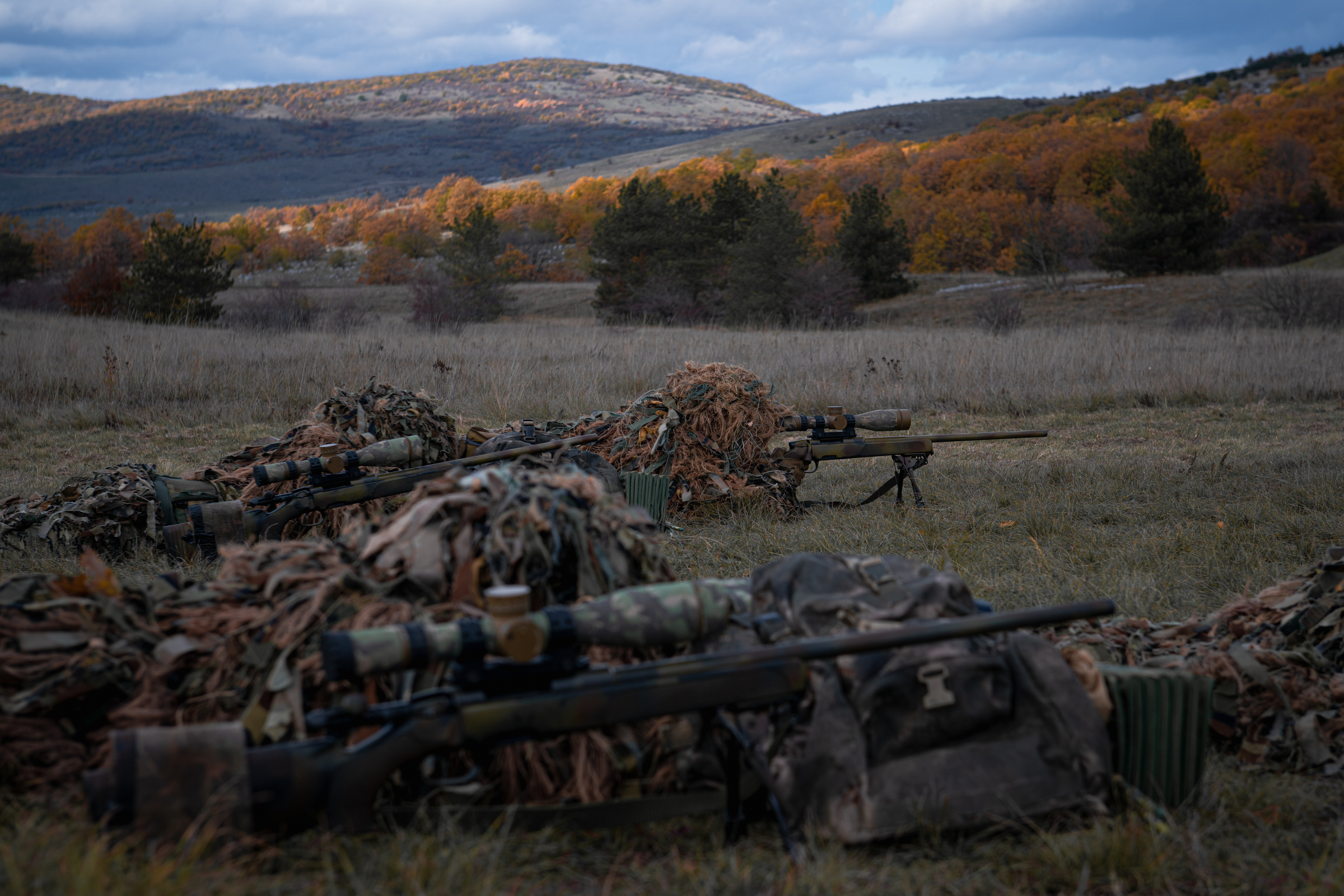
Elmech EM 992 used by the Armed Forces of Croatia.

=== State users ===
Croatia: The EM 992 was used by the Croatian military and police since 1992.

=== Non-State users ===
ISIS: The EM 992 was used by the ISIS fighters in Syria. An EM 992 was also found in Avdoké, Syria, on 13 July 2014.
