= M60 recoilless gun =

M60
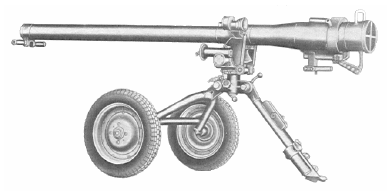
- Type: Recoilless gun
- Place of origin: Yugoslavia

Service history
- Used by: See users
- Wars: Yugoslav Wars; Syrian Civil War

Production history
- Variants: M-60A

Specifications (M-60)
- Mass: 122 kg (269 lb)
- Length: 2.2 m (7 ft 3 in)
- Crew: 5
- Shell: HE, HEAT, RAP
- Caliber: 82 mm (3.2 in)
- Elevation: -20° to +35°
- Traverse: 360°
- Rate of fire: 4 rpm
- Muzzle velocity: 388 m/s (1,270 ft/s)
- Effective firing range: 700 m (770 yd) (HEAT, moving targets); 2,000 m (2,200 yd) (HEAT, stationary targets)
- Sights: Optical (PTDM60)

The M60 recoilless gun is an 82-mm antitank recoilless gun developed in the former Yugoslavia. It entered service with the Yugoslav People's Army during the 1960s.

== Description ==
The M60 is similar to the Soviet B-10, but longer, heavier, and with a superior effective range. It can be manhandled by its crew or towed by a light truck. It can also be broken down for transport by the crew or by mule.

The M60 is mounted on a towing carriage with wheels for transport and firing. Aiming is done with an optical sight. The recoilless rifle resembles that of American counterparts. Ammunition for the M60 includes two fin-stabilized high-explosive anti-tank (HEAT) rounds. The first HEAT projectile for the M60 had an effective range of 500 meters. The second was an improved version that used a rocket booster to increase the effective range to 1,000 meters.

The maximum range of the piece is 4,700 meters. Direct fire is limited to 1,500 meters against stationary targets and 1,000 meters against moving targets. The M60 is credited with a 220mm penetration of armor with its HEAT round.

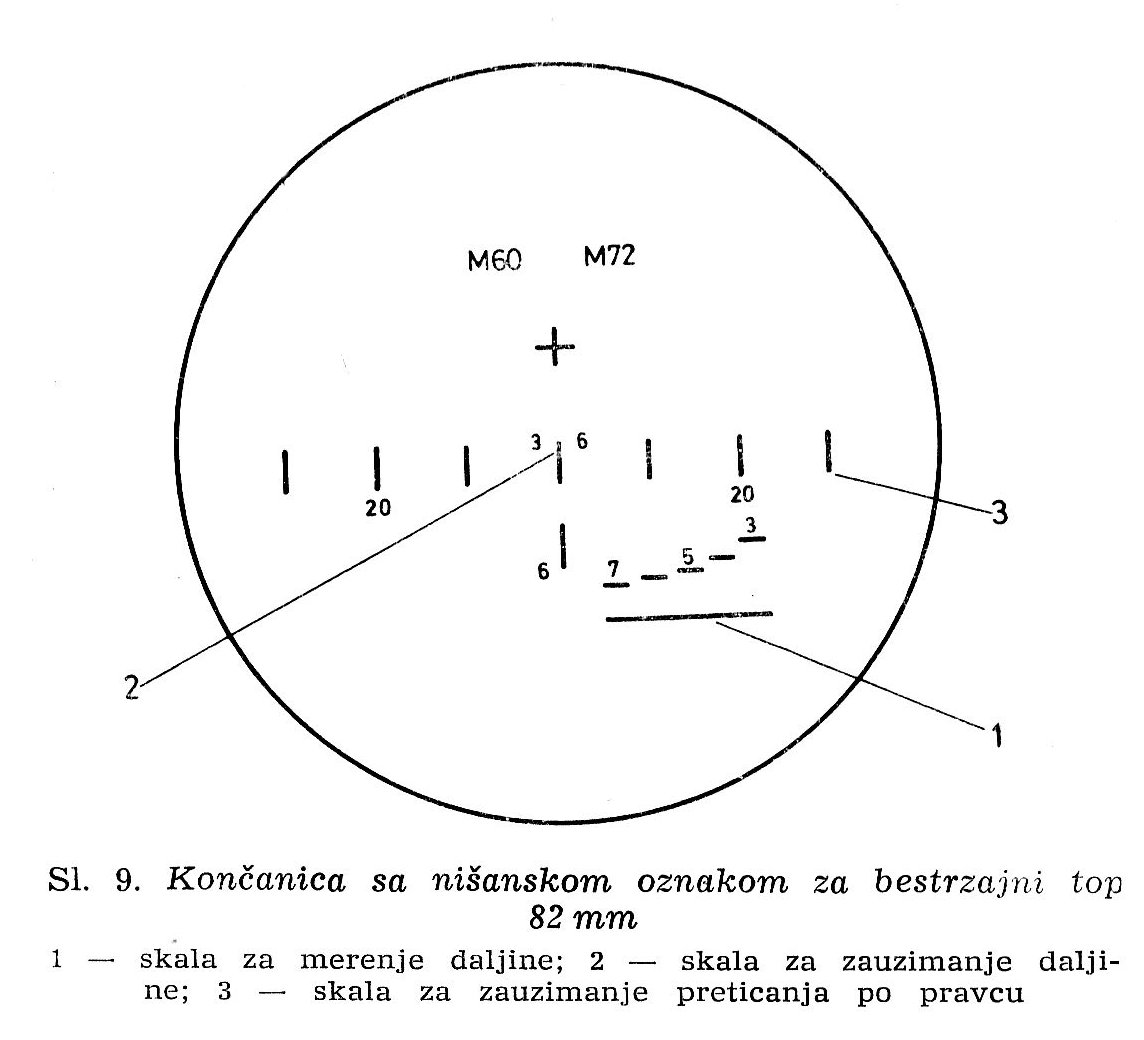
Aimsight for 82mm M60 recoilless rifle

== History ==
The M60 was used by virtually all pro and anti-Serb factions during the Bosnian War, including the Yugoslav Army, the Croatian Army, the Army of the Republic of Bosnia and Herzegovina, the Army of Republika Srpska, the Croatian Defence Council, and the Serbian Army of Krajina.

The M60 was also seen in the hands of Al-Nusra Front fighters during the Syrian Civil War. According to Small Arms Survey, these guns (alongside other Yugoslav-made anti-tank weapons) were obtained by Jordan via Croatia and transferred to the Syrian rebels between November 2012 and February 2013. Questioned about these clandestine transfers, Croatian president Ivo Josipovic stated that: "what third countries or countries that we or someone else export weapons to do with [arms] afterward, we unfortunately cannot control".

== Users ==
- Bosnia and Herzegovina − M60A, produced locally
- Croatia − Produced as the BT-82
- Herzeg-Bosnia
- Montenegro
- North Macedonia
- Republika Srpska
- Serbia
- Serbian Krajina
- Syrian opposition
- Yugoslavia
