= BVP M-80 =

Yugoslav infantry fighting vehicle

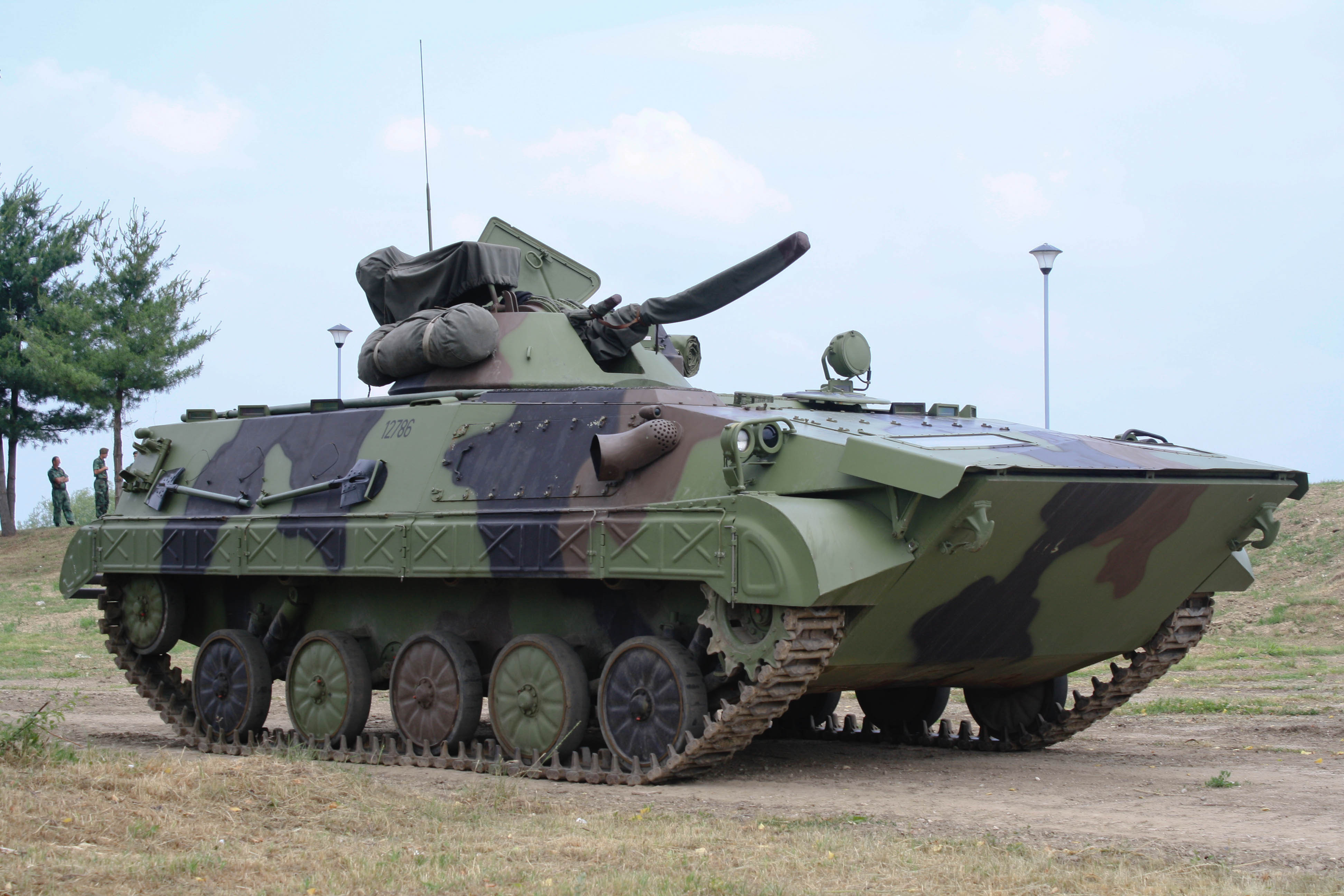
- Serbian M-80A
- Type: Infantry fighting vehicle
- Place of origin: Yugoslavia

Service history
- In service: 1979–present
- Wars: Yugoslav Wars; Russo-Ukrainian War; Russian invasion of Ukraine

Production history
- Designer: Military Technical Institute
- Designed: 1971

Specifications
- Mass: 13,850 kg
- Length: 6.42 meters
- Width: 2.9 meters
- Height: 2.2 meters
- Crew: 3+7
- Armor: Steel armour
- Main armament: 20 mm M-55 cannon 1 ATGM launcher, 2 missiles
- Secondary armament: coaxial 7.62 machine-gun 2,000 rounds
- Engine: Daimler Benz OM-403; 320 hp
- Power/weight: 22.6 hp/ton
- Suspension: torsion bar
- Operational range: 500 km
- Maximum speed: 65 km/h on land 8 km/h in water

The BVP M-80 (Serbo-Croatian: Borbeno vozilo pešadije М-80) is a Yugoslav tracked infantry fighting vehicle, produced from the 1980s until the country's collapse in the 1990s.

== Development ==
Early research and development of the BVP M-80 began in 1969, with testing of the first completed prototype taking place in 1974. The vehicle was first presented to the public in 1975. The first examples left the assembly line in 1979 but the vehicle did not fully enter into service with the Yugoslav People's Army until 1982.

The first production variant was the M-80, which was only made in small numbers. It used a French-built engine with an output of 260 hp, the same engine as used in the AMX-10P. After only one year, the Yugoslav company FAMOS began licensed production of Daimler-Benz's 315 hp engine. Vehicles powered by this engine received the new designation M-80A. Around 1,000 such vehicles were produced before the breakup of the country.

At the time of its production, the M-80A was comparable to existing IFVs, such as the Soviet BMP-1 and the French AMX-10P. Although many foreign observers compared the M-80A to the BMP-1, the Yugoslav IFV was an original design. Unlike the BMP-1, which had six road wheels and was armed with a 73 mm gun, the M-80A had five road wheels and had a 20 mm gun. The M-80A incorporated many elements from the AMX-10P, giving it more power and better protection over its counterpart. All M-80s are amphibious and equipped with twin 9K11 Malyutka (AT-3 Sagger) anti-tank guided missile launchers.

The BVP M-80 was used extensively during the Yugoslav Wars.

== Characteristics ==
The M-80A is armed with one 20 mm gun, co-axial machine gun 7.62 mm and twin launcher for wire-guided anti-tank missiles. It is NBC protected, fire suppression system, inside heating and water ejecting system. It is fully amphibious and can perform crossing of any water barrier without previous preparations. Max. speed at water is 7 km/h. Crew consist of three, driver, commander and gun operator and in the after compartment, there is space for six fully equipped infantrymen who can engage the enemy with personal armament through six gun slits on both vehicle sides and back doors and one squad leader who commands infantry upon exiting the vehicle. Infantry leaves IFV through two doors at the back of the vehicle.

The standard BVP M-80 and M-80A variants mount a Hispano-Suiza HS.804 20mm autocannon that has an effective range of about 1,500 meters and, depending on ammunition type, is able to penetrate around 20mm RHAe (rolled homogeneous armour equivalency).

In 1978, the technical-military council of Yugoslav People's Army decided that a larger caliber gun would be necessary to counter the increasingly heavy armor of possible enemy armored fighting vehicles and began development of a new turret to house the larger weapon. This requirement led to the development of the Zastava M86 30mm autocannon in 1985 and a new turret called Vidra, which was later designated the M91. In addition to the new gyrostabilized 30mm autocannon, the new turret was equipped with smoke grenade launchers, improved day/night sights, and the ability to fire Malyutka ATGMs. The turret is rotated by servo-hydraulics and the main gun is elevated and depressed using an electric motor.

Incremental improvements were made to the design of the Vidra turret throughout the late 1990s and early 2000s. These improvements would eventually be standardized and incorporated into a thoroughly updated turret and designated M91E. Besides being able to mount the original M86 30mm autocannon, the M91E-I and MM91E-II turrets able to accommodate the dual feed Zastava M89 30mm autocannon.

Development is ongoing on a further modernized turret incorporating more effective ATGM armament. Besides BVP M-80 versions, the Vidra turret is offered for modernization or production with other vehicles such as BTR-50.

== Variants ==
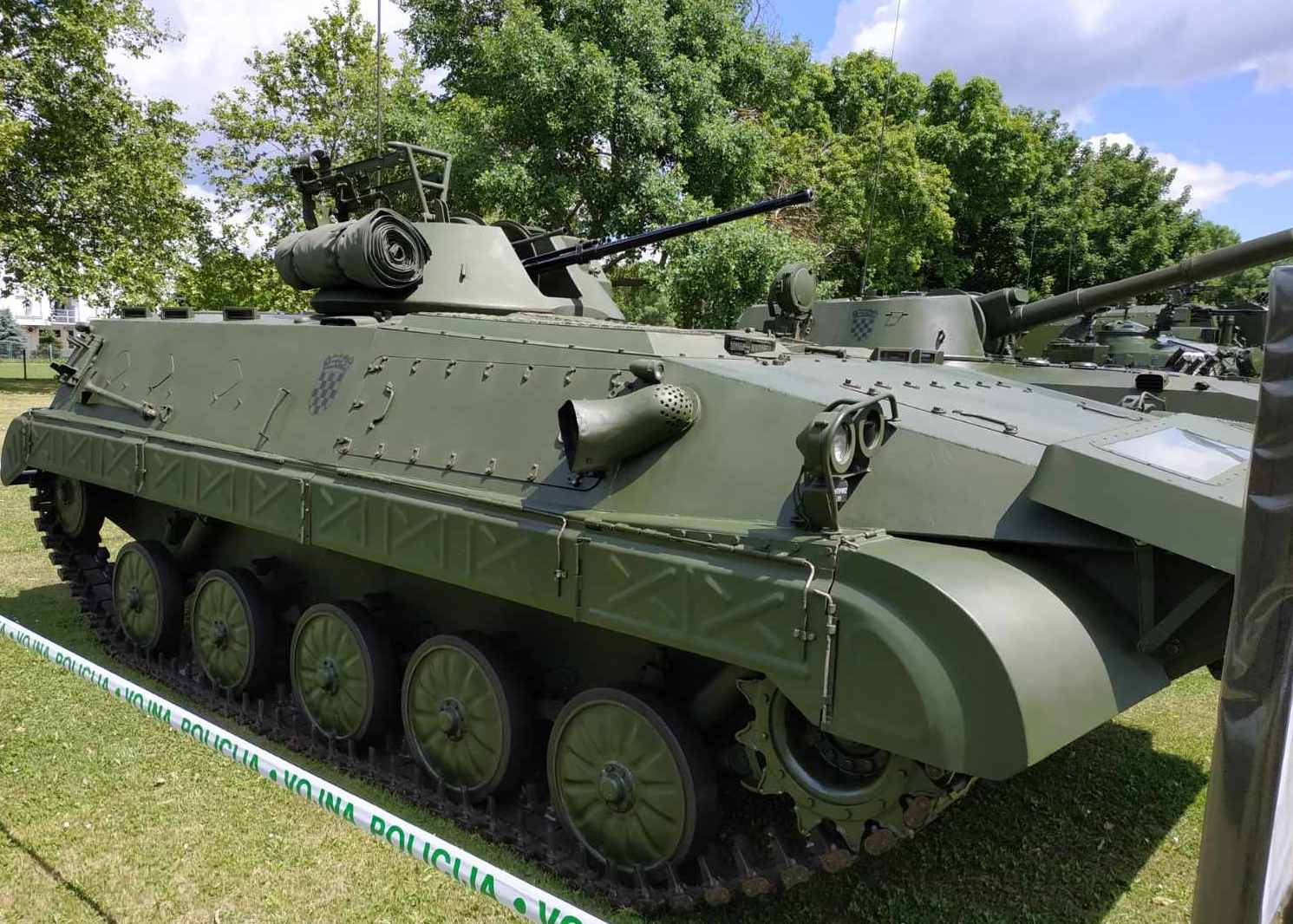
Croatian BVP M-80A

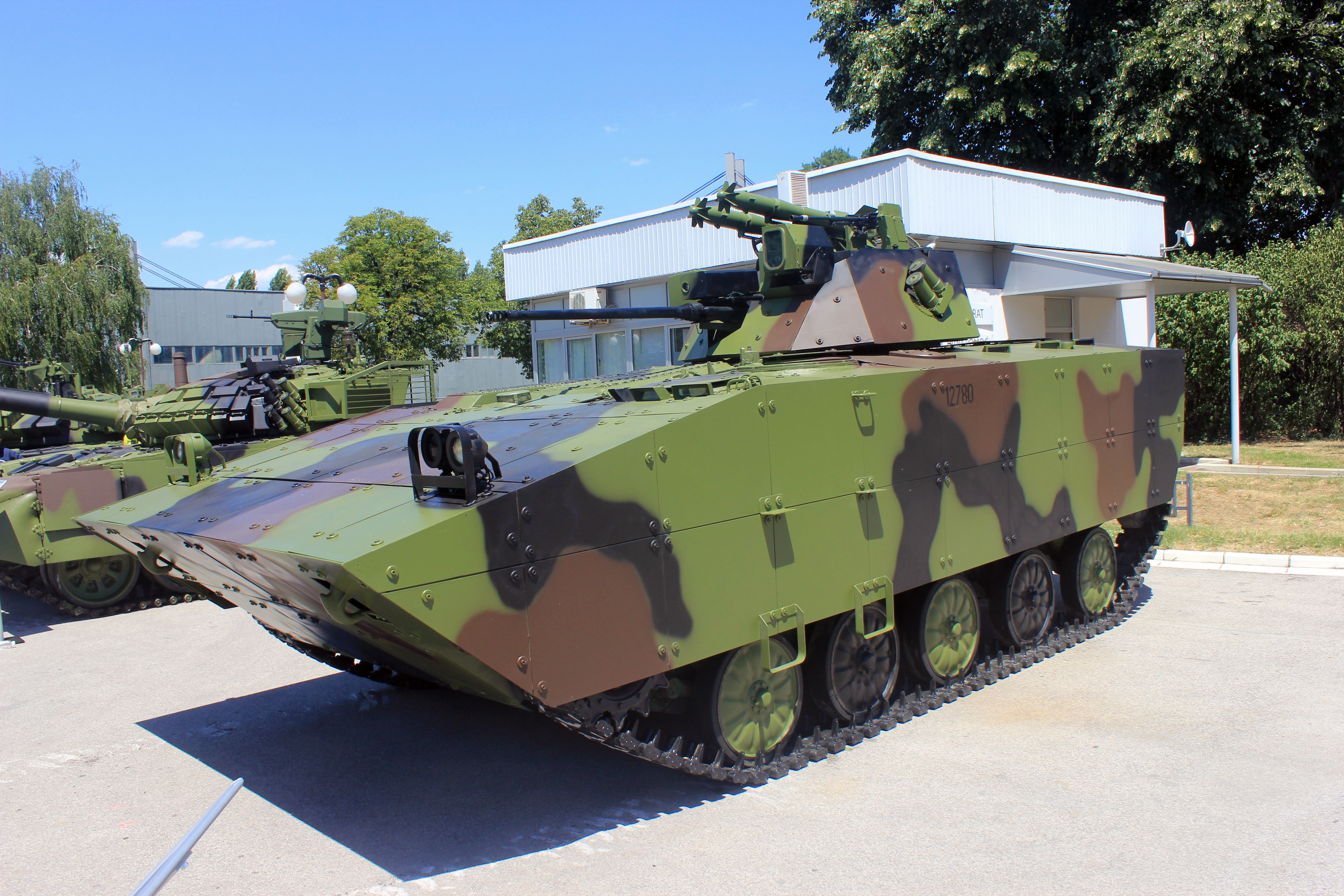
Serbian BVP M-80AB1

- M-80 – first production model with 260 hp engine, replaced after one year.
- M-80A – improved version with 320 hp engine; serial production.
- M-80A/98 – improved version of M-80A1 with new turret "Vidra" first designated as M-96 later changed to M80A/98, officially unveiled in 2004; prototype only.
- M-80A KC – company commander's vehicle.
- M-80A KB – battalion commander's vehicle.
- M-80A VK - commander's vehicle, no turret.
- M-80A Sn – medical vehicle carrying 4 stretcher patients or 8 seated patients; no turret and with single oblong hatch in the roof and single rear door
- M-80A LT – tank destroyer with six AT-3 launchers.
- Sava M-90 – SA-13 (designated Strela-10MJ) surface-to-air-missile launcher, prototype only.
- MOS – self-propelled mine layer.
- M-80AK/M-98A – equipped with turret with 30 mm M86 cannon or 30 mm dual feed M89 cannon.
- SPAT 30/2 – self-propelled anti-aircraft gun. New turret model called "Foka" with two Zastava 30 mm autocannons with elevation from -5 to +85 degrees. The aim-scan gear is J-171 or Motorola 6800. Included receiver of radar data gathered from external observations radar. Three crew members and four soldiers could be transported. Planned as successor of M-53/59 Praga – 4 models produced.
- M-80AB1 – modernized variant with more advanced armour, turret gun control equipment, optronics package, smoke grenade launchers and the ability to mount and launch upgraded 9M14 Malyutka missiles. Entered in service with Serbian Army in 2024.

== Operators ==
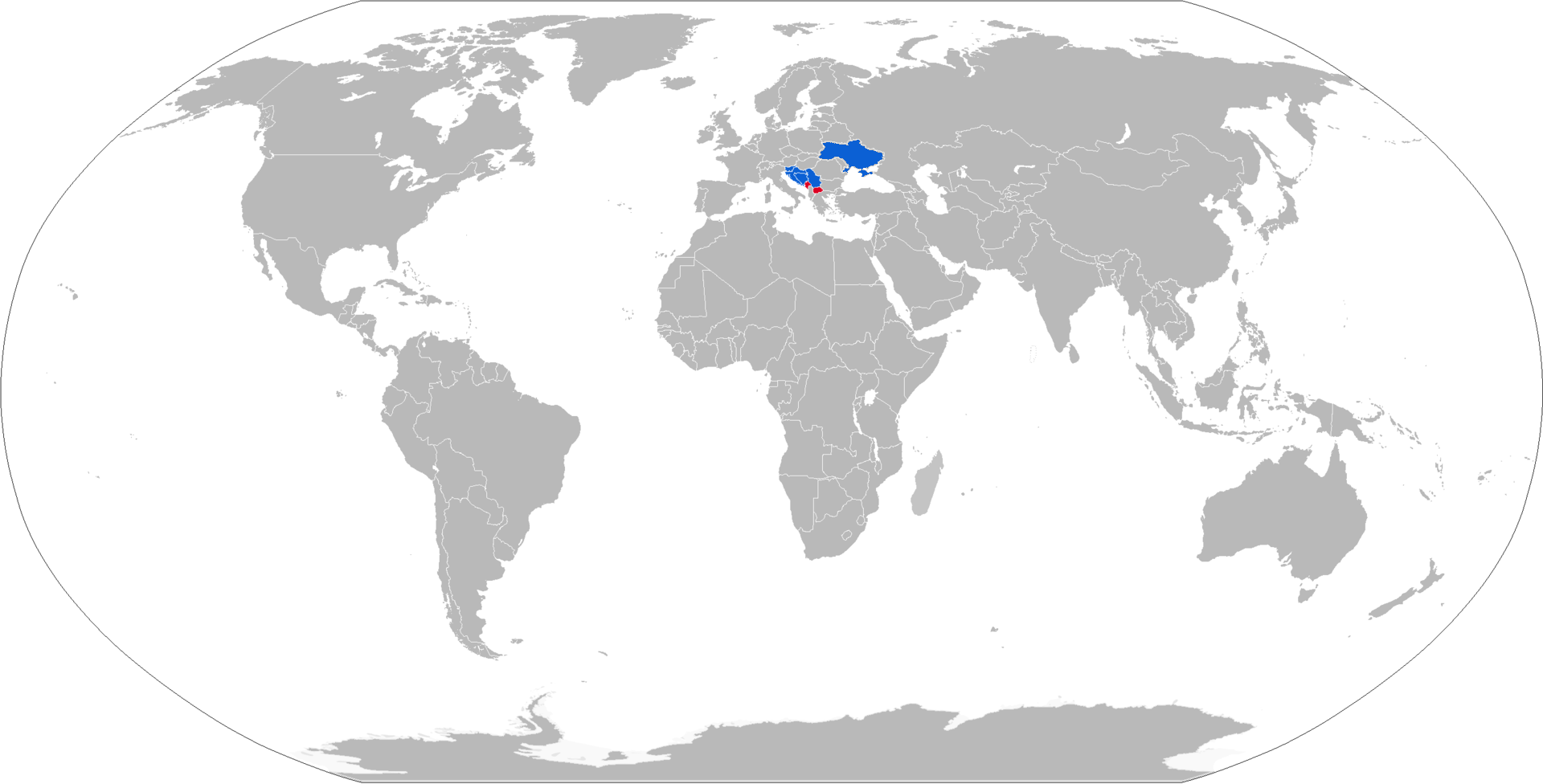
Map of M-80 operators in blue with former operators in red

=== Current operators ===
- Croatia – 70 BVP M80A, to be replaced by M2 Bradley by 2025–2026.
- Serbia – 296 BVP M-80A and 29 BVP М-80АB1; plans to upgrade 220 vehicles to BVP М-80АB1 standard.
- Ukraine – 68 BVP M80A; 38 donated by Slovenia in 2024; 30 donated by Croatia in 2024 in a swap deal with Germany.

=== Former operators ===
- Yugoslavia – Passed on to successor states.

- Bosnia and Herzegovina – 30+ in 1998
- North Macedonia – 2 in 1998
- Slovenia – 62 in 1998, 52 in 2002, 35 vehicles were donated in 2022 and 3 in 2023 as donation to Ukraine.
- Serbia and Montenegro – 568 in 1998.

== Gallery ==
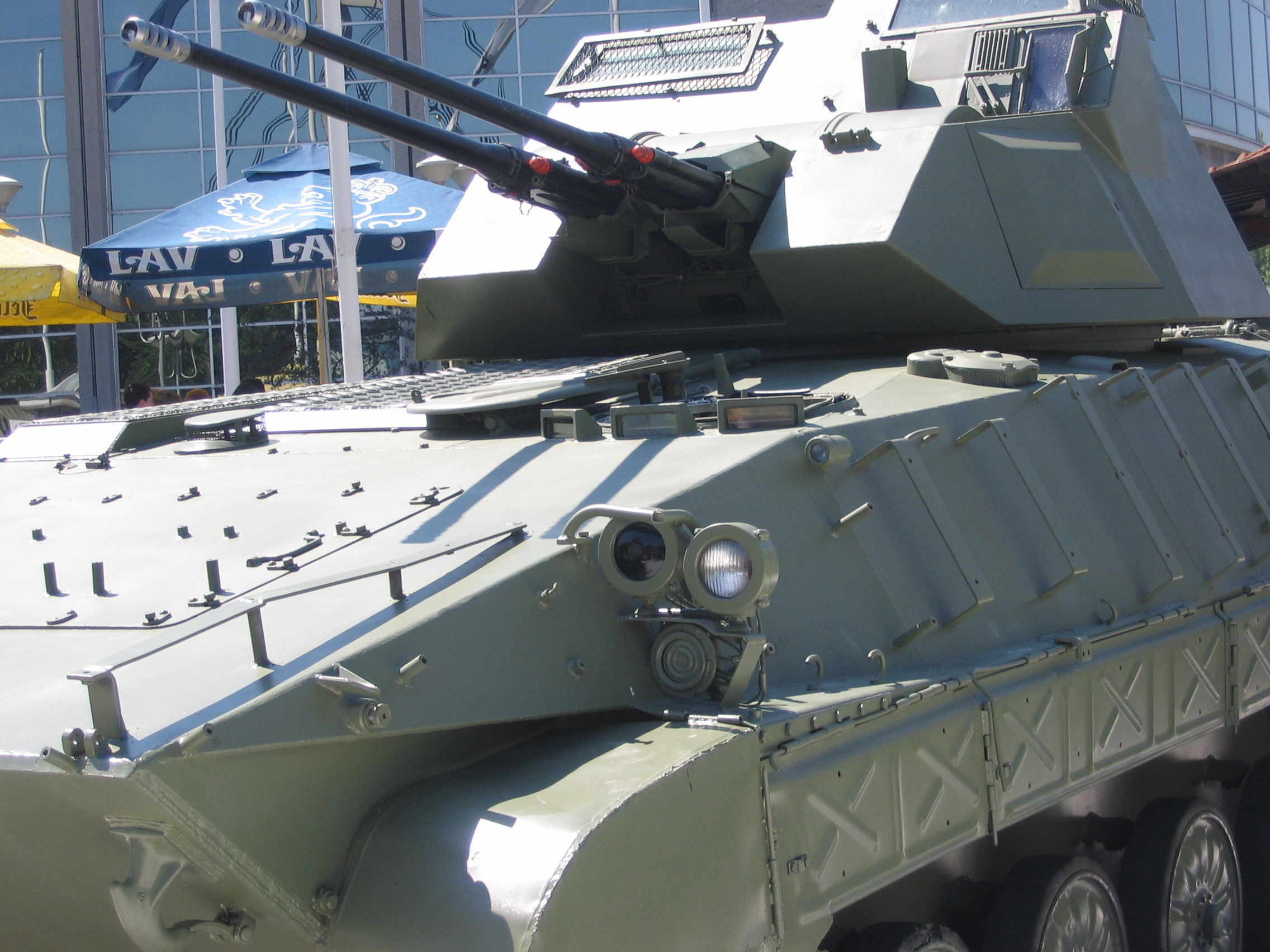
BVP M80 SPAT 30/2 with Foka turret

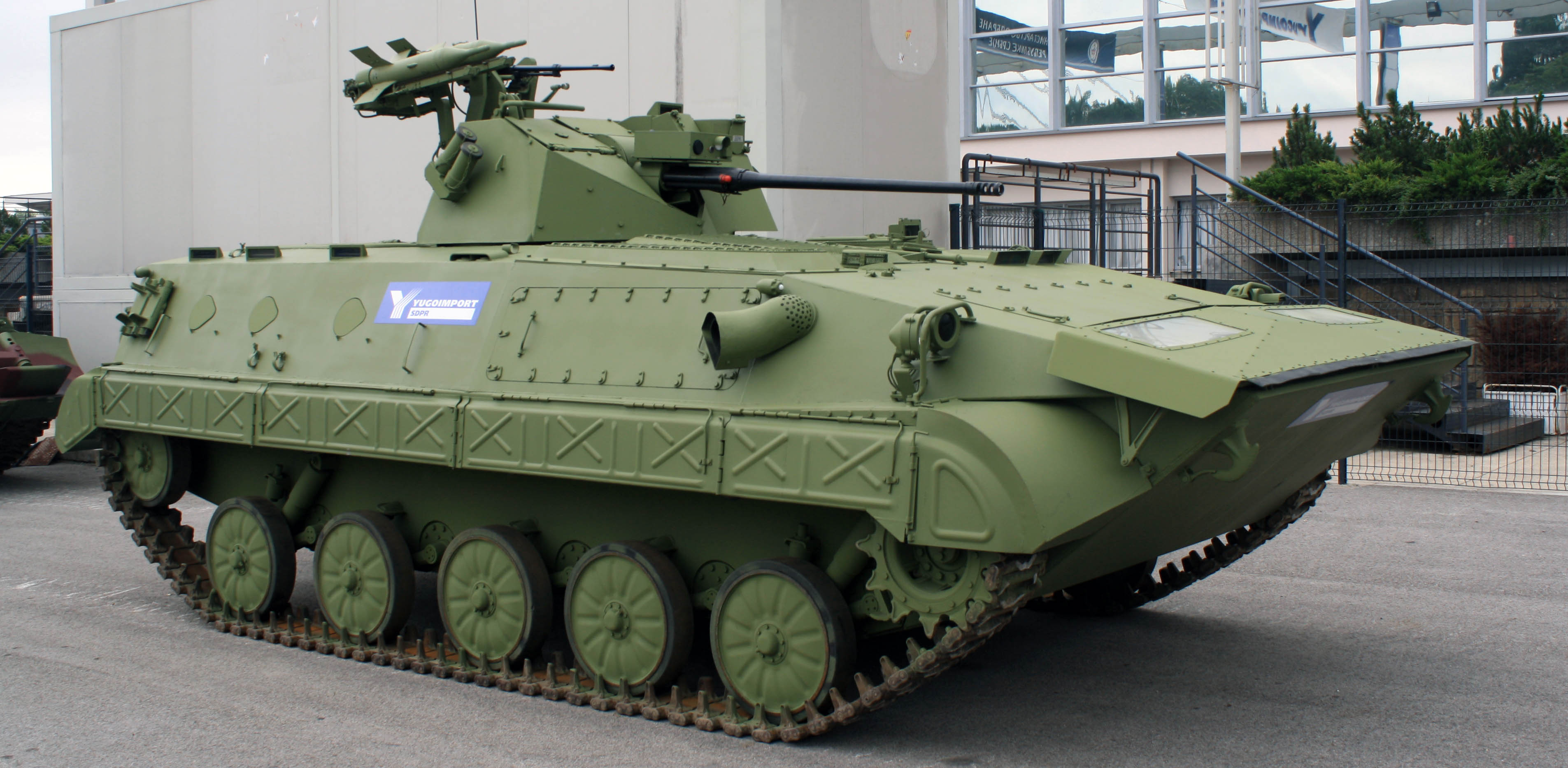
BVP M80A1 with Vidra turret

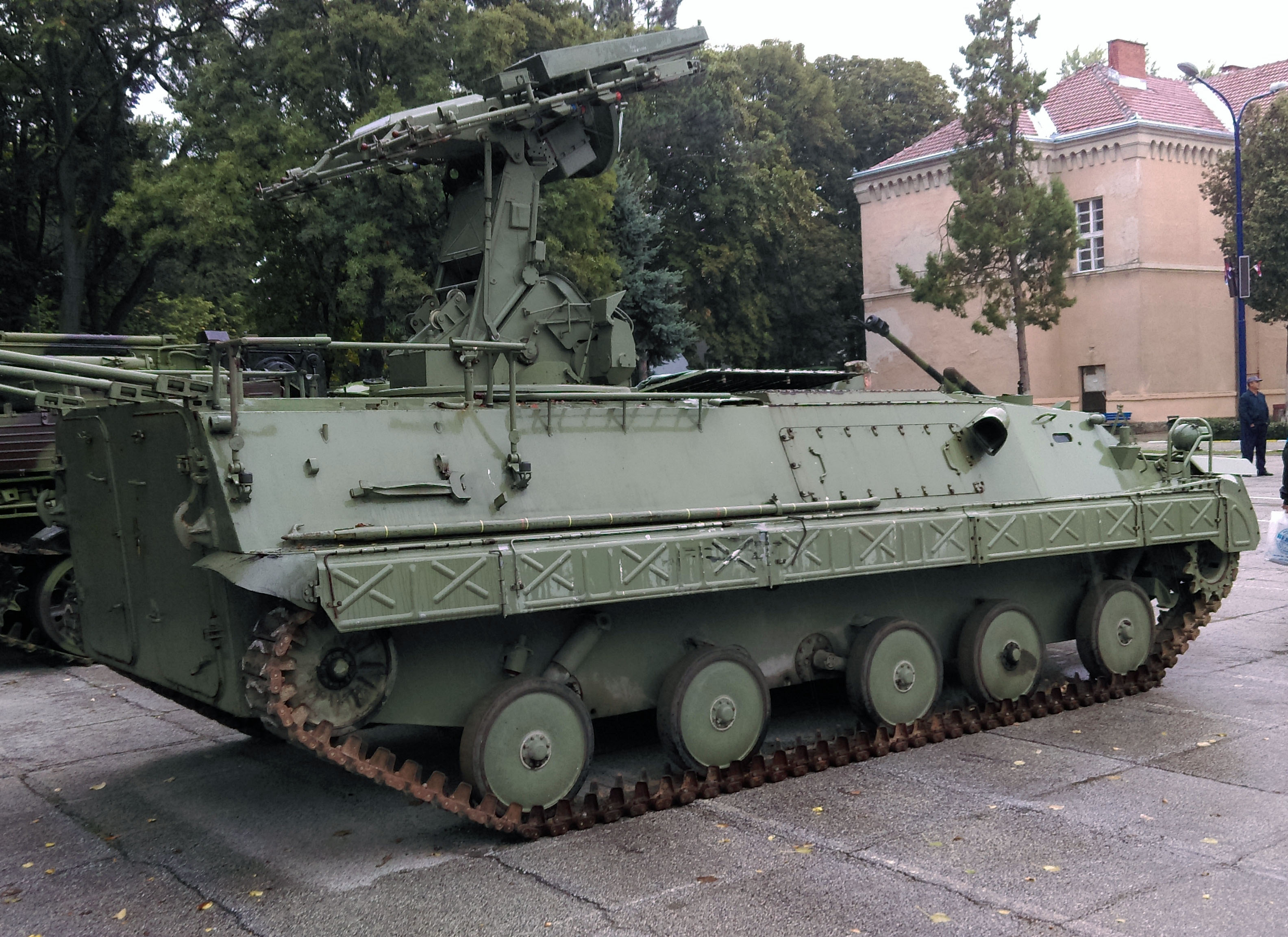
Sava M-90 with Strela 10 launcher

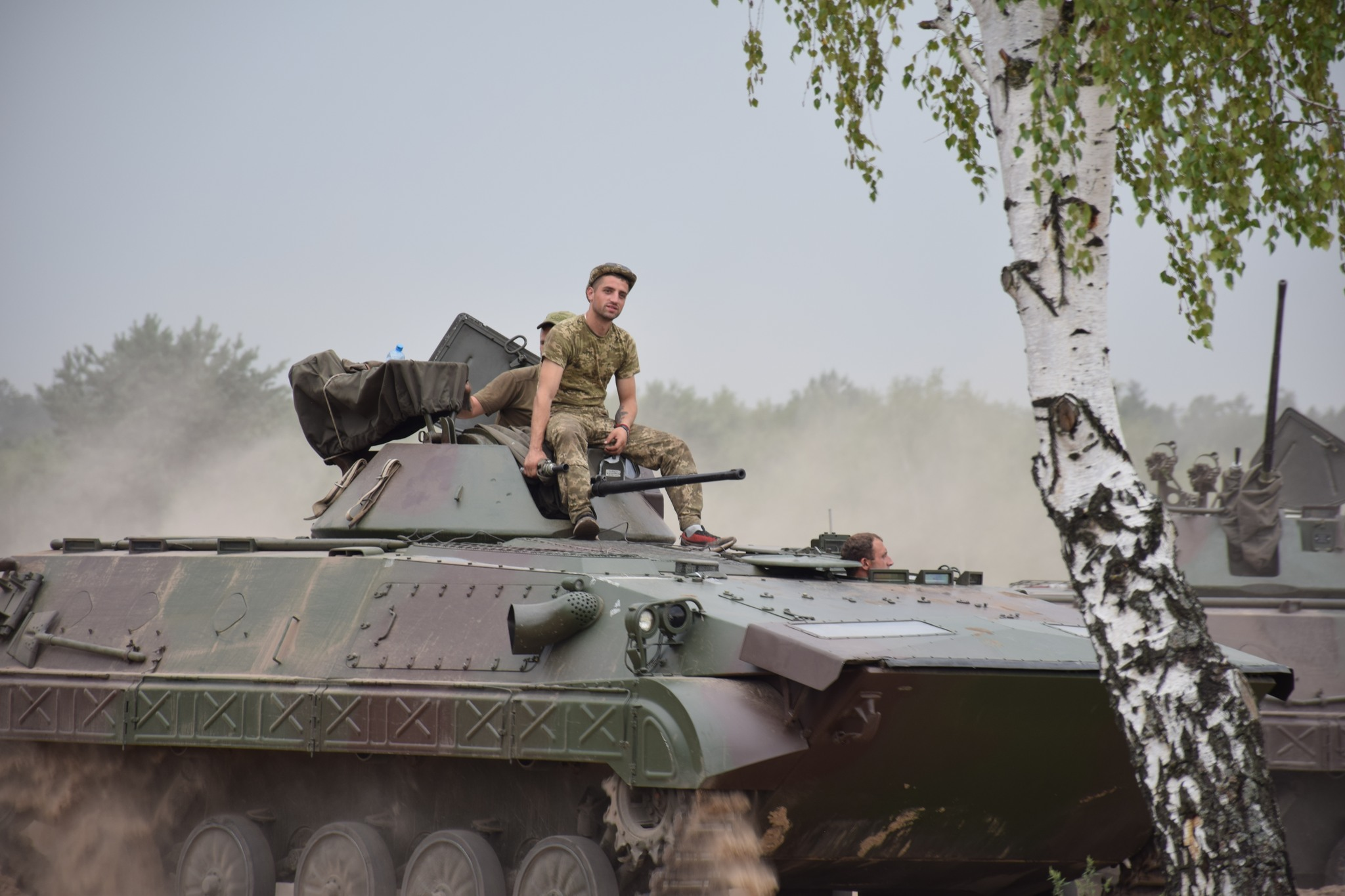
Ukrainian BVP M-80A of the 24th Mechanized Brigade

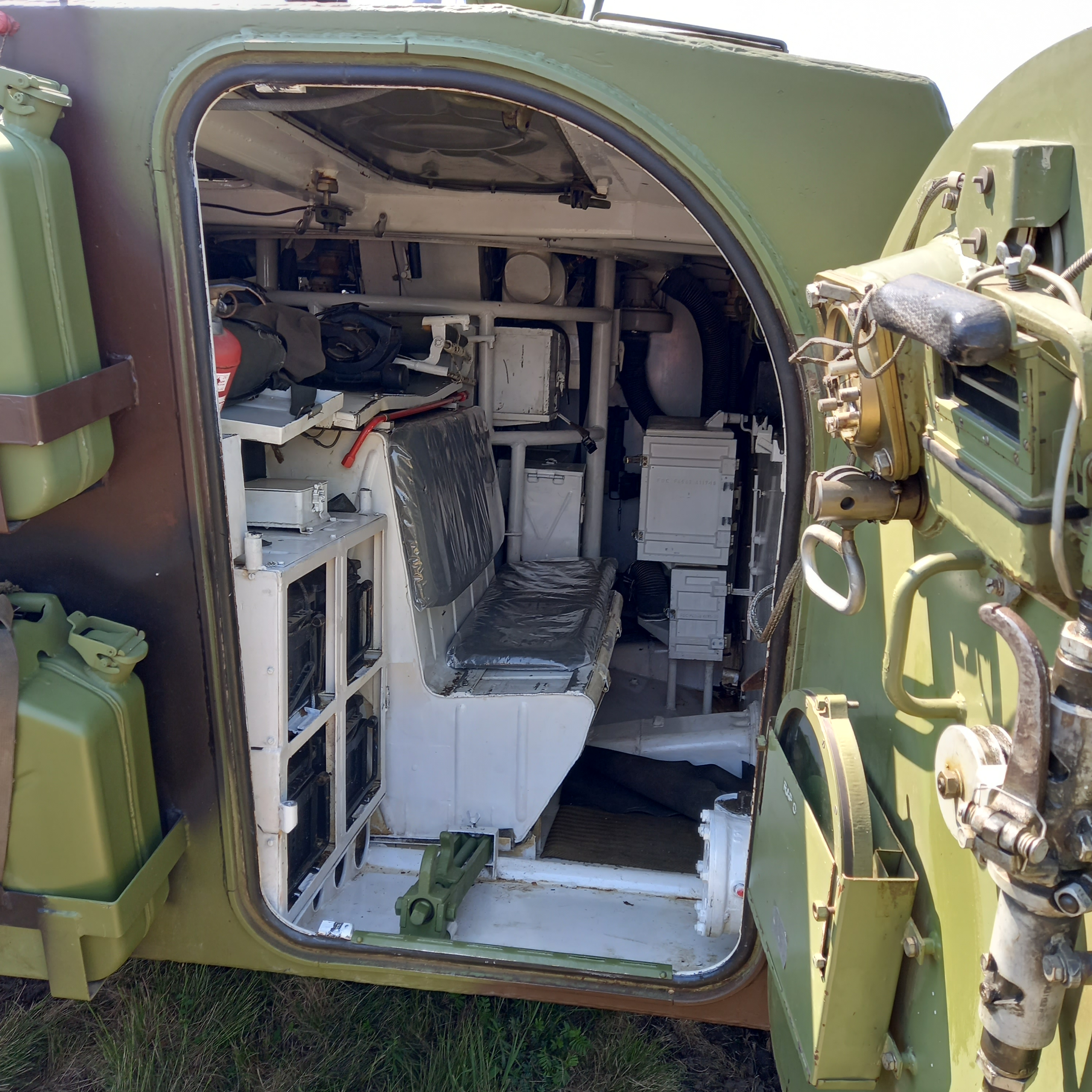
Interior of the BVP M-80A
