= Stevan Mirković =

General Stevan Mirković
- Стеван Мирковић
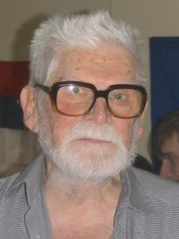
- Mirković in 2013
- Born: 27 October 1927; Valjevo (Oblast of Valjevo), Kingdom of Serbs, Croats and Slovenes (modern Serbia)
- Died: 26 September 2015 (aged 87); Belgrade, Serbia
- Burial place: Belgrade New Cemetery; 44°48′34″N 20°29′14″E
- Military career
- Allegiance: Yugoslavia
- Branch: Yugoslav People's Army: Ground Forces
- Service years: 1944–1989
- Rank: Colonel general
- Commands: Chief of the General Staff of the Yugoslav People's Army (1987–1989)
- Conflicts: World War II

Stevan Mirković (Serbian Cyrillic: Стеван Мирковић; 27 October 1927 – 26 September 2015) was a Serb general of the Yugoslav People's Army (JNA).

== Biography ==
In 1944, during World War II in Yugoslavia, Mirković joined both the Yugoslav Partisans and the League of Communists of Yugoslavia (SKJ). He was wounded on the Syrmian Front and near Brčko. He was promoted to Major General in 1975, Lieutenant General in 1982 and Colonel General in 1987. In the 1980s, he held a number of senior positions in the Yugoslav People's Army (JNA). In 1987–1989, he held the position of the Chief of the General Staff of the JNA. He retired from active military service on 31 December 1989. However, he continued to be a member of the Organization of the League of Communists in the Yugoslav People's Army. He was a fierce critic of Slobodan Milošević, as Milošević's influence in the Socialist Republic of Serbia grew during 1989 and 1990.

== Literature ==
- Ivetić, Velimir (2000). Načelnici generalštaba 1876—2000. Beograd: Novinsko-informativni centar VOJSКA.

Military offices
Preceded by Zorko Čanadi	Chief of the General Staff of the Yugoslav People's Army; 15 September 1987 – 29 September 1989	Succeeded by Blagoje Adžić
