= Yugoslav Ground Forces =

Ground Forces
- Kopnena Vojska; Копнена Војска
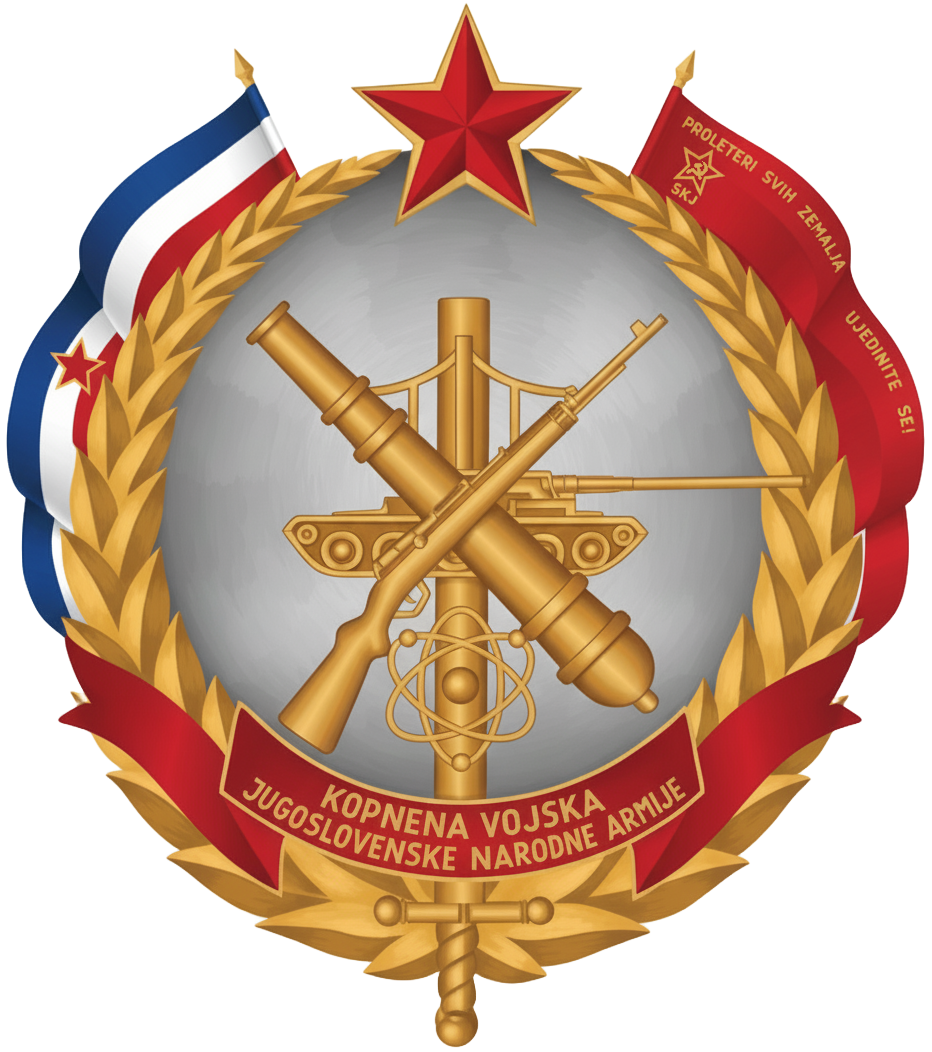
- Emblem of the Yugoslav People's Army Ground Forces
- Founded: 1 March 1945
- Disbanded: 20 May 1992
- Country: Socialist Federal Republic of Yugoslavia
- Size: about 200,000 personnel (c. 2.000.000 reserve)
- Part of: Yugoslav People's Army
- Garrison/HQ: Belgrade, Yugoslavia
- Mottos: Za slobodu i nezavisnost socijalističke otadžbine За слободу и независност социјалистичке отаџбине “For freedom and independence of the socialist fatherland”
- March: Pešadijo, Pešadijo, Pešadijo! (Infantry, Infantry, Infantry!)
- Anniversaries: 22 December
- Engagements: Anti-communist insurgencies in Central and Eastern Europe: Croatian Anti-Communist Resistance in Yugoslavia; Yugoslav Wars: Ten Day War; Croatian War of Independence; Bosnian War

Commanders
- Last commander: Colonel General Života Panić

Insignia
- Infantry flag (obverse and reverse)

The Yugoslav Ground Forces (Serbo-Croatian: Kopnena Vojska – KoV, Serbo-Croatian Cyrillic: Копнена Војска – КоВ) was the ground forces branch of the Yugoslav People's Army (JNA) from 1 March 1945 until 20 May 1992 when the last remaining remnants were merged into the Ground Forces of the new Federal Republic of Yugoslavia, under the threat of sanctions.

== History ==
The origins of the JNA can be found in the Yugoslav Partisan units of World War II. As a part of the Resistance during World War II People's Liberation War of Yugoslavia, the People's Liberation Army of Yugoslavia (NOVJ), a predecessor of JNA, was formed on 22 December 1941 in the town of Rudo in Bosnia and Herzegovina with the establishment of the 1st Proletarian Brigade. After the liberation of the country from the Axis powers occupation, that date was officially celebrated as the Day of the Army in the SFR Yugoslavia.

In March 1945, the NOVJ was renamed the Yugoslav Army (Jugoslovenska Armija). On 31 May 1945, Marshal Tito signed an order on the formation and location of the highest-level commands, four armies, two army areas, and the First Tank Army. However the two army areas, 3rd and 4th, differed little from the more operationally oriented armies, and the distinction between the two types was later lost. The First Army, headquartered in Kragujevac, covered Serbia minus two districts which were covered by the Fifth Army. The Second Army was headquartered in Zagreb and covered the territory of Croatia and part of Bosnia and Herzegovina: the districts of Cazin, Bihaÿ and Livno. The Third Army occupied Vojvodina, excluding Panÿevo, and the Fourth Army occupied Slovenia. The Fifth Army with headquarters in Skopje, covered all of Macedonia, Kosovo and Metohija, as well as the Leskovac and Vranje districts of Serbia. Finally, the Sixth Army covered the territory of Bosnia and Herzegovina, excluding the part under the jurisdiction of the Second Army, and Montenegro. The Belgrade City Command was directly responsible to the Ministry of National Defence. The First Tank Army, supervising two tank divisions (1st and 2nd Tank Divisions were formed in May 1945 ) which had been upgraded from brigades, was formed at the same time, but did not last long.

In June 1948 Yugoslavia's sudden expulsion from the Soviet Cominform (the Informbiro period) forced the Chief of the General Staff, General Koča Popović, to consider the threat of an invasion by the Soviet Union and the Warsaw Pact. From that point defence of the eastern and northeastern borders (Hungary, Romania, Bulgaria) needed to be actively considered. The risk had been appreciated earlier; the General Staff had issued an order on May 14, 1948 to renumber all military units, ranging from entire armies down to independent battalions. The deployment and locations of the army had previously been well known to the Soviets due to the significant presence of Soviet instructors.

In 1948, the territory of the People's Republic of Slovenia was assigned to the Fifth Military District, headquartered in Zagreb, which remained in place—albeit under varying designations—until 1969. The same year the 4th Army—which was present in Slovenia and subordinate to the 5th Military District—was renamed the 10th Army.

In mid-1949, the 4th and 9th Mechanized Corps were formed, absorbed the majority of armoured units. The original plans called for the formation of three corps; however, following the cessation of Soviet deliveries, the 4th Mechanized Corps was established within the Fifth Military District—based on the 1st Tank Division and headquartered in Sisak (though somewhat weaker, consisting of only two tank brigades)—while the 9th Mechanized Corps was formed in the Third Military District (based on the 2nd Tank Division), with its headquarters in Skopje. The planned third corps (or division) was never established; it was intended to cover the region of central Serbia. The two corps were reduced in status to the 20th and 26th Armoured Divisions in mid-1950, as without additional Soviet equipment, the two corps could not be properly filled out. However, 17th Tank Division at Kragujevac was formed in 1950;

In 1950, the 10th Army was reorganized into the 23rd Rifle Corps; for the first time, its commander was of Slovenian nationality. In 1956, the 23rd Rifle Corps was reorganized into the Ljubljana Military District. In 1967, a general of Slovenian ethnicity (Ivan Sekirnik) was once again appointed to head the Ljubljana Military District.

The Army reportedly had eight divisions in the early 1950s. On its 10th anniversary on 22 December 1951, it received the adjective People's (i.e. Narodna).

The 63rd Parachute Brigade was established in 1953, but disbanded in 1959. In 1959 the Ground Forces were reorganised under Plan "Drvar," a Pentomic-type set-up which aimed to be decentralised, and highly flexible, inspired by Yugoslavia’s Second World War experience and modified to survive nuclear warfare conditions. It downsized forces into lighter, more maneuverable formations. It appears that 33 infantry and two armoured divisions were planned or active under "Drvar."

Between 1959 and 1964, almost all JNA divisions—classified as either "Class A" or "Class B"—bore names modeled after Partisan divisions, including a territorial designation (apart from the 1st Proletarian and 14th Divisions). A peacetime division was assigned and inherited the traditions of a specific division that had existed during World War II.

In 1962, Navy Headquarters was reorganized into the 4th Army, including both naval units but also all land forces in the coastal and hinterland areas. This was considered a step forward in the integration of all forces on the Adriatic battlefield.

The five-part 1959 Drvar organisation didn't work particularly well. In 1964 Plan Drvar-2 rolled back the most impractical elements. 26th Armoured Division was disbanded and 20th Armoured Division was redesignated 7th Armoured Division with its headquarters at Sisak. The 2nd and 6th Proletarian Divisions, along with the 4th, 5th, 12th (possibly in the Osijek area), 13th, 15th, 18th, 32nd, and 42nd Infantry Divisions, retained their armored battalions. Other divisions active at this time included the Guards Division in or near Belgrade; the 2nd Infantry Division (Nis)(Type "A"); the 9th at Knin (formerly the 19th); the 14th (Type "A")—headquartered in Postojna within the Ninth Army District; and the 16th, 21st, 23rd, 24th, 25th, and 36th Infantry Divisions. Under the Drvar-2 plan, the 41st Armored Regiment was formed in Prilep in 1964 as part of the 41st Infantry Division (Type "A") (Bitolj). In addition, the 7th Armoured Division was retained within the Fifth Army District. The "Drvar-2" plan stipulated that by 1975 the JNA would possess 2,517 tanks distributed among one armoured division, with three armoured brigades; six independent armored brigades; and total of 20 infantry divisions, made up of eight infantry divisions each with one armored regiment (comprising 3 battalions); two infantry divisions with a two-battalion armoured regiment; and 10 infantry divisions each with one armored battalion. There would also be five infantry brigades each with an armored battalion.

By August 1966 the ground forces had grown to what the ISS estimated as a strength of 220,000, including 13 infantry, 3 armoured, and 6 mountain divisions, and 14 independent brigades, including an airborne and a marine infantry brigade. The 63rd Parachute Brigade, disbanded in 1959, was reformed in 1967 and stationed at Niš.

The Snaga and Snaga-2 plans followed, the first in 1966-68 when an attack only from NATO was envisaged, then a total switch after the Warsaw Pact invasion of Czechoslovakia in 1968, when it became clear that the Soviets could invade. The Armed Forces had to be supplemented by forces for protracted guerrilla warfare. Snaga-2 created the Territorial Defense (TO) was formed to support the JNA in September 1968.

While parts of the structure changed from 1969 to 1988, the main outlines stayed the same:

- First Army (Belgrade) – northern part of Central Serbia and Northern Serbia (Vojvodina)
- Second Army (Niš) – southern part of Central Serbia and Southern Serbia (Kosovo and Metohia)
- Third Army (Skopje) – Macedonia
- Military-Naval District (Split, Croatia) – formerly Fourth Army
- Fifth Army (Zagreb) – Croatia Among commanders of the Fifth Army / Military District were Colonel Generals Ivan Rukavina (1950s-1960s); Đoko Jovanić (early 1970s); Zorko Čanadi; and Konrad Kolšek (commanding the reorganised Fifth Military District after 1989)
- Seventh Army (Sarajevo) – Bosnia and Herzegovina
- Ninth Army (Ljubljana, Slovenia).

In July 1970, the International Institute for Strategic Studies estimated the Ground Forces to include 200,000 personnel, nine infantry divisions with some T-34 tanks; one armoured division with M47 Patton, T-54, and T-55 tanks; 33 independent infantry brigades, 12 independent tank brigades, one marine infantry brigade, one airborne brigade, 650 M4 Sherman tanks, PT-76 and about 35 AMX-13 tanks, M-3, BTR-50, and BTR-60P armoured personnel carriers, SU-100 self propelled guns, and 105mm and 155 howitzers, SA-2 "Guideline" surface to air missiles, and SU-57P self propelled anti aircraft guns.

In accordance with the 1974 Yugoslav Constitution the Land Forces were divided into six armies allocated to the five republics. On 21 February 1974 TO units were subordinated to their provinces or republics. Thus the JNA and TO became equal parts of the Yugoslav Armed Forces (Oružane Snage SFRJ).

As of July 1979 the International Institute for Strategic Studies estimated the Yugoslav ground forces to include 190,000 personnel (including 130,000 conscripts), eight infantry divisions, seven independent tank brigades, 12 independent infantry brigades, two mountain infantry brigades, one airborne battalion, 12 artillery regiments, six anti-tank artillery regiments, and 12 anti-aircraft artillery regiments.

Tensions between the JNA and the TO became evident at the political situation in Yugoslavia deteriorated in the 1980s. The Federal government became concerned that Yugoslavia's constituent republics would use the TO to facilitate their secession from Yugoslavia and therefore disarmed the Kosovo TO of 130,000 members. S-81 or Plan "Podujevo" was formulated following the death of Tito in 1980 and the massive civil unrest/nationalist riots in Kosovo in the spring of 1981; the JNA found itself facing internal security threats.

2nd Corps (sh:2. korpus JNA - Titograd), with its headquarters in Titograd, was established in 1981. Until December 1988, it was directly responsible to the Federal Secretariat for National Defence (SSNO). From December 1988 to January 1992, it was part of the 3rd Military District (3. VO). The 2nd Corps' zone of responsibility encompassed the Socialist Republic of Montenegro. The 2nd Corps was under the command of the 3rd Military District (until September 1991), the 2nd Operational Group (2. OG) (from September to December 1991), and the 4th Military District (from January to May 1992). Manoeuvre divisions in 1987 included:

- Twelve infantry divisions: 5th Infantry Division (5. pešadijska divizija, 5. pd) at Banja Luka (formed c1984 from 5th ID Devt Comd?); 6th Proletarian Infantry Division at Karlovac (active as early as 1956(?)); 7th Infantry Division at Sisak (in 1969 the 32nd Regiment at Sisak was reorganised as the 32nd Infantry Division (Category "B") from 1970 becoming the 7th Infantry Division (Cat "B"); 21st Infantry Division at Leskovac; 22. pd - Belgrade, 23rd Infantry Division at Zajecar;, 24th Infantry Division at Smederevo; 25th Infantry Division at Šabac, 26th pd at Stip, 31st pešadijska divizija (31. pd) at Maribor, 41st pd at Bitola (active by 1964 when an armoured regiment was being added); 42nd pd at Kumanovo.
- Six motorised divisions: 2nd Proletarian Motorised Division - Nis (reformed 1968-69), 4th Motorised Division - Sarajevo (formed after 1968 Czech crisis); 9th Motorised Division - Knin (which seemingly dates as the 9th Inf Div to Drvar-2 in 1964 after redesignation from 19th Inf Div, 12th mtd - Osijek (formed after 1980); 14th Proletarian Motorised Division ""Boris Kidrič" at Postojna (9th Army Area); 37th Motorised Division at Raska.
- Two mechanized divisions: the 1st Proletarian Guards Mechanised Division in Belgrade and the 32nd Mechanised Division at Varaždin. The 32nd Mechanised Division had been converted from the previous 32nd Infantry Division at Varaždin in 1985.

In 1988 the JNA absorbed the entire Territorial Defence with the Bosnian Serb General Blagoje Adžić becoming the JNA Chief of the Armed Forces General Staff.

In 1988 the armies were reorganized into Military Districts or Regions which no longer corresponded to internal borders thereby making it harder for the republics to control their own forces. In 1990 the army had nearly completed a major overhaul of its basic force structure. It eliminated its old infantry divisions and established the brigade as the largest operational unit. Seventeen corps were created, each consisting of four to eight brigades. The army converted ten of twelve infantry divisions into twenty-nine tank, mechanized, and mountain infantry brigades with integral artillery, air defence, and anti-tank regiments. The 63rd Airborne Brigade was part of the Air Force. The shift to brigade-level organization provided greater operational flexibility, maneuverability, and tactical initiative, and it reduced the possibility that large army units would be destroyed in set-piece engagements with an enemy. The change created many senior field command positions that would develop relatively young and talented officers. The brigade structure also was more appropriate at a time of declining manpower.

Each Corps contained the following:

- Corps Headquarters Troops,
- Corps combat Support – three artillery regiments (one mixed artillery, one mixed anti-tank, one light anti-aircraft), and six battalions (engineers, signals, military police, NBC (Nuclear Biological Chemical), medical, and replacement).
- Corps combat forces consisted of four armoured/mechanized/motorized brigades, plus infantry, light infantry, and mountain brigades.

Apart from second-line Partisan divisions, the only division remaining in the army after the 1988 Unity reorganisation was the 1st Guards Proletarian Mechanised Division, and even this was made up of mechanised brigades rather than regiments.

Once considered the fourth strongest army in Europe with 200,000 active troops and two million reserve personnel.

== Structure in 1991 ==
In 1991, at the outbreak of the Yugoslav Wars the Ground Forces were organized in four military regions. The First, Third and Fifth corresponded to the three field armies of the ground forces. The Air Force and Air Defence followed this pattern with the First, Third and Fifth Air Corps. Small number of units of the ground and air forces were outside of the military regions directly under General Staff command and control. The fourth region was the Military-Naval Region, a joint Navy / Ground Forces formation, which was in general commanded by the chief of the Navy, with ground forces units for coastal defence in the rear of the naval artillery. The Military-Naval Region did not have tactical aviation units assigned and air support was provided by the three air corps.

In March 1991 the Ground Forces consisted of 17 corps subordinated to four regional headquarters controlling 43 tank, mechanized infantry, and infantry brigades; two mountain brigades; and independent infantry, artillery, and antitank-regiments. The corps were static area defence commands which were assigned manoeuvre brigades, according to their mission, only after mobilization.

- General Staff of the Yugoslav People's Army (Belgrade-Kneževac)
  - units and formations directly under the General Staff
    - Special Forces Group of the General Staff (Pančevo)
    - 1st Guards Mechanized Division ((Belgrade-Banjica)
      - 1st Guards Mechanized Brigade (Belgrade)
      - 2nd Guards Mechanized Brigade (Valjevo)
      - 3rd Guards Mechanized Brigade (Požarevac)
    - 1st Guards Motorized Brigade (Belgrade)
    - 1st Guards Mixed Artillery Regiment (Kragujevac)
    - 1st Guards Light Air Defence Artillery Regiment (Belgrade)
    - 1st Guards Military Police Battalion (Belgrade)
    - 63rd Airborne Brigade (Niš) (formally part of the Air Force)
    - 95th Protection Motorized Regiment (Belgrade)
    - additional units and formations
- First Military Region (Belgrade-Topčider), Northern Theatre (responsible for eastern Croatia (Slavonia), northern part of Central Serbia, Northern Serbia (Vojvodina) and Bosnia and Herzegovina).
  - units and formations directly under the First MR
    - 4th Motorized Division (reduced strength in peacetime) (disbanded in 1990)
    - 22nd Infantry Division (reduced strength in peacetime) (disbanded in 1990)
    - River Flotilla (Novi Sad)
    - Belgrade City Defence Command (Belgrade)
    - other units and formations
  - 4th Corps (Sarajevo)
  - 5th Corps (Banja Luka)
  - 12th Corps (Novi Sad)
  - 17th Corps (Tuzla)
  - 24th Corps (Kragujevac)
  - 37th Corps (Titovo Užice)
- Third Military Region (Yugoslavia) (Skopje), South-Eastern Theatre (southern part of Central Serbia, Southern Serbia (Kosovo and Metohia), inland Montenegro) and Republic of Macedonia
  - units and formations directly under the Third MR
    - 37th Motorized Division (Raška) (reduced strength in peacetime) (disbanded in 1990)
    - other units and formations
  - 2nd Corps (Titograd)
  - 21st Corps (Niš)
  - 41st Corps (Bitola)
  - 42nd Corps (Kumanovo)
  - 52nd Corps (Pristina), probably included the 125th Motorised Brigade (sr:125. моторизована бригада), formed 1981 in Mitrovica
- Fifth Military Region (Zagreb), North-Western Theatre (Slovenia and northern Croatia) General Martin Špegelj, a Croat, left command in 1989 (Davor 2008).
  - units and formations directly under the Fifth MR
    - 6th Proletarian Infantry Division (Karlovac) (reduced strength in peacetime, disbanded in late June 1990)
    - Zagreb City Defence Command (Zagreb) (disbanded in late June 1990)
    - other units and formations
  - 10th Corps (Zagreb) (established in May-June 1990 by combining 6th Proletarian Infantry Division and the Zagreb CDC. Retreated to Bihac when Serb personnel were concentrated in Serb areas. In May 1992 it helped form the basis of the 2nd Krajina Corps of the Army of the Republika Srpska (ARS).)
  - 13th Corps (Rijeka) Became the Herzegovina Corps of the ARS.
  - 14th Corps (Ljubljana)
  - 31st Corps (Maribor)
  - 32nd Corps (Varaždin) (from previous 32nd Mechanised Division)
- Military-Naval Region (Split-Žrnovnica) (Southeast Croatia (Dalmatia) and the Croatian and Montenegrin coastline)
  - Yugoslav Navy Fleet
  - other naval units and formations
  - Naval Bastions (fortifications on the Dalmatian islands)
  - Coastal Artillery
  - 5th Military Sea Sector (Pula) (formed around the 139. Naval Infantry Brigade in Pula (reorganized as 139th Motorized Brigade around 1990) and additional units)
  - 8th Military Sea Sector (Šibenik) (formed around the 11th (Proletarian) Naval Infantry Brigade in Šibenik (reorganized as 12th Amphibious Brigade around 1990) and additional units)
  - 9th Military Sea Sector (Kumbor) (formed around the 472nd Naval Infantry Brigade in Trebinje) (reorganized as 472nd Motorized Brigade around 1990) and additional units)
- 9th Corps (Knin)

== Corps ==
- Serbian (x 5) – 12th, 21st, 24th, 37th, and 52nd
- Croatian (x 4) – 9th, 10th, 13th, and 32nd
- Bosnia-Herzegovinian (x 3) – 4th, 5th, and 17th
- Macedonian (x 2) – 41st and 42nd
- Slovene (x 2) – 14th and 31st
- Montenegrin (x 1) – 2nd

During the course of the ten-year-long Yugoslav wars, corps were modified by being reinforced with extra units from out of theatre; battalions then became regiments and regiments became brigades. However many units were also disbanded when their non-Serbian/Montenegrin personnel deserted.

== Personnel ==
In the 1980s the ground forces had about 200,000 active-duty soldiers (including 90,000 conscripts) and could mobilize over a million trained reservists in wartime. Most soldiers were of Serbian, Albanian, Croatian, Bosnian, Macedonian or Montenegrin origin. Reserve forces were organized along republican lines into Partisan Forces and Territorial Defence Forces and in wartime they were to be subordinate to JNA Supreme Command as an integral part of the defence system. The Territorial Defence Forces (reserve force) was made up of former conscripts and they were occasionally called up for war exercises.

The ground forces were subdivided into infantry, armour, field artillery, and air defence artillery, as well as signal, engineering and chemical defence corps.

== Operations ==
=== The Ten-Day War ===
During the Ten Day War the JNA performed abysmally as many of the Yugoslav soldiers did not realise they were taking part in a real military operation, rather an exercise, until they came under attack. The officer corps was dominated by Serbs and Montenegrins and in many cases ideologically committed to Yugoslav unity. The rank and file troops however were conscripts, many who had no strong motivation in fighting against the Slovenes. Of the soldiers of the 5th Military District, which was in action in Slovenia, in 1990 30% were Albanians, 20% Croats, 15 to 20% Serbs and Montenegrins, 10% Bosniaks, and 8% Slovenes. The JNA eventually lost nearly all of its Slovenian and Croat personnel, becoming an almost entirely Serbian and Montenegrin force. Its poor performance in Slovenia and later in Croatia discredited its leadership – Kadijević resigned as defence minister in January 1992, and Adžić was forced into medical retirement shortly afterwards. Due to the short duration (10 Days) and relatively low intensity of the war, casualties were low. According to Slovenian estimates, the JNA suffered 44 fatalities and 146 wounded, while 4,692 JNA soldiers and 252 federal police officers were captured by the Slovenian side. According to post-war assessments made by the JNA, its material losses amounted to 31 tanks, 22 armoured personnel carriers, 6 helicopters, 6,787 infantry weapons, 87 artillery pieces and 124 air defence weapons damaged, destroyed or confiscated. Property damage was fairly light, due to the scattered and short-term nature of the fighting.

== Infantry ==
The ground forces led in personnel. It had about 540,000 active-duty soldiers (including 120,000 conscripts) and could mobilize over a million trained reservists in wartime. Reserve forces were organized along republics' lines into Territorial Defence and in wartime they were to be subordinate to JNA Supreme Command as an integral part of defence system. Territorial Defence (reserve force) was made up of former conscripts and they were occasionally called up for war exercises.

The ground forces were infantry, armour, artillery, and air defence, as well as signal, engineering and chemical defence corps.

=== Equipment ===
- Assault Rifles
  - Zastava M70
- Bolt-action Rifle
  - Zastava M48
  - Zastava M 98/48
- Semi-automatic rifle
  - Zastava M59/66
- Machine guns
  - Zastava M53
  - Zastava M87
  - Zastava M84
  - Zastava M72
  - Zastava M77
- Submachine guns
  - Skorpion vz. 61
  - M56 submachine gun
  - M49 submachine gun
- Battle Rifle
  - Zastava M77 B1
- Sniper Rifles
  - Zastava M76
- Pistols
  - CZ-99
  - Zastava M57
  - Zastava M70 (pistol)
  - Zastava M88
- Hand grenade
  - M75 hand grenade
- Launchers
  - M80 Zolja
  - M79 Osa

== Tank and armoured brigades ==
Yugoslav tank brigades comprised two or three battalions each with 31 tanks in three ten tank companies. They operated 1114 Soviet T-54s and T-55s, 73 Soviet T-72s, 443 Yugoslav M-84s, and some United States-made M-47 tanks. The army's tanks were in many respects its most obsolete forces. The T-54/-55 was a frontline model during the 1960s. Domestic production of the M-84 (an improved version of the Soviet T-72 built under license in Yugoslavia) was providing the army with a late 1970s and 1980s model. The army also had a reserve of old T-34/85 and Sherman tanks from World War II.

The Yugoslav army had 995 M-80A IFVs and 551 M-60P armored personnel carriers produced domestically. The infantry also operated more than 200 Soviet-made BTR-152, BTR-40, and BTR-50 armored personnel carriers (APCs), which had been purchased in the 1960s and 1970s. It had 100 M-3A1 half-tracked personnel carriers produced by the United States and a small number of new Romanian TAB-72 (a variant of the BTR-60) armored personnel carriers. Armored reconnaissance vehicles included a few older Soviet BTR-40s, newer BRDM-2 and BTR-60 models, and domestic BOV and M-8 vehicles.

=== Equipment ===
- Light Tanks
  - PT-76 – 63
- Medium Tanks
  - M-4 Sherman – 630 (including M-32, M32B1 and M-74 tank recovery vehicles, stored in reserve)
  - T-34/85 – 889
  - M-47 Patton – 319
  - T-55 – 1614

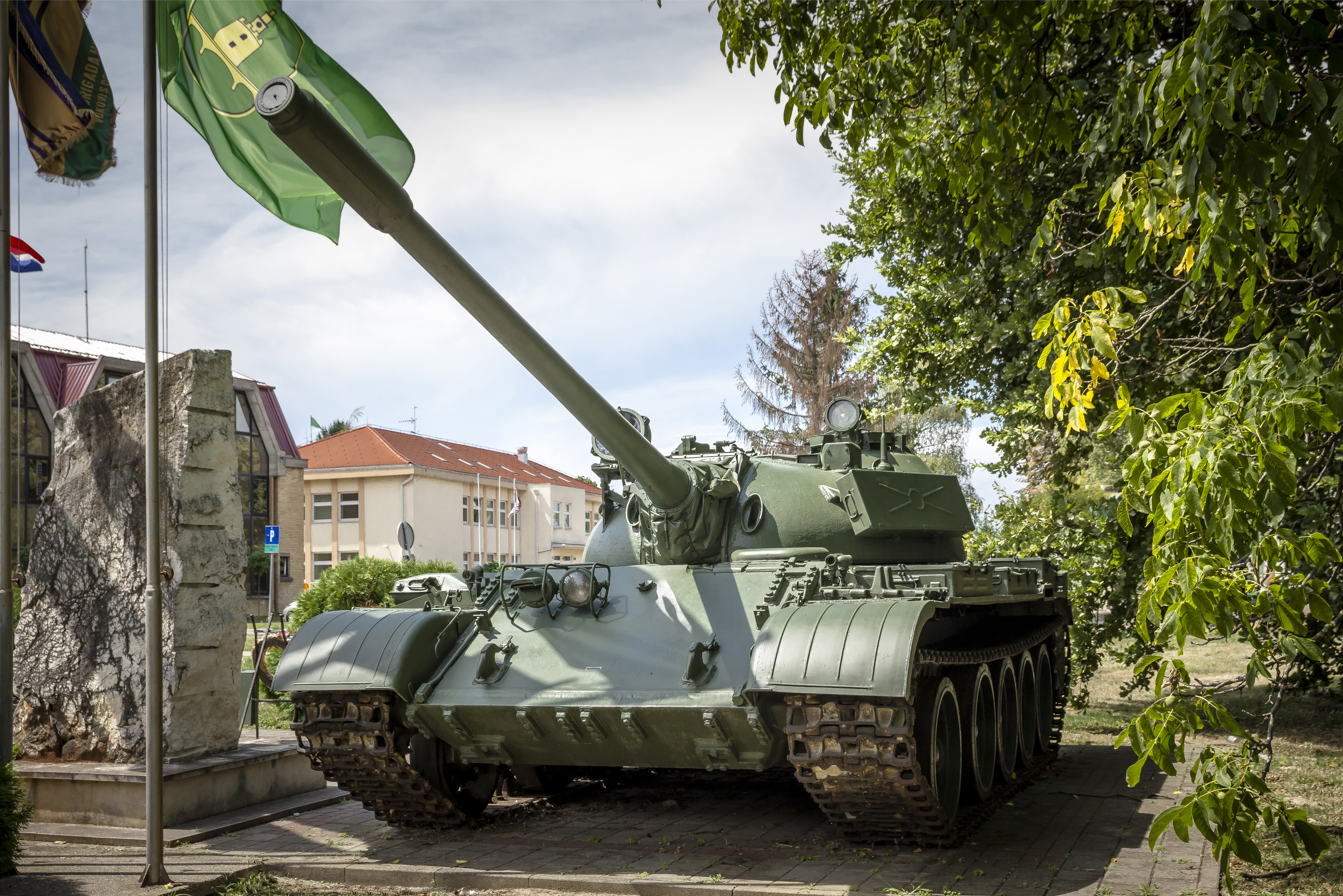
T-55 tank displayed in Valpovo, Croatia

- Main Battle Tanks
  - T-72 – 73
  - M-84 – 443
- Tank Destroyers
  - SU-100 – 40
  - M18 Hellcat – ~260
  - M36 Jackson – ~300
- APC's
  - MT-LB – 40
  - OT M-60 – 551
  - BTR-50 – ~200
  - BTR-60 – 80
  - TAB-72 – 40
- IFV's
  - BVP M-80 – 995
- Armored Reconnaissance Vehicles
  - BRDM-2 – 80
  - BOV APC – 317 (successor state)

== Artillery ==
Yugoslav artillery regiments were well equipped with Soviet, U.S. and domestic systems. Soviet artillery in these units consisted of approximately 1,000 towed 122 mm howitzers, 130 mm guns, 152 mm gun/howitzers, and 155 mm howitzers. There were about 700 older United States 105 mm and 155 mm towed guns and domestically produced models such as the M-65 in the artillery regiments. Towed pieces were very important for operations in the country's mountainous terrain.

Artillery units operated Soviet 100 mm and 122 mm and Yugoslav-produced 105 mm M-7 self-propelled guns. Those units had over 8,000 82 mm and 120 mm mortars, including a self-propelled 82 mm mortar mounted on an M-60PB variant of the standard armored personnel carrier.

Yugoslav artillery units operated several battlefield missile systems including 160 128 mm YMRL-32 and M-63 multiple-rocket launchers. The arsenal included four launchers for Soviet FROG-7 surface-to-surface missiles. First fielded in 1967, the unguided FROG-7 had a range of 100 kilometers.

=== Equipment ===
- Mountain artillery
  - M48 (a.k.a. the Tito Gun)
- Towed Artillery
  - M56 Howitzer – ?

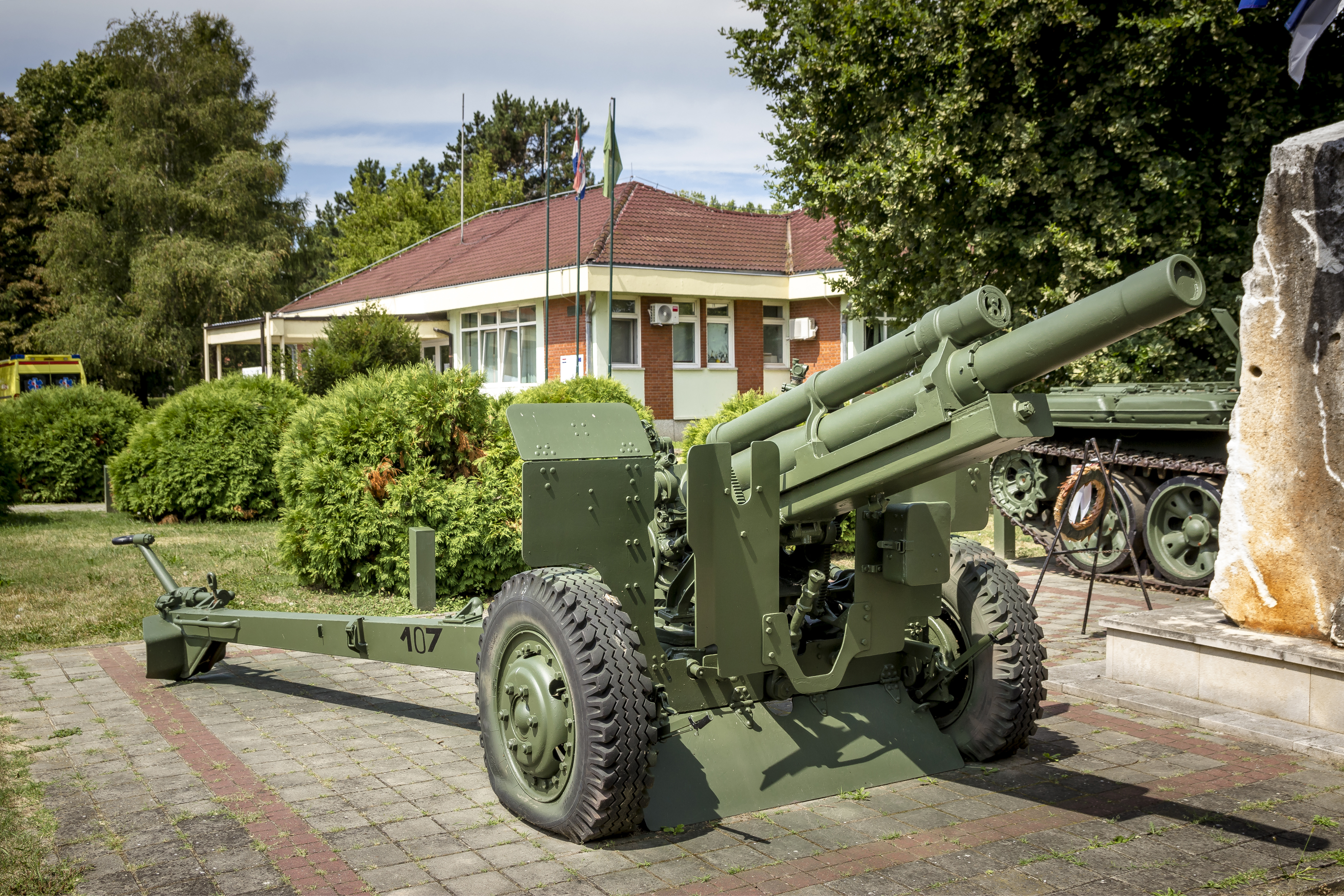
M101 howitzer displayed in Valpovo, Croatia

  - D-30 (D-30J, D-30JA1) – 120
  - D-74 – ?
  - M-46 – 250–300
  - D-20 – 20
  - M84 "NORA A" – 84
- Self-propelled Howitzer
  - 2S1 Gvozdika – 100
- Rocket Artillery
  - M-63 Plamen – ~800
  - M-77 Oganj – ~120
  - M-87 Orkan – ~10
  - FROG-7 – 10

== Anti-tank regiments ==
Yugoslav anti-tank regiments had towed anti-tank guns, recoilless rifles, and Soviet anti-tank guided missiles. Antitank guns included 75 mm, 90 mm, and 100 mm models. They were Soviet produced with the exception of the 90 mm M-63B2, which was manufactured domestically.

The recoilless rifles were manufactured domestically and included 57 mm, 82 mm, and 105 mm models. Two self-propelled 82 mm recoilless rifles could be mounted on an M-60PB armored personnel carrier.

Anti-tank guided missiles were the Soviet AT-1 Snapper and AT-3 Sagger. They were used in both anti-tank and infantry units, but because of their early vintage, effectiveness against advanced armor was uncertain. The four wheeled BOV-1 armored reconnaissance vehicle could be equipped with six AT-3 launchers to serve as a highly mobile anti-tank platform.

== Air defence ==
Larger Yugoslav army units had considerable tactical air defence assets, designed to defend major troop concentrations against enemy air strikes. The ground forces had four surface-to-air missile regiments and eleven antiaircraft artillery regiments. The former operated large numbers of Soviet SA-6, SA-7, SA-9, SA-13, SA-14, SA-16 missiles. Short-range systems also were employed in infantry units.

Yugoslav antiaircraft artillery regiments operated over 5,000 guns. Self-propelled gun systems included the Soviet-made 57 mm dual ZSU-57-2 gun systems and the domestically produced triple 20 mm BOV-3s and dual 30 mm BOV-30s. Large numbers of towed antiaircraft guns of many calibers were in the inventory. Of both domestic and foreign origin, they included pieces purchased from the United States, Czechoslovakia, Switzerland, and Sweden.

=== Equipment ===
- Anti aircraft systems
  - 57 mm AZP S-60 – ?
  - Zastava M55 – ?
  - Bofors 40mm – 142
- Self-propelled Anti aircraft systems
  - BOV-3/30 – ~100
  - M53/59 Praga – 789
  - ZSU-57-2 – 125
- MANPAD's
  - Strela-2 – 4700
  - 9K34 Strela-3
  - 9K38 Igla
  - FIM-92 Stinger
- SAM's
  - 9K31 Strela-1 – 120
  - 9K35 Strela-10 – 18
  - S-75 Dvina – 60 (used by Air Force and Air Defence)
  - S-125 Neva – 60 (used by Air Force and Air Defence)
  - 2K12 Kub – 80~90 (used by Air Force and Air Defence)

== Coastal defence ==
The coastal artillery batteries had both surface-to-surface missiles and guns. They operated the Soviet-designed SS-C-3 and a truck-mounted, Yugoslav-produced Brom antiship missile which was essentially a Yugoslav variant of the Soviet SS-N-2. Coastal guns included over 400 85 mm, 88 mm, 122 mm, 130 mm, and 152 mm artillery pieces obtained from the Soviet Union, the United States, captured and refurbished Second World War German and Italian pieces, and Yugoslav manufacturers.

== Rank and uniforms ==
=== Uniforms ===
==== Enlisted and NCO's ====
Soldiers and NCOs were issued field uniforms and service uniforms, while NCOs were authorised a dress uniform. Military school cadets wore soldier's uniforms. Soldiers' winter and summer uniforms were made of light or heavy wool and cotton in olive-green. All soldiers wore neckties of the same colors except in summer, when the uniform shirt was worn with an open collar.

There were several variations on the basic soldier's uniform and women's uniforms were of the same style as those for men, with a skirt being substituted for trousers. Paratroops wore an olive-green beret instead of the standard garrison or service cap.

Mountain troops wore distinctive stiff field caps with semi-rigid visors and ear flaps. They wore loose winter shirts, under which additional layers could be worn. The shirt itself had a lining and a collar that could be turned up to cover the neck and chin. The trousers worn by mountain troops extended just below the knee, with a strap and buckle closure. Leather leggings, heavy wool socks, and foul-weather capes also were worn by the mountain troops.

Several different patterns of camouflage uniforms were worn by select units.

==== Officers ====
Officers had to buy their field, service, dress, and full dress uniforms. They wore insignia on the lapels of the field uniform shirts. The service uniform differed only in a few details from the basic dress uniform. The shirt buttons of the dress uniform were yellow-gold instead of the service color. The trousers, jackets, and overcoats were piped red along the seams. The dress cap visor showed the same piping as the officer's shoulder boards. The general officer's dress cap had a chin strap of twisted gold cord. Other officers wore plain plastic or leather chin straps. Full dress uniforms were blue and were worn with a yellow-gold sash belt lined with the appropriate service color. Cap emblems all included a red star with yellow-gold rays, given distinctive configurations according to branch. Airborne officers had the red star resting on a silver parachute against a blue background. Cap emblems for general officers showed the same gold wreath as the shoulder boards.

== See also ==
- Yugoslav Partisans
- Serbian Army
- Croatian Army
