= NPAP =

NPAP is an acronym which may refer to:

- National Psychological Association for Psychoanalysis
- Network Printing Alliance Protocol; see Printer Working Group
- National Police Accountability Project; see People's Law Office
- N-PAP, a variant of the Zastava PAP series of sporting rifles.
- New Product Approval Process, a corporate process designed to standardize how new products/services are commercialized.
- Naphthylpropylaminopentane, a monoaminergic drug
