= Zastava PAP series =

Serbian semi-automatic rifles/pistols

Zastava PAP
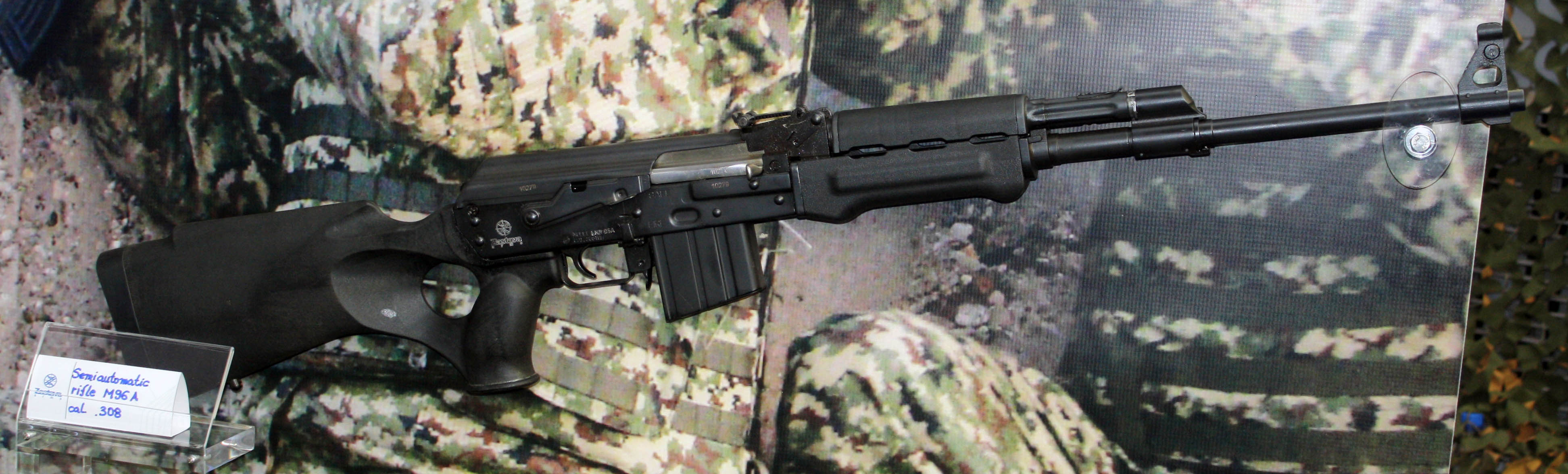
- Early version of Zastava PAP M77 known as M96A
- Type: Semi-automatic rifles/pistols
- Place of origin: FR Yugoslavia/Serbia

Production history
- Designed: late 1990s
- Manufacturer: Zastava Arms (formerly Crvena Zastava)
- Produced: 1990s–present
- Variants: PAP M70 7.62×39mm; PAP M77 .308 Winchester/7.62×51mm; PAP M85 .223 Remington/5.56×45mm; PAP M90 .223 Remington/5.56×45mm; PAP M92 7.62×39mm

Specifications
- Mass: 3.6 kg (7.9 lb) (PAP M70)
- Length: 940 mm (37 in) (PAP M70)
- Barrel length: 415 mm (16.3 in) (PAP M70)
- Action: Gas-operated, rotating bolt
- Feed system: Detachable box magazine
- Sights: Iron sights

The Zastava PAP (Serbian: Полу-аутоматска пушка/пиштољ / Polu-automatska puška/pištolj, "Semi-automatic rifle/pistol") are a series of Serbian sporting rifles based on the Zastava M70 and Zastava M77B1.

== Design ==
PAP rifles are nearly identical to their military counterparts, but lack select-fire capability and have been modified with a number of sporting features designed to comply with firearms imports laws in the United States, where they are primarily marketed.

For example, they are imported with thumbhole stocks, and lack the bayonet lugs, night sights, and grenade launcher sights.

Variants include the PAP M85 and M92, which are short-barreled models imported into the United States as pistols.

== Variants ==
=== PAP M70 ===
Based on the Zastava M70.

==== EAA PAP ====
Model originally imported by EAA Corp Slant cut 1.5mm receiver single stack bolt and bulged single stack trunnion, thumb-hole buttstock.

This model came in either wooden furniture and side optics rail or polymer furniture and dust cover Picatinny rail.

==== PAP M70 (Gen 1) ====
Straight-cut 1.5 mm receiver, single-stack 10-round magazine, single-stack bolt and bulged single-stack trunnion, dust cover Picatinny rail.

Century Arms International converted this model to look closer to the original M70.

Single-stack magazine wells and single-stack trunnions were widened to accept standard AK double-stack magazines together with a number of U.S.-made parts that were installed in order to make the rifle 922(r) compliant (muzzle brake, TAPCO G2 trigger group, new wooden furniture and pistol grip).

However, because this model came with single-stack bolt (originally intended for single-stack 10-round magazines) it caused some rifles to malfunction.

==== N-PAP M70 (Gen 2) ====
Straight-cut 1mm receiver, double-stack bolt, and double-stack "AKM" trunnion, side rail instead of dust cover rail.

Unlike the PAP (Gen 1), the N-PAP M70 (Gen 2) comes with a double-stack bolt and does not have the reliability problems of the Gen 1 model. This model is available in six different variants.

==== N-PAP DF ====
Under-folder version of the N-PAP with no side rail.

==== O-PAP M70 (Gen 3) ====
1.5mm receiver, uses double stack magazine, bulged "RPK" trunnion, M-21 side rail, comes with oiled surplus furniture.

==== Z-PAP M70 (Gen 4) ====
Straight-cut 1.0mm stamped receiver, double stack bolt, forged barrel trunnion, comes with new walnut wood or polymer furniture. Imported solely through "Zastava USA", a Zastava Arms owned subsidiary.

In April 2020, it was announced that all future Z-PAP M70 rifles manufactured by Zastava Arms would now feature a 1.5mm receiver and bulged "RPK" trunnions, like the O-PAP M70.

In addition, Zastava will now chrome-line the barrels of the Z-PAP M70, marking the first time the company used chrome in the lining of a barrel for any rifle chambered in the 7.62×39mm round.

=== PAP M77 PS ===
Civilian version of Zastava M77B1, chambered in .308/7.62×51mm, using 10-round magazine.

=== PAP M85 ===
==== PAP M85 PV ====
The semi-automatic only version of Zastava M85 imported as a pistol to the United States.

==== PAP M85 NP ====
The semi-automatic only model with a standard AR-15 magazine adapter.

=== PAP M92 PV ===
The semi-automatic only version of Zastava M92 imported as a pistol to the United States.

== See also ==
- Saiga semi-automatic rifle
- WASR series rifles
