= Pridvorica, Gacko =

Pridvorica Придворица
- Village
- Location within Bosnia and Herzegovina
- Coordinates: 43°10′N 18°32′E
- Country: Bosnia and Herzegovina
- Entity: Republika Srpska
- Municipality: Gacko

Population (2013)
  - Total: 13
- Time zone: UTC+1 (CET)
  - Summer (DST): UTC+2 (CEST)
- Area code: 59

Pridvorica (Serbian Cyrillic: Придворица) is a small village located in the municipality of Gacko in Republika Srpska, Bosnia and Herzegovina.

== History ==
During World War II, in January 1942, happened the Pridvorica massacre. The mass killing of 180 Serb civilians by Muslim members of the Croatian fascist Ustaše movement.

== Demographics ==
According to the 2013 census, its population was 13, all Serbs.

== Notable residents ==
- Blagoje Adžić
