= Zorko Čanadi =

General of the Yugoslav People's Army

General Zorko Čanadi
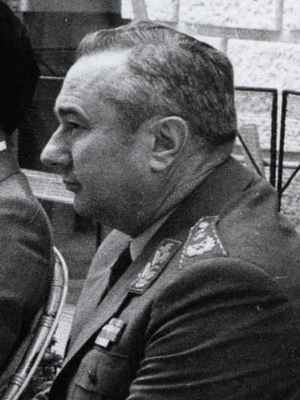
- Lieutenant General Zorko Čanadi on 27 July 1979.
- Born: 25 July 1925; Orahovica, Kingdom of Serbs, Croats and Slovenes (modern Croatia)
- Died: 24 August 2003 (aged 78); Belgrade, Serbia and Montenegro (modern Serbia)
- Military career
- Allegiance: Yugoslavia
- Branch: Yugoslav People's Army: Ground Forces
- Service years: 1943–1987
- Rank: Colonel General
- Commands: Chief of the General Staff of the Yugoslav People's Army (1985–1987)
- Conflicts: World War II

Zorko Čanadi (25 July 1925 – 24 August 2003) was a general of the Yugoslav People's Army (JNA).

== Biography ==
In 1943, during World War II in Yugoslavia, Čanadi joined both the Yugoslav Partisans and the League of Communists of Yugoslavia (SKJ). He was promoted to Major General in 1972, Lieutenant General in 1976 and Colonel General in 1982. In the 1970s and the 1980s, he held a number of senior positions in the Yugoslav People's Army (JNA). He was chief of staff and therefore deputy commander of the First Army in 1974–1978, and commander of the Fifth Army in 1980–1985. In 1985–1987, he held the position of the Chief of the General Staff of the JNA. He retired from active military service on 31 December 1987.

== Literature ==
- Vojni leksikon. „Vojnoizdavački zavod“ Beograd, 1981. godina.
- Ivetić, Velimir (2000). Načelnici generalštaba 1876—2000. Beograd: Novinsko-informativni centar VOJSКA.

Military offices
Preceded by Petar Gračanin	Chief of the General Staff of the Yugoslav People's Army; 1 September 1985 – 15 September 1987	Succeeded by Stevan Mirković
