= Pridvorica massacre =

1942 killing of Serb civilians in Croatia

- Part of World War II in Yugoslavia
- Location: 43°10′N 18°32′E; Pridvorica, Independent State of Croatia
- Date: 7 January 1942
- Target: Serbs
- Attack type: Summary executions
- Deaths: 180
- Perpetrator: Ustaše

The Pridvorica massacre was the mass killing of 180 Serb civilians by Muslim members of the Croatian fascist Ustaše movement on 7 January 1942, during World War II.

== Background ==
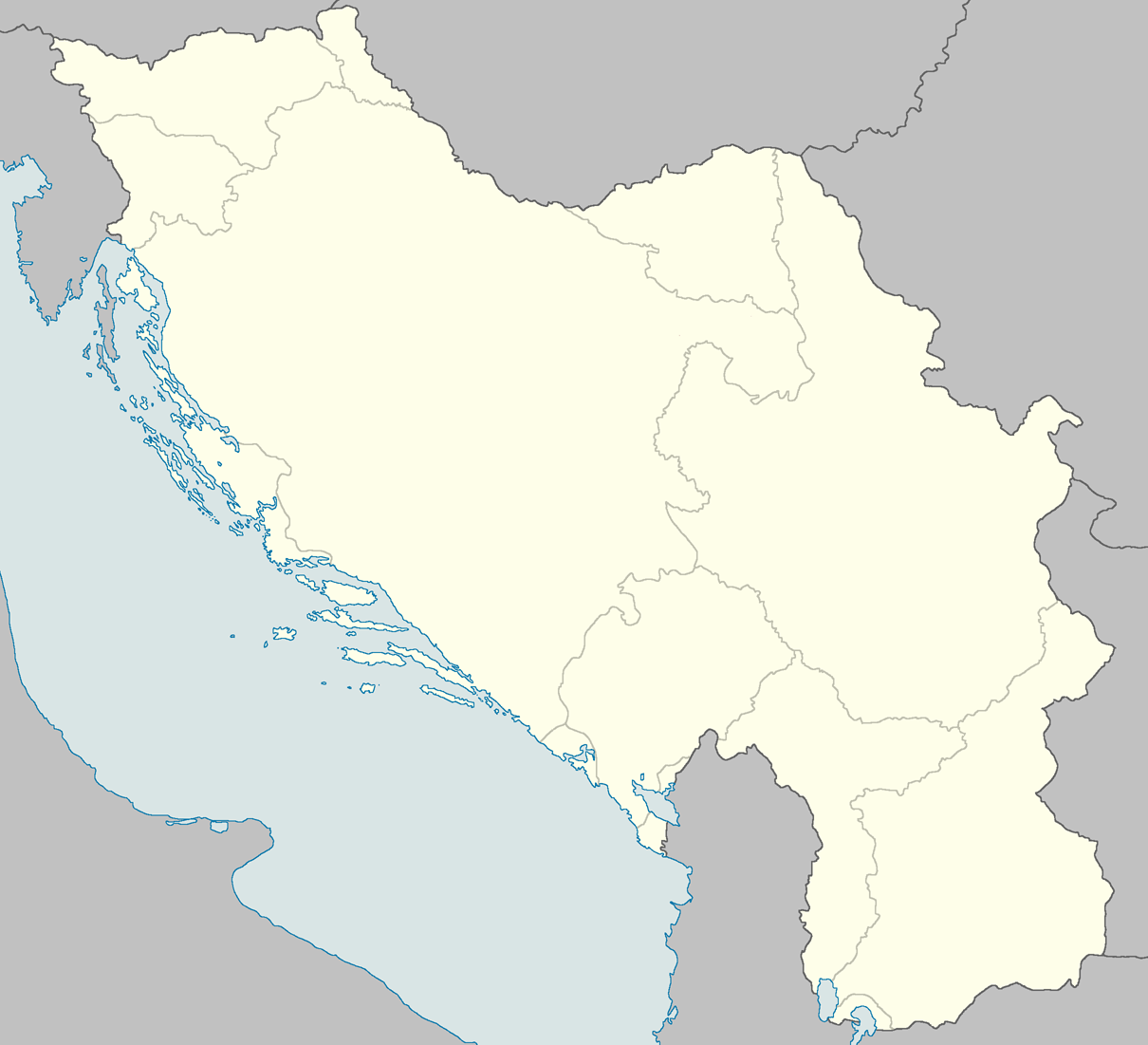
Location of Pridvorica on a map of Occupied Yugoslavia

On 6 April 1941, Yugoslavia was invaded by the Axis powers. The ensuing capitulation resulted in its territory being divided between Germany and its allies. Adolf Hitler set up the Independent State of Croatia (NDH), a puppet-state which covered present-day Croatia (excluding Dalmatia), all of present-day Bosnia and Herzegovina and parts of present-day Serbia. The Croatian fascist ultranationalist Ustaše movement were appointed to rule the new state with Ante Pavelić installed as the leader. The Ustaše then embarked on a campaign of genocide against the Serb, Jewish and Roma population within their borders. Muslims were not persecuted due to the belief that they were descendants of Croats who had converted to Islam. A great deal of the Muslim population sided with the Ustaše while others joined the Communist Partisans.

According to the 1931 census, the municipality of Gacko (of which Pridvorica is part) had a population of 15,233 of whom 5,724 were Muslims. Taking into account the nearby municipality of Nevesinje, the two regions' Serb population constituted 67%, Muslim 28% and Croat nearly 4%.

With the signing of the Treaties of Rome between Fascist Italy and the NDH, Ustaša units began their administrative takeover following Italy's withdrawal from zone III. Local upper-class Muslims were put in charge of Gacko. A group of Ustašas led by Herman "Krešo" Togonal arrived and began organizing a local command in Gacko. They attempted to win over the support of the Muslims by promising them among other things, the return of landholdings they lost during the agrarian reforms of the 1920s and the building of mosques in villages.

Historian Tomislav Dulić notes that Ustaše success in carrying out massacres often depended on them securing the support and trust of local Croats and Muslims, and that "Where such pacification succeeded, they were more or less free to initiate the destruction process." Togonal held a meeting with local Muslims where he presented a historical exposition and outlined the Ustaše's ideological views on the Muslim population. He finished the meeting by arguing that all Serbs had to be killed: "We cannot be satisfied and will not stop until the total extermination of the last Serb from our Independent State of Croatia. The last bullet for the last Serb."

== Massacre ==
In order to implement the decisions of the Resolution of Mostar Muslims, the Ustaše, together with Muslims from neighboring villages, killed the entire Serb population of Pridvorica which numbered about 180 locals including women, children and the elderly. The killings were carried out with firearms and knives with most of the inhabitants killed by being locked up in barns and set on fire. The massacre occurred on 7 January 1942 which is the day Serbian Orthodox Christians celebrate Christmas.

The remains were buried in two graves next to the local Holy Prince Lazar Serbian Orthodox church on 17 April 1942, and they were not transferred to the church's crypt until 29 November 2006.

As a child, Blagoje Adžić witnessed the slaughter of his family in the massacre while hiding in a tree.

== See also ==
- The Dagger (1999 film), loosely based on the events in the Pridvorica massacre

== Sources ==
- Byford, Jovan (2020). Picturing Genocide in the Independent State of Croatia: Atrocity Images and the Contested Memory of the Second World War in the Balkans. Bloomsbury Publishing. ISBN 978-1-35001-598-2.
- Dulic, Tomislav (2005). Utopias of Nation: Local Mass Killing in Bosnia and Herzegovina, 1941-42. Coronet Books Incorporated. ISBN 978-9-15546-302-1.
- Dulic, Tomislav (22 November 2011). "Gacko massacre, June 1941". sciencespo.fr. The Paris Institute of Political Studies.
- Hoare, Marko Attila (2006). Genocide and Resistance in Hitler's Bosnia: The Partisans and the Chetniks, 1941-1943. Oxford University Press. ISBN 978-0-19726-380-8.
- Levy, Michele Frucht (2013). Crowe, David M. (ed.). Crimes of State Past and Present: Government-Sponsored Atrocities and International Legal Responses. Routledge. ISBN 978-1-31798-682-9.
- Milazzo, Matteo J. (2019). The Chetnik Movement and the Yugoslav Resistance. Johns Hopkins University Press. ISBN 978-1-42143-340-0.
- Redzic, Enver; Donia, Robert (2004). Bosnia and Herzegovina in the Second World War. Routledge. ISBN 978-1-13576-735-8.
- Rodogno, Davide (2006). Fascism's European Empire: Italian Occupation During the Second World War. Cambridge University Press. ISBN 978-0-52184-515-1.
- Tomasevich, Jozo (2001). War and Revolution in Yugoslavia, 1941–1945: Occupation and Collaboration. Stanford, California: Stanford University Press. ISBN 978-0-8047-3615-2.
