= The Dagger (1999 film) =

- Directed by: Miroslav Lekić
- Written by: Miroslav Lekić; Slobodan Stojanović
- Based on: Nož by Vuk Drašković
- Produced by: Bojan Maljević; Bojana Maljević
- Starring: Žarko Laušević; Bojana Maljević
- Cinematography: Veljko Despotović
- Edited by: Branislav Milošević
- Music by: Toma Babović; Aleksandar Milić
- Distributed by: Monte Royal Pictures
- Release date: 1999
- Running time: 135 minutes
- Country: Serbia and Montenegro
- Language: Serbian

The Dagger (Serbian: Нож, romanized: Nož, lit. 'Knife') is a 1999 Serbian war film directed by Miroslav Lekić. The film was written by Miroslav Lekić, Slobodan Stanojević and Igor Bojović. The plot is based on Vuk Drašković's novel of the same name.

Set in the 1960s and observed from the point of view of Alija Osmanović, a young Muslim medical student raised by a single mother, his entire family was slaughtered and his baby brother kidnapped by Chetniks during the Second World War, as the aftermath of a violent family feud between the Jugović (Christian) and Osmanović (Muslim) families. He not only learns that the Osmanović family were once a branch of the Jugović family who converted to Islam during the Ottoman era, but that, unbeknownst to his mother, he himself was a baby taken from the Jugović family, after the massacre on Christmas Eve in 1942. With both families now extinct, and Alija, as the descendant of both, torn between two cultures and two identities, he struggles to maintain his inner peace, desperately searching for his long lost step-brother and fighting the prejudices against the romantic relationship he has with a Serbian classmate.

The film is based on fictive events of World War II and is centered on the atrocious crimes committed during that period, in particular the Jugović and Osmanović families. According to Vuk Drašković, the original novel is loosely based on the Pridvorica massacre.

In 1999, the film was screened at the 13th Montenegro Film Festival, and gained five featured awards. The film also earned the "Fipresci Award" for Directing, five acting awards in the Niš Film Festival and the “Crystal Star” at the Brussels Film Festival.

== Cast ==
- Žarko Laušević: Alija Osmanović / Ilija Jugović
- Bojana Maljević: Milica Janković
- Aleksandar Berček: Halil 'Sikter' Efendija
- Ljiljana Blagojević: Rabija Osmanović
- Petar Božović: Sabahudin Aga / Atifaga Tanović
- Velimir 'Bata' Zivojinovic: Nićifor Jugović
- Nikola Kojo: Milan Vilenjak
- Svetozar Cvetković: Selim Osmanović
- Josif Tatić: Kemal Osmanović
- Dragan Nikolić: Hodža
- Dragan Maksimović: Zulfikar
