= Ninth Army (Yugoslavia) =

The Ninth Army was a military formation of the Yugoslav Ground Forces which supervised forces in Slovenia from 1968 to 1988. It was abolished under the "Jedinstvo" (Unity) reorganisation of 1987-88.

During its existence the army had four generals of Slovenian ethnicity on its staff (General Franc Poglajen, the first commander; Chief of Staff Janko Sekirnik; Franc Tavčar; and Jože Jakomin). General Franc Tavčar succeeded General Poglajen. Later generals commanding were General Branko Jerkič (appointed in autumn 1980) and General Svetozar Višnjić.

Under the F-85 organizational structure, the 14th Proletarian Infantry Division "Boris Kidrič" was reorganized and transformed into the 14th Proletarian Motorized Division, consisting of two motorized brigades, and the 14th Infantry Regiment. The headquarters of the division was located in the building that today houses the Notranjska Museum Postojna (Notranjski muzej Postojna) at Kolodvorska cesta 3 in Postojna. It served as the Command Building (Komanda) of the 14th Proletarian Division (military post code VP 1101 Postojna) until the division was disbanded on 30 September 1988.

In the 1980s its most important forces included the 14th Proletarian Motorised Division "Boris Kidrič" at Postojna; the 31st Infantry Division at Maribor; the 1st Armoured Brigade at Vrhnika; two anti-tank artillery regiment; an anti-aircraft regiment; and the 15th, 29th, and 30th second-line divisions, "partisan" formations of three brigades and a divizion (artillery battalion) of 18 120mm pieces (possibly actually 122 mm howitzer 2A18 (D-30) howitzers).
