= Zastava M92 =

Autoloading rifle

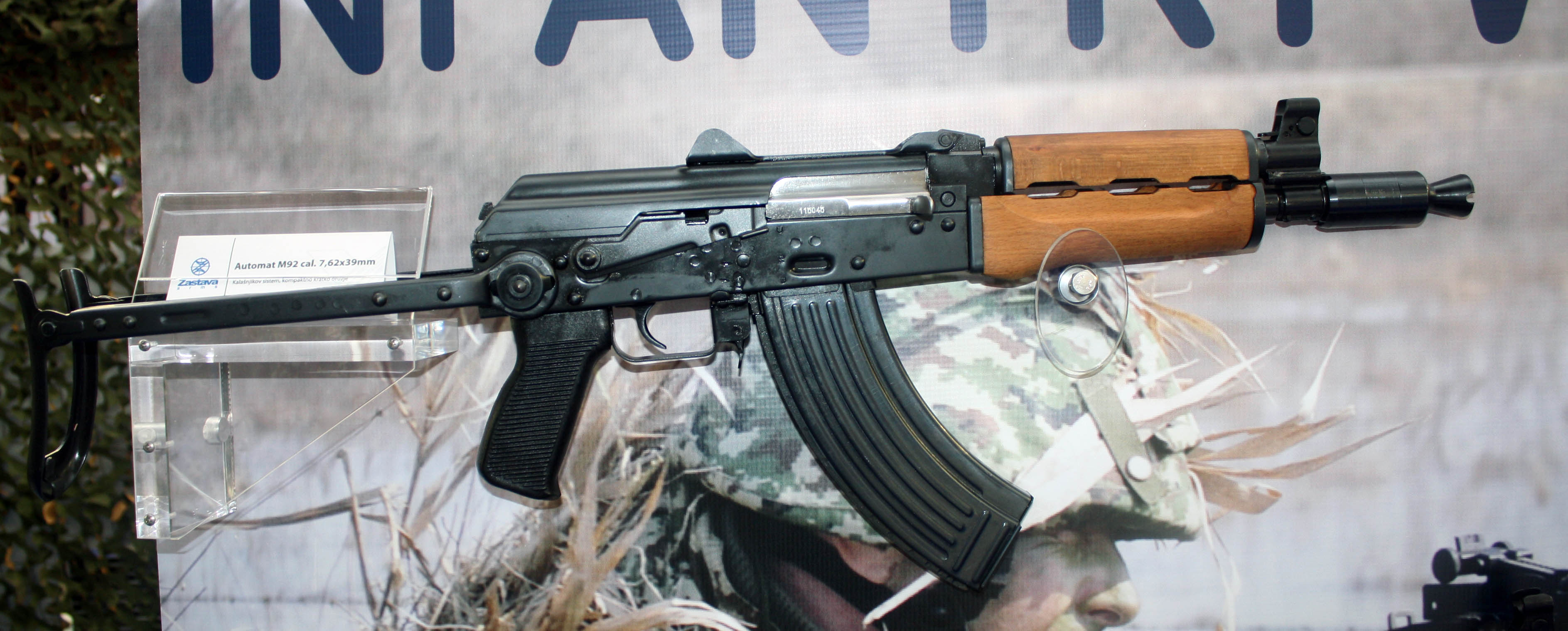
- Zastava M92
- Type: Carbine
- Place of origin: Yugoslavia/Serbia

Service history
- In service: 1992–present
- Wars: Yugoslav Wars; Kivu conflict Libyan Civil War; Banjska attack

Production history
- Manufacturer: Zastava Arms
- Produced: since 1992

Specifications
- Mass: 3.57 kg (7.87 lb)
- Length: 795 mm (31.30 in) stock extended 550 mm (21.65 in) stock folded
- Barrel length: 254 mm (10.0 in)
- Cartridge: 7.62×39mm
- Action: Gas-operated, rotating bolt
- Rate of fire: 620 rounds per minute
- Muzzle velocity: 678 m/s (2,224 ft/s)
- Effective firing range: 200-400 m
- Feed system: 5, 10, 30, 40 round box magazine or 75, 100 round drum magazine
- Sights: Adjustable iron sights, optional mount required for optical sights

The M92 is a carbine developed and manufactured by Zastava Arms since 1992. It is nearly identical to the Zastava M85 carbine; the only differences between the two being caliber and correspondingly, magazine design. The M92 is a shortened version of the Zastava M70 assault rifle, which is a modified copy of the Soviet AKM assault rifle.

== Overview ==
The Zastava M92 chambers and fires the Soviet 7.62×39mm round. It is a gas-operated, air-cooled, magazine-fed, and select-fire carbine. In general design, it is a modified hybrid of the Soviet AKMS and the AKS-74U carbine, featuring the underfolding stock of the AKMS but overall layout of the AKS-74U. It is easily distinguished by the Zastava-specific design of the pistol grip and especially by the longer Beech-wood handguard, featuring three cooling vents instead of the usual two.

In contrast to the full-size M70 counterpart, the M92 also features a shorter 10.0in barrel. Unlike most rifle rounds which would otherwise experience a significant drop in velocity out of a short barrel, the 7.62×39mm round loses very little velocity when compared to a full-length barrel, making it an excellent round for carbines.

== Design and features ==
The M92 is a gas-operated, air-cooled, magazine-fed, select-fire carbine with an underfolding stock. In contrast to the M70, the M92 also features a moderator on the barrel end, similar to the AKS-74U. Contrary to popular belief, the moderator is not intended to conceal muzzle flash, rather it is intended to burn the remaining powder left due to the short barrel (a design first seen on the XM177 carbines).

Like most carbine rifles, the M92 has a shorter effective range and lower penetration when compared to full-size rifle counterparts, counterbalanced by better maneuverability in close combat, improved handling, lighter weight, and a higher rate of fire. Due to its portability and ease of concealment, it is a popular choice for vehicle crews, special forces, policemen and officers.

== Users ==
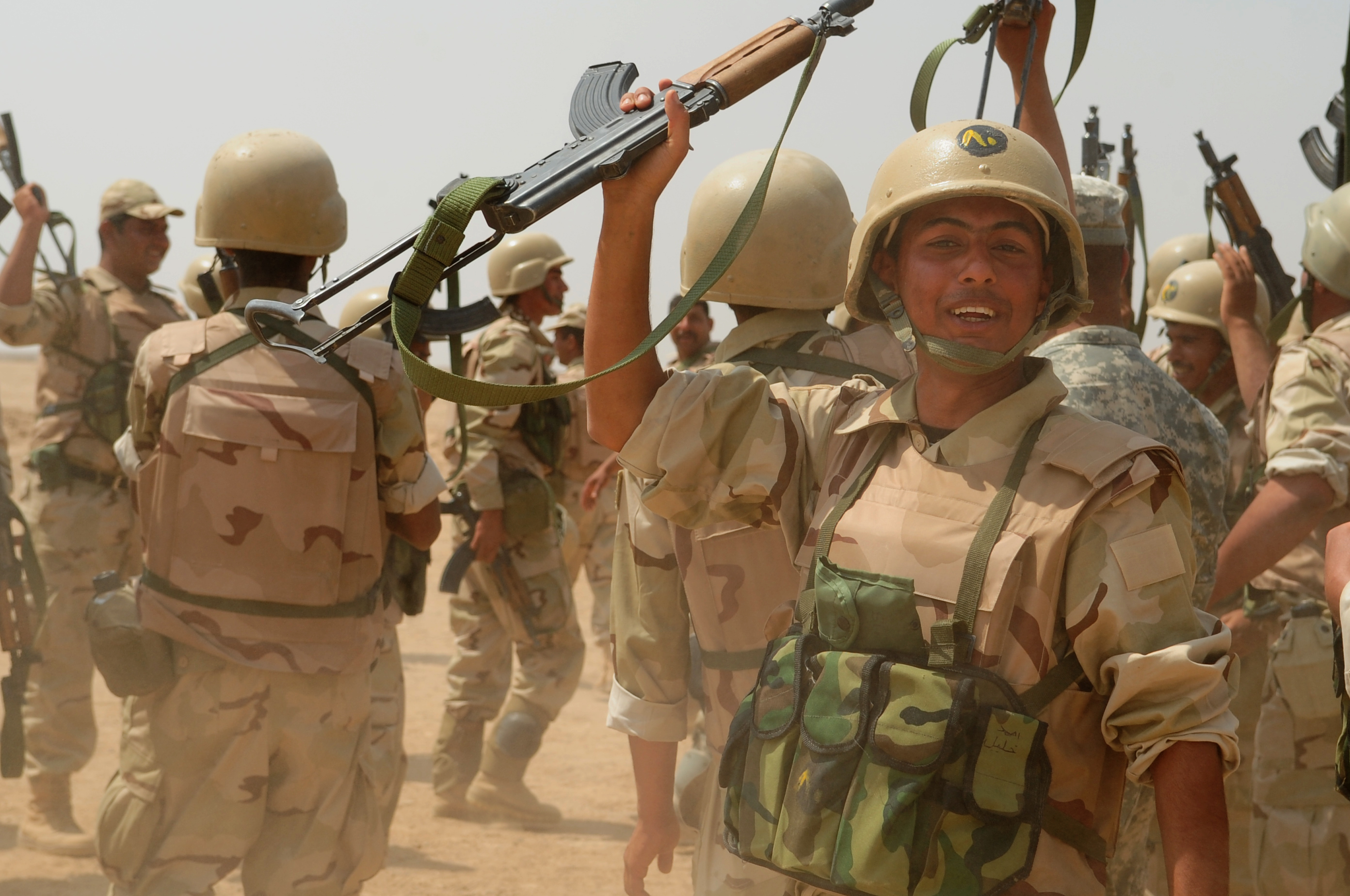
Iraqi soldiers with M92s.

- Democratic Republic of the Congo
- Iraq: Produced copies under license from Yugoslavia, primarily at the Al-Qadissiya Establishments.
- Jordan
- Lebanon
- Libya: 80,000 bought in 2008-2009.
- Nicaragua
- North Macedonia: Used by the Army of North Macedonia.
- Palestine: Used by Palestinian presidential guard and security forces.
- Republika Srpska: Used by officers in later stages of the Bosnian War
- Republic of Serb Krajina: Both Zastava M92 and M85 used by members of the 11th Eastern Slavonian Corps of the Army of Serb Krajina.
- Serbia: Used by Special Forces (formerly also used by the Special Operations Unit).

== See also ==
- Zastava PAP series
- Zastava M70
- Zastava M85
- AKS-74U
- Carbine
