= Blagoje Adžić =

Minister of Defence of Yugoslavia (1932–2012)

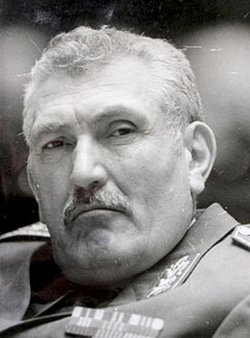
- Born: 2 September 1932; Pridvorica, Kingdom of Yugoslavia (modern Bosnia and Herzegovina)
- Died: 1 March 2012 (aged 79); Belgrade, Serbia
- Military career
- Allegiance: Yugoslavia
- Branch: Yugoslav People's Army: Ground Forces
- Service years: 1953–1992
- Rank: Colonel General
- Awards: Order of the People's Army with Golden Star (II rank), Order of the People's Army with Silver Star (III rank), Order of Military Merits with Golden Swords (II rank), Order of Military Merits with Golden Swords (III rank)

Blagoje Adžić (Serbian Cyrillic: Благоје Аџић, pronounced [blâɡoje ǎdʒitɕ]; 2 September 1932 – 1 March 2012) was a Serbian colonel general who served as an acting Minister of Defence in the government of the former Yugoslavia at the time of the Yugoslav breakup.

== Biography ==
Adžić was born into a Serb family in the village of Pridvorica (near Gacko), Zeta Banovina, Kingdom of Yugoslavia in what is now Republika Srpska, Bosnia and Herzegovina. As a child, he witnessed the slaughter of his family by Muslim members of the Croatian fascist Ustaše movement rampaging through his village while he was hiding in a tree. Forty-two members of the Adžić family, including Blagoje's parents, sister and two brothers, were killed by his neighbors.

After his third year in industrial school, he graduated from officer training school in 1953. After he had graduated, he also received a diploma in foreign languages from the JNA military school. He traveled to the Soviet Union and graduated from the Frunze Military Academy in 1969, and then graduated from JNA War College in 1973. He became Deputy Commander of the 7th Army in 1986 and held that position until 1987, when he was promoted to Lieutenant General. Adžić then graduated from the People's Defence School in 1987. He held a number of posts in the JNA including commander of the 1st and 3rd battalions of the 4th Proletariat Infantry Regiment, commander of the 25th and 26th Infantry Division and commander of 52nd Corps. He served ten other smaller posts all throughout his military career.

He held the position of Deputy Chief of Staff in the Yugoslav Army Headquarters until 29 September 1989 when he was promoted to Colonel General and to the post of Chief of the General Staff. He held office until 8 May 1992, when he resigned, and was succeeded by Života Panić.

After Veljko Kadijević resigned from his post, Adžić also served as the acting Federal Secretary of People's Defence from 8 January 1992 until 27 February 1992.

According to Marko Hoare, a former employee at the ICTY, an investigative team worked on indictments of persons whom they labelled a 'joint criminal enterprise', including Adžić, Slobodan Milošević, Veljko Kadijević, Borisav Jović, Branko Kostić, Momir Bulatović and others. Hoare claims that, due to Carla del Ponte's intervention, these drafts were rejected, and the indictment limited to Milošević alone, as a result of which most of these individuals were never indicted.

Adžić died on 1 March 2012, aged 79, in Belgrade. He was buried on 3 March 2012 at the Central Cemetery in Voždovac, Belgrade with full military honours.

Military offices
Preceded by Stevan Mirković	Chief of the General Staff of the Yugoslav People's Army; 29 September 1989 – 27 February 1992	Succeeded by Života Panić
