= Zastava M77 B1 =

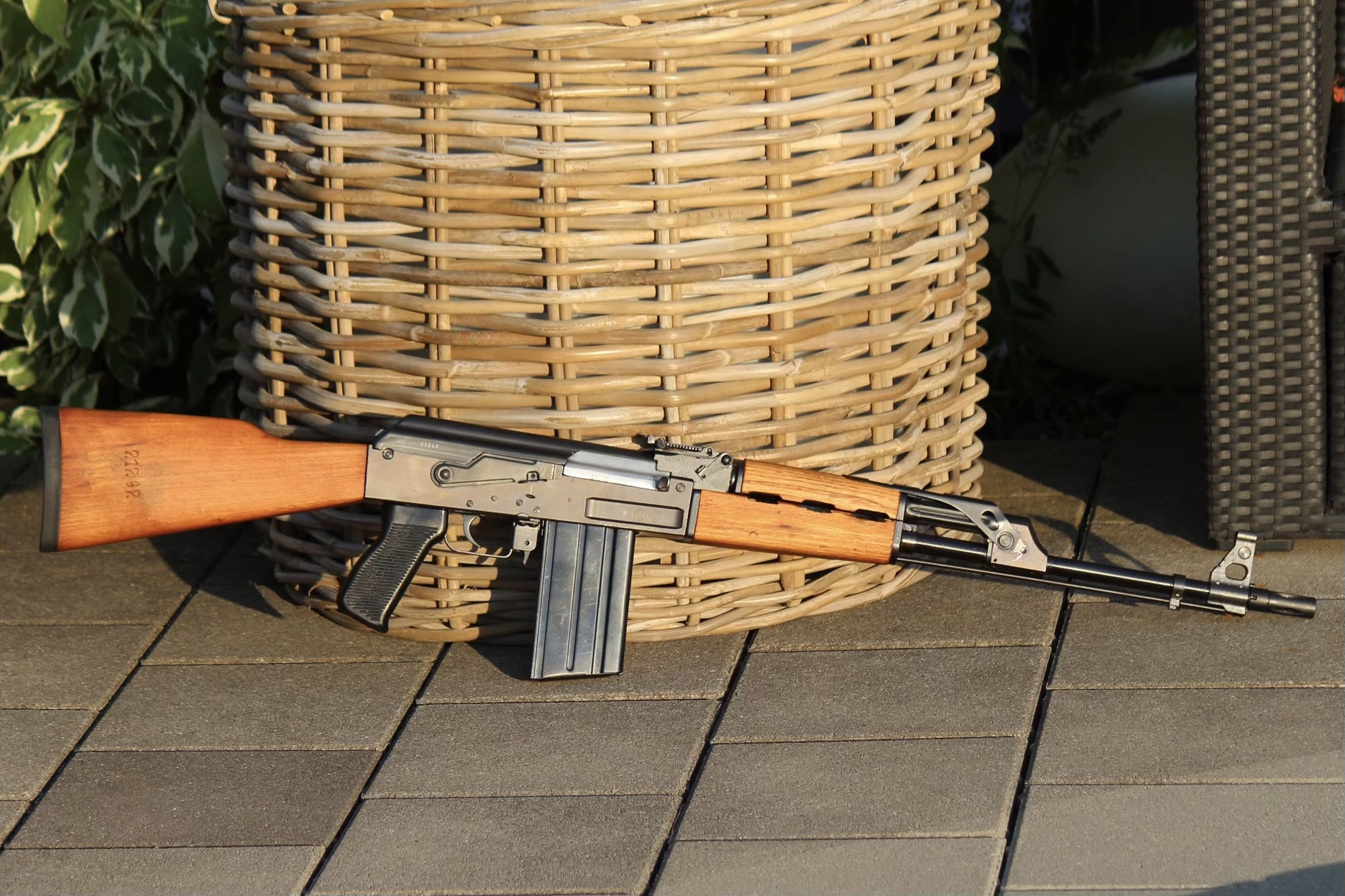
- Zastava M77 B1
- Type: Battle rifle
- Place of origin: Yugoslavia/Serbia

Service history
- In service: 1977–present
- Used by: Yugoslavia
- Wars: Yugoslav Wars

Production history
- Designed: 1977
- Manufacturer: Zastava Arms
- Produced: 1977–present
- Variants: M77 B1, M77 AB1

Specifications
- Mass: 4.35 kg
- Length: 1035 mm
- Barrel length: 500 mm
- Cartridge: 7.62×51mm NATO
- Action: Gas-actuated (rotating bolt)
- Rate of fire: 620 rnd/min
- Muzzle velocity: 840 m/s
- Effective firing range: 800 m
- Feed system: 10-, or 20-round detachable box magazine
- Sights: Adjustable iron sights, optional mount required for optical sights, flip up sights for rifle grenades

The Zastava M77 B1 is a battle rifle developed and manufactured by Zastava Arms in Serbia (formerly Yugoslavia). It was introduced in 1977. It is a derivative of the Zastava M70 and modified copy of the Soviet AKM chambered in 7.62×51mm with an enlarged receiver, and a Western-style flash suppressor. It is gas-operated, air-cooled, magazine-fed, selective fire battle rifle with a fixed wooden stock. The M77 AB1 has a folding stock. Early versions had a milled receiver and an adjustable gas block with flip up rifle grenade sights.

The M77PS, a semiautomatic variant of this rifle was imported by Century Arms into the U.S. in 2014 and 2015, chambered in .308/7.62x51 NATO. It has a polymer thumbhole stock and a 10rd magazine. The receiver is a heavy 1.5mm RPK type with a bulged front trunnion and an optics rail. The barrel is of medium profile and not chrome lined. The bolt and bolt carrier are polished. It came with a muzzle nut and threaded in M14-1.0LH. It was sold by several distributors for about $550, and increased in price over time, due to its rarity. The rifle can be converted back to its original military configuration by changing the polymer furniture to wood and adding a pistol grip. The rear of the receiver has a proprietary slant cut making it necessary for the wood stock to be modified or the use of an adapter plate for proper fitting.

One of the unique features of this rifle is that it has an adjustable gas system with 3 settings, aiding suppressor use.

== Annotations ==
It is known in Serbian as Automatska puška M77 B1 (М77 Б1). Formerly, it was designated M77B1 (М77Б1), or Automatska puška M.1977B1. It is sometimes confused with the similar Zastava M77.

== Users ==
- Mali

=== Former users ===
- Cyprus
- Yugoslavia
