= Zastava M70 (assault rifle) =

Yugoslav assault rifle

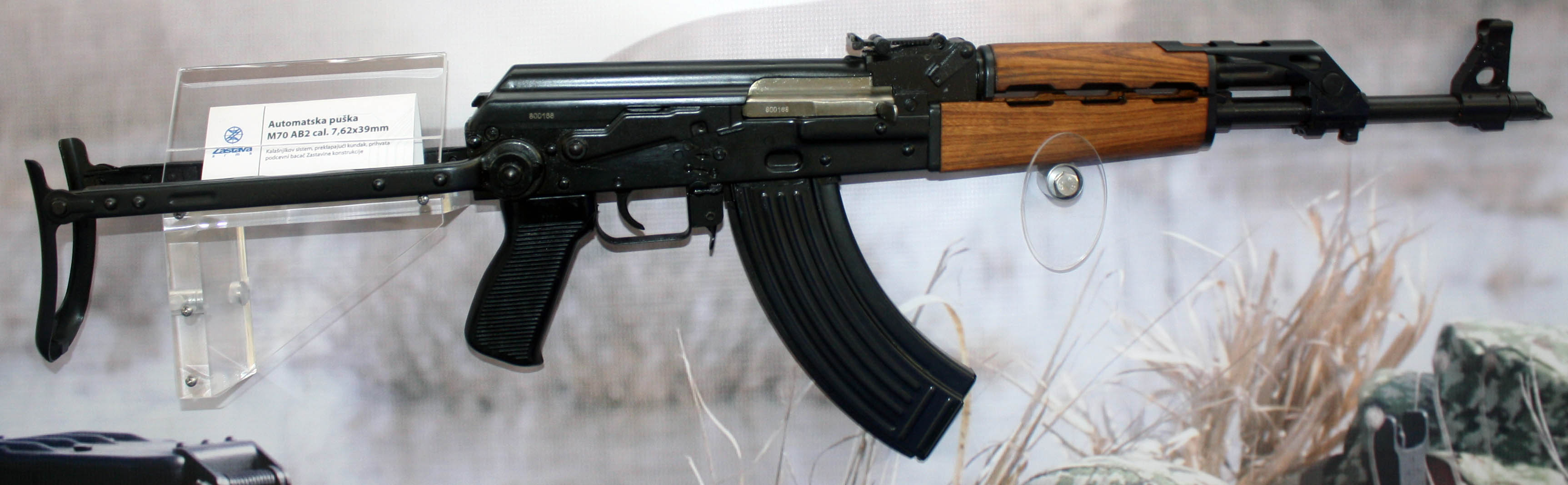
- A Zastava M70AB2
- Place of origin: Yugoslavia

Service history
- In service: 1970–1982 (limited use); 1982–present (standard service rifle)
- Used by: See Users
- Wars: Cold War; Rhodesian Bush War; South African Border War; Lebanese Civil War; Iran–Iraq War; Persian Gulf War; Yugoslav Wars; Kosovo War; Insurgency in Macedonia; Rwandan Civil War; First Congo War; War in Afghanistan; Iraq War; Kivu conflict; Libyan Civil War; Syrian civil war; Northern Mali conflict; War in Iraq; Russo-Ukrainian War; Russian invasion of Ukraine; Gaza War

Production history
- Designer: Zastava Arms
- Designed: 1962–1968
- Manufacturer: Zastava Arms
- Produced: 1970–present
- No. built: 4,000,000
- Variants: See Variants

Specifications
- Mass: 3.70 kg (8.2 lb)
- Length: 890 mm (35 in)
- Barrel length: 415 mm (16.3 in)
- Cartridge: 7.62×39mm
- Action: Gas-operated (rotating bolt)
- Rate of fire: 600–650 rounds/min
- Muzzle velocity: 720 m/s (2,400 ft/s)
- Effective firing range: 350 m (380 yd)
- Feed system: 30-round AK-47 detachable magazine
- Sights: Iron sights graduated from 100 to 1,000 meters

The Zastava M70 (Serbian Cyrillic: Застава М70) is a 7.62×39mm rifle developed in Yugoslavia by Zastava Arms. Due to political differences between the Soviet Union and Yugoslavia at the time, namely the latter's refusal to join the Warsaw Pact, the M70 was an unlicensed derivative of the Soviet AK-47, specifically the Type 3 variant. As such, Zastava was unable to directly obtain the technical specifications for the AK and opted to reverse engineer the weapon. The M70 has unique in-built features that enables it to fire rifle grenades. These include a thicker receiver, a new latch for the dust cover to ensure it would not be jarred loose by a grenade discharge, and a folding grenade sight bracket over the rifle's gas block, which also shuts off the gas system when raised.

The M70 became the standard issue infantry weapon in the Yugoslav People's Army in 1970, complementing and later superseding the Zastava M59/66. The M70 was also used by factions such as Republika Srpska in the Bosnian War alongside the AK-74 and other weapons. Both the original M70 design, as well as commercial variants of the weapon without select-fire capability, known as the Zastava PAP series, are still produced by Zastava for export.

== History ==
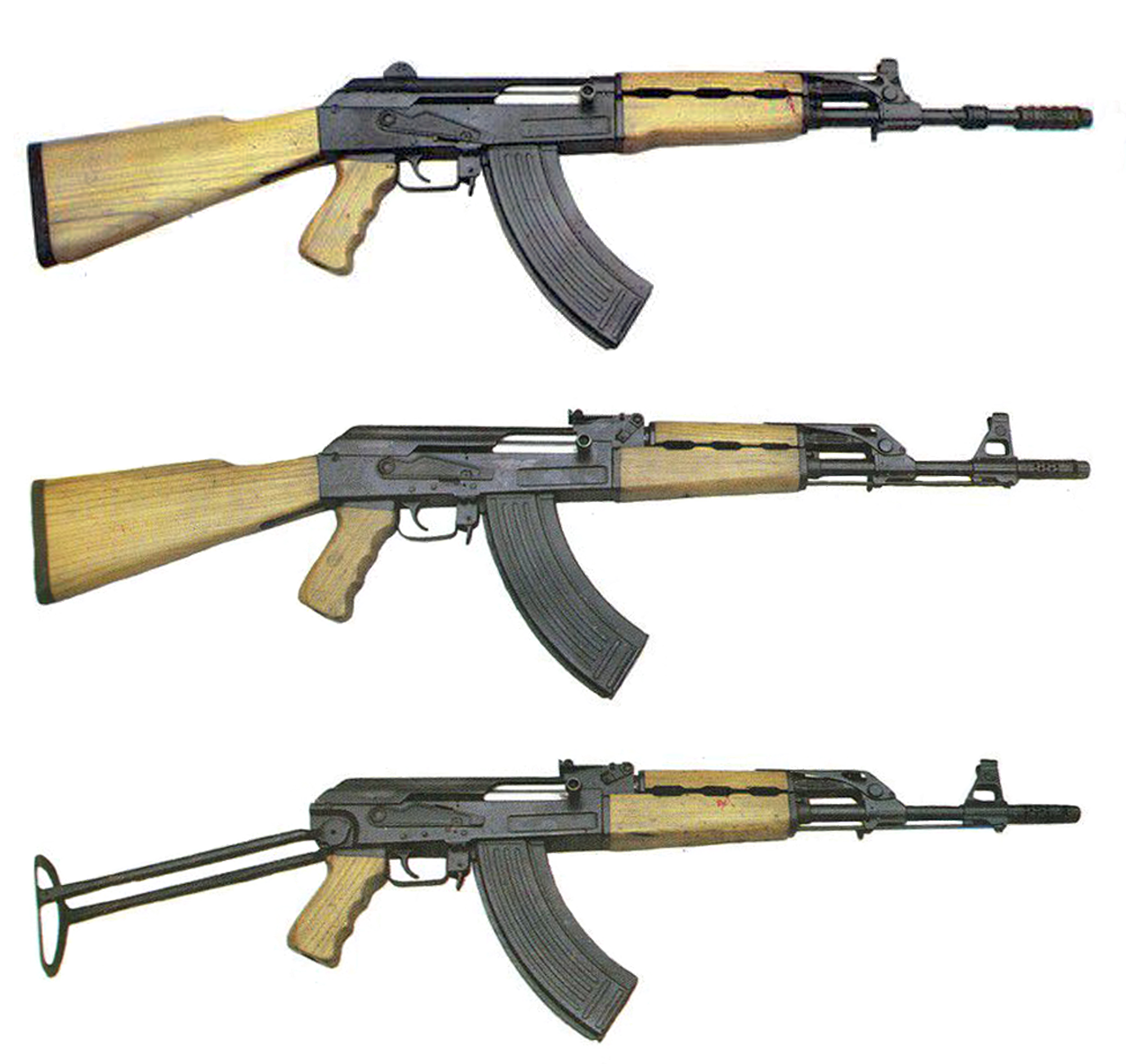
Various Zastava M64 prototypes. The top, designated simply as the M64, is the first AK derivative to be produced by Zastava. The M64 in the middle is designated as the M64A, and the M64 in the bottom is designated as the M64B

Beginning in 1952, Yugoslavia's defence industry had been experimenting with new automatic rifle designs, mostly patterned after the German StG 44, an unknown quantity of which had been captured by Yugoslav Partisans during World War II. In 1959, two Albanian soldiers defected to Yugoslavia with Soviet AK-47s, which were promptly passed on by the Yugoslav government to be inspected by Zastava engineers. Zastava was able to make metal castings of the two sample AKs, but could not glean enough technical data to reproduce the rifles or their associated parts. By the end of the year, however, the Yugoslav government had obtained more early pattern AKs from an unidentified Third World nation that was receiving Soviet military aid, most likely Egypt. At this point, there were enough AKs in Zastava's possession for its engineers to study and effectively reverse engineer the weapon type. Unlicensed production of an AK-47 derivative commenced in 1964.

The first domestic Kalashnikov rifles submitted by Zastava for military field trials were unofficially designated M64 and incorporated a milled receiver based heavily on that of the AK Type 3 but with several cosmetic differences. For example, while the right side of the receiver was almost indistinguishable from that of the AK-47, the left side of the receiver had a raised step, which flared out to accommodate the proprietary bolt hold-open device. The M64 had a threaded barrel which resembled that of the AK-47 but was slightly thicker and not chrome-lined like its Soviet counterpart. It was also equipped with a ladder sight for launching rifle grenades, which was folded against the upper handguard when not in use. The sight functioned as a gas shutoff to enable the safe launching of a grenade when locked into place. This design would later be incorporated into Zastava's M59/66 derivative of the Soviet SKS carbine. As the recoil from the rifle grenade could dislodge the standard AK dust cover, this was replaced with a new design that utilized a spring-loaded bolt. The stock of the M64 was also fitted with a heavy rubber recoil pad to help absorb the recoil. The M64 was fed from modified AK-pattern magazines and was manufactured with a device that left the bolt open after the last round in the magazine had been fired. It also possessed longer handguards that were not interchangeable with the Soviet type. The placement of the AK-47's rear sight was moved even further to the rear, giving the operator a longer sight radius.

Although performances during field trials were satisfactory, the Yugoslav People's Army did not adopt the M64 in large numbers, and continued to refine the design. The M64 was produced in three iterations for trials purposes: a variant with a wooden stock and a 20 inch barrel, a variant with a fixed wooden stock and a 16.3 inch barrel, and a variant with a 16.3 inch barrel and a folding stock. Because of Yugoslavia's mechanised infantry, the variant with the 20 inch barrel was impractical and did not prove popular, so it was discarded early on. The other two variants were produced in greater numbers and received the designation M64A (for the fixed stock) and M64B (for the folding stock), respectively.

In 1970, the Yugoslav government approved the M64A for serial production as the AP M70 (Automatska Puška Model 1970, "Automatic Rifle Model 1970"), with a few alterations to the original design. To reduce production costs and ensure that the rifles could use standard AK magazines, the M64's bolt hold open device was removed. Instead, Zastava manufactured proprietary magazines for the M70 which fulfilled the same function. The magazines' follower plates had flat rear edges which held back the bolt after the last round was fired. A derivative of the M64B with a folding stock was also produced, under the designation M70A. The M70 became a standard infantry weapon in the Yugoslav People's Army that year. Shortly afterwards, Zastava ceased threading the barrels of M70s into their receivers and adopted the cheaper and easier method of pressing and pinning barrels into the receivers. The M70s produced with pressed and pinned barrels, along with other detail improvements, were redesignated M70B, with the folding stock variant being redesignated M70 AB. Because these simplified milled receivers did not have the bolt hold-open lever, they were flat on the left side, similar to a Type 3 milled AK receiver, however Zastava did not machine a lightening cut on the left side.

By the mid 1970s, Zastava began manufacturing the M70 with a stamped rather than a milled receiver to reduce production costs. This was known as the M70B1. Derivatives of the M70B1 with folding stocks were designated M70AB2. Both the M70B1 and M70AB2 were fitted with night sights, which alternatively utilized tritium vials or were marked with luminescent paint, that could be raised or lowered as needed. Small numbers of M70B1s and M70AB2s were manufactured with mounting brackets for optics, these were designated M70B1N and M70AB2N, respectively. The M70B2 received a new stamped receiver, thicker and heavier than those found on comparable stamped receiver Kalashnikov rifles, such as the AKM. The M70B2 and most later models of the M70AB2 were also manufactured with sturdier barrel trunnions resembling those on the RPK light machine gun. The rifles now possessed distinct bulges on either side of their forward receivers, necessary to accommodate the larger RPK-pattern trunnions. The addition of the larger trunnions and thicker receivers was seen as a necessary measure to strengthen the rifle design and make it more suitable for launching grenades. The M70AB3 and M70B3 were the last non-carbine M70 rifles produced by Zastava.

== Features ==
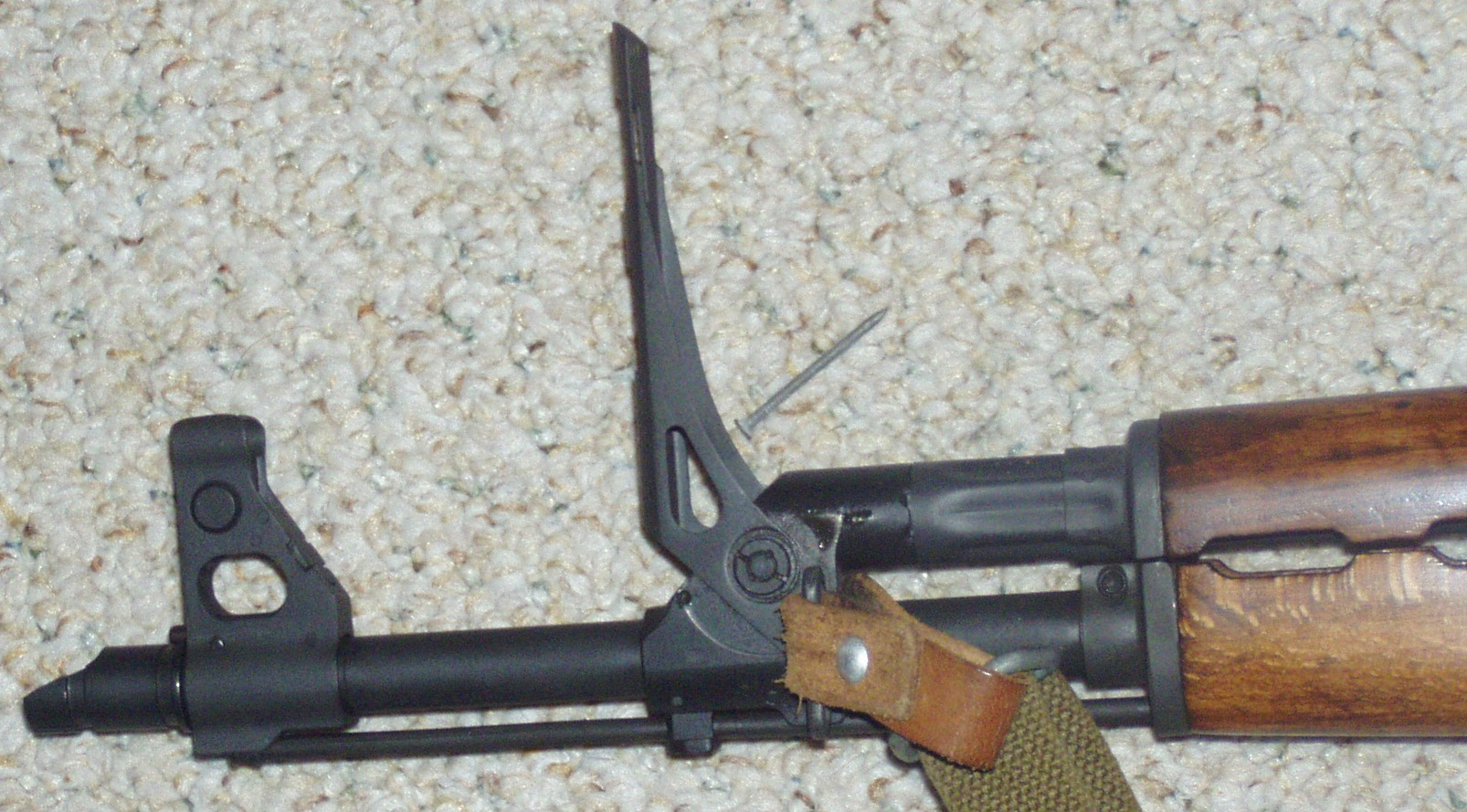
Zastava M70 rifle with grenade sights raised

The original M70 design was based on the early pattern Soviet AK-47 (specifically Type 3), which utilised a milled receiver. There are a number of cosmetic differences between the two receiver patterns, namely the smooth left side of the receiver, which lacks the machined section normally found on original Soviet Type 3 AKs and their derivatives. The M64/M70 dust covers were secured into place by a unique locking recoil spring guide, which prevents it from being dislodged while firing rifle grenades. Additionally, Zastava serial numbers were engraved just above the magazine well on milled receiver M64s and M70s rather than on the trunnion. Even after Zastava began producing the M70 with a stamped receiver, many of the weapon's features more closely resembled those of the Type 3 AK rather than the stamped receiver AKM.

Zastava began incorporating larger, RPK-pattern barrel trunnions in the M70 during the mid to late 1970s, which resulted in a distinctive bulge on the forward receiver beneath the rifle's bolt handle. Each M70B1 was marked on the left above the bulged trunnion with the Zastava brandmark, model number, year of production, and a serial number. There are three fire selector markings on the right side of the receiver: "U" ("Ukočeno", safety), "R" ("Rafalna", automatic fire), and "J" ("Jedinačna", semi-automatic fire).

The M70 included an integral folding ladder sight and a detachable grenade launcher spigot for launching rifle grenades. The sight is normally locked into a folded position atop the rifle's upper handguard. Prior to firing a rifle grenade, the sight is raised and locked in the vertical position, which closes off the gas port in the barrel and prevents the M70's action from being cycled while a grenade is being launched. The M70 was designed to fire the M60 rifle grenade, with either a high-explosive or shaped charge warhead. The sight markings on the left side of the ladder sight are graduated for high-explosive or anti-personnel rounds, while those on the right are graduated for targeting armored vehicles and other hard targets.

The M70 was issued with a late pattern AKM bayonet, copied from the original Soviet product, with a leather scabbard hanger. It was also issued with a unique Yugoslavian canvas sling, which was secured to the rifle by a flat steel hook. The hook design required a much broader sling swivel to be attached to the M70's gas block than was usual to other Kalashnikov rifles.

== Variants ==
=== Yugoslavia/Serbia ===
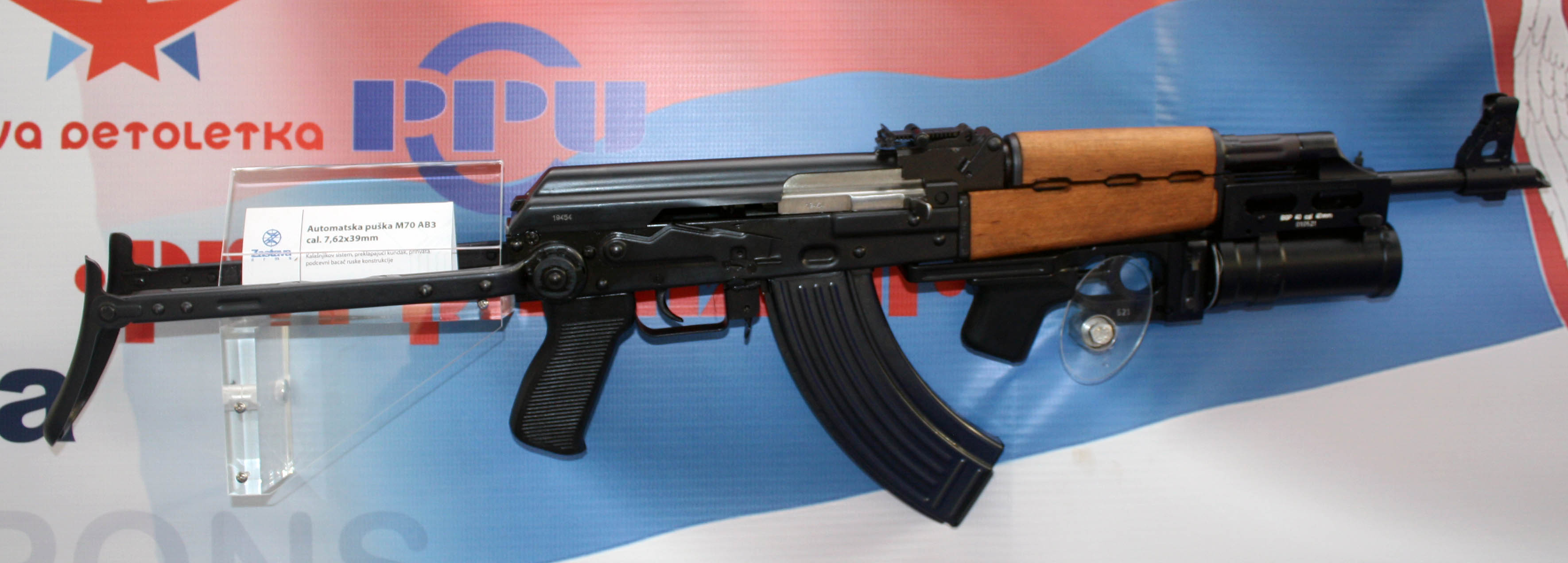
Zastava M70AB3

- M64 – first production model. Rear sight moved further back than on the AK-47, 20 inch barrel, prototype milled receiver with "scalloped" cuts on the left side to accommodate bolt hold-open device, screw-in barrel, internal bolt hold-open, stock tangs and fixed wood stock
- M64A – same as M64, but with a 16-inch barrel
- M64B – same as M64A, but with an underfolding stamped steel stock
- M70 – same as M64A, but officially adopted by the JNA and given the designation "M70"
- M70A – underfolding variant of M70, identical to the AP M64B, but with a different designation
- M70B – same as the M70, but with an improved "slabside" milled receiver with no cuts on the left side, a press-in barrel, no bolt-hold open, and no stock tangs
- M70AB – same receiver and barrel as the M70B but with the underfolding stock from the M70A
- M70B1 – stamped 1.6mm receiver, bulged RPK-style front trunnion, press-in barrel, fixed stock
- M70AB2 – same as the M70B1 but with an underfolding stock
- M70B1N – stamped receiver, fixed stock, mount for night or optical sights
- M70AB2N – stamped receiver, underfolding stock, mount for night or optical sights
- M70AB3 – stamped receiver, underfolding stock, rifle grenade sight removed and replaced with a BGP 40 mm underslung grenade launcher
- M70B3 – stamped receiver, fixed stock, rifle grenade sight removed and replaced with a BGP 40 mm underslung grenade launcher
- M92 – carbine, the shorter variant of the M70AB2
- PAP M70 – semi-automatic variant intended for the civilian market

=== Iraq ===
- Tabuk - Iraqi copy. Bore and chamber are not chrome plated.
- Tabuk Carbine - Iraqi carbine variant with underfolding stock
- Tabuk Sniper Rifle – Iraqi long barrel stamped receiver and fixed stock variant

== Users ==
=== Current ===
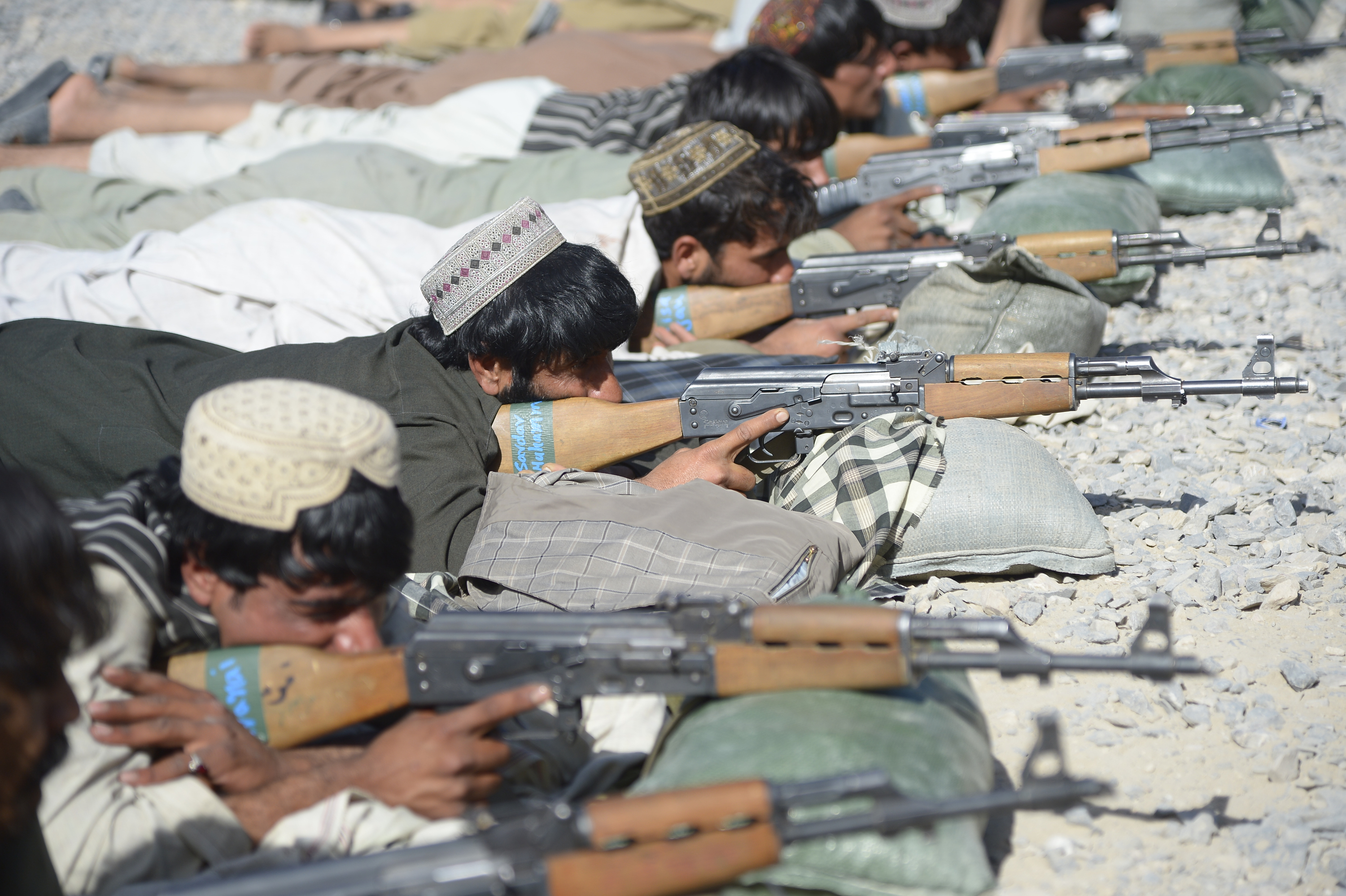
Afghan police recruits train on M70s in 2012

- Afghanistan: Received as military aid from the United States. Several were captured by the Taliban in 2021.
- Angola
- Bosnia and Herzegovina
- Burkina Faso: used by the Burkinabe contingent of the United Nations Multidimensional Integrated Stabilization Mission in Mali.
- Cyprus
- Iran: Some captured from Iraq and re-issued during the Iran–Iraq War.
- Iraq
- Jordan
- Lebanon
- Liberia
- Libya
- Mali: 1,000 rifles donated by Croatia in 2013.
- Montenegro: Used by the Special Police Unit (PJP).
- North Macedonia
- Palestine: Used by the PLO and later by the Palestinian National Authority.
- Rwanda
- Slovenia
- South Sudan
- Ukraine: Donated by Croatia in 2022.
- United Kingdom: Purchased a number of M70s for training of Ukrainian soldiers.

=== Former ===
- Croatia (stored in reserve).
- Serbia (stored in reserve).
- Republika Srpska
- Serbia and Montenegro, inherited from Yugoslav stocks.
- Yugoslavia
- Zaire: Used by the White Legion.

=== Non-state users ===
- Hamas
- Islamic State
- Palestinian Islamic Jihad
- UNITA

== See also ==
- Zastava M21
- Zastava M90
- List of assault rifles

== Sources ==
- Nurkić, Fadil (2005). Oružje bosanskog otpora. Slovo.
- "Пешадијско наоружање: Аутоматска пушка 7,62 mm М70" [Infantry weapons: Automatic Rifle 7.62 mm M70]. Serbian Army. Archived from the original on March 25, 2016.
- Rottman, Gordon (May 24, 2011). The AK-47: Kalashnikov-series assault rifles. Osprey Publishing. ISBN 978-1-84908-835-0.
