= Radivoje Milojković =

Serbian politician

- Радивоје Милојковић
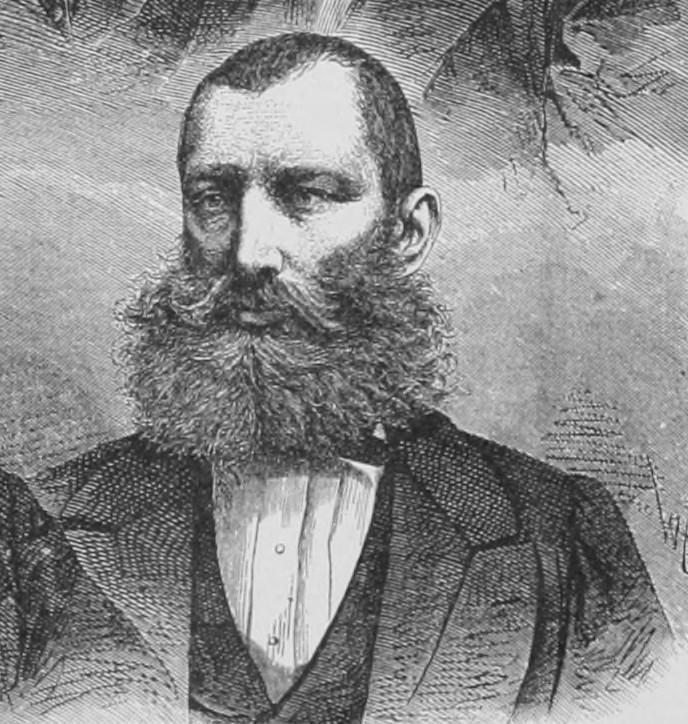
- Portrait of Radivoje Milojković

President of the Ministry of Serbia
- In office 8 August 1869 – 22 August 1872
- Monarch: Milan I
- Preceded by: Đorđe Cenić
- Succeeded by: Milivoje Blaznavac

Minister of Internal Affairs
- In office 13 June 1887 – 31 December 1887
- Preceded by: Milutin Garašanin
- Succeeded by: Svetozar Milosavljević
- In office 17 June 1880 – 2 November 1880
- Preceded by: Jakov Tucaković
- Succeeded by: Milutin Garašanin
- In office 6 May 1876 – 6 August 1879
- Preceded by: Ljubomir Kaljević
- Succeeded by: Jakov Tucaković
- In office 3 July 1868 – 31 August 1872
- Preceded by: Nikola Hristić
- Succeeded by: Marko Lazarević

Personal details
- Born: 9 January 1833 Glogovac, Principality of Serbia
- Died: 16 December 1888 (aged 55) Belgrade, Kingdom of Serbia
- Party: Liberal Party
- Education: Lyceum of the Principality of Serbia
- Alma mater: Heidelberg University

Radivoje Milojković (Serbian Cyrillic: Радивоје Милојковић; 9 January 1833 – 16 December 1888) was a Serbian politician. In the aftermath of Prince Mihailo's assassination in 1868, he served as Interior Minister under several Liberal governments of the 1870s and 1880s, as well as Prime Minister during the regency of Jovan Ristić, Milivoje Blaznavac and Jovan Gavrilović from 1869 to 1872. During this time, he was a close ally of Jovan Ristić.

Milojković's time as Interior Minister set the foundations of police work in Serbia. He was considered a highly effective if authoritarian minister who persecuted both supporters of the ousted Karađorđević dynasty, as well as early socialists and supporters of Svetozar Marković.

== Early life ==
Radivoje Milojković was born on the third day of Christmas, 9 January 1833 [O.S. 27 December 1832] in the village of Glogovac, Požarevac okrug (later renamed Kušiljevo). His father was Milojko Živanović, a local merchant, and his mother's name was Velika. Velika was Milojko's second marriage, and Radivoje was the oldest of six siblings.

Radivoje and his siblings gained their elementary education from a teacher their father brought to the village from Bela Crkva. In 1841, he went to Smederevo to study the first two years of Gymnasium. In 1844, Radivoje continued his studies in Belgrade where he studied the remainder of Gymnasium until 1847. There, he was classmates with Jovan Ristić and Tihomilj Nikolić.

== Education ==
In 1847, Milojković enrolled at the Lyceum of the Principality of Serbia where he studied philosophy for two years and the law for three. During his second year of philosophy, he joined the newly created Association of Serbian Youth. He was elected president of the Association in 1851, shortly before the group was banned because of its criticism of the Defenders of the Constitution. Milojković and a group of friends were temporarily expelled from the Lyceum for refusing to abide by the ban. He was re-enrolled at the school with the help of economics professor Kosta Cukić, and graduated in 1852.

After completing the Lyceum, Milojković became a legal intern in the Belgrade District Court. He served there from August 1852 to November 1853, when he became a junior court clerk in Požarevac. Milojković left his position in September 1855, when he was awarded state scholarship and went on to study law at Heidelberg University for three years. After graduating in 1858, Milojković was granted a scholarship for an additional year during which he fulfilled his dream of visiting Paris with a friend from the university. While in France, he met with the philosopher Étienne Vacherot and attended lectures which he personally found interesting.

== Political career ==
Milojković joined the civil service in 1859 as secretary at the Ministry of Justice. Soon after, he became junior secretary at the State Council and, after the return to power of Prince Mihailo Obrenović in 1860, Milojković became head secretary at the Ministry of Justice. In 1863, he became Head of the Department at the ministry, where he served until 1865. In June 1865, Milojković became President of the Appellate Court.

As president of the Appellate Court, Milojković was given the task of writing a new constitution by Prince Mihailo in June 1867. His plan for the new constitution was to hand over more power to the National Assembly, which would consist of two houses. The upper house would contain the local bishops, members of the State Council and members appointed personally by the Prince. The Prince could propose laws, which could be overruled with a two-thirds majority. Milojković's reforms were opposed, primarily by Prime Minister Nikola Hristić, as too radical.

After the assassination of Prince Mihailo, Milojković became Minister of Internal Affairs in July 1868. He served in the cabinet of Đorđe Cenić for one year, after which he also assumed the title of Prime Minister, a post he would hold until the end of the regency in 1872. As Interior Minister, Milojković co-headed the Nikoljski odbor, a committee for drafting the new constitution. As head of the committee, Milojković argued against and ultimately overruled Aćim Čumić's attempts to institute life mandates for the State Council, which he considered an attempt to create a new oligarchy in the vein of the Defenders of the Constitution regime. Milojković would successfully manipulate the State Council headed by Jovan Marinović to accept the new constitution in June 1869 with an ultimatum.

As Prime Minister and Interior Minister during the regency of Jovan Ristić, Milivoje Blaznavac and Jovan Gavrilović over the new Prince Milan who was underage, Milojković was one of Ristić's key allies. The two successfully cooperated to sideline Blaznavac's influence by utilizing the National Assembly's new powers. Under Milojković as minister, the regency period was marked by an increase in police brutality against opponents of the Obrenović dynasty, both supporters of the rival Karađorđević dynasty, as well as early socialists and supporters of Svetozar Marković. After the Prince became of age and Blaznavac, his first Prime Minister, suddenly died, Prince Milan turned to Ristić to form a new government but insisted against including Milojković as Interior Minister in Ristić's 1873 cabinet.

During the government of Jovan Marinović, Milojković was chosen as Vice President of the State Council in late 1873. Two other liberals were also made council members, as Marinović wished for his government to present a non-partisan politics. Still, many bureaucrats and police chiefs remained loyal to Milojković during Marinović's government and secretly remained in contact with him. Milojković was finally removed from the position of Vice President by the government of Danilo Stefanović in 1875.

Milojković again served as Interior Minister in the liberal governments of Stevča Mihailović in 1875 and 1876. With the excuse of the Serbian–Ottoman Wars, Milojković showed more of his authoritarian tendencies, clashing with the opposition in a much more brutal way. He continued to serve as Interior Minister during the second cabinet of Jovan Ristić between 1878 and 1879, and in 1880.

In the aftermath of Ilka's assassination attempt in 1882, and taking into account Milojković's experience with police work, King Milan proposed that Milojković lead a new government, with the caveat that the Progressives Milutin Garašanin and Čedomilj Mijatović serve as interior and foreign ministers respectively, and that the Liberals accept Milan's preferred pro-Austrian foreign policy. Under the influence of Ristić, Milojković ultimately declined this offer.

== Final years and death ==
In June 1887, Milojković again became Interior Minister in the Liberal-Radical coalition government. The next year, he became a member of the Constitutional Committee, created to draft the next constitution. However, in November 1888, Milojković fell ill and died on 16 December 1888. He was buried in the Belgrade New Cemetery on 18 December.

== Personal life ==
In 1861, Radivoje married Mileva, the daughter of Hadži Toma, a wealthy Belgrade merchant. Jovan Ristić was Mileva's brother-in-law. The two men used these family connections, engaging in nepotism, and came to be known as the Hadžitomić political dynasty.

Mileva and Radivoje had a son and daughter.

Government offices
Preceded by Đorđe Cenić	Prime Minister of Serbia; 1869-1872	Succeeded by Milivoje Petrović Blaznavac
Preceded by Nikola Hristić; Ljubomir Kaljević; Jakov Tucaković; Milutin Garašanin	Minister of the Interior of Serbia; 1869-1872; 1876-1879; 1880; 1887	Succeeded by Marko Lazarević; Jakov Tucaković; Milutin Garašanin; Svetozar Milosavljević
