= Cabinet of Jovan Marinović =

- 24th Cabinet of Principality of Serbia
- 1873–1874
- Coat of arms of Principality of Serbia
- Date formed: November 3, 1873
- Date dissolved: December 7, 1874

People and organisations
- Head of state: Milan Obrenović IV
- Head of government: Jovan Marinović

History
- Predecessor: Cabinet of Jovan Ristić II
- Successor: Cabinet of Aćim Čumić

By administrative fiat, the Marinović cabinet established freedom of speech and the press, which was an important step in establishing parliamentary democracy. At the session of the Serbian Parliament held on November 27, 1873, the Marinović government presented a set of far-reaching reform laws, including the law on the subsidization of industrial enterprises and the law of six days of land ploughing (“day” meaning a Serbian land measurement equivalent to 5,760 m^{2}), as a minimal privately owned landed property protected from being sold or repossessed due to debts. This allowed Serbian peasants who were small landowners, at the time often victims of property loss due to predatory lending, to have at least 8.6 acres (35,000 m^{2}) of land (out of the total land which they owned) they could always count on as remaining in their possession. On December 23, 1873, his government instituted the law by which corporal punishment was abolished and the prison system reformed. Other reforms regarding secondary school and Great School were passed as well.

The Marinović government introduced the metric system into Serbia as well as a native silver currency. After losing the majority among Liberal deputies in Parliament in 1874, the Marinović cabinet became the first Serbian government to be toppled in the National Assembly, and called for new elections. After being defeated at the parliamentary elections in October 1874, Marinović resigned, and the new Cabinet of Aćim Čumić was established on December 7, 1874.

== Cabinet members ==
Position	Portfolio	Name	Image	In Office
Prime Minister	General Affairs	Jovan Marinović		3 November 1873 - 7 December 1874
Minister	Foreign Affairs	Jovan Marinović		3 November 1873 - 7 December 1874
Minister	Internal Affairs	Aćim Čumić		3 November 1873 - 7 December 1874
Minister	Justice	Đorđe Cenić		3 November 1873 - 7 December 1874
Minister	Finance	Čedomilj Mijatović		3 November 1873 - 7 December 1874
Minister	Education and Church Affairs	Filip Hristić		3 November 1873 - 7 December 1874
Minister	Army	Kosta Protić		3 November 1873 - 7 December 1874
Minister	Construction	Kosta Magazinović		3 November 1873 - 6 June 1874
Minister	Construction	Ljubomir Ivanović		6 June 1874 - 7 December 1874

== See also ==
- Principality of Serbia
- Jovan Marinović

The Marinović government introduced the metric system into Serbia as well as a native silver currency.
