= Conservative Party (Kingdom of Serbia) =

Conservative political party in the Kingdom of Serbia

Conservative Party Конзервативна странка
- Leaders: Ilija Garašanin; Nikola Hristić
- Founders: Ilija Garašanin; Toma Vučić Perišić
- Founded: 1858
- Dissolved: 1895
- Preceded by: Defenders of the Constitution
- Succeeded by: Progressive Party
- Headquarters: Belgrade
- Newspaper: Vidovdan
- Ideology: Conservatism; Serbian nationalism; Constitutionalism
- Political position: Right-wing

The Conservative Party (Serbian: Конзервативна странка), also known as the Conservatives (Serbian: Конзервативци), was a political organization in the Principality of Serbia.

During its existence, it did not operate as a political party, but rather as a political organization, since the official registration of political parties was introduced by law in 1881. Its most prominent members were Ilija Garašanin, Toma Vučić Perišić, Jovan Marinović and Nikola Hristić. Their political opponents were the liberals.

== History ==
=== Foundation and early parliamentary period ===
The Conservatives were initially formed during the Saint Andrew's Day Assembly (Serbian Cyrillic: Светоандрејска скупштина) as a Political faction that opposed ideas that were promoted by the liberals, including political reforms. Ilija Garašanin, a prominent member of the defenders of the Constitution group, called for Aleksandar Karađorđević to adopt a law regarding the formation of the National Assembly which was supported by a majority of members of the State Council. The parliament was then formed, and it was mostly controlled by the Conservatives, which were led by Garašanin and Toma Vučić Perišić, and were supported by businessman Miša Anastasijević, who was elected as the first president of the National Assembly.

Garašanin and Anastasijević opposed changes that were institutionalized by Jevrem Grujić, a liberal secretary. After long negotiations between the two groups, a law passed which abolished the possibility of the National Assembly to influence the budget and that the National Assembly could only return laws for amendments, which made the parliament mostly an advisory body. The Conservatives soon after proposed an act for the resignation of Aleksandar Karađorđević and for the establishment of a vicarage (Serbian Cyrillic: намесништво). The parliament later dismissed Karađorđević and appointed Miloš Obrenović as prince, although the vicarage only lasted until the return of Prince Miloš to Serbia. Conservatives sought to exploit the vote and called for the military to dismiss the parliament, which failed and the Conservatives had to accept the return of Prince Miloš to Serbia, whom they supported until his death in 1860.

The Conservatives, with the support of Prince Miloš, enacted the Law on National Assembly in practice in January 1859, which was met with fierce opposition from the liberals. Due to these changes, Prince Miloš decided to dissolve the assembly and formed a proposal for a new assembly that convened in August 1859. This time, the Conservatives sat in the opposition, although only until September, when Prince Miloš decided to dissolve the parliament and annul the mandates for liberal politicians after the 1859 election.

=== Opposition and decline ===
Following the assassination of Mihailo Obrenović, a temporary vicarage was set up by Milan Petronijević which consisted of Conservatives Jovan Marinović and Garašanin. The vicarage was shortly lasted due to the coup d'état that was soon carried out by Milivoje Blaznavac, which brought underage Milan I to power. A regency, that lasted until 1872, was set up by Blaznavac which forced the Conservatives into the opposition, due to the liberals being brought to power. Numerous members left the Conservatives and joined the liberals and the Young Conservatives (Serbian Cyrillic: Младоконзервативци). Danilo Stefanović, a member of the Conservatives, was chosen as the president of the ministry after Aćim Čumić's resignation in 1875. Stefanović ruled as a "technocrat" and avoided to solve major political issues. Shortly before the 1875 parliamentary election, Stefanović jailed liberals and opposition MPs, although in the end, liberals ended up winning the election and Stefanović left the office in August 1875. The Conservatives de facto ceased to exist in 1881, following the registration of the conservative-liberal Serbian Progressive Party as a political party.

== Conservative Prime Ministers ==
Prime Minister of Serbia	Years
Ilija Garašanin	1861–1867
Nikola Hristić	1867–1868; 1883–1884; 1888–1889; 1894–1895
Đorđe Cenić	1868–1869
Danilo Stefanović	1875
