= 1874 Serbian parliamentary election =

Parliamentary elections were held in Serbia on 24 October 1874 after the National Assembly elected in 1871 completed its three-year term. A total of 97 members were elected, with a further 33 appointed by Prince Milan.

== Results ==
The elections resulted in a majority of seats being won by the opposition liberals.

== Aftermath ==
The newly elected Assembly convened for the first time on 8 November. Đorđe Topuzović became president of the National Assembly while Jevrem Grujić became vice-president.

The Assembly was officially opened with a speech from Milan on 10 November. However, the debate that followed the speech led to the resignation of Prime Minister Jovan Marinović after it became apparent his conservative government did not have enough support in parliament. This was the first time that a government had been brought down by the National Assembly. Three days later Milan appointed Aćim Čumić as Prime Minister, but on 26 November the Assembly was adjourned until 14 January 1875. In January another government was formed, this time led by Danilo Stefanović, but it was also received poorly by parliament. As a result, the National Assembly was dissolved on 13 March and fresh elections called. A decree by Milan on 20 July 1875 set the election date as 3 August.
