= 1875 Serbian parliamentary election =

Snap parliamentary elections were held in Serbia on 3 August 1875 following the early dissolution of the National Assembly elected the previous year.

== Background ==
Triannual parliamentary elections had taken place as scheduled on 24 October 1874, resulting in a majority for liberals. The newly elected Assembly convened for the first time on 8 November, and was officially opened with a speech from Prince Milan on 10 November. However, the debate that followed the speech led to the resignation of Prime Minister Jovan Marinović after it became apparent his conservative government did not have enough support in parliament. This was the first time that a government had been brought down by the National Assembly. Three days later Milan appointed Aćim Čumić as Prime Minister, but on 26 November the Assembly was adjourned until 14 January 1875. In January another government was formed, this time led by Danilo Stefanović, but it was also received poorly by parliament. As a result, the National Assembly was dissolved on 13 March and fresh elections called. A decree by Milan on 20 July 1875 set the election date as 3 August.

== Results ==
The elections resulted in a large majority for the liberals. As a result, Stefanović resigned the day after the elections.

== Aftermath ==
Ljubomir Kaljević became president of the National Assembly while Ilija Stojanović, Uroš Knežević and Pantelia Srećković were elected as its vice-presidents. A new government was formed on 27 August, led by Stevča Mihailović.
