= Milivoje Blaznavac =

Serbian soldier and politician

Milivoje Petrović Blaznavac Миливоје Петровић Блазнавац
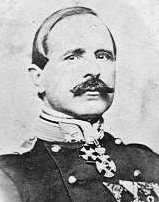

President of the Ministry of Serbia
- In office 22 August 1872 – 5 April 1873
- Monarch: Milan I
- Preceded by: Radivoje Milojković
- Succeeded by: Jovan Ristić

Minister of War
- In office 10 August 1872 – 23 March 1873
- Prime Minister: Radivoje Milojković; Himself
- Preceded by: Jovan Belimarković
- Succeeded by: Jovan Belimarković
- In office 2 April 1865 – 21 June 1868
- Prime Minister: Ilija Garašanin; Jovan Ristić; Nikola Hristić
- Preceded by: Hippolyte Mondain
- Succeeded by: Jovan Belimarković

Personal details
- Born: 16 May 1824 Blaznava, Principality of Serbia
- Died: 5 April 1873 (aged 48) Belgrade, Principality of Serbia
- Spouse: Katarina Konstantinović (m. 1868)
- Children: 2
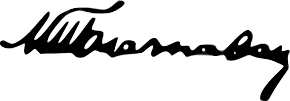
- Signature

Milivoje Petrović Blaznavac (Serbian Cyrillic: Миливоје Петровић Блазнавац; 16 May 1824 – 5 April 1873) was a Serbian general and politician who served as regent from 1868 to 1872, as well as head of government from 1872 to 1873.

Initially a police officer under the leadership of local governor Jovan Obrenović, he began his political career in 1842 during the rebellion led by Toma Vučić Perišić. Between 1842 and 1855, Blaznavac served as a confidant of Stevan Knićanin in multiple capacities, during which time he climbed the ranks of the army. He would continue his ascent with the help of Ilija Garašanin after Knićanin's death in 1855.

Having played a key role in proclaiming the underage Prince Milan Obrenović prince after the assassination of Prince Mihailo in 1868, Blaznavac became part of the prince's three-man regency. His heavy-handed approach to politics led to Blaznavac being outmaneuvered by another member of the regency, the moderate liberal Jovan Ristić, and his staunchly pro-Austrian foreign policy was somewhat curbed as a result.

After Prince Milan came of age in August 1872, Blaznavac shortly served as head of government before his sudden death in April 1873.

== Early life ==
Milivoje Petrović Blaznavac was born on 16 May 1824 in Blaznava. His father, Petar, was a rural merchant and shopkeeper, and his mother served in the residence of Prince Miloš Obrenović. At the time, a rumor circulated that he was an illegitimate son of the prince, who married off one of his concubines to a struggling village storekeeper with a generous dowry after she became pregnant. Blaznavac used this rumor to his advantage, however its veracity is unknown.

Blaznavac finished elementary school in his native village of Blaznava, after which he learned the dyer's trade. Rather than staying in the trade for long, he soon joined the standing army, from which he transferred to the police force. There, he served under the command of Jovan Obrenović, governor of the Rudnik district.

== Service under Prince Alexander ==
During Vučić's Rebellion in 1842, Blaznavac sided with Toma Vučić Perišić against the Obrenović dynasty. He intercepted and destroyed a written order sent out from Belgrade to the governors of the districts of Čačak and Užice to come to the aid of Prince Mihailo. Having learned of this, Jovan Obrenović sentenced Blaznavac to 50 strokes of the cane.

After Vučić's victory, Blaznavac was awarded a transfer to Belgrade where he started to work for the Ministry of Internal Affairs. He stayed in police work until 1845, leaving from the position of secretary of the command. Blaznavac transferred to the army and in 1848, he became adjutant to Prince Alexander Karađorđević. During this time, Blaznavac was a confidant of Stevan Knićanin, who was in charge of the security of Prince Alexander.

After a falling out with the prince for personal reasons, Blaznavac remained loyal to Knićanin. He was dispatched to Vienna to follow the deposed Prince Miloš Obrenović. He gained the prince's trust and reported on his plans to take advantage of the revolutions of 1848 to cross into Serbia and stage a coup. Blaznavac lured the prince to Zagreb, and with the help of Ljudevit Gaj, arranged his arrest under the pretense of him being a Hungarian agent. Unaware of their betrayal, the prince handed a large sum of money to the two, leaving him in a precarious position. He learned of Blaznavac's role in his arrest after his release and the two never reconciled.

In 1848, Blazanavac arrived in the newly proclaimed Serbian Vojvodina where he fought in the Serbian volunteer squads commanded by Stevan Knićanin. There, he served as Knićanin's adjutant and participated in several battles. After his return to Serbia, Blaznavac decided to pursue formal education. He studied chemistry in Vienna and Paris, after which he spent some time at the military academy in Metz. Despite never having graduated, he received an award for his research from Ferdinand II of the Two Sicilies. During the Crimean War, Blaznavac took part in several diplomatic missions in Vienna, meeting with ministers Buol and Bach, as well as Russian ambassador Alexander Gorchakov.

In late 1854, Stevan Knićanin became Interior Minister and made Blaznavac commander of the military department, putting him in charge of military affairs in Serbia. Knićanin died soon after, leaving Blaznavac in search of new patrons. He gained the trust of Ilija Garašanin and started using the power struggle between Garašanin and Prince Alexander to his advantage. He communicated with several foreign consulates, including both the Austrians who were supportive of the prince, as well as the Russians and French who were opposed to him. During the mission of Ibrahim Edhem Pasha in Belgrade in 1858, Blaznavac crucially sided with the prince. In 1858, he was promoted to the rank of colonel, at the time the highest title in the Serbian army.

== Service under Prince Mihailo ==
When the Assembly voted Prince Miloš Obrenović back into power in 1858, Blaznavac was in favor of staging a coup to protect the Karađorđević dynasty. However, Ilija Garašanin hesitated, and soon after Blaznavac was arrested and expelled to his native village of Blaznava and deprived of all titles. From there, he wrote to the governor of the Belgrade fortress Sherif Topal Osman Pasha in 1859 detailing his plans on how the Porte could depose the Obrenović dynasty and restore Serbia as a loyal province of the Ottoman Empire.

After Prince Miloš's death in 1860, Blaznavac returned to public life and was installed as the steward of the smelter in Kragujevac. Still, knowing of his message to Osman Pasha, Prince Mihailo hesitated to allow Blaznavac to take up a higher post. It was then that Blaznavac befriended Anka Konstantinović, the prince's first cousin with whose daughter the prince became infatuated. Together, Ilija Garašanin and Anka Konstantinović successfully lobbied for Blaznavac to be named Minister of War in April 1865.

Prince Mihailo's plans to marry Katarina Konstantinović, his first cousin once removed, soon turned into a public scandal. Blaznavac exploited the power struggle that emerged between her mother Anka and Ilija Garašanin, relaying information from both sides as a double agent, as well as to the prince himself. Blaznavac had in fact himself proposed to Katarina not long before the prince had done so, in the hopes of marrying into the royal family. Crucially, he revealed Garašanin's final plan of legal action against the prince's marriage and took Anka's side in the hopes of staying in power due to her influence on the prince, especially since his work in the ministry was evaluated negatively by a Russian commission in 1867.

== Regent of Prince Milan ==
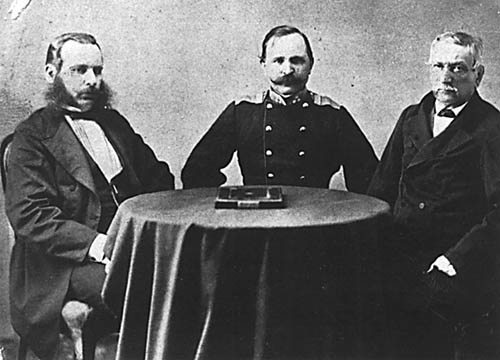
Blaznavac with the remaining two regents Jovan Ristić and Jovan Gavrilović

After the assassination of Prince Mihailo on 29 May 1868, the government planned that the Grand National Assembly should elect a new ruler. However, Blaznavac staged a coup d'état with the help of the Belgrade garrison and proclaimed Milan Obrenović, the fourteen-year-old grandson of Prince Miloš's brother Jevrem, the new prince.

As Milan was a minor, Blaznavac served as his regent together with Jovan Gavrilović and the moderately liberal Jovan Ristić. Taking advantage of the regency, Ristić promulgated a new constitution in 1869 which gave greater power to the National Assembly. This way, he outmaneuvered Blaznavac and minimized the influence of the officer corps who were loyal to him. Ristić was also successful in curbing Blaznavac's staunchly pro-Austrian foreign policy and creating deeper ties to Russia, with the goal of balancing between the two.

== Premiership and death ==
After Prince Milan came of age in 1872, he was unhappy with Ristić for his role in promulgating the new constitution. He made Blaznavac the first-ever General in the Serbian army, as well as his Prime Minister in late 1872, which however turned out to be short-lived.

Blaznavac died suddenly of a heart attack on 5 April 1873. However, Slobodan Jovanović records his cause of death as Ludwig's angina, a curable condition which was probably left untreated by his insufficiently educated doctor. He was buried in the family tomb of Jevrem Obrenović in Rakovica.

== Personal life ==
Blaznavac was married to Katarina Konstantinović, former fiancée of Prince Mihailo Obrenović. Blaznavac was a suitor for Katarina's hand even before Prince Mihailo began to show an interest in her. The two had a son named Vojislav Blaznavac, a cavalry Colonel.

== In popular culture ==
In Svetozar Marković, a 1980 feature film and 1981 miniseries directed by Eduard Galić depicting the life of early Serbian socialist thinker Svetozar Marković, Blaznavac is portrayed by Dušan Janićijević.

In Because My Thoughts Are Struggling (2023), a historical drama film directed by Milorad Milinković, Blaznavac is portrayed by Nebojša Dugalić.

== See also ==
- List of prime ministers of Serbia

Government offices
Preceded by Radivoje Milojković	Prime Minister of Serbia; 1872–1873	Succeeded by Jovan Ristić
Preceded by Hippolyte Mondain	Minister of Defence; 1865–1868	Succeeded by Jovan Belimarković
Preceded by Jovan Belimarković	Minister of Defence; 1872–1873	Succeeded by Jovan Belimarković
