= Svetomir Nikolajević =

Serbian writer, politician, scholar and Nobel Peace Prize candidate

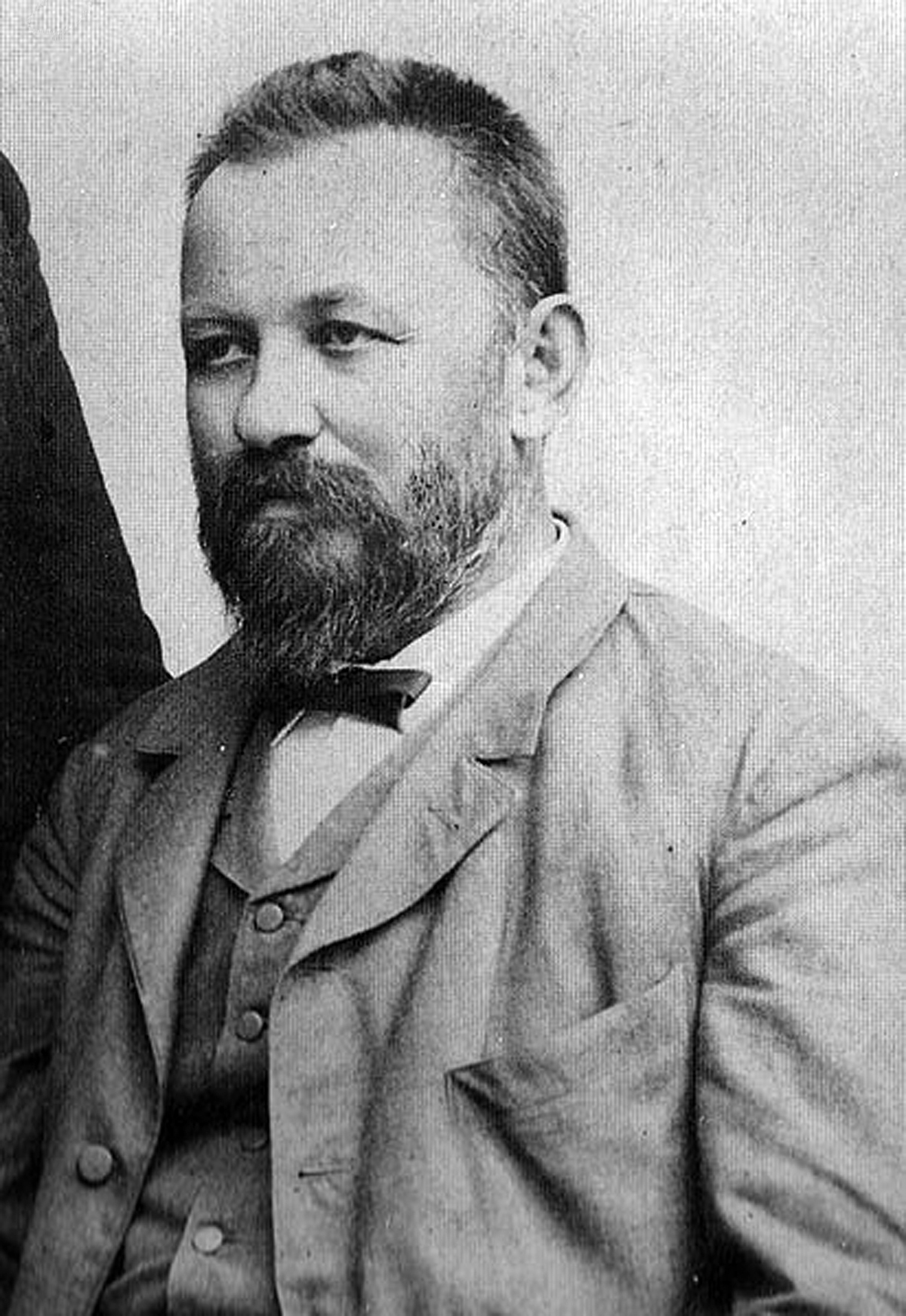
Svetomir Nikolajević

Svetomir Nikolajević (Raduša, September 21, 1844 – Belgrade, April 18, 1922) was a Serbian writer, politician, scholar and Nobel Peace Prize candidate.

== Biography ==
Nikolajević was born in Raduša near Ub, Serbia. Nikolajević was a professor at the Belgrade Velika škola, in the department of history of literature with a focus on the literature of the Slavs and Serbs. He was also a member of the Serbian Royal Academy and a Nominee for the Nobel Peace Prize in 1915.

Nikolajević taught comparative literature at the University of Belgrade, introducing sections on Shakespeare and Byron in his lectures. According to him, Shakespeare was a poet to whom psychological truth was the most important goal of dramatic art.

Nikolajević served as the Prime Minister of Serbia from April 3 to 27 October 1894, as the Mayor of Belgrade and as the Minister of Internal Affairs. He was one of the founders of the People's Radical Party and the Society of Saint Sava. He was also one of the founders the Masonic lodge "Pobratim". Nikolajević was an early member of the Serbian Red Cross, founded by Vladan Đorđević during the Serbian-Ottoman War (1876–1877).

In politics, Svetomir Nikolajević insisted that preparations for an agreement for a Macedonian settlement should continue in case the Prime Minister Ilija Garašanin was compelled to resign. Following the disappointing turn of events in 1885 (Serbo-Bulgarian War), the Serbian policy toward Macedonia acquired new momentum in 1886, with the establishment of the Society of Saint Sava. Elected as its president, was Svetomir Nikolajević, the founder of the society, who was known for his moderate views of Greek claims in Macedonia. Nikolajević was the first Serbian historian to write about Rigas Feraios.

By the early twentieth century, the first professor of the newly established Department of World Literature in the Belgrade School of Philosophy was Svetomir Nikolajević, later Professor in the School of Philology at the University of Belgrade.

In his Listići iz književnosti (Leaves from Literature), published in two volumes (Belgrade, 1883 and 1888), Nikolajević rendered great services to the study of foreign writers and poets such as Tacitus, Shakespeare, Ludovico Ariosto, Montesquieu, Byron, Luis de Camões and Torquato Tasso. That work was continued by Marko Car when Nikoajević entered politics.

He died in Belgrade.

== See also ==
- List of prime ministers of Serbia

Government offices
Preceded by Đorđe Simić	Prime Minister of Serbia; 1894	Succeeded by Nikola Hristić
Preceded by Svetozar Milosavljević	Minister of Internal Affairs; 1894	Succeeded by Nikola Hristić
