= Ministry of Internal Affairs (Serbia) =

Government ministry of Serbia

- Министарство унутрашњих послова Ministarstvo unutrašnjih poslova
- Emblem of the Ministry of Internal Affairs

Ministry overview
- Formed: 1811; 215 years ago (current form since 1991)
- Jurisdiction: Government of Serbia
- Headquarters: Palace of Serbia, Bulevar Mihajla Pupina 2, Belgrade
- Minister responsible: Ivica Dačić
- Website: mup.gov.rs

The Ministry of Internal Affairs (Serbian: Mинистарство унутрашњих послова, МУП, romanised: Ministarstvo unutrašnjih poslova, MUP), is a ministry in the Government of Serbia which is responsible for civilian police service, civil defense, and administering data and personal documents of citizens (passports, identity cards, driving licenses, etc). The current minister is Ivica Dačić, in office since 2 May 2024.

== Organization ==
The Ministry of Internal Affairs has a total of 42,817 employees, of whom 28,266 are uniformed personnel of Police of Serbia.

The ministry is organized as follows:

- Secretariat–General
- Police Directorate
  - Coordination Directorate for Kosovo and Metohija
- Directorate for Emergency Situations
- Directorate for Internal Control
- Directorate for Logistics
- Directorate for Information and Communication Technology

== List of ministers ==
This list includes ministers of internal affairs of the Revolutionary Serbia, the Principality of Serbia, and the Kingdom of Serbia from the creation of this post in 1811 to the formation of Yugoslavia after World War I in 1918. The list also includes ministers of internal affairs of the People's Republic of Serbia / Socialist Republic of Serbia from 1945 to 1991, as well as the Republic of Serbia from 1991 to the present day.

=== Revolutionary Serbia ===
Minister	Took office	Left office	Grand Vožd
Jakov Nenadović; Јаков Ненадовић (1765–1836)	1811	1812	Karađorđe

=== Principality of Serbia ===
Conservative Party Liberal Party Serbian Progressive Party Non-party

Minister	Took office	Left office	Prince
Đorđe Protić; Ђорђе Протић (1793–1857)	23 April 1834	15 February 1835	Miloš Obrenović
Dimitrije Davidović; Димитрије Давидовић (1789–1858)	15 February 1835	28 March 1835	Miloš Obrenović
Đorđe Protić; Ђорђе Протић (1793–1857)	28 March 1835	16 May 1840	Miloš Obrenović
Đorđe Protić; Ђорђе Протић (1793–1857)	28 March 1835	16 May 1840	Mihailo Obrenović
Cvetko Rajović; Цветко Рајовић (1793–1873)	16 May 1840	8 September 1842	Mihailo Obrenović
Toma Vučić Perišić; Тома Вучић Перишић (1788–1859)	8 September 1842	20 June 1843	Alexander Karađorđević
Ilija Garašanin; Илија Гарашанин (1800–1872)	20 June 1843	22 April 1852	Alexander Karađorđević
Aleksandar Nenadović; Александар Ненадовић (1815–1881)	22 April 1852	6 October 1852	Alexander Karađorđević
Aleksa Simić; Алекса Симић (1800–1872)	6 October 1852	26 March 1853	Alexander Karađorđević
Aleksandar Nenadović; Александар Ненадовић (1815–1881)	26 March 1853	26 December 1854	Alexander Karađorđević
Stevan Knićanin; Стеван Книћанин (1807–1855)	26 December 1854	1 January 1855	Alexander Karađorđević
Stevan Magazinović; Стеван Магазиновић (1806–1869)	1 January 1855	28 December 1855	Alexander Karađorđević
Radovan Damnjanović; Радован Дамњановић (1811–1858)	28 December 1855	28 September 1856	Alexander Karađorđević
Konstantin Nikolajević; Константин Николајевић (1821–1877)	28 September 1856	12 April 1858	Alexander Karađorđević
Ilija Garašanin; Илија Гарашанин (1812–1874)	12 April 1858	19 January 1859	Miloš Obrenović
Stojan Jovanović Lešjanin; Стојан Јовановић Лешјанин	19 January 1859	11 February 1859	Miloš Obrenović
Milivoje Jovanović; Миливоје Јовановић	11 February 1859	4 July 1859	Miloš Obrenović
Jevrem Grujić; Јеврем Грујић (1804–1864)	4 July 1859	4 August 1859	Miloš Obrenović
Vladislav Vujović; Владислав Вујовић	4 August 1859	21 February 1860	Miloš Obrenović
Đorđe Milovanović; Ђорђе Миловановић (1813–1855)	6 April 1859	27 October 1860	Miloš Obrenović
Nikola Hristić; Никола Христић (1818–1911)	8 November 1860	3 July 1868	Mihailo Obrenović
Radivoje Milojković; Радивоје Милојковић (1832–1888)	3 July 1868	31 August 1872	Milan Obrenović
Marko Lazarević; Марко Лазаревић	3 July 1872	14 April 1873	Milan Obrenović
Jakov Tucaković; Јаков Туцаковић (1828–1889)	14 April 1872	3 November 1873	Milan Obrenović
Aćim Čumić; Аћим Чумић (1836–1901)	3 November 1873	3 February 1875	Milan Obrenović
Jevrem Grujić; Јеврем Грујић (1827–1895)	3 February 1875	8 October 1875	Milan Obrenović
Ljubomir Kaljević; Љубомир Каљевић (1841–1907)	8 October 1875	6 May 1876	Milan Obrenović
Radivoje Milojković; Радивоје Милојковић (1832–1888)	6 May 1876	6 August 1879	Milan Obrenović
Jakov Tucaković; Јаков Туцаковић (1828–1889)	6 August 1879	17 June 1880	Milan Obrenović
Radivoje Milojković; Радивоје Милојковић (1832–1888)	17 June 1868	2 November 1880	Milan Obrenović
Milutin Garašanin; Милутин Гарашанин (1843–1898)	2 November 1880	6 March 1882	Milan Obrenović

=== Kingdom of Serbia ===
Liberal Party Serbian Progressive Party People's Radical Party Independent Radical Party Non-party

Minister	Took office	Left office	King
Milutin Garašanin; Милутин Гарашанин (1843–1898)	6 March 1882	3 October 1883	Milan I
Nikola Hristić; Никола Христић (1818–1911)	3 October 1883	19 February 1884	Milan I
Stojan Novaković; Стојан Новаковић (1842–1915)	19 February 1884	14 May 1885	Milan I
Dimitrije Marinković; Димитрије Маринковић (1835–1911)	14 May 1885	4 April 1886	Milan I
Milutin Garašanin; Милутин Гарашанин (1843–1898)	4 April 1886	13 June 1887	Milan I
Radivoje Milojković; Радивоје Милојковић (1832–1888)	13 June 1887	31 December 1887	Milan I
Svetozar Milosavljević; Светозар Милосављевић (1845–1921)	31 December 1887	26 April 1888	Milan I
Nikola Hristić; Никола Христић (1818–1911)	26 April 1888	6 March 1889	Milan I
Kosta Taušanović; Коста Таушановић (1854–1902)	6 March 1889	13 May 1890	Alexander I
Jovan Đaja; Јован Ђаја (1846–1928)	13 May 1890	28 January 1891	Alexander I
Mihailo Kr. Đorđević; Михаило Кр. Ђорђевић (1850–1901)	28 January 1891	2 February 1891	Alexander I
Svetozar Milosavljević; Светозар Милосављевић (1845–1921)	2 February 1891	23 February 1891	Alexander I
Jovan Đaja; Јован Ђаја (1846–1928)	23 February 1891	2 April 1892	Alexander I
Svetozar Milosavljević; Светозар Милосављевић (1845–1921)	2 April 1892	21 August 1892	Alexander I
Stojan Ribarac; Стојан Рибарац (1855–1922)	21 August 1892	13 April 1893	Alexander I
Svetozar Milosavljević; Светозар Милосављевић (1845–1921)	13 April 1893	24 January 1894	Alexander I
Svetomir Nikolajević; Светомир Николајевић (1844–1922)	24 January 1894	27 October 1894	Alexander I
Nikola Hristić; Никола Христић (1818–1911)	27 October 1894	7 July 1895	Alexander I
Dimitrije Marinković; Димитрије Маринковић (1835–1911)	7 July 1895	29 December 1896	Alexander I
Mihailo Kr. Đorđević; Михаило Кр. Ђорђевић (1850–1901)	29 December 1896	23 October 1897	Alexander I
Jevrem Andonović; Јеврем Андоновић (1842–1910	23 October 1897	11 August 1899	Alexander I
Đorđe Genčić; Ђорђе Генчић (1861–1938)	11 April 1899	25 July 1900	Alexander I
Lazar Popović; Лазар Поповић	25 July 1900	18 February 1901	Alexander I
Nikola Jovanović; Никола Јовановић	18 February 1901	20 October 1902	Alexander I
Velimir Todorović; Велимир Тодоровић (1848–1920)	20 October 1902	11 June 1903	Alexander I
Stojan Protić; Стојан Протић (1857–1923)	11 June 1903	29 May 1905	Peter I
Ljubomir Stojanović; Љубомир Стојановић (1860–1930)	29 May 1905	12 August 1905	Peter I
Ivo Pavićević; Иво Павићевић (1869–1926)	12 August 1905	30 April 1906	Peter I
Stojan Protić; Стојан Протић (1857–1923)	30 April 1906	12 June 1907	Peter I
Nastas Petrović; Настас Петровић (1867–1933)	12 June 1907	12 April 1908	Peter I
Marko Trifković; Марко Трифковић (1864–1928)	12 April 1908	20 July 1908	Peter I
Svetozar Milosavljević; Светозар Милосављевић (1845–1921)	20 July 1908	29 June 1909	Peter I
Ljubomir Jovanović; Љубомир Јовановић (1865–1928)	29 June 1909	25 September 1910	Peter I
Stojan Protić; Стојан Протић (1857–1923)	25 September 1910	7 July 1911	Peter I
Marko Trifković; Марко Трифковић (1864–1928)	7 July 1911	12 September 1912	Peter I
Stojan Protić; Стојан Протић (1857–1923)	12 September 1912	5 December 1914	Peter I
Ljubomir Jovanović; Љубомир Јовановић (1865–1928)	5 December 1914	16 November 1918	Peter I
Marko Trifković; Марко Трифковић (1864–1928)	16 November 1918	1 December 1918	Peter I

=== People's Republic of Serbia / Socialist Republic of Serbia ===
Political Party: League of Communists of Serbia

No.	Portrait	Minister	Took office	Left office	Time in office	Party	Cabinet
People's Republic of Serbia
1	Slobodan Penezić	Slobodan Penezić (1918–1964)	22 November 1946	16 December 1953	7 years, 24 days	SKS	Nešković; Stambolić
2	Vojin Lukić	Vojin Lukić (1919–1997)	16 December 1953	9 June 1962	8 years, 175 days	SKS	Veselinov; Minić
3	Vladan Bojanić	Vladan Bojanić (1919–2003)	1962	1963	1 year	SKS	Penezić
Socialist Republic of Serbia
4	Milisav Lukić	Milisav Lukić (born 1922)	1963	1965	2 years	SKS	Stambolić; Stamenković
5	Slavko Zečević	Slavko Zečević (1921–1998)	1966	1976	10 years	SKS	Stamenković; Jojkić; Bojanić; Čkrebić
6	Viobran Stanojević	Viobran Stanojević (1929–2015)	26 October 1976	5 May 1982	5 years, 191 days	SKS	Čkrebić; Stambolić
7	Svetomir Lalović	Svetomir Lalović (1934–1992)	5 May 1982	5 December 1989	7 years, 214 days	SKS	Čkrebić; Jevtić
8	Radmilo Bogdanović	Radmilo Bogdanović (1934–2014)	5 December 1989	11 February 1991	1 year, 68 days	SKS	Radmilović

=== Republic of Serbia ===
Political Party: SPS DOS SPO ND / LS DSS SNS PS

No.	Portrait	Minister	Took office	Left office	Time in office	Party	Cabinet
1	Radmilo Bogdanović	Radmilo Bogdanović (1934–2014)	11 February 1991	30 May 1991	108 days	SPS	Zelenović
2	Zoran Sokolović	Zoran Sokolović (1938–2001)	30 May 1991	20 March 1997	5 years, 294 days	SPS	Zelenović; Božović; Šainović; Marjanović I
–	Radovan Stojičić	Radovan Stojičić (1951–1997); Acting	20 March 1997	11 April 1997 †	22 days	SPS	Marjanović I
–	Vlastimir Đorđević	Vlastimir Đorđević (born 1948); Acting	11 April 1997	15 April 1997	4 days	SPS	Marjanović I
3	Vlajko Stojiljković	Vlajko Stojiljković (1937–2002)	15 April 1997	9 October 2000	3 years, 177 days	SPS	Marjanović I–II
–	Mirko Marjanović	Mirko Marjanović (1937–2006); Acting	11 October 2000	24 October 2000	13 days	SPS	Marjanović II
	Slobodan Tomović	Slobodan Tomović (born 1946); Co-Minister	24 October 2000	25 January 2001	93 days	SPS	Minić
	Božidar Prelević	Božidar Prelević (born 1959); Co-Minister	24 October 2000	25 January 2001	93 days	DOS	Minić
	Stevan Nikčević	Stevan Nikčević (born 1961); Co-Minister	24 October 2000	25 January 2001	93 days	SPO	Minić
4	Dušan Mihajlović	Dušan Mihajlović (born 1948)	25 January 2001	3 March 2004	3 years, 38 days	LS	Đinđić–Živković
5	Dragan Jočić	Dragan Jočić (born 1960)	3 March 2004	7 July 2008	4 years, 126 days	DSS	Koštunica I–II
6	Ivica Dačić	Ivica Dačić (born 1966)	7 July 2008	27 April 2014	5 years, 294 days	SPS	Cvetković; Dačić
7	Nebojša Stefanović	Nebojša Stefanović (born 1976)	27 April 2014	28 October 2020	6 years, 184 days	SNS	Vučić I–II; Brnabić
8	Aleksandar Vulin	Aleksandar Vulin (born 1972)	28 October 2020	26 October 2022	1 year, 363 days	PS	Brnabić II
9	Bratislav Gašić	Bratislav Gašić (born 1967)	26 October 2022	2 May 2024	1 year, 189 days	SNS	Brnabić III
(6)	Ivica Dačić	Ivica Dačić (born 1966)	2 May 2024	Incumbent	2 years, 99 days	SPS	Vučević; Macut

== See also ==
- Police of Serbia
