= Vehicle registration plates of Serbia =

- Serbian vehicle registration plate, as issued since 2011
- Country: Serbia
- Country code: SRB

Current series
- Size: 520 mm × 110 mm 20.5 in × 4.3 in
- Material: Aluminum
- Serial format: BG 123-AB; BG 1234-AB
- Colour (front): Black on white
- Colour (rear): Black on white
- Introduced: 2011

Vehicle registration plates of Serbia display black alphanumeric characters on a white background with blue field placed along the left side edge.

Issuance of current registration plates started on 1 January 2011 and they were used alongside the old ones during the transitional period until the end of 2011.

== Standard plates ==
The two-letter regional code is followed by three or four-digit numeric code separated by the Serbian cross shield and a Cyrillic letter combination for the region below, and then followed by a two-letter alpha code, separated by a hyphen.

A blue field is placed along the left side edge, as in European Union countries, bearing SRB (the ISO 3166-1 alpha-3 country code for Serbia).

Numeric code contains combination of three or four digits (0-9), while two letter alpha code is made of combination of letters using Serbian Latin alphabet, with addition of letter X (e.g., BG 123-AA or BG 1234-AA). Since 2017 plates with the special "hooked" letters of the Serbian latin alphabet (Ć, Č, Š, Ž, Đ) as well as letters Y and W are no longer issued.

The standard dimensions of a Serbian license plates are 520.5 × 112.9 mm.

== Special plates ==
There are numerous special license plates.

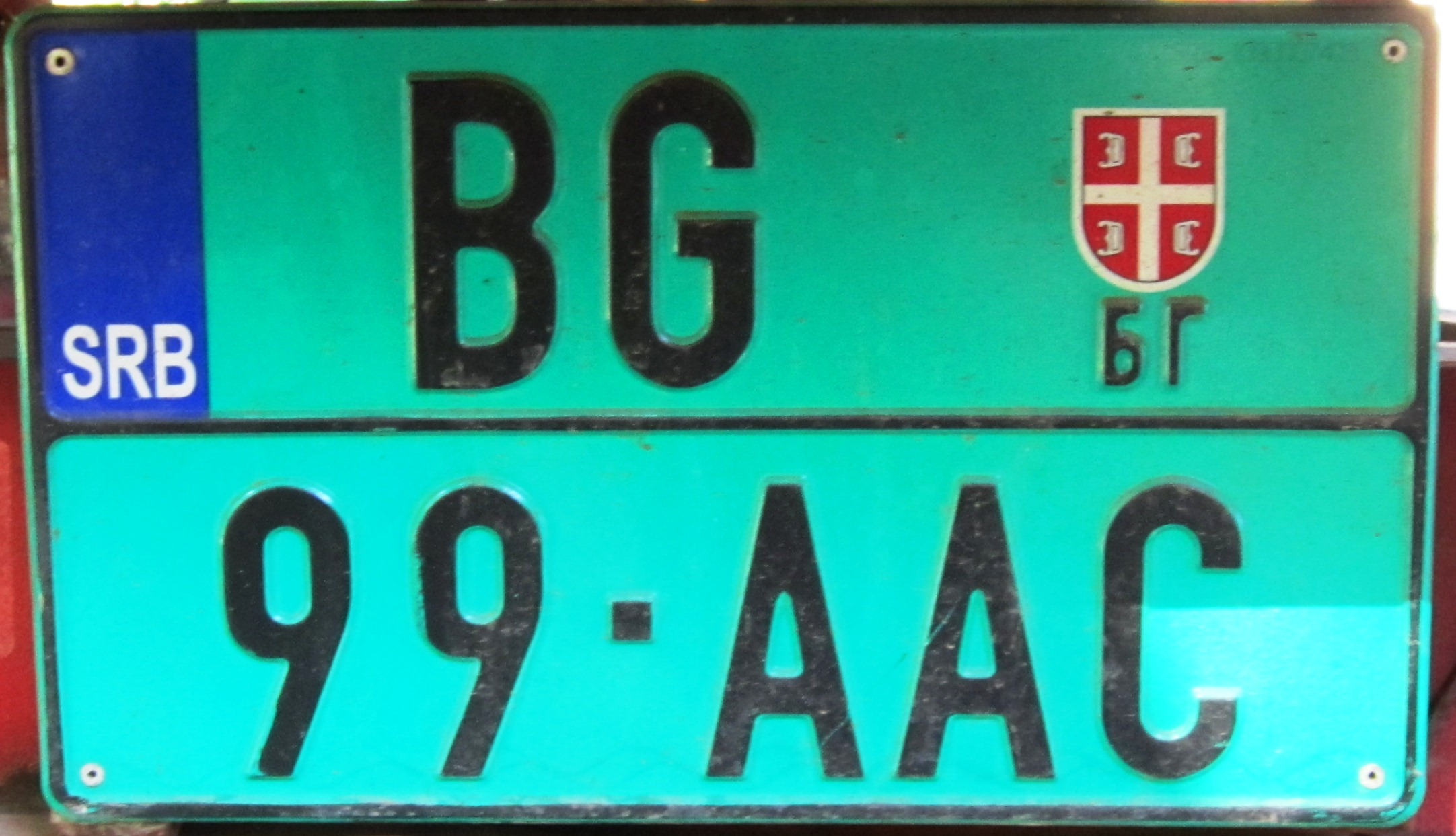
Agriculture trailer plate

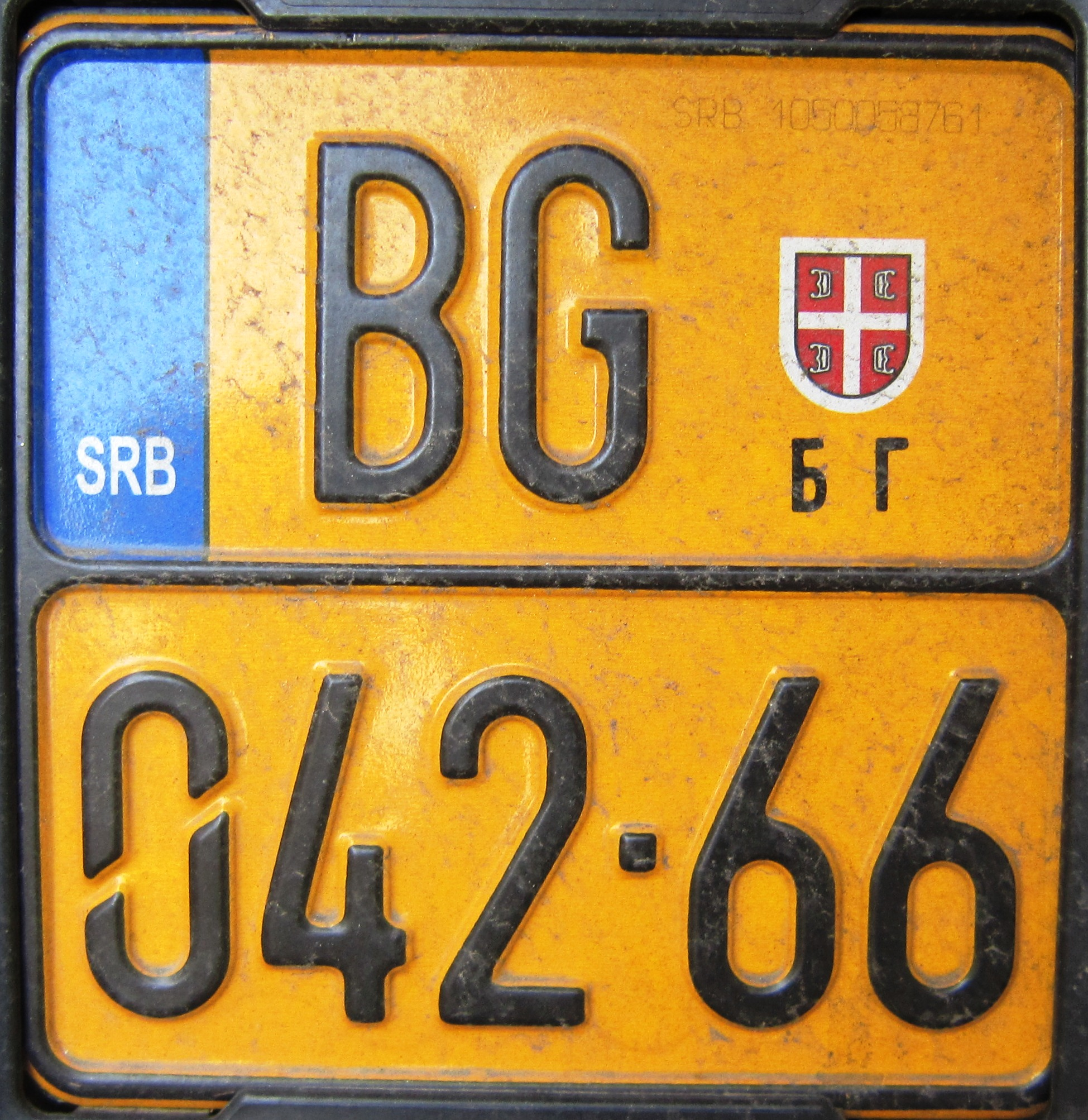
Moped plate

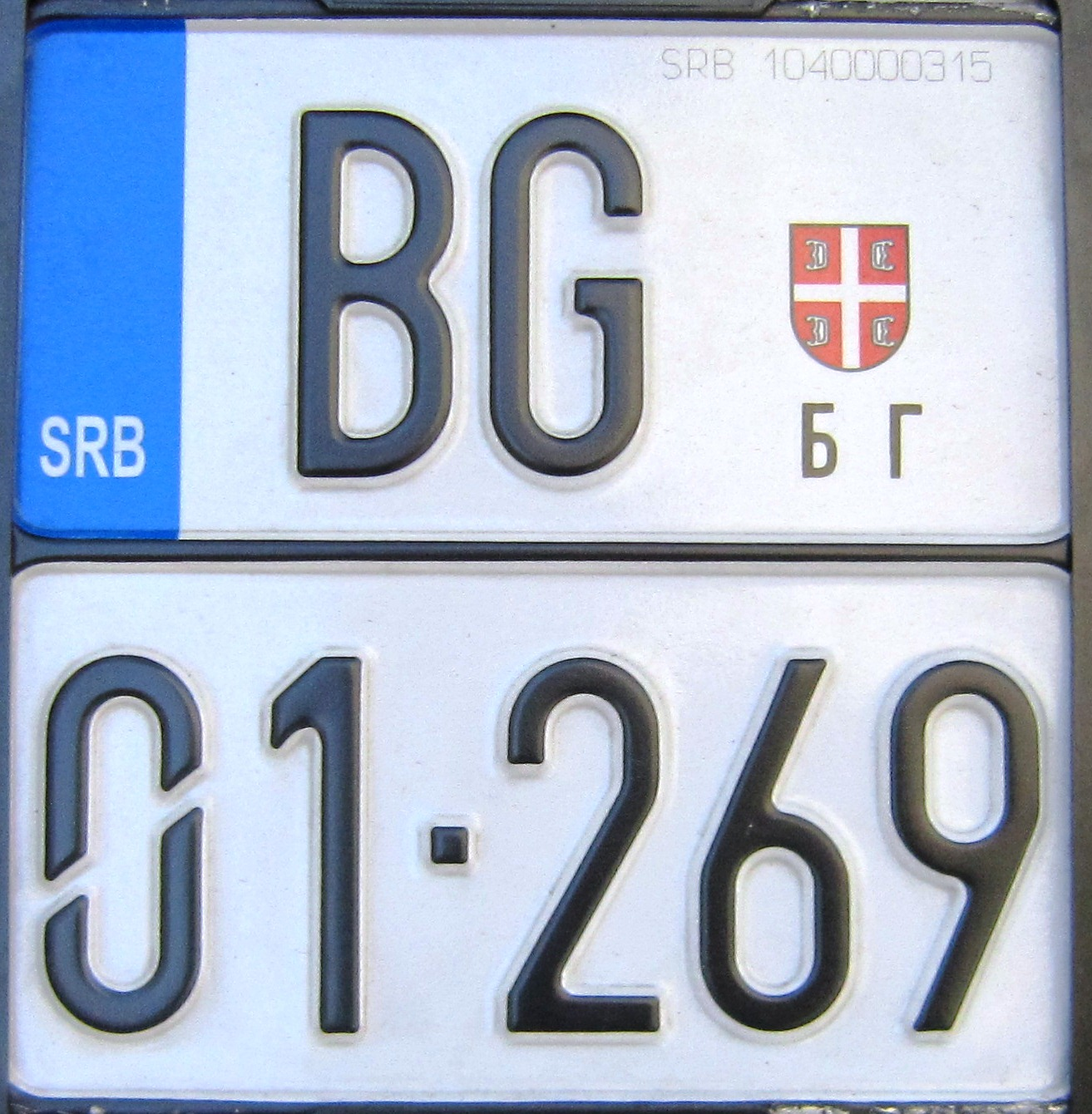
Motorcycle plate

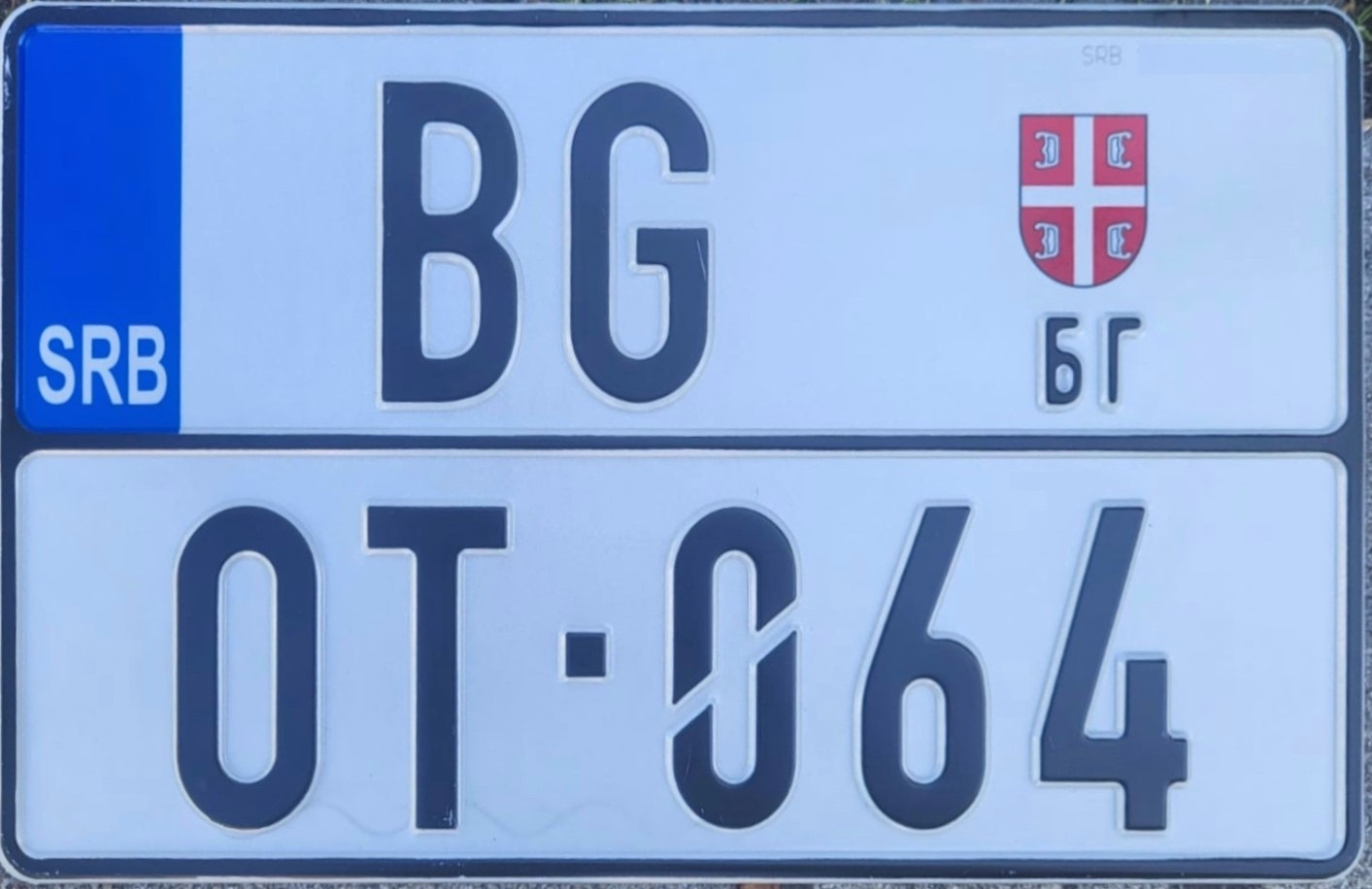
Historic vehicle plate

Taxi plate

Trailer plate

Police plate

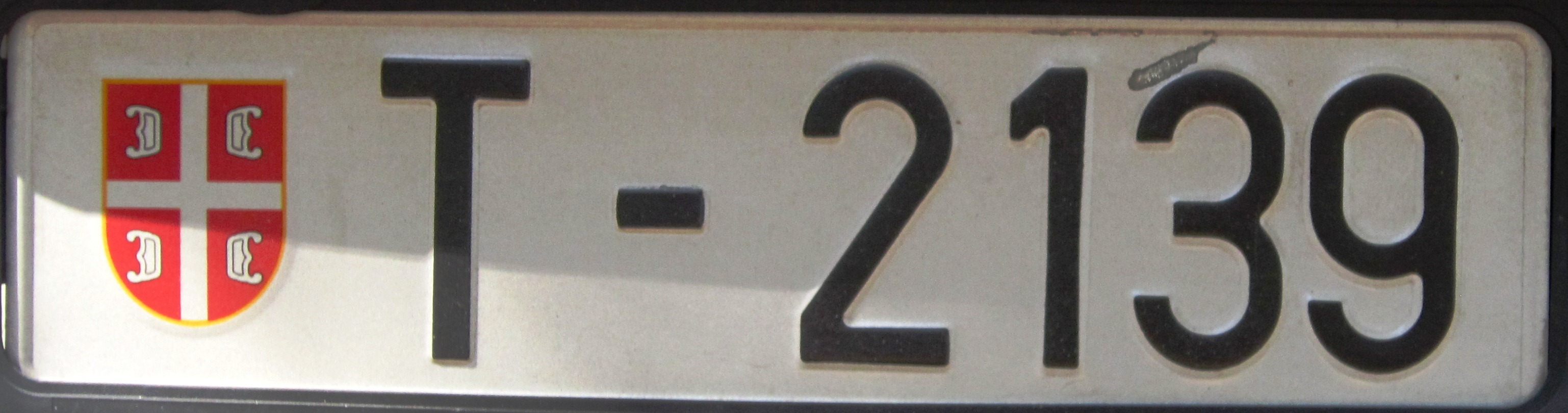
Military plate

Diplomatic plate

=== Agriculture vehicle plates ===
Agriculture plates consist of regional code and Serbian cross shield on upper side; and two numbers and three letters on lower side; both on green background.

=== Moped plates ===
Moped plates have two-letter regional code and Serbian cross shield on upper side; and two and three numbers on lower side; both on yellow background.

=== Motorcycle plates ===
Motorcycle plates have two-letter regional code and Serbian cross shield on upper side; and two and three numbers on lower side; both on white background.

=== Historic/classic vehicle plates ===
Historic or classic vehicle plates have two-letter regional code and Serbian cross shield on upper side; and OT ("old-timers") as serial letters and numbers on lower side; both on white background.

=== Taxi plates ===
Taxi plates have almost identical format of the civilian license plates with regional code first, Serbian cross shield, 5 numbers, and TX as serial letters.

=== Trailer plates ===
Trailer plates have a reversed format of the civilian license plates with serial letters first, Serbian cross shield, and then numbers and regional code.

=== Police plates ===
Police of Serbia plates have letter П (P in Cyrillic), Serbian cross shield, and then six numbers; on a blue background.

=== Military plates ===
Military plates have one letter, an emblem of Serbian Armed Forces (identical to Serbian cross shield), and then four numbers.

=== Diplomatic plates ===
Vehicles operated by foreign embassies, consulates, consular and diplomatic staff and various international organizations have been given plates with a distinguishing format of two (or three) numbers, one letter, three numbers (e.g., 12(3)-L-456). Vehicle owned by a diplomat or by accredited non-diplomatic staff carry a plate with characters printed in yellow on a black background while the vehicle owned by a foreign press agency, a foreign cultural representative or by an office of a foreign company and/or its staff, has plates with characters printed in black on a yellow background.

The first group of three numbers (123) identifies the country or organization to which the plate has been issued, the second group of three numbers (456) is a serial number. The letter in the middle (L) is denoting the status of the owner.

Additionally, plates have vertically orientated two-letter initials in small letters on the left side (after blue stripe) indicating the city in which they were issued (BG for Belgrade) and two numbers on the right side indicating the year for which they are valid (e.g., 12 for 2012).

Code	Explanation
A	vehicle owned by a diplomat - Ambassade
M	vehicle owned by accredited non-diplomatic staff - Mission
P	vehicle owned by a foreign press agency or a foreign cultural representative - Presse
CMD	additional oval plate for vehicles used by the chief of a diplomatic mission - Chef de Mission Diplomatique
CD	additional oval plate for vehicles used by a person with diplomatic status - Corps Diplomatique

Country	code	Country	code	Country	code
Russia	10	Guinea	51	ECPD	104
Ukraine	11	Pakistan	53	EAR	105
Poland	12	Sri Lanka	54	SEED	105
Hungary	14	Belarus	55	(Organization for Security and Co-operation in Europe) OSCE	111
Romania	15	Nigeria	62	ICRC	118
Bulgaria	16	Canada	63	IOM	119
Albania	17	Argentina	64	IFRC	120
Czech Republic	18	Brazil	65	United Nations	121
North Macedonia	19	Mexico	66	(United Nations) UNHCR	123
Israel	20	(United Nations) UNDP	70	EBRD	125
Angola	21	(United Nations) UNICEF	70	Council of Europe	127
Slovakia	22	Ecuador	71	IFC	128
Bosnia and Herzegovina	23	Cuba	72	World Bank	129
Croatia	24	Peru	76	Malaysia	137
Palestine	25	(United Nations) UNHCR	77	ICMP	138
Portugal	26	Australia	78	Montenegro	141
Cyprus	29	Libya	79	United States	144
United Kingdom	30	Algeria	80	Azerbaijan	150
South Korea	31	Egypt	81	United Nations	166
Finland	32	Zimbabwe	82		
Sweden	33	Iran	83		
Norway	34	India	84		
Denmark	35	Myanmar	85		
Netherlands	36	Japan	86		
Belgium	37	China	88		
Spain	38	Indonesia	89		
France	39	Syria	90		
Germany	40	Lebanon	91		
Italy	41	Tunisia	92		
Holy See	42	Morocco	93		
Switzerland	43	Ghana	94		
Austria	44	Iraq	98		
Greece	47	DR Congo	99		
Turkey	48	EU	101		
Slovenia	50	(United Nations) UNWFP	102		

== Regional codes ==
Following are the registration plate regional codes in Serbian Cyrillic alphabetical order:

Geographical distribution of regional codes

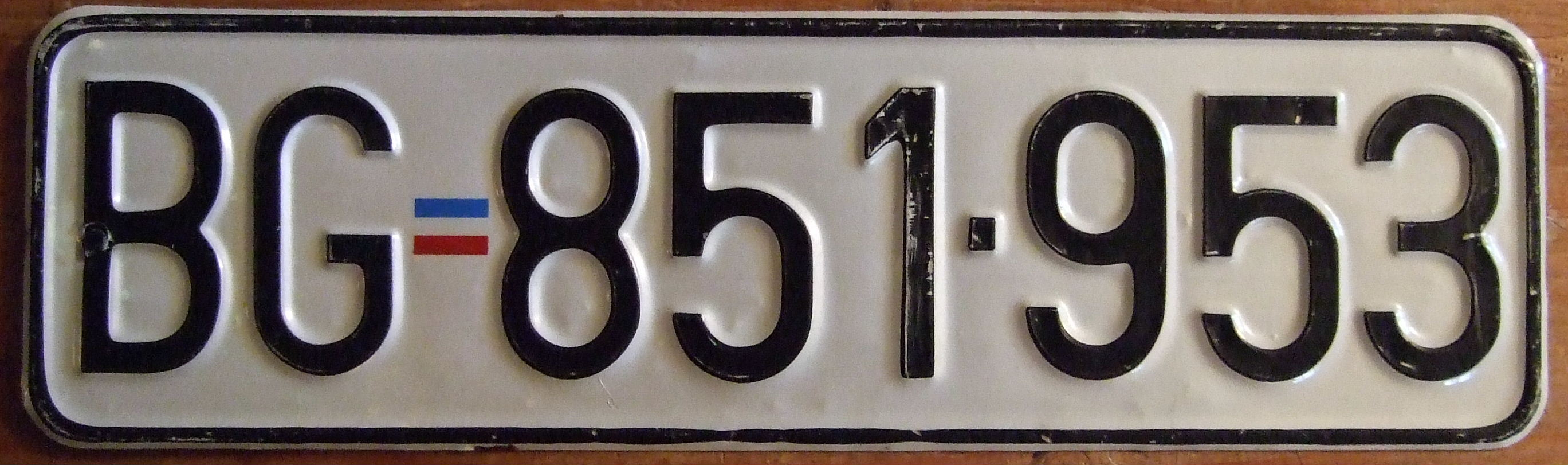
Old registration plate from Belgrade, issued until 2011.

Code		Region	Municipalities covered by the region
Lat.	Cyr.	Region	Municipalities covered by the region
AL	АЛ	ALeksinac	Aleksinac
AR	АР	ARanđelovac	Aranđelovac
AC	АЦ	AleksandrovaC	Aleksandrovac
BB	ББ	Bajina Bašta	Bajina Bašta
BG	БГ	BelGrade	Barajevo, Voždovac, Vračar, Grocka, Zvezdara, Zemun, Lazarevac, Mladenovac, Novi Beograd, Obrenovac, Palilula, Rakovica, Savski Venac, Sopot, Stari Grad, Surčin, Čukarica
BO	БО	BOr	Majdanpek, Bor
BP	БП	Bačka Palanka	Bačka Palanka
BT	БТ	Bačka Topola	Bačka Topola
BĆ	БЋ	BogatiĆ	Bogatić
BU	БУ	BUjanovac	Bujanovac
BČ	БЧ	BeČej	Bečej
VA	ВА	VAljevo	Lajkovac, Ljig, Mionica, Osečina, Valjevo
VB	ВБ	Vrnjačka Banja	Vrnjačka Banja
VL	ВЛ	VLasotince	Vlasotince
VP	ВП	Velika Plana	Velika Plana
VR	ВР	VRanje	Bosilegrad, Vladičin Han, Preševo, Trgovište, Vranje
VS	ВС	VrbaS	Vrbas
VŠ	ВШ	VrŠac	Bela Crkva, Plandište, Vršac
GM	ГМ	Gornji Milanovac	Gornji Milanovac
DE	ДЕ	DEspotovac	Despotovac
ZA	ЗА	ZAječar	Boljevac, Sokobanja, Zaječar
ZR	ЗР	ZRenjanin	Žitište, Novi Bečej, Nova Crnja, Sečanj, Zrenjanin
IN	ИН	INđija	Inđija
IC	ИЦ	IvanjiCa	Ivanjica
JA	ЈА	JAgodina	Rekovac, Jagodina
KA	КА	KAnjiža	Kanjiža
KC	КЦ	KoCeljeva	Koceljeva
KV	КВ	KraljeVo	Kraljevo
KG	КГ	KraGujevac	Batočina, Knić, Lapovo, Rača, City of Kragujevac
KŽ	КЖ	KnjaŽevac	Knjaževac
KI	КИ	KIkinda	Čoka, Novi Kneževac, Kikinda
KL	КЛ	KLadovo	Kladovo
KO	КО	KOvin	Kovin
KU	КУ	KUla	Kula
KŠ	КШ	KruŠevac	Brus, Varvarin, Ćićevac, Kruševac
LB	ЛБ	LeBane	Lebane
LE	ЛЕ	LEskovac	Bojnik, Medveđa, Crna Trava, Leskovac
LO	ЛО	LOznica	Krupanj, Ljubovija, Mali Zvornik, Loznica
LU	ЛУ	LUčani	Lučani
NV	НВ	Nova Varoš	Nova Varoš
NG	НГ	NeGotin	Negotin
NI	НИ	NIš	Doljevac, Gadžin Han, Merošina, Ražanj, Svrljig, City of Niš
NP	НП	Novi Pazar	Novi Pazar
NS	НС	Novi Sad	Bač, Bački Petrovac, Beočin, Žabalj, Srbobran, Sremski Karlovci, Temerin, Titel, City of Novi Sad
PA	ПА	PAnčevo	Alibunar, Kovačica, Opovo, Pančevo
PB	ПБ	PriBoj	Priboj
PŽ	ПЖ	PoŽega	Požega
PI	ПИ	PIrot	Babušnica, Bela Palanka, Dimitrovgrad, Pirot
PK	ПК	ProKuplje	Blace, Žitorađa, Kuršumlija, Prokuplje
PN	ПН	ParaćiN	Paraćin
PO	ПО	POžarevac	Veliko Gradište, Golubac, Žabari, Žagubica, Kučevo, Malo Crniće, Požarevac
PP	ПП	PrijePolje	Prijepolje
PT	ПТ	PeTrovac	Petrovac
RA	РА	RAška	Raška
RU	РУ	RUma	Irig, Pećinci, Ruma
SA	СА	SentA	Ada, Senta
SM	СМ	Sremska Mitrovica	Sremska Mitrovica
SV	СВ	SVilajnac	Svilajnac
SD	СД	SmeDerevo	Smederevo
SJ	СЈ	SJenica	Sjenica
SO	СО	SOmbor	Apatin, Odžaci, Sombor
SP	СП	Smederevska Palanka	Smederevska Palanka
ST	СТ	STara Pazova	Stara Pazova
SU	СУ	SUbotica	Mali Iđoš, Subotica
SC	СЦ	SurduliCa	Surdulica
TO	ТО	TOpola	Topola
TS	ТС	TrStenik	Trstenik
TT	ТТ	TuTin	Tutin
ĆU	ЋУ	ĆUprija	Ćuprija
UB	УБ	UB	Ub
UE	УЕ	UžicE	Arilje, Kosjerić, Čajetina, Zlatibor, Užice
ČA	ЧА	ČAčak	Čačak
ŠA	ША	ŠAbac	Vladimirci, Šabac
ŠI	ШИ	ŠId	Šid

== See also ==
- Driving licence in Serbia
- Country codes of Serbia
