= Driving licence in Serbia =

Document allowing one to drive a motorized vehicle in Serbia

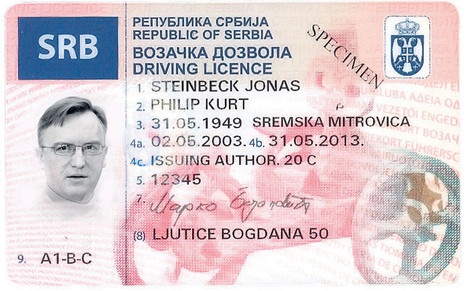
- The front of a contemporary Serbian driving licence
- Type: Driving licence
- Issued by: Serbia
- First issued: 2011
- Purpose: Proof of permission to legally operate a motor vehicle
- Valid in: Serbia
- Cost: 1,895 RSD/16€

In Serbia, the driving licence (Serbian: Возачка дозвола, romanized: Vozačka dozvola) is a type of licence granted by the state to citizens who request it, provided they satisfy certain requirements. The licence permits holders to drive motorised vehicles on public roads. The document is issued by the Serbian Police on behalf of the Ministry of Internal Affairs.

== Background ==
Until 2011, the Serbian driving licence had a pink booklet format, which was common in Europe at the time. A separate booklet was required for each vehicle category endorsement. Since then, Serbian driving licences are issued in an EU-standard, credit-card-style format. Only one card is required per licence holder as it contains information on all vehicle categories that the holder is allowed to operate.

The Serbian driving licence can be obtained after finishing a driving school and passing a two-stage test, the theory test and road test. A first aid course for drivers and a primary school diploma is also required to obtain valid driver's licence. A medical certificate is also necessary.

The minimum age to obtain a Serbian driving licence varies; for cars, it is 18 years, but the young drivers are only allowed to drive under a stricter regime until the age of 21; for some motorcycles it is 24, or 20 after two years of probation with another motorcycle licence. People can apply for a temporary driving licence at 16 for motorcycles under 125 cc although there are some regulations.

== See also ==
- Vehicle registration plates of Serbia
- Serbian identity card
- Serbian passport
