= Raduša (Ub) =

Raduša Радуша
- Village (Selo)
- Location within Serbia
- Coordinates: 44°25′N 19°52′E
- Country: Serbia
- District: Kolubara District
- Municipality: Ub

Area
  - Total: 8.06 km^{2} (3.11 sq mi)
- Elevation: 184 m (604 ft)

Population (2011)
  - Total: 251
  - Density: 31.1/km^{2} (80.7/sq mi)
- Time zone: UTC+1 (CET)
  - Summer (DST): UTC+2 (CEST)

Raduša is a village in the municipality of Ub, Serbia. According to the 2011 census, the village has a population of 251 people.
