= Jovan Gavrilović =

Serbian historian and politician

- Јован Гавриловић
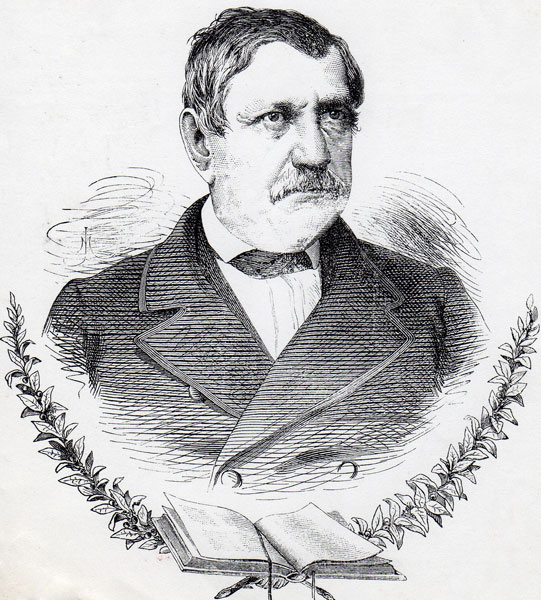
- Portrait of Gavrilović from 1878, by Josef Mukařovský
- Born: 3 November 1796; Vukovar, Habsburg monarchy
- Died: July 29, 1877 (aged 80); Belgrade, Principality of Serbia

Jovan Gavrilović (3 November 1796 – 29 July 1877) was a Serbian historian, politician, statesman, and public figure. He was the first president of the Serbian Learned Society, the forerunner of the Serbian Academy of Arts and Sciences. Gavrilović was also the benefactor of the teachers' association. During the fifty years of his life in Serbia's capital, he was a government official, diplomat, prince's deputy, a people's benefactor and more. A monument erected in his honor adorns Belgrade's Kalemegdan park.

== Biography ==
Gavrilović was born in 1796 into the family of a wealthy merchant Trivun Gavrilović in Vukovar, at the time in the Kingdom of Slavonia, Habsburg monarchy. In addition to material wealth, the Gavrilović family was also highly educated and Trivun Gavrilović boasted that he provided all of his children with a good education. Jovan started his education in Vukovar, and continued it at the Evangelical Lyceum in Bratislava, Pécs, Sremski Karlovci, Szeged, and Belgrade's Velika škola. He studied "law and state sciences" and was trained in jobs that he would deal with in different circumstances in the Principality of Serbia. These educational wanderings led him to master Latin, Slovak, Hungarian, Romanian, German, and French, languages that opened doors to the world of philosophy. He read Cicero, respected Voltaire, but he was under the influence of Kant. Considered a connoisseur of fine art, he was the most sought after groom of Vukovar and Srem, but he always fled into the world of books and correspondence with Serbian intellectuals of his time. Although his father's intention was to have him become the successor of the family trade business, Jovan devoted himself to the path of a "free scientist" in the search for the meaning of life.

== From Srem to Belgrade ==
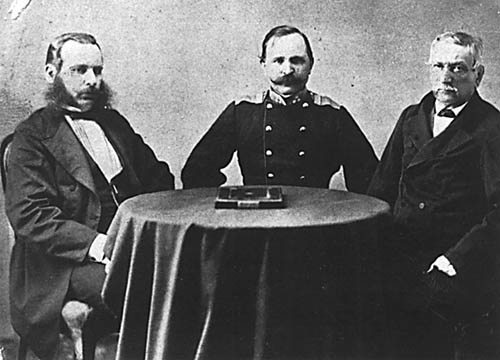
Gavrilović with the remaining two regents Jovan Ristić and Milivoje Blaznavac

Gavrilović also loved to travel, which led him to Belgrade in 1829. Belgrade at the time was a "mecca" for Serbian scholars who gladly came to Serbia, bringing the Age of Enlightenment to it. An additional impetus, was that Vuk Karadžić, a friend of Gavrilović, stayed with him in Belgrade during those years, with whom he collaborated over many years. He also collaborated with Felix Philipp Kanitz when he came to do research in 1858 in Serbia.

Unlike Vukovar, where he could not get a state job because of his civic background, Gavrilović was well received in Belgrade. Belgrade remained his home for the next five decades with three interruptions - during his short stay in Kragujevac, where he was deliberately deployed because he was known to dislike staying in smaller towns; then during his diplomatic service in Constantinople until 1833; and during his stay in Bucharest, in the same diplomatic capacity, in 1836.

Upon returning to Belgrade, Gavrilović became one of the most prominent figures and princes of trust. During the following decades, he was Minister of Finance, State Advisor, Head of the Business and Trade School and one of the founders and President of the Serbian Learned Society (later to become the Serbian Academy of Sciences and Arts). He wrote the Rečnik, Geografisko-Statistični Srbije (Geographical and Statistical Atlas of Serbia) in Belgrade in 1846.

On 10 June 1868 he became the head of state, sharing the three-person regency, with Milivoje Blaznavac and Jovan Ristić, which took care of the newly elected prince Milan Obrenović, without any compensation. This was his most difficult role, as the young Milan was sensitive and restless. In his attempts to please a young man who grew up in a conflict-ridden family, Gavrilović encountered many obstacles; from the staff of the court and officers trying to smear and corrupt Milan to other deputies, politicians, and Obrenović himself, who had their own plans to make Milan into a "real man" and a real master.

== Volunteer work ==
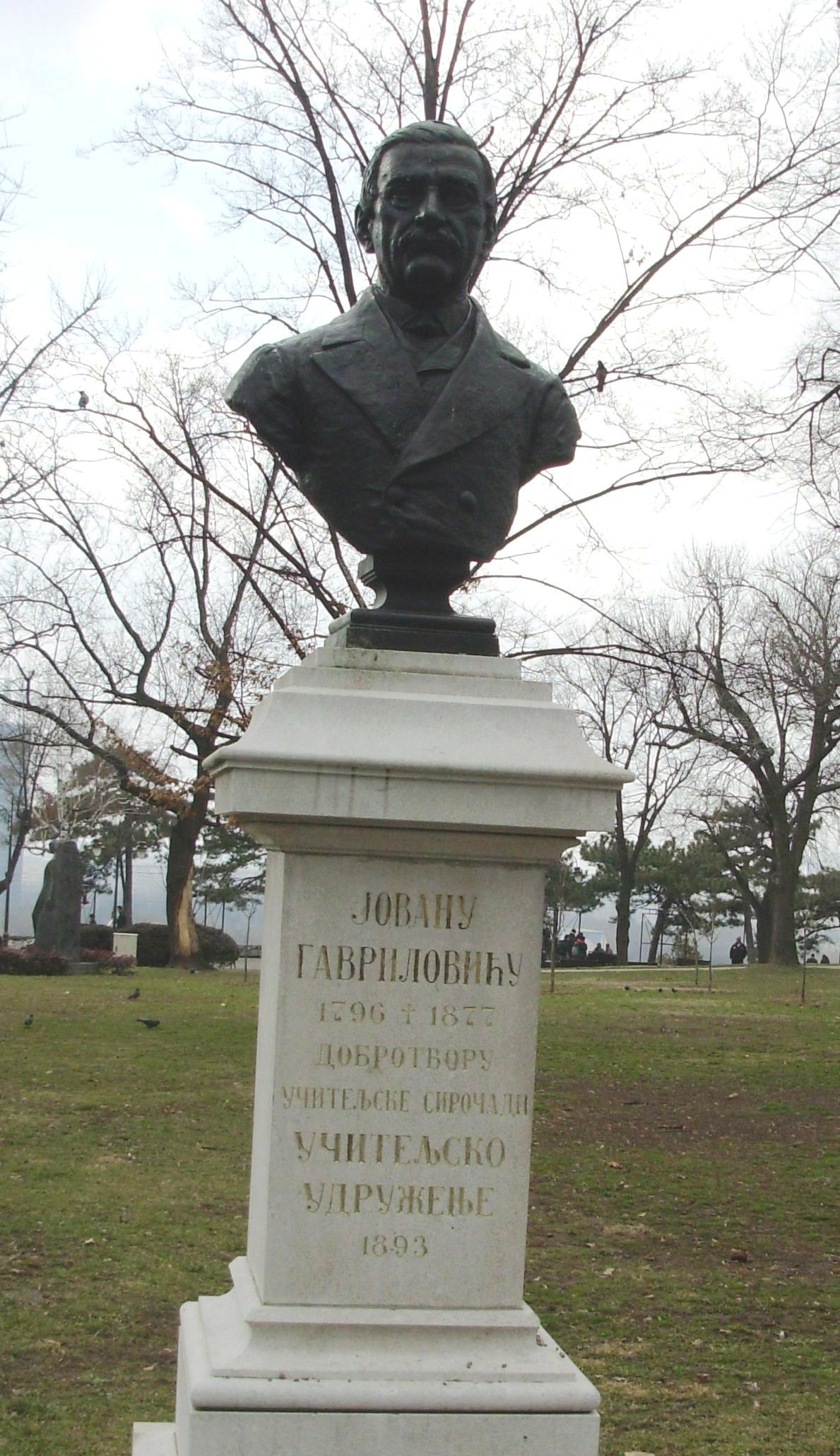
A bust of Gavrilović by Petar Ubavkić, ereceted in Kalemegdan

Gavrilović's enlightenment is considered his asset. In addition to philosophy, he studied history, especially the history of the First Serbian Uprising of which he had some recollection. Wealthy and knowledgeable, he did not hesitate to share his wealth and knowledge with others. It is thus recorded that, in addition to Vuk Karadžić, he also assisted Djura Daničić financially and wholeheartedly advocated for the reform of the Serbian language.

He respected and appreciated the ideas of Dositej Obradović and made friends with Lukijan Mušicki, and tried in various ways to help the development of higher education in the young Serbian state. He was a benefactor of the Teachers' Association since its inception. With a testament, he left his entire estate of 250,000 dinars in gold precisely to this endowment to establish a fund from which financial aid was paid for orphaned teachers and widows, and pensions for impoverished teachers.

Jovan Gavrilović died in Belgrade in 1877. After the relocation of the old Tašmajdan Cemetery, his earthly remains were transferred to Novo groblje in Belgrade.

In July 1893, the teachers' association erected a modest monument, a bust on a stone plinth, made by sculptor Petar Ubavkić, in a spot on Belgrade's Kalemegdan park.

== See also ==
- List of heads of state of Serbia
