= Ivo Pavićević =

Montenegrin and Serbian lawyer and Politician

Ivo Pavićević Ivan Pavićević
- Иво Павићевић; Иван Павићевић

Minister of Economy of Kingdom of Serbia
- In office 29 May – 12 August 1905
- Monarch: Peter I
- Prime Minister: Ljubomir Stojanović
- Preceded by: Svetolik Radovanović
- Succeeded by: Milorad Drasković

Minister of the Interior of Kingdom of Serbia
- In office 12 August 1905 – 29 April 1906
- Monarch: Peter I
- Prime Minister: Ljubomir Stojanović; Sava Grujić
- Preceded by: Ljubomir Stojanović
- Succeeded by: Stojan Protić

Minister of Justice of Kingdom of Serbia
- Interim
- In office 5 June – 12 August 1905
- Monarch: Peter I
- Prime Minister: Ljubomir Stojanović
- Preceded by: Nikola P. Nikolić
- Succeeded by: Dragutin Pečić

Yugoslav Royal Commissioner of the Royal Government for Montenegro
- In office 29 April 1919 – 28 April 1922
- Monarchs: Peter I Alexander I
- Prime Minister: Stojan Protić; Ljubomir Davidović; Milenko Vesnić; Nikola Pašić
- Preceded by: Stevo Petrović Vukotić (as President of the National Executive Committee)

Personal details
- Born: 1869 Principality of Serbia
- Died: 1926 (aged 56-57) Kingdom of Serbs, Croats and Slovenes
- Occupation: Politician
- Nickname: Lola

Ivan Pavićević (Serbian Cyrillic: Иван Павићевић; 1869–1926) was a Montenegrin and Serbian lawyer and politician, deputy in the National Assembly of Serbia and minister in government of Kingdom of Serbia.

After finishing primary school in Danilovgrad, he went to Kingdom of Serbia, and enrolled in gymnasium in Valjevo, graduated in Belgrade, where he later graduated from Faculty of Law, after which he worked as a lawyer in Negotin. He was elected MP for the Negotin and Valjevo districts for several terms. In the governments of Ljubomir Stojanović, he was the Minister of Economy (May–July 1905) and the Minister of the Interior (July 1905 – March 1906). He was a fierce propagandist of the unification of Serbia and Montenegro. In 1921 he became the Royal Commissioner of Montenegro, in the rank of Minister. Upon his arrival as commissioner, he took over power from Marko Daković and the Executive People's Committee.
