= Sherif Topal Osman Pasha =

- Born: 1804; İzmir, Ottoman Empire
- Died: 1874 (aged 69–70); Constantinople, Ottoman Empire
- Military career
- Branch: Ottoman Army

Sherif Topal Osman Pasha (1804–1874) was the last vizier of the Bosnia Eyalet (1861–1867) and the first wali of the Bosnia vilayet (1867-1869 and 1869-1869). He carried out administrative, cultural and economic reforms in Bosnia and Herzegovina. He left a great impact on the development of Sarajevo in the second half of the 19th century.
