= Prime Minister of Serbia =

Head of government

President of the Government of Serbia
- Председник Владе Србије; Predsednik Vlade Srbije
- Greater coat of arms of Serbia

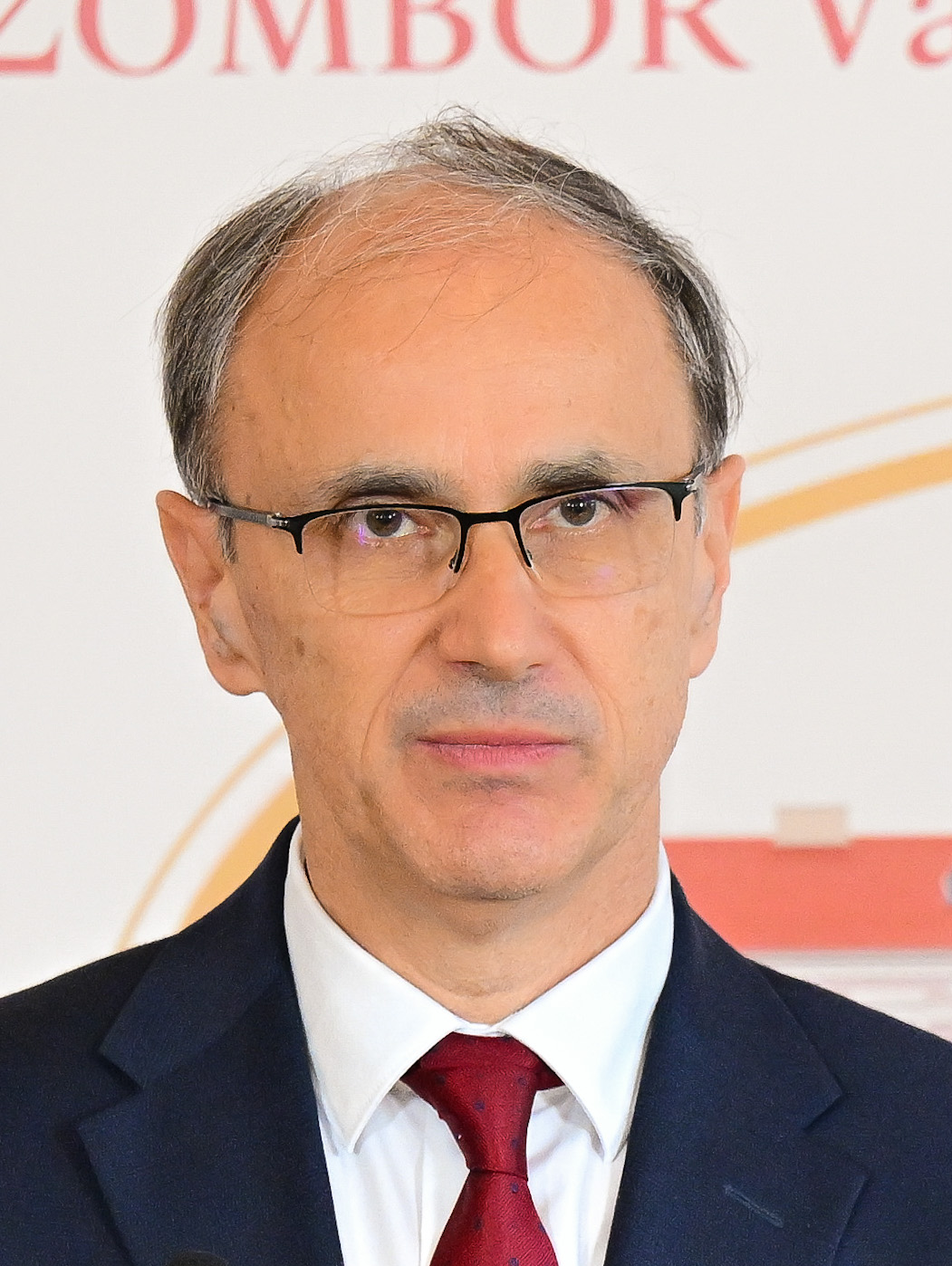
- Incumbent; Đuro Macut since 16 April 2025
- Executive branch; Head of the Government; Secretariat-General of the Government
- Style: Mr. Prime Minister (informal); His Excellency (diplomatic)
- Type: Head of government
- Member of: Government
- Residence: Villa Bor, Bulevar Kneza Aleksandra Karađorđevića 75, Belgrade
- Seat: Government Building, Nemanjina 11, Belgrade
- Nominator: President of the Republic
- Appointer: National Assembly
- Term length: Four years, no term limit
- Constituting instrument: Constitution of Serbia (2006)
- Formation: 27 August 1805; 221 years ago
- First holder: Matija Nenadović
- Deputy: First Deputy Prime Minister
- Salary: din. 211,000 / €1,800 monthly
- Website: srbija.gov.rs

The prime minister of Serbia (Serbian: премијер Србије, romanized: premijer Srbije; feminine: премијерка/premijerka), formally the president of the Government of the Republic of Serbia (Serbian: председник Владе Републике Србије, romanized: predsednik Vlade Republike Srbije; feminine: председница/predsednica) is the head of government of Serbia. The role of the prime minister is to direct the work of the Government, and submits to the National Assembly the government's program, including a list of proposed ministers. The resignation of the prime minister results in the dismissal of the government. In the formal order of precedence, the position of prime minister is the third highest state office, after the president of the Republic and the president of the National Assembly.

The first officeholder was Matija Nenadović, who became president of the Serbian Governing Council on 27 August 1805. The current prime minister, Đuro Macut was nominated by the president of the Republic, Aleksandar Vučić, and elected and appointed along with his cabinet by the National Assembly on 16 April 2025.

== History ==
During the period of Revolutionary Serbia, the title of the principal executive minister was President of the Serbian Governing Council (Председник правитељствујушчег совјета сербског / Predsednik praviteljstvujuščeg sovjeta serbskog). Initially the Council had no ministers, just members, but in 1811 modern ministries were created in the cabinet of Karađorđe Petrović. Government ceased to exist with the collapse of the First Serbian Uprising on 3 October 1813, however later continued in exile from 1813 until 1814.

Government was restored on 21 November 1815 following the Second Serbian Uprising. Head of government was styled Prince's Representative (Књажевски представник / Knjaževski predstavnik). The style remained official until 1861, even after the establishing of constitutional government in 1835. Prior to that date, the office was of no major importance or influence and depended solely on the will of the Prince Miloš Obrenović.

From 1861 until 1903, the head of government was styled President of the Ministry (Председник министарства / Predsednik ministarstva).

From 1903 until the creation of the Kingdom of the Serbs, Croats, and Slovenes on 1 December 1918, head of government was styled President of the Council of Ministers (Председник Министарског савета / Predsednik Ministarskog saveta).

Under the communist regime, after the end of World War II, governments were headed by President of the Government until 1953 and President of the Executive Council until 1990.

With the adoption of the Constitution in 1990 and restoration of multi-party system, the title is changed back to President of the Government, but the term Prime Minister is colloquially used.

== List of prime ministers ==
Denotes acting head of government

=== Revolutionary Serbia ===
No.	Portrait	Name (Birth–Death)	Term of office			Cabinet	Head of State (Grand Vožd)
President of the Serbian Governing Council; 1805–1813							Head of State (Grand Vožd)
1	Matija Nenadović	Matija Nenadović; Матија Ненадовић (1777–1854)	27 August 1805	April 1807	1 year, 7 months	М. Nenadović	Karađorđe Petrović (1804–1813)
2	Mladen Milovanović	Mladen Milovanović; Младен Миловановић (1760–1823)	April 1807	31 December 1810	3 years, 8 months	Milovanović	Karađorđe Petrović (1804–1813)
3	Jakov Nenadović	Jakov Nenadović; Јаков Ненадовић (1765–1836)	31 December 1810	11 January 1811	11 days	Ј. Nenadović	Karađorđe Petrović (1804–1813)
4	Karađorđe Petrović	Karađorđe Petrović; Карађорђе Петровић (1768–1817)	11 January 1811	3 October 1813	2 years, 265 days	Petrović	Karađorđe Petrović (1804–1813)

=== Principality of Serbia ===
Political party: Conservative Party Liberal Party Serbian Progressive Party Independent

No.	Portrait	Name (Birth–Death)	Term of office		Party	Head of State
Prince's Representative; 1815–1861						Head of State
Prince's Representative; 1815–1861						Grand Vožd; 1815–1817
Prince's Representative; 1815–1861						Prince; 1817–1882
5	Petar Nikolajević Moler	Petar Nikolajević Moler; Петар Николајевић Молер (1775–1816)	21 November 1815	16 May 1816	Independent	Miloš Obrenović (1815–1839)
6	Jevrem Obrenović	Jevrem Obrenović; Јеврем Обреновић (1790–1856)	1821	1826	Independent	Miloš Obrenović (1815–1839)
7		Miloje Todorović; Милоје Тодоровић (1762–1832)	1826	1826	Independent	Miloš Obrenović (1815–1839)
8	Dimitrije Davidović	Dimitrije Davidović; Димитрије Давидовић (1789–1839)	1826	1829	Independent	Miloš Obrenović (1815–1839)
9		Koca Marković; Коца Марковић (1795–1836)	15 February 1835	28 March 1836	Independent	Miloš Obrenović (1815–1839)
–	Tenka Stefanović	Tenka Stefanović; Стефан Стефановић Тенка (1797–1865)	28 March 1836	26 February 1839	Independent	Miloš Obrenović (1815–1839)
10	Avram Petronijević	Avram Petronijević; Аврам Петронијевић (1791–1852)	26 February 1839	7 April 1840	Independent	Miloš Obrenović (1815–1839)
10	Avram Petronijević	Avram Petronijević; Аврам Петронијевић (1791–1852)	26 February 1839	7 April 1840	Independent	Milan Obrenović (1839) Mihailo Obrenović (1839–1842)
–		Paun Janković; Паун Јанковић (1808–1865)	7 April 1840	15 May 1840	Independent	Milan Obrenović (1839) Mihailo Obrenović (1839–1842)
11		Đorđe Protić; Ђорђе Протић (1793–1857)	15 May 1840	7 September 1842	Independent	Milan Obrenović (1839) Mihailo Obrenović (1839–1842)
(10)	Avram Petronijević	Avram Petronijević; Аврам Петронијевић (1791–1852)	7 September 1842	6 October 1843	Independent	Milan Obrenović (1839) Mihailo Obrenović (1839–1842)
(10)	Avram Petronijević	Avram Petronijević; Аврам Петронијевић (1791–1852)	7 September 1842	6 October 1843	Independent	Alexander Karađorđević (1842–1858)
12	Aleksa Simić	Aleksa Simić; Алекса Симић (1800–1872)	6 October 1843	11 October 1844	Independent	Alexander Karađorđević (1842–1858)
(10)	Avram Petronijević	Avram Petronijević; Аврам Петронијевић (1791–1852)	11 October 1844	22 April 1852	Independent	Alexander Karađorđević (1842–1858)
13	Ilija Garašanin	Ilija Garašanin; Илија Гарашанин (1812–1874)	22 April 1852	26 March 1853	Independent	Alexander Karađorđević (1842–1858)
(12)	Aleksa Simić	Aleksa Simić; Алекса Симић (1800–1872)	26 March 1853	28 December 1855	Independent	Alexander Karađorđević (1842–1858)
14		Aleksa Janković; Алекса Јанковић (1806–1869)	28 December 1855	10 June 1856	Independent	Alexander Karađorđević (1842–1858)
–	Stefan Marković	Stefan Marković; Стефан Марковић (1804–1864)	10 June 1856	28 September 1856	Independent	Alexander Karađorđević (1842–1858)
(12)	Aleksa Simić	Aleksa Simić; Алекса Симић (1800–1872)	28 September 1856	1 July 1857	Independent	Alexander Karađorđević (1842–1858)
15	Stevan Marković	Stefan Marković; Стефан Марковић (1804–1864)	1 July 1857	12 June 1858	Independent	Alexander Karađorđević (1842–1858)
16	Stevan Magazinović	Stevan Magazinović; Стеван Магазиновић (1804–1874)	12 June 1858	18 April 1859	Independent	Alexander Karađorđević (1842–1858)
16	Stevan Magazinović	Stevan Magazinović; Стеван Магазиновић (1804–1874)	12 June 1858	18 April 1859	Independent	Miloš Obrenović (1858–1860)
17		Cvetko Rajović; Цветко Рајовић (1793–1873)	18 April 1859	8 November 1860	Independent	Miloš Obrenović (1858–1860)
17		Cvetko Rajović; Цветко Рајовић (1793–1873)	18 April 1859	8 November 1860	Independent	Mihailo Obrenović (1860–1868)
18	Filip Hristić	Filip Hristić; Филип Христић (1819–1905)	8 November 1860	21 October 1861	Independent	Mihailo Obrenović (1860–1868)
President of the Ministry; 1861–1882						Mihailo Obrenović (1860–1868)
(13)	Ilija Garašanin	Ilija Garašanin; Илија Гарашанин (1812–1874)	21 October 1861	15 November 1867	Conservative Party	Mihailo Obrenović (1860–1868)
19	Jovan Ristić	Jovan Ristić; Јован Ристић (1831–1899)	15 November 1867	3 December 1867	Liberal Party	Mihailo Obrenović (1860–1868)
20	Nikola Hristić	Nikola Hristić; Никола Христић (1818–1911)	3 December 1867	3 July 1868	Conservative Party	Mihailo Obrenović (1860–1868)
20	Nikola Hristić	Nikola Hristić; Никола Христић (1818–1911)	3 December 1867	3 July 1868	Conservative Party	Milan Obrenović (1868–1882)
21	Đorđe Cenić	Đorđe Cenić; Ђорђе Ценић (1825–1903)	3 July 1868	8 August 1869	Conservative Party	Milan Obrenović (1868–1882)
22	Radivoje Milojković	Radivoje Milojković; Радивоје Милојковић (1833–1888)	8 August 1869	22 August 1872	Liberal Party	Milan Obrenović (1868–1882)
23	Milivoje Blaznavac	Milivoje Blaznavac; Миливоје Блазнавац (1824–1873)	22 August 1872	5 April 1873	Independent	Milan Obrenović (1868–1882)
(19)	Jovan Ristić	Jovan Ristić; Јован Ристић (1831–1899)	5 April 1873	3 November 1873	Liberal Party	Milan Obrenović (1868–1882)
24	Jovan Marinović	Jovan Marinović; Јован Мариновић (1821–1893)	3 November 1873	7 December 1874	Serbian Progressive Party	Milan Obrenović (1868–1882)
25	Aćim Čumić	Aćim Čumić; Аћим Чумић (1836–1901)	7 December 1874	3 February 1875	Serbian Progressive Party	Milan Obrenović (1868–1882)
26		Danilo Stefanović; Данило Стефановић (1815–1886)	3 February 1875	31 August 1875	Conservative Party	Milan Obrenović (1868–1882)
27		Stevča Mihailović; Стевча Михаиловић (1804–1888)	31 August 1875	8 October 1875	Liberal Party	Milan Obrenović (1868–1882)
28	Ljubomir Kaljević	Ljubomir Kaljević; Љубомир Каљевић (1841–1907)	8 October 1875	6 May 1876	Serbian Progressive Party	Milan Obrenović (1868–1882)
(27)		Stevča Mihailović; Стевча Михаиловић (1804–1888)	6 May 1876	13 October 1878	Liberal Party	Milan Obrenović (1868–1882)
(19)	Jovan Ristić	Jovan Ristić; Јован Ристић (1831–1899)	13 October 1878	2 November 1880	Liberal Party	Milan Obrenović (1868–1882)
29	Milan Piroćanac	Milan Piroćanac; Милан Пироћанац (1837–1897)	2 November 1880	6 March 1882	Serbian Progressive Party	Milan Obrenović (1868–1882)

=== Kingdom of Serbia ===
Political party: Serbian Progressive Party Conservative Party Liberal Party People's Radical Party Independent Radical Party Independent

No.	Portrait	Name (Birth–Death)	Term of office		Party	King
President of the Ministry; 1882–1903						King
(29)	Milan Piroćanac	Milan Piroćanac; Милан Пироћанац (1837–1897)	6 March 1882	3 October 1883	Serbian Progressive Party	Milan I (1882–1889)
(20)	Nikola Hristić	Nikola Hristić; Никола Христић (1818–1911)	3 October 1883	19 February 1884	Conservative Party	Milan I (1882–1889)
30	Milutin Garašanin	Milutin Garašanin; Милутин Гарашанин (1843–1908)	19 February 1884	13 June 1887	Serbian Progressive Party	Milan I (1882–1889)
(19)	Jovan Ristić	Jovan Ristić; Јован Ристић (1831–1899)	13 June 1887	1 January 1888	Liberal Party	Milan I (1882–1889)
31	Sava Grujić	Sava Grujić; Сава Грујић (1840–1913)	1 January 1888	27 April 1888	People's Radical Party	Milan I (1882–1889)
(20)	Nikola Hristić	Nikola Hristić; Никола Христић (1818–1911)	27 April 1888	19 January 1889	Conservative Party	Milan I (1882–1889)
32	Kosta Protić	Kosta Protić; Коста Протић (1831–1892)	19 January 1889	7 March 1889	Independent	Milan I (1882–1889)
(31)	Sava Grujić	Sava Grujić; Сава Грујић (1840–1913)	7 March 1889	23 February 1891	People's Radical Party	Alexander I (1889–1903)
33	Nikola Pašić	Nikola Pašić; Никола Пашић (1845–1926)	23 February 1891	22 August 1892	People's Radical Party	Alexander I (1889–1903)
34	Jovan Avakumović	Jovan Avakumović; Јован Авакумовић (1841–1928)	22 August 1892	13 April 1893	Liberal Party	Alexander I (1889–1903)
35	Lazar Dokić	Lazar Dokić; Лазар Докић (1845–1893)	13 April 1893	5 December 1893	People's Radical Party	Alexander I (1889–1903)
(31)	Sava Grujić	Sava Grujić; Сава Грујић (1840–1913)	5 December 1893	24 January 1894	People's Radical Party	Alexander I (1889–1903)
36	Đorđe Simić	Đorđe Simić; Ђорђе Симић (1843–1921)	24 January 1894	3 April 1894	People's Radical Party	Alexander I (1889–1903)
37	Svetomir Nikolajević	Svetomir Nikolajević; Светомир Николајевић (1844–1922)	3 April 1894	27 October 1894	People's Radical Party	Alexander I (1889–1903)
(20)	Nikola Hristić	Nikola Hristić; Никола Христић (1818–1911)	27 October 1894	7 July 1895	Conservative Party	Alexander I (1889–1903)
38	Stojan Novaković	Stojan Novaković; Стојан Новаковић (1842–1915)	7 July 1895	27 December 1896	Serbian Progressive Party	Alexander I (1889–1903)
(36)	Đorđe Simić	Đorđe Simić; Ђорђе Симић (1843–1921)	27 December 1896	19 October 1897	People's Radical Party	Alexander I (1889–1903)
39	Vladan Đorđević	Vladan Đorđević; Владан Ђорђевић (1844–1930)	19 October 1897	25 July 1900	Serbian Progressive Party	Alexander I (1889–1903)
40	Aleksa Jovanović	Aleksa Jovanović; Алекса Јовановић (1846–1920)	25 July 1900	3 April 1901	Independent	Alexander I (1889–1903)
41	Mihailo Vujić	Mihailo V. Vujić; Михаило В. Вујић (1853–1913)	3 April 1901	20 October 1902	People's Radical Party	Alexander I (1889–1903)
42	Petar Velimirović	Petar Velimirović; Петар Велимировић (1848–1921)	20 October 1902	20 November 1902	People's Radical Party	Alexander I (1889–1903)
43	Dimitrije Cincar-Marković	Dimitrije Cincar-Marković; Димитрије Цинцар-Марковић (1849–1903)	20 November 1902	11 June 1903	Independent	Alexander I (1889–1903)
President of the Council of Ministers; 1903–1918
(34)	Jovan Avakumović	Jovan Avakumović; Јован Авакумовић (1841–1928)	11 June 1903	4 October 1903	Liberal Party	Peter I (1903–1918)
(31)	Sava Grujić	Sava Grujić; Сава Грујић (1840–1913)	4 October 1903	10 December 1904	People's Radical Party	Peter I (1903–1918)
(33)	Nikola Pašić	Nikola Pašić; Никола Пашић (1845–1926)	10 December 1904	28 May 1905	People's Radical Party	Peter I (1903–1918)
44	Ljubomir Stojanović	Ljubomir Stojanović; Љубомир Стојановић (1860–1930)	28 May 1905	7 March 1906	Independent Radical Party	Peter I (1903–1918)
(31)	Sava Grujić	Sava Grujić; Сава Грујић (1840–1913)	7 March 1906	29 April 1906	People's Radical Party	Peter I (1903–1918)
(33)	Nikola Pašić	Nikola Pašić; Никола Пашић (1845–1926)	29 April 1906	20 July 1908	People's Radical Party	Peter I (1903–1918)
(42)	Petar Velimirović	Petar Velimirović; Петар Велимировић (1848–1921)	20 July 1908	22 February 1909	People's Radical Party	Peter I (1903–1918)
(38)	Stojan Novaković	Stojan Novaković; Стојан Новаковић (1842–1915)	22 February 1909	24 October 1909	Serbian Progressive Party	Peter I (1903–1918)
(33)	Nikola Pašić	Nikola Pašić; Никола Пашић (1845–1926)	24 October 1909	4 July 1911	People's Radical Party	Peter I (1903–1918)
45	Milovan Milovanović	Milovan Milovanović; Милован Миловановић (1863–1912)	4 July 1911	18 June 1912	People's Radical Party	Peter I (1903–1918)
46	Marko Trifković	Marko Trifković; Марко Трифковић (1864–1928)	18 June 1912	12 September 1912	People's Radical Party	Peter I (1903–1918)
(33)	Nikola Pašić	Nikola Pašić; Никола Пашић (1845–1926)	12 September 1912	1 December 1918	People's Radical Party	Peter I (1903–1918)

=== People's Republic of Serbia / Socialist Republic of Serbia (constituent republic of Yugoslavia) ===
Political party: Communist Party of Serbia / League of Communists of Serbia Socialist Party of Serbia

No.	Portrait	Name (Birth–Death)	Term of office		Party
President of the Government; 1945–1953
1 (47)		Blagoje Nešković; Благоје Нешковић (1907–1984)	9 April 1945	5 September 1948	Communist Party of Serbia
2 (48)		Petar Stambolić; Петар Стамболић (1912–2007)	5 September 1948	5 February 1953	Communist Party of Serbia renamed in 1952 to League of Communists of Serbia
President of the Executive Council; 1953–1991
(2) (48)		Petar Stambolić; Петар Стамболић (1912–2007)	5 February 1953	16 December 1953	League of Communists of Serbia
3 (49)		Jovan Veselinov; Јован Веселинов (1906–1982)	16 December 1953	6 April 1957	League of Communists of Serbia
4 (50)		Miloš Minić; Милош Минић (1914–2003)	6 April 1957	9 June 1962	League of Communists of Serbia
5 (51)		Slobodan Penezić; Слободан Пенезић (1918–1964)	9 June 1962	6 November 1964	League of Communists of Serbia
–		Stevan Doronjski; Стеван Дороњски (1919–1981)	6 November 1964	17 November 1964	League of Communists of Serbia
6 (52)		Miodrag Stamenković; Миодраг Стаменковић (1920–2004)	17 November 1964	6 May 1967	League of Communists of Serbia
7 (53)		Đurica Jojkić; Ђурица Јојкић (1914–1981)	6 May 1967	7 May 1969	League of Communists of Serbia
8 (54)		Milenko Bojanić; Миленко Бојанић (1924–1987)	7 May 1969	6 May 1974	League of Communists of Serbia
9 (55)		Dušan Čkrebić; Душан Чкребић (1927–2022)	6 May 1974	6 May 1978	League of Communists of Serbia
10 (56)		Ivan Stambolić; Иван Стамболић (1936–2000)	6 May 1978	5 May 1982	League of Communists of Serbia
11 (57)		Branislav Ikonić; Бранислав Иконић (1928–2002)	5 May 1982	6 May 1986	League of Communists of Serbia
12 (58)		Desimir Jevtić; Десимир Јевтић (1938–2017)	6 May 1986	5 December 1989	League of Communists of Serbia
13 (59)		Stanko Radmilović; Станко Радмиловић (1936–2018)	5 December 1989	15 January 1991	League of Communists of Serbia
13 (59)		Stanko Radmilović; Станко Радмиловић (1936–2018)	5 December 1989	15 January 1991	Socialist Party of Serbia

=== Republic of Serbia (constituent republic of FR Yugoslavia / Serbia and Montenegro) ===
Political party: Socialist Party of Serbia Democratic Party Democratic Alternative Social Democratic Union Democratic Party of Serbia

No.	Portrait	Name (Birth–Death)	Term of office	Party	Cabinet	Composition	Election
President of the Government; 1991–2006
1 (60)	Dragutin Zelenović	Dragutin Zelenović; Драгутин Зеленовић (1928–2020)	11 February 1991 – 23 December 1991	Socialist Party of Serbia	Zelenović	SPS	1990
2 (61)		Radoman Božović; Радоман Божовић (born 1953)	23 December 1991 – 10 February 1993	Socialist Party of Serbia	Božović	SPS	1990
3 (62)	Nikola Šainović	Nikola Šainović; Никола Шаиновић (born 1948)	10 February 1993 – 18 March 1994	Socialist Party of Serbia	Šainović	SPS (minority government supported by SRS)	1992
4 (63)		Mirko Marjanović; Мирко Марјановић (1937–2006)	18 March 1994 – 24 October 2000	Socialist Party of Serbia	Marjanović I	SPS–ND	1993
4 (63)		Mirko Marjanović; Мирко Марјановић (1937–2006)	18 March 1994 – 24 October 2000	Socialist Party of Serbia	Marjanović II	SPS–JUL–SRS	1997
5 (64)		Milomir Minić; Миломир Минић (born 1950)	25 October 2000 – 25 January 2001	Socialist Party of Serbia	Minić	SPS–DOS–SPO (transitional government formed after the overthrow of Slobodan Milošević)	
6 (65)	Zoran Đinđić	Zoran Đinđić; Зоран Ђинђић (1952–2003)	25 January 2001 – 12 March 2003 (assassinated in office)	Democratic Party (Democratic Opposition of Serbia)	Đinđić	DOS	2000
–	Nebojša Čović	Nebojša Čović; Небојша Човић (born 1958)	12 March 2003 – 17 March 2003	Democratic Alternative (Democratic Opposition of Serbia)		DOS	2000
–	Žarko Korać	Žarko Korać; Жарко Кораћ (born 1947)	17 March 2003 – 18 March 2003	Social Democratic Union (Democratic Opposition of Serbia)		DOS	2000
7 (66)	Zoran Živković	Zoran Živković; Зоран Живковић (born 1960)	18 March 2003 – 4 March 2004	Democratic Party (Democratic Opposition of Serbia)	Živković	DOS	2000
8 (67)	Vojislav Koštunica	Vojislav Koštunica; Војислав Коштуница (born 1944)	4 March 2004 – 5 June 2006	Democratic Party of Serbia	Koštunica I	DSS–G17+–SPO–NS (minority government supported by SPS)	2003

=== Republic of Serbia ===
Political party: Democratic Party of Serbia Democratic Party Socialist Party of Serbia Serbian Progressive Party Independent

No.	Portrait	Name (Birth–Death)	Term of office	Party	Cabinet	Composition	Election	President
President of the Government (2006–present)								President
1 (67)	Vojislav Koštunica	Vojislav Koštunica; Војислав Коштуница (born 1944)	5 June 2006 – 7 July 2008	Democratic Party of Serbia	Koštunica I	DSS–G17+–SPO–NS (minority government supported by SPS)	2003	Boris Tadić (2006–2012)
1 (67)	Vojislav Koštunica	Vojislav Koštunica; Војислав Коштуница (born 1944)	5 June 2006 – 7 July 2008	Democratic Party of Serbia	Koštunica II	DS–DSS–G17+ NS–SDP	2007	Boris Tadić (2006–2012)
2 (68)	Mirko Cvetković	Mirko Cvetković; Мирко Цветковић (born 1950)	7 July 2008 – 27 July 2012	Independent (DS–affiliated)	Cvetković	DS–SPS–G17+–SDPS; PUPS–SPO–SDAS	2008	Boris Tadić (2006–2012)
3 (69)	Ivica Dačić	Ivica Dačić; Ивица Дачић (born 1966)	27 July 2012 – 27 April 2014	Socialist Party of Serbia	Dačić	SNS–SPS–SDPS; PUPS–NS–SDAS–PS; URS	2012	Tomislav Nikolić (2012–2017)
4 (70)	Aleksandar Vučić	Aleksandar Vučić; Александар Вучић (born 1970)	27 April 2014 – 31 May 2017	Serbian Progressive Party	Vučić I	SNS–SPS; SDPS–PS–NS	2014	Tomislav Nikolić (2012–2017)
4 (70)	Aleksandar Vučić	Aleksandar Vučić; Александар Вучић (born 1970)	27 April 2014 – 31 May 2017	Serbian Progressive Party	Vučić II	SNS–SPS; SDPS–PS–PUPS	2016	Tomislav Nikolić (2012–2017)
–	Ivica Dačić	Ivica Dačić; Ивица Дачић (born 1966)	31 May 2017 – 29 June 2017	Socialist Party of Serbia		SNS–SPS; SDPS–PS–PUPS	2016	Aleksandar Vučić (2017–2026)
5 (71)	Ana Brnabić	Ana Brnabić; Ана Брнабић (born 1975)	29 June 2017 – 20 March 2024	Independent (SNS–affiliated)	Brnabić	SNS–SPS–SDPS; PS–PUPS–SNP	2016	Aleksandar Vučić (2017–2026)
5 (71)	Ana Brnabić	Ana Brnabić; Ана Брнабић (born 1975)	29 June 2017 – 20 March 2024	Serbian Progressive Party (from 2019)	Brnabić	SNS–SPS–SDPS; PS–PUPS–SNP	2016	Aleksandar Vučić (2017–2026)
5 (71)	Ana Brnabić	Ana Brnabić; Ана Брнабић (born 1975)	29 June 2017 – 20 March 2024	Serbian Progressive Party (from 2019)	Brnabić II	SNS–SPS–SPAS; SDPS–PUPS–PS–SNP	2020	Aleksandar Vučić (2017–2026)
5 (71)	Ana Brnabić	Ana Brnabić; Ана Брнабић (born 1975)	29 June 2017 – 20 March 2024	Serbian Progressive Party (from 2019)	Brnabić III	SNS–SPS–DSHV–SDPS; PUPS–JS–SPP	2022	Aleksandar Vučić (2017–2026)
–	Ivica Dačić	Ivica Dačić; Ивица Дачић (born 1966)	20 March 2024 – 2 May 2024	Socialist Party of Serbia		SNS–SPS–DSHV–SDPS; PUPS–JS–SPP	2022	Aleksandar Vučić (2017–2026)
6 (72)	Miloš Vučević	Miloš Vučević; Милош Вучевић (born 1974)	2 May 2024 – 16 April 2025	Serbian Progressive Party	Vučević	SNS–SPS–DSHV–SDPS; PUPS–PS–SNP–SPP–SSZ	2023	Aleksandar Vučić (2017–2026)
7 (73)	Đuro Macut	Đuro Macut; Ђуро Мацут (born 1963)	16 April 2025 – Incumbent	Independent (SNS–affiliated)	Macut	SNS–SPS–SDPS; PUPS–SNP–SPP–SSZ	2023	Aleksandar Vučić (2017–2026)

== See also ==
- Government of Serbia
