= Đorđe Cenić =

Serbian politician

- Ђорђе Ценић
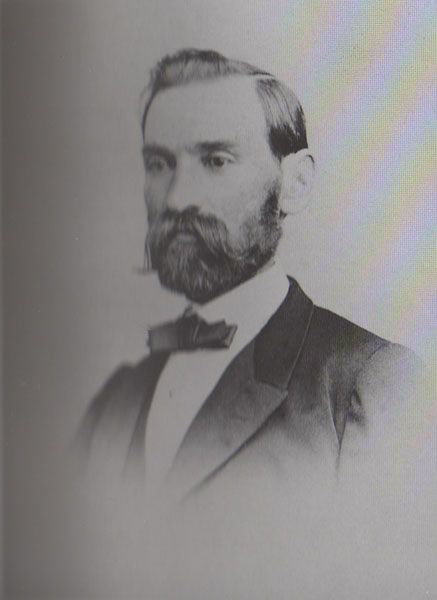

21st Prime Minister of Serbia
- In office 3 July 1868 – 8 August 1869
- Monarch: Milan I
- Preceded by: Nikola Hristić
- Succeeded by: Radivoje Milojković

Personal details
- Born: 6 February 1825 Belgrade, Principality of Serbia
- Died: 7 October 1903 (aged 78) Vienna, Austro-Hungary
- Occupation: politician, professor, lawyer

Đorđe Cenić (Serbian Cyrillic: Ђорђе Ценић; 6 February 1825 – 7 October 1903) was a Serbian politician, lawyer, professor and academic who served as Prime Minister of Serbia from 1868 to 1869.

== Biography ==
Born to a family of Dimitrije Cenić, a prominent trader based in Belgrade, Cenić was awarded a state scholarship and went on to study in Berlin, Heidelberg and Halle (Saale). After studies Cenić returned to Serbia and became a professor at modern-day University of Belgrade Faculty of Law.

At the age of 29 Cenić became the president of regional court in Smederevo, and later in Belgrade. After his work in a number of courts, Cenić became a government minister, serving as the Prime Minister of Serbia and the Minister of Justice in four terms. He made several reforms in attempt to modernise the country and is responsible for a number of modern laws resembling those of other European countries. Cenić abolished corporal punishment in Serbia.

Cenić was awarder Order of the Cross of Takovo, Order of White Eagle and Order of Miloš the Great. He bestowed his personal library to University of Belgrade Faculty of Law.

Government offices
Preceded by Jevrem Grujić	Minister of Justice; 1861–1862	Succeeded by Rajko Lešjanin
Preceded by Rajko Lešjanin	Minister of Justice; 1868–1889	Succeeded by Jovan Ilić
Preceded by Nikola Hristić	Prime Minister of Serbia; 1868–1869	Succeeded by Radivoj Milojković
Preceded by Marko Lazarević	Minister of Justice; 1873–1874	Succeeded by Milan Bogićević
