= Nikola Hristić =

Serbian politician

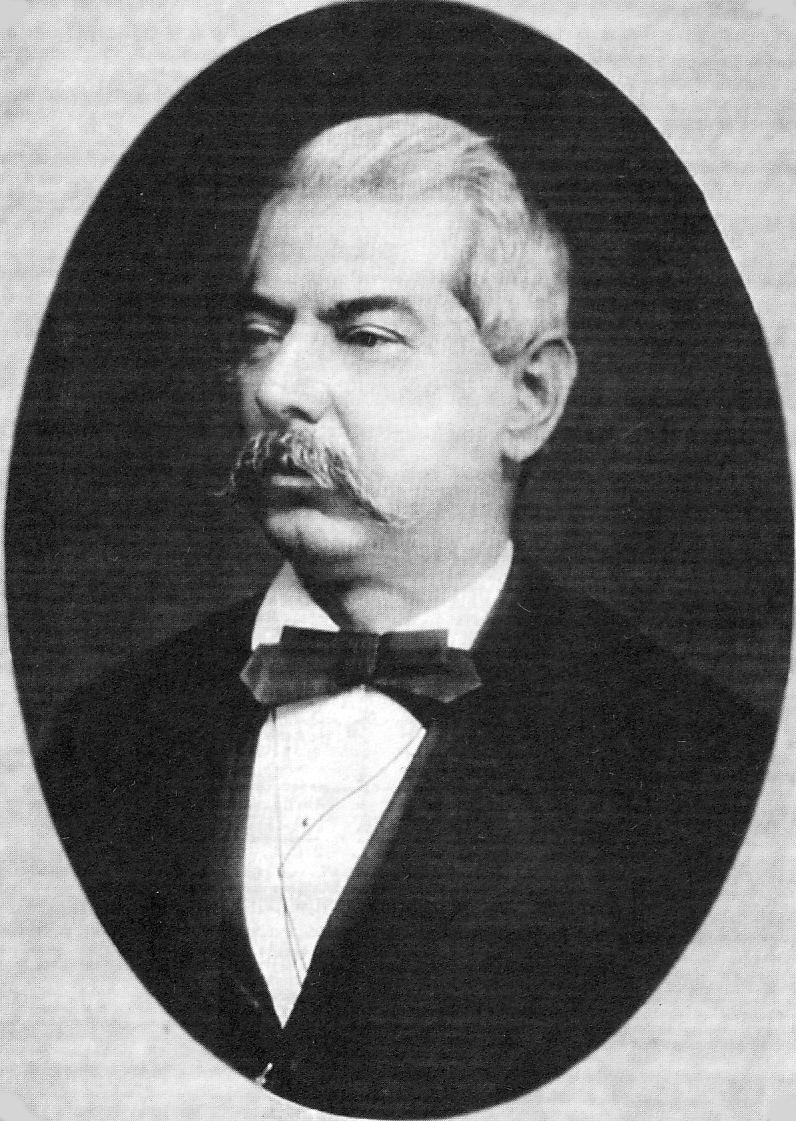

President of the Ministry of Serbia
- In office 3 December 1867 – 3 July 1868
- Monarch: Milan I
- Preceded by: Jovan Ristić
- Succeeded by: Đorđe Cenić
- In office 3 October 1883 – 19 February 1884
- Monarch: Milan I
- Preceded by: Milan Piroćanac
- Succeeded by: Milutin Garašanin
- In office 27 April 1888 – 19 January 1889
- Monarch: Milan I
- Preceded by: Sava Grujić
- Succeeded by: Kosta Protić
- In office 27 October 1894 – 7 July 1895
- Monarch: Alexander I
- Preceded by: Svetomir Nikolajević
- Succeeded by: Stojan Novaković

Personal details
- Born: 10 August 1818 Sremska Mitrovica, Austrian Empire
- Died: 26 November 1911 (aged 93) Belgrade, Serbia
- Party: Conservatives

Nikola Hristić (10 August 1818 – 26 November 1911) was a Serbian politician who served as Prime Minister of Serbia for four terms.

== Biography ==
Hristić was born and educated in Sremska Mitrovica. In 1840 he came to live and work in Belgrade, where he joined the Civil Service as a clerk in the Judiciary. Later he became head of the Serbian gendarmerie. Mihailo Obrenović made him Minister of Internal Affairs in 1860. On 15 June 1862 Hristić was a witness to what began as a skirmish but developed into a major conflict between the Serbian Gendarmerie and Turkish troops at Belgrade. The incident at Čukur Fountain (Čukur česma) began when a boy with a jug was shot and killed by a Turkish soldier which resulted in the bombardment of the Serbian capital by Turkish artillery ensconced in the Kalemegdan fortress. In his memoirs, Hristić wrote vividly of the extraordinary events that followed in which he played no small role in that affair. Serbia's de facto independence ensued in 1867, following the expulsion of all Ottoman troops from the country. Hristić was named president of the new Principality of Serbia until Mihailo's assassination in 1868. On that tragic day, Hristić ordered the arrest of the assassins, had them tried, convicted and shot before a firing squad. He was totally and completely loyal to Mihailo Obrenović. He re-organized the police force throughout the country, checked liberal opposition, eradicated brigandage, and was firmly in control of the municipalities.

He retired after Mihailo's death when a new government was formed under Milan I of Serbia. King Milan I was facing the Timok Rebellion, so he got Nikola Hristić out of retirement and installed him as the new prime minister and as the minister of internal affairs. The Timok Rebellion was successfully crushed, and the leaders of it, most notably Nikola Pašić of the People's Radical Party, fled to Bulgaria. After the rebellion was crushed, new elections were held in early 1884, and a new cabinet was formed under Milutin Garašanin. In 1884 Hristić was appointed vice president of the State Council. Milan erred in identifying Sava Grujić's views with the Radical party, which had not taken a stand on the divorce question. Consequently, he decided that he needed another cabinet to settle the divorce problem. Again Milan turned to the time-tested and dependable bureaucrat – Nikola Hristić – who put together a cabinet in April 1888. Hristić retired the following year, and in 1894 he came out of retirement to become prime minister for the fourth time. In mid-1895 he was dismissed and re-appointed as president of the State Council. Hristić finally retired for good in 1901.

Nikola Hristić was married to Juliana (born Hadži-Jovanović), the granddaughter of Toma Vučić-Perišić, one of the leaders of the Serbian Revolution. Hristić's son – Kosta (1852–1927) – was a lawyer, diplomat and minister of justice; his daughter Poleksija (1861–1933) was married to Laza Lazarević, the famed Serbian physician writer.

Nikola Hristić died on 26 November 1911 in Belgrade, at the age of 93.

== See also ==
- List of prime ministers of Serbia

Government offices
Preceded by Đorđe Milovanović	Minister of Internal Affairs; 1860–1868	Succeeded by Radivoje Milojković
Preceded by Jovan Ristić	Prime Minister of Serbia; 1867–1868	Succeeded by Đorđe Cenić
Preceded by Milan Piroćanac	Prime Minister of Serbia; 1883–1884	Succeeded by Milutin Garašanin
Preceded by Milutin Garašanin	Minister of Internal Affairs; 1883–1884	Succeeded by Stojan Novaković
Preceded by Sava Grujić	Prime Minister of Serbia; 1888–1889	Succeeded by Kosta Protić
Preceded by Sava Grujić	Minister of Foreign Affairs; 1888–1889	Succeeded by Kosta Protić
Preceded by Svetozar Milosavljević	Minister of Internal Affairs; 1888–1889	Succeeded by Jovan Beli-Marković
Preceded by Svetomir Nikolajević	Prime Minister of Serbia; 1894–1895	Succeeded by Stojan Novaković
Preceded by Svetomir Nikolajević	Minister of Internal Affairs; 1894–1895	Succeeded by Dimitrije Marinković
Preceded by Svetomir Nikolajević	Minister of Foreign Affairs; 1894–1895	Succeeded by Stojan Novaković
