= Stevča Mihailović =

Serbian politician and Prime Minister

Stevča Mihailović Стевча Михаиловић
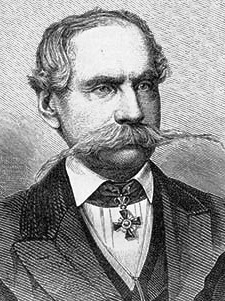

President of the Ministry of Serbia
- In office 31 August 1875 – 8 October 1875
- Monarch: Milan I
- Preceded by: Danilo Stefanović
- Succeeded by: Ljubomir Kaljević
- In office 6 May 1876 – 13 October 1878
- Monarch: Milan I
- Preceded by: Ljubomir Kaljević
- Succeeded by: Jovan Ristić

Personal details
- Born: January 1804 Jagodina, Ottoman Empire
- Died: 19 September 1888 (aged 84) Belgrade, Serbia
- Party: Liberal Party
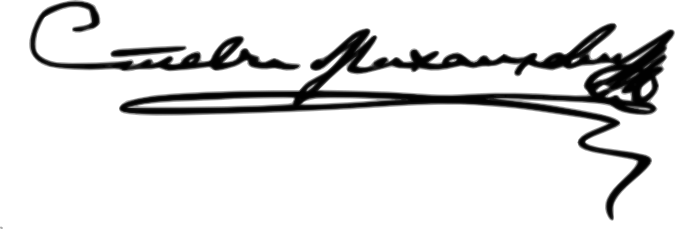
- Signature

Stevča Mihailović (January 1804 in Jagodina – September 19, 1888, in Belgrade), was a Serbian politician and Prime Minister.

Under the Prince Miloš he was a customs official, and during the first reign of Prince Mihailo district chief. In 1842, when Toma Vučić-Perišić rebelled in favor of the Constitution, the military tries to help the prince, but without success. Under Prince Alexander Karađorđević, Mihailović engaged in trade in Jagodina.

During the St. Andrew's Day Assembly in 1858, Mihailović was the leader of the Obrenović faction and led the delegation that demanded the abdication of Prince Alexander Karađorđević. After the return of prince Miloš Obrenović in 1858, he became president of the Council, while under Miloš' son and heir prince Mihailo's rule, he retired.

In 1875, and from 1876 until 1878, Mihailović became the Prime Minister. This second Mihailovic government led the country during the Serbian-Turkish Wars (1876-1878), and also led to Serbia's territorial expansion and independence at the Congress of Berlin.

== See also ==
- Cabinet of Stevča Mihailović II
- List of prime ministers of Serbia

Government offices
Preceded by Danilo Stefanović	Prime Minister of Serbia; 1875	Succeeded by Ljubomir Kaljević
Preceded by Ljubomir Kaljević	Prime Minister of Serbia; 1876–1878	Succeeded by Jovan Ristić
