= Jovan Marinović =

Serbian politician and diplomat

Jovan Marinović Јован Мариновић
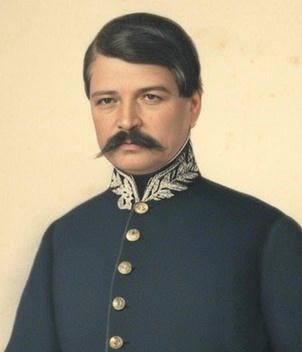

24th Prime Minister of Serbia
- In office 3 November 1873 – 7 December 1874
- Monarch: Milan I
- Preceded by: Jovan Ristić
- Succeeded by: Aćim Čumić

Minister of Finance
- In office 1856–1858
- Preceded by: Aleksandar Nenadović
- Succeeded by: Jovan Veljković

Personal details
- Born: 1821 Sarajevo, Bosnia Eyalet, Ottoman Empire
- Died: August 20, 1893 Villers-sur-Mer, French Third Republic
- Party: Serbian Progressive Party
- Occupation: Politician, diplomat

Jovan Marinović (Serbian Cyrillic: Јован Мариновић; 1821 – August 30, 1893) was a Serbian politician and diplomat. He introduced several enlightened reforms in Serbian political system. As a close collaborator of Minister Ilija Garašanin, Marinović became the leader of the Serbian Conservatives, eventually becoming Prime Minister of the Principality of Serbia. Educated in Paris, Marinović believed in European culture and reforms as a way of enlightening the Serbian peasant society. Being a member of one of the first generatiosn of Serbian Western-educated intellectuals, Marinović occupied several posts in the state administration. He was highly regarded as a diplomat.

== Early life ==
Born to a Serbian family in Sarajevo at the time part of the Bosnia Eyalet in the Ottoman Empire, Marinović moved to neighboring Principality of Serbia as a child.

He finished secondary school in Kragujevac in 1837 and obtained a job in the Chancery of the Prince (Knjaževa kancelarija) under Prince Miloš Obrenović I. Marinović studied in Paris from 1841 until 1842, returning to Serbia to work as a secretary in the State Council. In 1843, he returned to the Prince's chancery in the head capacity, this time under Prince Aleksandar Karađorđević as the Karađorđevićs in the meantime took the power in Serbia from the Obrenovićs.

Marinović went back to Paris in 1847, formally in order to finish his studies. However, in practice, he became the unofficial Serbian representative in the Kingdom of France, commonly known as the July Monarchy, a state ruled by King Louis Philippe I.

== Political career ==
During the French Revolution of 1848, part of the 1848-1849 revolutionary wave throughout central and western Europe, Marinović stayed in France, as the country transformed into the French Second Republic.

In the following years, Marinović was in charge of the Serbian foreign policy. Although formally performing other posts (Secretary of the State Council until 1850), Marinović was, as a special assistant to Ilija Garašanin, in control of the whole network of Serbian political propaganda in the Ottoman Empire. In 1853, Imperial Russia asked for the dismissal of both Garašanin and his first assistant Marinović for being too close to the Second French Empire and the Paris-based Polish agents of Adam Czartoryski and their representative in Belgrade.

Marinović later became Minister of Finance (1856–1858) and the President of the State Council (1861–1873). Between 1861 and 1867 Marinović was anew the first aide of Prime Minister Ilija Garašanin and Prince Mihailo Obrenović, during their ambitious policy of forming a wider Balkan alliance and fomenting a general Christian uprising against the Ottomans. Marinović was sent to confidential missions to St. Petersburg, Paris, London and Constantinople.

Marinović belonged to the political grouping of Serbian Conservatives (Ilija Garašanin, Danilo Stefanović, Nikola Hristić and Filip Hristić). As the highest-ranking conservative after Ilija Garašanin, Marinović became prime minister on November 3, 1873, under a Liberal-Conservative coalition and kept the portfolio of foreign minister (November 3, 1873, to December 7, 1874) as well. By administrative fiat, the Marinović cabinet established freedom of speech and the press, which was an important step in establishing parliamentary democracy. Nikola Krstić was working on changes in the press law for the Marinović Administration.

At the session of the Serbian Parliament held on November 27, 1873, the Marinović government presented a set of far-reaching reform laws, including the law on the subsidization of industrial enterprises and the law of six days of land ploughing ("day" meaning a Serbian land measurement equivalent to 5,760 m^{2}), as a minimal privately owned landed property protected from being sold or repossessed due to debts. This allowed Serbian peasants who were small landowners, at the time often victims of property loss due to predatory lending, to have at least 8.6 acres (35,000 m^{2}) of land (out of the total land which they owned) they could always count on as remaining in their possession. On December 23, 1873, his government instituted the law by which corporal punishment was abolished and the prison system reformed. Other reforms regarding secondary school and the Belgrade's Velika škola were passed as well.

The Marinović government introduced the metric system into Serbia as well as a native silver currency. After losing the majority among Liberal deputies in Parliament in 1874, the Marinović cabinet became the first Serbian government to be toppled in the National Assembly and called for new elections. After being defeated at the parliamentary elections in October 1874, Marinović resigned. He was appointed Serbian Envoy to Paris from 1879 to 1889.

== Personal ==
Marinović married Persida Anastasijević, one of the wealthy merchant Miša Anastasijević's five daughters. Their marriage was seen as the continuation of Miša Anastasijević's practice of marrying his daughters off to important decision-makers in the Principality of Serbia thereby securing personal wealth and expanding political influence.

Jovan Marinović and Persida had three children — two sons and a daughter.

One of their sons, Velizar, later married Agripina Bronkov, a Russian woman of Polish ancestry, moving with her to France where their son Petar Marinović was born in 1898. Known in France as Pierre Marinovitch, young Petar became an aviator with French Air Force in World War I, distinguishing himself as a flying ace.

Government offices
Preceded by Aleksandar Nenadović	Minister of Finance of Serbia; 1856–1858	Succeeded by Jovan Veljković
Preceded by Jovan Ristić	Prime Minister of Serbia; 1873–1874	Succeeded by Aćim Čumić
Preceded by Jovan Ristić	Minister of Foreign Affairs; 1873–1874	Succeeded by Milan Piroćanac
