= Danilo Stefanović =

Serbian politician (1815–1886)

- Данило Стефановић

Prime Minister of the Principality of Serbia
- In office 3 February 1875 – 31 August 1875
- Monarch: Milan I
- Preceded by: Aćim Čumić
- Succeeded by: Stevča Mihailović

Personal details
- Born: 8 May 1815 Temesvár, Kingdom of Hungary, Austrian Empire (now Timișoara, Romania)
- Died: 12 February 1886 (aged 70) Belgrade, Kingdom of Serbia
- Party: Conservative Party
- Occupation: politician

Danilo Magnum Stefanović (8 May 1815 – December 2, 1886) was a Serbian politician who served as the Prime Minister of Serbia.

== Biography ==
Danilo Stevanović was born on 8 May 1815 in Temesvár. He was the son of Jovan Stevanović, a Poreč timberman, and a brother to prominent politician Tenka Stefanović. Stefanović was educated in Poreč, Požarevac, and Belgrade. After his education, he learned the tertiary craft and then began his trade.

In 1838 Prince Miloš Obrenović appointed him head of the Poreč-Reka district, and as early as 1839 he became assistant to the head person of the Krajina district. He was transferred to Zaječar in 1844 for an assistant to the mayor, and in 1848 he was appointed the chief of a district. Subsequently, he was transferred in 1852 to the mayor of the Čačak district, and in 1856 to the mayor of the fire district. In 1859, Prince Miloš appointed him a member of the State Council, and Prince Mihailo Obrenović confirmed him in 1860. The Old Council was abolished in 1869, but Danilo was appointed a member of the new State Council on September 20, 1869. Danilo was married to the daughter of Nikola Lunjevica by his first wife, making him an uncle of the future Queen Draga of Serbia.

In February 1875 Aćim Čumić resigned as Prime Minister and Stevanović was given the mandate to form a new government, serving as the Minister of the Interior as well. He did not like the Nominal Constitution of 1869, according to which the National Assembly had quite wide powers to draft laws and Stefanović dislike ke the fact that the composition of a village assembly of mostly illiterate deputies drafted laws and that ministers had to respond to the interpellations before such an assembly. Because he looked old-fashioned, he was known as "Uncle Danilo". Prince Milan Obrenović chose mostly younger conservatives for the government, but the majority-liberal assembly opposed the ministers and the government. Danilović himself was not a politician but a bureaucrat, and in doing so he was to suppress the heated political passions between conservatives and liberals, and his government was called "a ministry of reconciliation and goodwill." Stefanović's government largely engaged in current affairs and avoided any major political issues. However, the political altercation of the Liberal Majority caused the Conservatives to obstruct the Assembly, and the Government barely welcomed this as a reason for the dissolution of the Assembly.

Herzegovina uprising (1875–1877) or the Nevesinje rifle erupted during the government of Danilo Stefanović. The government allowed volunteers rallies to assist the rebels in Herzegovina and provided them with weapons from military warehouses, and transferred some of the forces across the border.

== Police persecution ==
Following the dissolution of the assembly, the government sought to force a conservative majority in the assembly in a new election. Since Danilo was the interior minister and an experienced police officer, it was expected that he would have more success than Aćim Čumić had in a similar attempt a year earlier. On the eve of the election of 15 August 1875, Danilo returned several old clerks to the service and gave the mayors instructions as to who should be elected MP. Danilo's police persecuted or imprisoned opposition MPs and arrested those who agitated for the opposition. However, the elections were again won by the Liberals which made the prince to decide to form the Liberal government of Stevča Mihailović in August 1875. Danilo retired from public duty in 1879.

== See also ==
- List of prime ministers of Serbia

== Sources ==
- Milićević, Milan Duro (1888). Pomenik znamenitih ljudi u srpskog naroda novijega doba. U Srpskoj kraljevskoj štampariji.
