= Aćim Čumić =

Serbian politician

- Аћим Чумић
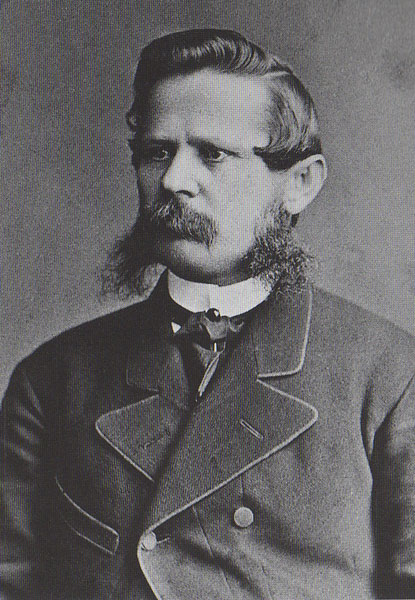

Prime Minister of the Principality of Serbia
- In office 7 December 1874 – 3 February 1875
- Monarch: Milan I of Serbia

Minister of the Interior of Serbia
- In office 1873–1874
- Prime Minister: Jovan Marinović

Judge of the Court of Cassation
- In office 22 January 1875 – 1878

Personal details
- Born: 1836 Aranđelovac, Principality of Serbia
- Died: 27 July 1901 (aged 64–65) Kusadak, Kingdom of Serbia
- Party: Serbian Progressive Party

Aćim Čumić (Serbian Cyrillic: Аћим Чумић; 1836 – 27 July 1901) was a Serbian jurist and politician who served as Prime Minister of the Principality of Serbia.

== Biography ==
Aćim Čumić studied and completed his law degree at the universities in Heidelberg and Paris. He worked as a high school professor, then in court. He was appointed Professor of Criminal Law at the Velika škola in 1865. He participated in the work of the Constitutional Committee of 1868 and was noted for his eloquence and for suggesting that the government was to be placed under the control of the State Council, and not the Assembly.

He was a politician of conservative orientation, sharing similar beliefs with older politicians such as Ilija Garašanin and Jovan Marinović. He was the leader of a group of young conservatives.

In 1871, he became president of the Belgrade municipality but was soon overthrown by the Liberal deputy, headed by Jovan Ristić. He then opened his law practice in Belgrade, and from 1873 to 1874, he was Minister of the Interior in Prime Minister Marinović's cabinet.

On 25 November 1874, Čumić replaced Marinović, who resigned, and became prime minister himself. As the government did not enjoy the confidence of the National Assembly, Čumić was replaced after another three months, on 22 January 1875. He was then appointed Judge of the Court of Cassation.

He was arrested by the Liberal government in 1878 for alleged involvement in the Topola Mutiny and was sentenced to death together with Jevrem Marković and Ilija Milosavljević Kolarac. He was later pardoned and received a commuted sentence of 10 years in prison instead. Marković was the only one executed. Čumić and Kolarac were released from prison after the fall of the Ristić government in 1880. Later, Čumić ceased his engaging in politics.

During the 1880s he was a government representative ('commissioner') of the Serbian Railways Construction and Exploitation organization. He was very involved in raising the Ilija M. Kolarac Endowment.

He was a member of the Serbian Learned Society and an honorary member of the Serbian Royal Academy since 1892. He served as a senator during the Kingdom of Serbia in 1901.

== Works ==
- Cassation Power [Касацијона власт] (1867)
- Endowments in Defense of Serbs [Задужбине у одбрани Српства] (1890)

== See also ==
- List of prime ministers of Serbia
- Avram Petronijević
- Toma Vučić-Perišić
- Dimitrije Davidović
- Ilija Garašanin
- Stevan Magazinović
