= Aleksa Janković =

Serbian lawyer and politician

Aleksa Janković Алекса Јанковић

14th Prime Minister of Serbia
- In office 28 December 1855 – 10 June 1856
- Preceded by: Aleksa Simić
- Succeeded by: Stefan Marković

Personal details
- Born: 1806 Timișoara, Austrian Empire
- Died: 22 June 1869 (aged 62–63) Belgrade, Principality of Serbia
- Occupation: politician, ambassador

Aleksa Janković (Serbian Cyrillic: Алекса Јанковић; 1806 in Timișoara – 22 June 1869 in Belgrade) was a Serbian lawyer and politician who served as Prime Minister of Serbia, Minister of Foreign Affairs, Minister of Justice and Minister of Education. He held pro-Austrian political views and was a close associate of Toma Vučić Perišić.

He attended high school in Timișoara and went to study law in Budapest. In 1834 he arrived in Serbia and was appointed clerk at the chancery of Prince Miloš Obrenović. In 1839 he returned to the Prince's chancery, only to witness the coming to power of the Karađorđević dynasty headed by Prince Alexander Karađorđević, who accelerated Aleksa Janković's career.

As of 1864 Janković became an honorary member of the Society of Serbian Letters, which later became the Serbian Academy of Sciences and Arts.

Government offices
Preceded by Avram Petronijević	Minister of Foreign Affairs; 1843	Succeeded by Aleksa Simić
Preceded by Paun Janković	Minister of Justice; 1848	Succeeded by Tenka Stefanović
Preceded by Avram Petronijević	Minister of Foreign Affairs; 1852	Succeeded by Ilija Garašanin
Preceded by Stevan Magazinović	Minister of Foreign Affairs; 1855–1856	Succeeded by Filip Hristić
Preceded by Stevan Magazinović	Prime Minister of Serbia; 1855–1856	Succeeded by Filip Hristić
