= 1835 Constitution of Serbia =

Candlemas Constitution

Candlemas Grand National Assembly
- Long title: Constitution of the Principality of Serbia
- Territorial extent: Serbia
- Enacted by: Candlemas Grand National Assembly
- Enacted: 14 February 1835

Repeals
- 11 April 1835

Related legislation
- French Constitution; 1838 Constitution
- Status: Repealed

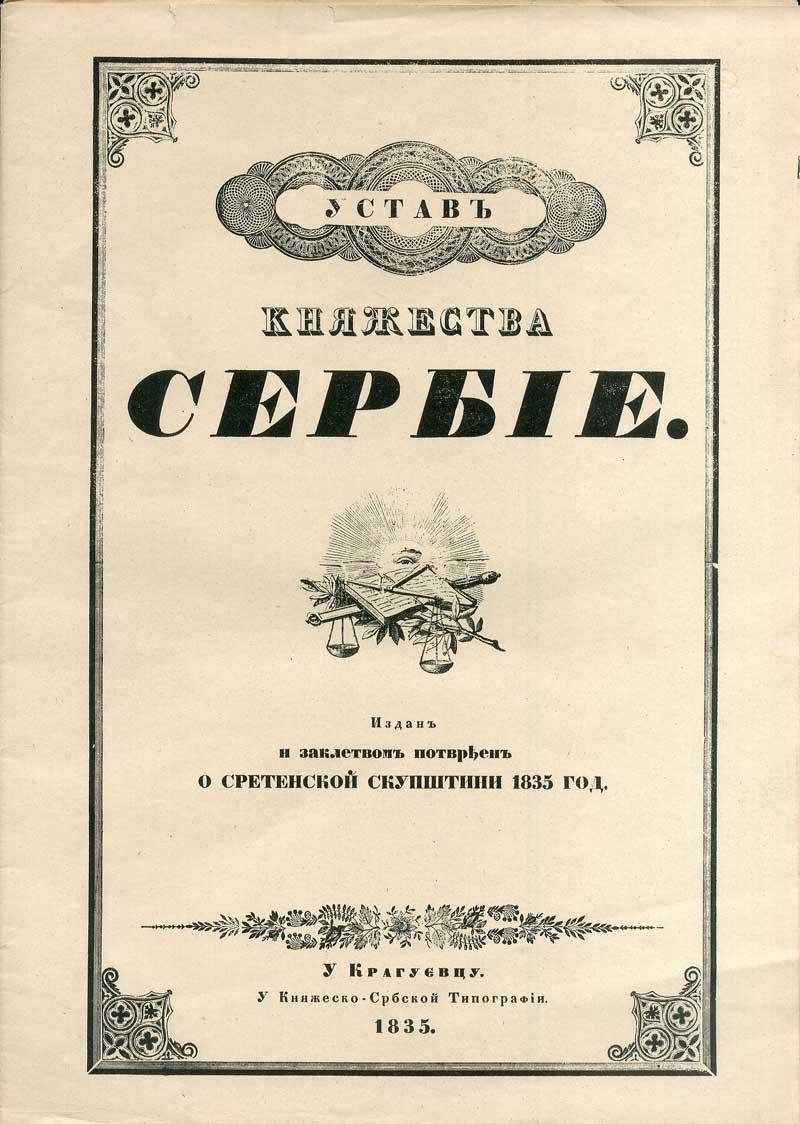
Front page of the Sretenje Constitution

The Constitution of the Principality of Serbia (Slavonic-Serbian: Уставъ Княжества Сербїе) known as the Sretenje Constitution ("Candlemas Constitution"), was the first constitution of the Principality of Serbia, adopted in Kragujevac in 1835. The Constitution was written by Dimitrije Davidović. The Constitution divided the power into legislative, executive and judicial branches, which is still considered the standard of democracy and constitutionality today.

The government consisted of the prince, the State Council and the National Assembly. The constitution stipulated that the prince and the State Council share the executive power. Citizens' rights and freedoms were protected, such as the inviolability of personality, the independence of the judiciary and the right to a lawful trial, freedom of movement and settlement, the right to choose a profession, equality of citizens, regardless of religion and ethnicity.

Although enacted by the Grand National Assembly, the constitution was suspended after only 55 days under pressure from the Great Feudal Powers (Turkey, Russia and Austria). Today, the original copy of the document is kept in the National Archives of Serbia.

== History ==
=== Serbian Revolution ===
The Revolutionary War first began as a local uprising against the usurper of Dahija in 1804 after the assembly at Sretenje in Orašac, where Đorđe Petrović Karađorđe was elected as leader. During the First Serbian Uprising, three constitutional acts were drafted. The first in 1805, the second in 1808 and the last in 1811. The act written on 14 December 1808 represents the first written and formal act of independent organisation of Serbia. This act formally abolishes Nahija and self-government and establishes a centralist system of administration. The period of mixed Serbian-Turkish administration, which lasted from 1815 to 1830, was marked by the gradual suppression of the Turkish authorities and the concentration of power in the hands of Miloš Obrenović. The Turkish authorities were represented by the Belgrade Pasha or Vizier, the Kadija and the Muselli, while the Serbian authorities were represented by the Supreme Prince of Serbia, the People's Office and others, and since 1820, special Serbian courts have been established. In October 1826, the Ottoman Empire pressured by the request of the new Russian emperor was forced to accept the conclusion of the so-called Akerman conventions. The fifth article of the Convention stipulated that the Porta would immediately enforce the provisions, the eighth item of the Bucharest Peace, concerning the Serbian people.

Feeling the agitation of the masses of people, the prince promised significant legislative and administrative reforms at the 1 February 1834 Assembly.

=== Mileta's Rebellion ===
The absence of the state system and the court in Serbia was very felt, as the number of humiliated officials, who were beaten. They were not ready to suffer the behaviour of Prince Miloš and his closest associates. In addition, Miloš still avoided organising the council, according to the 1830 constitution, but he was obliged to do that. Despite formally relieving the peasants of feudal relations, Prince Miloš still retained certain feudal obligations, which would almost cost him his reign a little later.

Feeling the agitation of the masses of people, the prince promised significant legislative and administrative reforms at the 1 February 1834 Assembly. He also gave one draft constitution, and before it was drafted he appointed five ministers. He appointed Lazar Teodorović as Minister of Justice and Education, Đorđe Protić as Minister of the Interior, Koca Marković as Minister of Finance, Toma Vučić Perišić as Minister of the army and Minister of Foreign Affairs Dimitrije Davidović. However, he did not specify their duties by any decree. As Miloš continued to behave as before, his opponents believed that he will do something if a rebellion was clearly shown. This is how the plot against the prince began. At the beginning of January 1835, in Kruševac, in the house of Stojan Simić, an agreement was made between the oppositionists by Milosav Zdravković Resavac, Mile Radojković, Đorđe Protić, Milutin Petrović Era (brother of Hajduk Veljko) and Avram Petronijević. The collision, which the opposition reached, entails filing a request to Prince Miloš, as well as violent means if he refuses the request. At the meeting, some suggested killing, others to overthrow and expel, however, the view of Mileta Radojković prevailed, according to which the rebellion was named - Mileta's rebellion, to restrict the power of Prince Miloš by the constitution, abolish the kulak, allow the people the right to the use of forest and, most importantly, for disenfranchised merchants, abolishes the monopoly on trade.

When the time came for action, Simić brought a few people from Kruševac, while the others failed to gather anyone behind. Only Mileta Radojković brought a large number of people from Jagodina to Kragujevac. When the revolutionaries arrived near Kragujevac, they were greeted by an assembled people to whom Petronijević gave a burning speech accusing Prince Miloš of acting as a pasha and imposing on the people his state as his heritage. The revolutionaries were met by Toma Vučić Perišić, who stood in defence of Prince Miloš but left an army of 150 horsemen to take care of Captain Petar Tucaković, avoiding conflict until he knew the reasons for the rebellion. In the meantime, the rebels in Kragujevac suggested that Požarevac might be attacked (that is where Prince Miloš was located), but Mileta still remained to limit the prince's authority. Vučić agreed to be the mediator and conveyed the news to the prince, who even thought of running away. Miloš decided, and most probably after Vučić's speech, to reach a final agreement with the leaders of the popular rebellion. Frightened by this rebellion, Prince Miloš decided to issue a constitution and establish a State Council after the meeting. He entrusted the making of the constitution to Dimitrije Davidović and convened the Assembly on 2 February / 14 February 1835.

=== Adoption ===
The constitution was drafted by Dimitrije Davidović. Several historians see it as being modelled on the French constitution of 1791 and the constitutional charters of 1814 and 1830, and the Belgian constitution of 1831. Davidović gave a brief outline of the U.S. Constitution in "Serbian Gazette" No. 15 of 25 April 1835. He coined a new term for the constitution that replaced the former Serbian term "конштитуција". In a semi-independent principality, Davidović drafted the supreme legal act of a liberal organisation in a very free-spirited manner, and the Constitution was divided into 14 chapters and 142 articles.

The Constitution divided power into legislative, executive and judicial branches. Legislative and executive power belonged to the prince and the Council of State, and the courts were independent courts. The executive power consisted of six ministers and the Council President also chaired ministerial sessions. On 2 February 1835, according to the new calendar, on 14 February, a Sretenje Constitution was passed in the prince's meadows in Kragujevac and with the presence of 2,500 participants and 10,000 spectators, after which the prince was taken from the mass of the world in his hands, and while voting was previously conducted in districts without a main hearing. The next day, the constitution was read and published in a solemn manner, with flags and ceremonial music, the prince's cavalry and infantry guards, and the presence of the state top and deputies. In the evening, a fireworks show and a theatre play were held.

The Constitution was in force for only 14 days (55 days). The largest European empires of Russia, Turkey, Austria, Prussia, as well as many smaller countries, did not have Constitutions at the time, nor did they adopt them in due course. That is why all of them opposed and agreed that the Constitution was revolutionary and against their feudal order. On 11 April 1835, the Constitution was repealed.

== Sources ==
- Avramović, Sima (2020). "Srenjski Ustav – 175 godina posle". Pravni fakultet Univerziteta u Beogradu. Univerzitet u Beogradu. pp. 248–311.
