= Cvetko Rajović =

Serbian politician

Kavalir Cvetko Rajović Цветко Рајовић
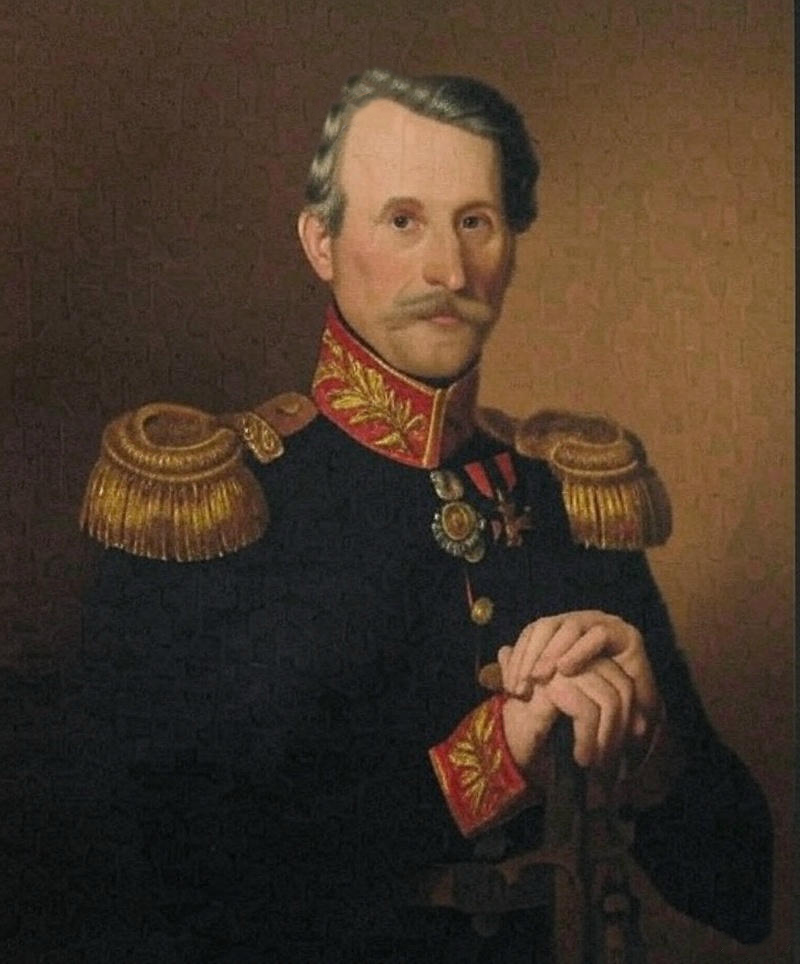

17th Prime Minister of Serbia
- In office 18 April 1859 – 8 November 1860
- Monarchs: Miloš I Mihailo III
- Preceded by: Stevan Magazinović
- Succeeded by: Filip Hristić

Minister of Foreign Affairs
- In office 6 April 1859 – 27 October 1860
- Preceded by: Stevan Magazinović
- Succeeded by: Filip Hristić

Minister of Internal Affairs
- In office 16 May 1840 – 8 September 1842
- Preceded by: Đorđe Protić
- Succeeded by: Toma Vučić Perišić

Minister of Finance
- In office 1840
- Preceded by: Aleksa Simić
- Succeeded by: Anta Protić

Personal details
- Born: 1793 Vukovići, Sanjak of Herzegovina, Ottoman Empire
- Died: 4 May 1873 (aged 79–80) Belgrade, Principality of Serbia
- Occupation: politician, soldier
- Awards: Order of Glory; Order of Saint Vladimir

Military service
- Allegiance: Revolutionary Serbia; Principality of Serbia
- Branch/service: Army of the Principality of Serbia
- Rank: Colonel
- Conflicts: First Serbian Uprising

Cvetko Rajović (Serbian Cyrillic: Цветко Рајовић; 1793 – 4 May 1873) was a Serbian cavalry officer, judge, and politician who served as the 17th Prime Minister of Serbia from 1858 to 1860. An Obrenović loyalist and frequent conspirator against the rival Karađorđević dynasty, he also held the posts of Minister of Internal Affairs, Minister of Foreign Affairs and Minister of Finance.

== Biography ==
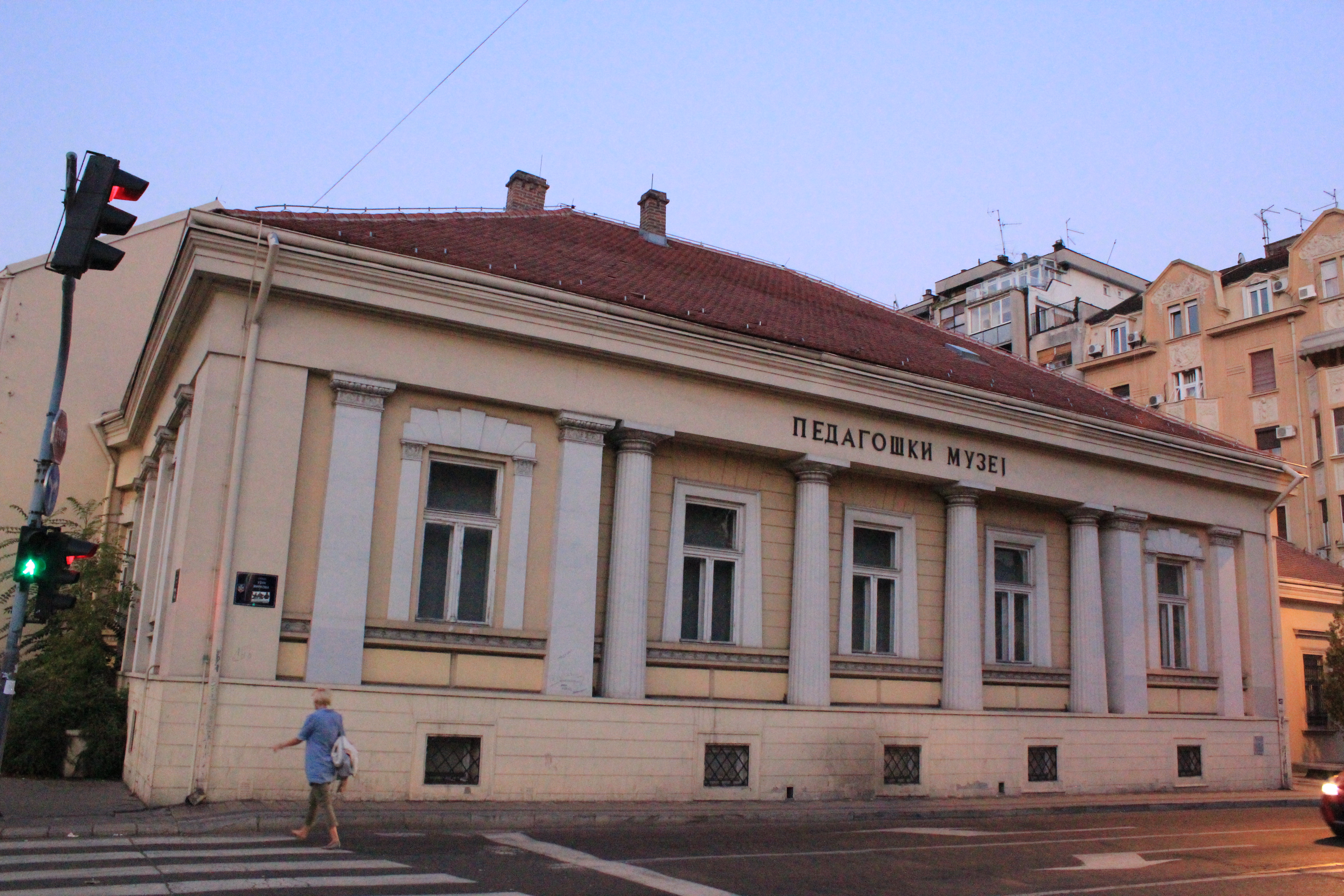
The Belgrade house of Cvetko Rajović, built in 1840, now home to the Museum of Pedagogy

Rajović was born into a Serbian Orthodox family in Vukovići, near Trebinje, in 1793. When he was a young boy, the family home was attacked by the local ağa and his henchmen. Rajović's father killed the ağan and his men in the ensuing fight, thus forcing the family to flee across the mountains to the Bay of Kotor for fear of retribution. From there, Rajović was sent to Rijeka, in the Habsburg realm, where his brother was a merchant. His brother paid for him to be educated in Otočac and Senj, during which time he learned German and Italian. Due to the War of the Fifth Coalition, Rajović and his brother relocated to Zemun, where he continued his education and learned to speak Greek, which was widely spoken among the large Greek merchant class in the city.

In 1811, Rajović, who was then living in Belgrade, entered into military service in the army of Revolutionary Serbia. Following the failure of the First Serbian Uprising, Rajović traveled to Srem, Trieste, Venice, Vienna, and finally Odessa, at which point he entered into the food trade, until the global financial crisis of 1818 caused prices to collapse. Rajović then returned to Belgrade, in the newly autonomous Principality of Serbia, where he opened a grain trading firm. The fledgling principality was in great need of educated Serbs from abroad who began moving into the territory, and Rajović was quickly noticed by Jevrem Obrenović, who was then Prime Minister of Serbia and brother of Prince Miloš. Obrenović invited Rajović to be his secretary, and he soon found himself in service of the prince himself. A valuable asset to the prince, Rajović served the principality in a number of capacities, including that of a diplomat, a lawmaker, military commissar, and chief of police. He went on a mission with Avram Petronijević to Saint Petersburg in 1830 to purchase a new state printing press, which led to publishing of the official newspaper Novine Serbske edited by Dimitrije Davidović in early 1834. In 1837, Rajović was made adjutant to the prince, and was made Minister of Internal Affairs in 1840, a position he held until 1842.

Rajović was known as a staunch supporter of the Obrenović dynasty and the culprit of several plots aimed against the Karađorđević dynasty, including the Hussar Rebellion of 1844 and the Tenka's Plot of 1857, both of which resulted in his imprisonment and death sentences which were commuted. Upon the return of Miloš I Obrenović to the throne, Rajović was pardoned and made Prime Minister. Rajović retired from public service in 1869.

Rajović held the honorific title of Kavalir.

Government offices
Preceded by Đorđe Protić	Minister of Internal Affairs; 1840–1842	Succeeded by Toma Vučić Perišić
Preceded by Stevan Magazinović	Prime Minister of Serbia; 1859–1860	Succeeded by Filip Hristić
Preceded by Stevan Magazinović	Minister of Foreign Affairs; 1859–1860	Succeeded by Filip Hristić
