= Vukovići =

Vukovići may refer to:

- Vukovići, Dobretići, a village in Bosnia and Herzegovina
- Vukovići (Hadžići), a village in Bosnia and Herzegovina
- Vukovići, Milići, a village in Milići, Republika Srpska, Bosnia and Herzegovina
- Vukovići, Ravno, a village in Bosnia and Herzegovina
- Vukovići (Trebinje), a village in Bosnia and Herzegovina
- Vukovići, a hamlet of Poljanak, a village in the Plitvička Jezera municipality of Croatia
