= Stevan Magazinović =

Serbian politician

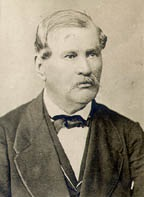

16th Prime Minister of Serbia
- In office 12 June 1858 – 18 April 1859
- Monarchs: Alexander Karađorđević; Miloš Obrenović I
- Preceded by: Stefan Marković
- Succeeded by: Cvetko Rajović

Minister of Internal Affairs
- In office 1 January 1855 – 28 December 1855
- Preceded by: Stevan Knićanin
- Succeeded by: Radovan Damjanović

Personal details
- Born: 1804 Šabac, Sanjak of Smederevo, Ottoman Empire
- Died: 16 February 1874 (aged 69–70) Belgrade, Principality of Serbia
- Occupation: politician, judge

Stevan Magazinović (Serbian Cyrillic: Стеван Магазиновић; Šabac, 1804 — Belgrade 16 February 1874) was a Serbian politician and judge. He was minister and representative of the Prince Miloš Obrenović, at a time when Serbia was an autonomous province within the Ottoman Empire.

== Biography ==
Stevan was born in Šabac in 1804. During the First Serbian Uprising before the Ottoman Turks, he escaped as a child to Ruma, where he grew up and attended school. He returned to Šabac, and since he had lost his father, his mother Marija remarried and changed her name to Magazinović, a surname he later adopted. He first graduated from high school in Ruma and worked in the judiciary as a clerk, learning a profession for several years without pay; his mother supported him all that time. Later, he studied law. Prince Miloš Obrenović selected him as a clerk in the Prince's Office for four years (1829-1833). Magazinović went on to serve in the police with the rank of Major, thanks to his mentor Miloš. In 1852 he became President of the Supreme Court of Serbia, and as an elected member of the Council (Government) from 1854 to 1855 he was Minister of the Interior.

Magazinović was appointed a representative of the Prince on 12 June 1858, at a time when Alexander Karađorđević was forced to abdicate. Magazinović remained in office until 18 April 1859, when Prince Miloš I Obrenović returned to power. During this period, Stevan Magazinović was also Minister of Foreign Affairs of the Principality of Serbia from 31 March 1858 until 30 January 1859, and again from 30 January 1859 until 6 April 1859.

By his last will, Stevan Magazinović left all of his estate including several houses in vineyards to the Serbian state.

== See also ==
- List of prime ministers of Serbia
- Avram Petronijević
- Toma Vučić-Perišić
- Dimitrije Davidović
- Ilija Garašanin
