= Anta Protić =

Writer and secretary to Vujica Vuićević

Antonije Protić Антоније Протић
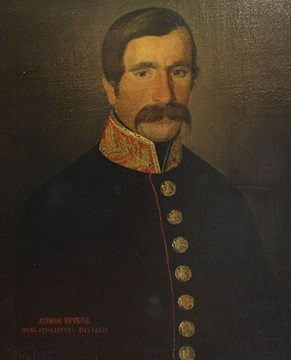

Minister of Finance
- In office 1840–1841
- Preceded by: Cvetko Rajović
- Succeeded by: Pavle Stanišić

Personal details
- Born: 18 April 1787 Smederevo, Ottoman Empire
- Died: 9 December 1854 (aged 67) Smederevo, Principality of Serbia

Antonije "Anta" Protić (1787 in Smederevo, Ottoman Empire – 9 December 1854 in Smederevo, Principality of Serbia) was a writer and secretary to the Duke of Smederevo, Vujica Vulićević, in 1807 during Serbia's plight for emancipation from the Ottoman yoke. Later, he was an Assembly Deputy of Karađorđe in his Governing State Council with scholar Vuk Karadžić. After the Second Serbian Uprising, he was a trustee of finances for the Government of Prince Miloš Obrenović. His memoir is now considered one of four primary sources for Serbia's first and second war of independence.

Anta Protić was popularly known as Ćir-Anta or Kir-Anta, because of his learning and lordship.

== Childhood and schooling ==
Antonije Protić was born on 18 April 1787 in Smederevo. His father was a priest. During Kočina Krajina, his parents fled to Kovin. After the Treaty of Sistova in 1791 that ended the last Austro-Turkish war (1787–91), they returned to Smederevo, but as a plague epidemic broke out soon after, his parents sent him to Skobalj with his uncles. His father died of the plague at that time. He attended Serbian and Greek schools in Smederevo and Krnjevo, so Protić also learned to speak and write Greek and Turkish, the official language of the Ottoman Empire.

== The First Serbian Uprising ==
During the First Serbian Uprising, Antonije Protić w participated in the uprising not only as a scribe but also as an interpreter and soldier. He attended many important events in the First Serbian Uprising, and later in 1853 he wrote Povesnica. He was with Karađorđe during the siege of Smederevo and when the Governing State Council was first established. He knew all the dukes of the First Serbian Uprising and the Second Serbian Uprising. He also took part in the siege and liberation of Belgrade and other important cities and towns. After the collapse of the First Serbian Uprising he fled across the Danube to the Austrian side, and in 1814 he went to Khotyn in Bessarabia where Karađorđe also found sanctuary.

== Negotiator ==
Protić returned to Serbia again and took part in the Second Serbian Uprising. He participated in the negotiations with Marashli Ali Pasha in Ćuprija. During these negotiations, Protić compiled a complaint on behalf of the Serbian people addressed to the Sultan Mahmud II, and in that complaint all crimes of the Turks against the Serbs after the end of the First Serbian Uprising. In addition, he helped to translate this complaint into Turkish. With Marashli Ali Pasha's approval and with his envoys, he left Ćuprija before Reşid Mehmed Pasha, to inform him about the agreement between Marashli Ali Pasha and Miloš Obrenović, and thus to prevent an attack on the insurgents from the Bosnian side. Another insurgent Pavle Cukić was dissatisfied with the peace agreement, which prince Miloš made a deal with Marashli Ali Pasha, so he opposed and exiled himself in the Manasija monastery. Anta Protić helped Pavle Cukić a lot to persuade him to surrender to Prince Miloš, but to no avail.

In 1817, he was Vujica Vulićević's clerk in Smederevo, and at that time he often carried letters from Vujica to Miloš Obrenović and vice versa. He was present at the time when Vujica Veličević had Karađorđe killed. However, he did not even mention this event in his History. Prince Miloš sent him to Ada Kaleh and Vidin during another uprising in 1821 to see what the Turks intended, and on the other hand to convey messages to the Turkish pashas that the Serbs want peace at all cost. Later he was a tax collector in the Požarevac district, and In 1822 he was a customs officer in Smederevo.

== Adviser and Minister of Finance ==
From 1839 he became a member of the first Governing State Council of the Principality of Serbia. Prince Miloš Obrenović left Serbia in 1839 when his son Milan Obrenović took his place, but no sooner after that Prince Milan died. The next prince to take over the rein of the government was Prince Mihailo Obrenović, who was with his father in Wallachia at that time. The governors sent Princess Ljubica Vukomanović and Anta Protić to Wallachia to pick up Prince Mihailo. In November 1839, together with Prince Mihailo, they went from Wallachia to pay homage to the sultan Abdulmejid I and returned from Constantinople only in March 1840. He was minister of finance from 1 September 1840 to May 25, 1841, when he returned to the council. After Toma Vučić-Perišić's revolt, he moved to Austria on 6 September 1842 with Prince Mihailo, but did not stay there long. After returning to Serbia, he lived in Smederevo. Jovan Gavrilović persuaded him to write everything he knew about significant events that happened during his life. That is how his History was created. Protić was a benefactor, who in 1826 donated land for a Smederevo school. He died in Smederevo on 9 December 1854.

== Literary work ==
In 1853, Protić wrote Poveršnica od početka vremena vožda srpskog Karađorđa Petrovića ("The History from the Beginning of the Time of Serbian Grand Vožd Karađorđe Petrović"). He based his work strictly on eyewitness reports and contemporary texts of the period. He is considered one of three primary sources for the first and second Serbian revolution against the Ottoman Empire.

This is what a reviewer wrote at the time:

"Antonije Protić is more of a witness than a historical writer of the 19th century, who understands Karađorđe's epoch as a reflection of the former Serbian glory and state and noting Karađorđe's work - he builds a monument to the spirit that creates both a free people from an enslaved nation and a modern state from pashaluks .... indeed, a commemorative anniversary of the First Serbian Uprising."

Another two publications appeared posthumously entitled Kazivanja o srpskom ustanku 1804 (Tales of the 1804 Serbian Uprising) citing authors Janićije Đurić, Peter Jokić, Gaja Pantelić Vodeničarević, and Ante Protić, and Prićanja savremena o Prvom ustanku ("Contemporary narrations of the First Serbian insurrection") citing authors Janićije Đurić, Petar Jokić and Antonije Protić.

Antonije Protić was buried in the Old Smederevo Cemetery, in the family tomb on the southwest side of the church, at a distance of about 50 meters from the church. The monument is made of red marble, and to the left and right of it are the monuments of his daughters and sons-in-law, the Ugričić and Popović families.

== Sources ==
- Translated and adapted from Serbian Encyclopedia: Антоније Протић
