= Mileta Radojković =

Serbian serdar and judge

Serdar Mileta Radojković
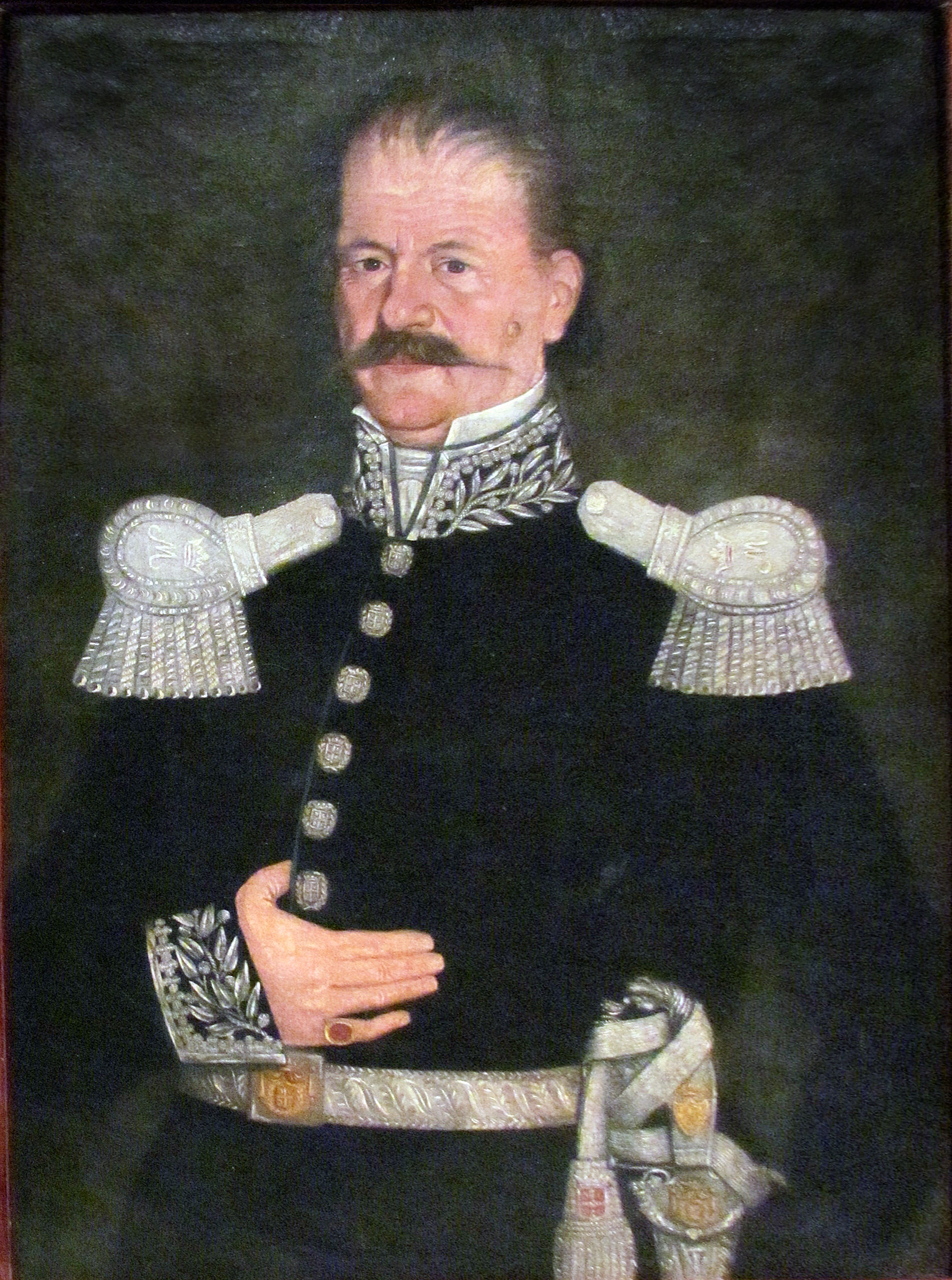
- Born: c. 1778; Đunis, Ottoman Empire
- Died: 26 September 1852 (aged 73–74) Donji Katun, Principality of Serbia
- Allegiance: Revolutionary Serbia; Principality of Serbia

Mileta Radojković, Prince of Jagodina, Grand Count of Rasina (c. 1778 – 26 September 1852) was a participant in the First Serbian Uprising and Second Serbian Uprising, and was the first and most important prince of the Jagodina Nahija and held the title of Serdar Rasinski. He was also an honorary member of the Society of Serbian Letters.

== Biography ==
Radojković's father brought him to Donji Katun as a child where he would grow up. Radojković's ancestors immigrated to Đunis from Kosovo. He was appointed prince of the Jagodina nahija at an assembly held on 19 December 1815, and he remained in this position until 1830.

During this period, he was also a member of the Kragujevac General People's Court and the Belgrade People's Court. When, in October 1823, Prince Miloš Obrenović founded the most important court in the country—the "Municipal Court" in Kragujevac. Mileta Radojković was appointed one of the members of this court. He was in this court until St. George's Day in 1825 when he was transferred to the Belgrade People's Court. He was in the Belgrade General People's Court until July 1826, when he became a member of the General People's Court again. It is known that he was also a member of this court in 1830.

In 1826, Mileta, together with Toma Vučić Perišić, had the greatest merits in quelling the Đakov's revolt. Then Mileta led the cavalry, and Toma the infantry.

In 1826, Prince Miloš Obrenović leased all the ferryboats in Serbia from the Turks, kept the larger one for himself, and leased the others. From 1826 to 1830, Mileta Radojković managed the ferryboat line in Obrež, the busiest ferry in the Jagodina district.

In the summer of 1830, Miloš Obrenović persuaded the people of Jagodina to accuse Mileta of numerous injustices that he allegedly did to them. He also instructed some women and girls in Jagodina to accuse Mileta of adultery. At the end of the trial, Miloš forgave Prince Mileta. Miloš initiated this trial to show Mileta and the other princes that he was the "true master of Serbia". Since then, Mileta stopped supporting Obrenović and become his opponent.

In January 1831, Prince Miloš informed a great national assembly that he had obtained an imperial edict from the Sultan ending all direct obligations of Serbian peasants to their former Turkish lords, guaranteeing Ottoman recognition of Serbian autonomy in most matters of internal administration, and offering Serbia the prospect of territorial aggrandizement, as well as the express right to institute schools, courts, and a governmental administration of her own. The Sultan's decrees of 1830 and 1833 expanded the same rights to a larger territory, and made Serbia a sovereign principality, with Miloš Obrenović as the hereditary prince. A Metropolitanate of Belgrade was established as an autonomous unit of the Patriarchate of Constantinople. Russia's status as the guarantor of Serbia's autonomy was also recognized.

When the Principality of Serbia was divided into Serdars in 1834, Mileta was appointed Grand Duke of the Rasina serdar, one of the five serdars into which the then Serbia was divided.

In 1835, Mileta Radojković led the biggest revolt against Prince Miloš Obrenović, which became popularly known as Mileta's revolt. The rebels rose up with the intention of limiting the prince's power by imposing a new constitution. The prince was forced to adopt the Sretenje Constitution (La Constitution de la Sainte Rencontre de 1835) in Kragujevac, the then capital of Serbia, which limited the prince's rights and partially transferred them to the State Council. By the Constitution of Sretenje, Mileta was appointed one of the five ministers in Serbia - the Minister of War ("Guardian of Military Affairs") and thus became a member of the State Council, which played the role of the government of the Principality of Serbia. However, Miloš with the support of foreign powers soon dismissed all the ministers he had appointed by the Constitution of Sretenje, so that Mileta was replaced on 16 March of the same year. The move was opposed by neighbouring Austria, the ruling Ottoman Empire and Imperial Russia. It is believed that the three great empires saw the Sretenje Constitution as a danger to their own autocratic systems of government. Metternich's Austria particularly ridiculed the fact that Serbia had its own flag and foreign ministry. Miloš abolished the constitution at the demand of Russia and Turkey, and it was replaced by the "Turkish" Constitution of 1838.

When the older Constitution (the "Turkish Constitution") was re-enacted in the Principality of Serbia in 1838, Miloš Obrenović appointed seventeen members of the Council and the Grand Court, including Mileta Radojković. On June 11, 1842, he became an honorary member of the Society Of Serbian Letters.

During the First Serbian Uprising, as the Nahija prince Mileta, he renovated the Monastery of Saint Nikola Mirlikijski in Svojnovo. He built today's church and today's old eastern residence from the remains of the destroyed monastery.

Mileta Radojković died on September 26, 1852. He was buried in Varvarin next to the Church of the Holy Mother of God.

== Legacy ==
The street in Belgrade in the municipality of Stari grad was named after him - Knez Miletina Street, and also a street in Jagodina is named after him.

== See also ==
- List of Serbian Revolutionaries
