= Naupara Monastery =

Monastery in Serbia

Coordinates: 43°28′39″N 21°18′37″E

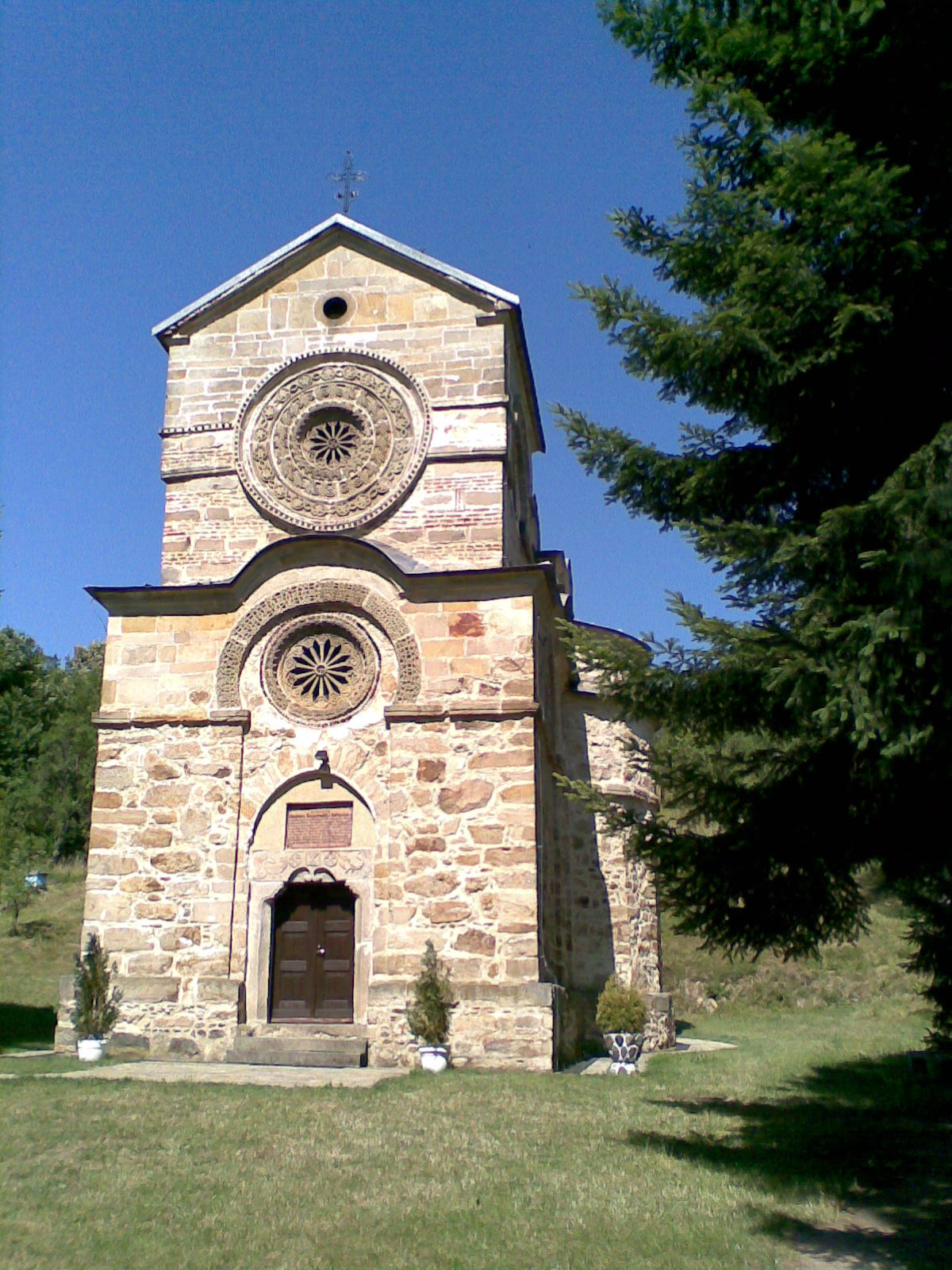

Naupara monastery is a Serbian Orthodox Christian monastery situated 12 km south of the city of Kruševac and about 210 km from Belgrade. The original building was completed in 1391 but was severely destroyed by Turks in 1454. It was not restored until 1835 when brothers Stojan Simić and Aleksa Simić took on the project. They offered the church a bell, sacred books, and other religious items upon its completion. Naupara is built in the Serbian architectural style of the Morava school and was constructed in the same style as the Lazarica Church. The paintings and iconostasis within the monastery date to the 19th century since the original frescos were ruined during the restoration. Today, Naupara is an active nunnery, with a small number of nuns who tend to the land.

== See also ==
- List of Serbian Orthodox monasteries
