= Tenka Stefanović =

Serbian politician

Stefan Stefanović Стефан Стефановић Тенка
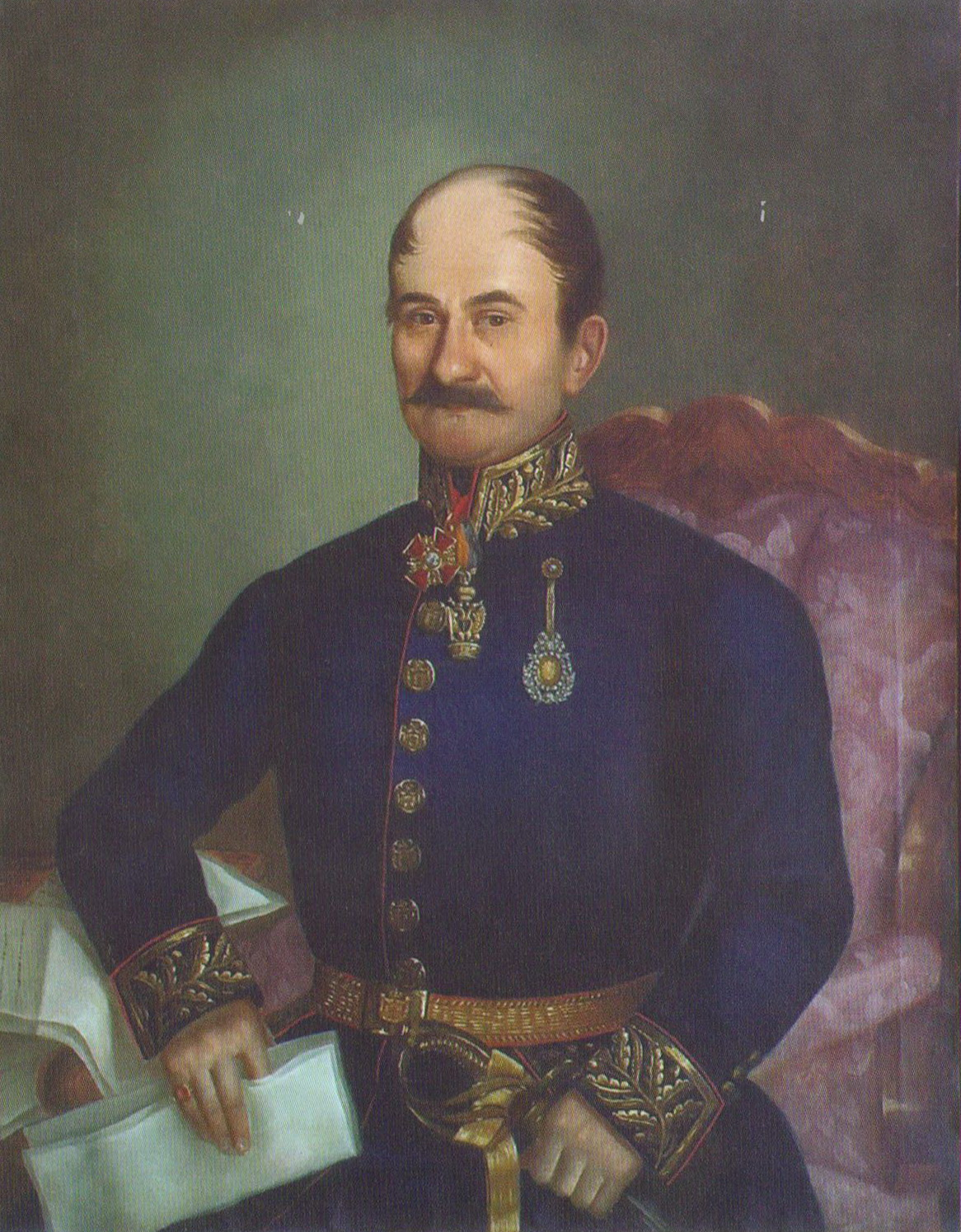

Representative of the Prince of Serbia
- Acting
- In office 28 March 1836 – 26 February 1839
- Monarch: Miloš I
- Preceded by: Koca Marković
- Succeeded by: Avram Petronijević

Minister of Education
- In office 3 August 1848 – 22 March 1848
- Preceded by: Aleksa Janković
- Succeeded by: Lazar Arsenijević Batalaka
- In office 11 June 1838 – 17 May 1840
- Preceded by: Dimitrije Davidović
- Succeeded by: Lazar Teodorović

Personal details
- Born: 1797 Donji Milanovac, Ottoman Empire
- Died: 2 September 1865 (aged 67–68) Belgrade, Principality of Serbia
- Occupation: politician, diplomat
- Awards: Order of the Iron Crown; Order of Saint Anna; Order of Glory

Stefan Stefanović (Serbian Cyrillic: Стефан Стефановић; 1797–1865), known as Tenka (Тенка), was a Serbian politician who served as the Prime Minister of Serbia. Stefanović was a leader of pro-Obrenović group that conspired against Prince Alexander Karađorđević. As a result, in 1840, Tenka Stefanović was forced to join a group of Constitutionalists (Toma Vučić-Perišić, Avram Petronijević, Milutin Garašanin and his two sons Luka and Ilija Garašanin, Stojan Simić, Matija Nenadović, Lazar Teodorović) who were sent in exile to Constantinople.

Government offices
Preceded by Koca Marković	Prime Minister of Serbia; 1836–1839	Succeeded by Avram Petronijević
Preceded by Lazar Teodorović	Minister of Justice; 1839–1840	Succeeded by Lazar Teodorović
Preceded by Aleksa Janković	Minister of Justice; 1848	Succeeded by Lazar Arsenijević
