= Filip Hristić =

Serbian politician

Filip Hristić Филип Христић
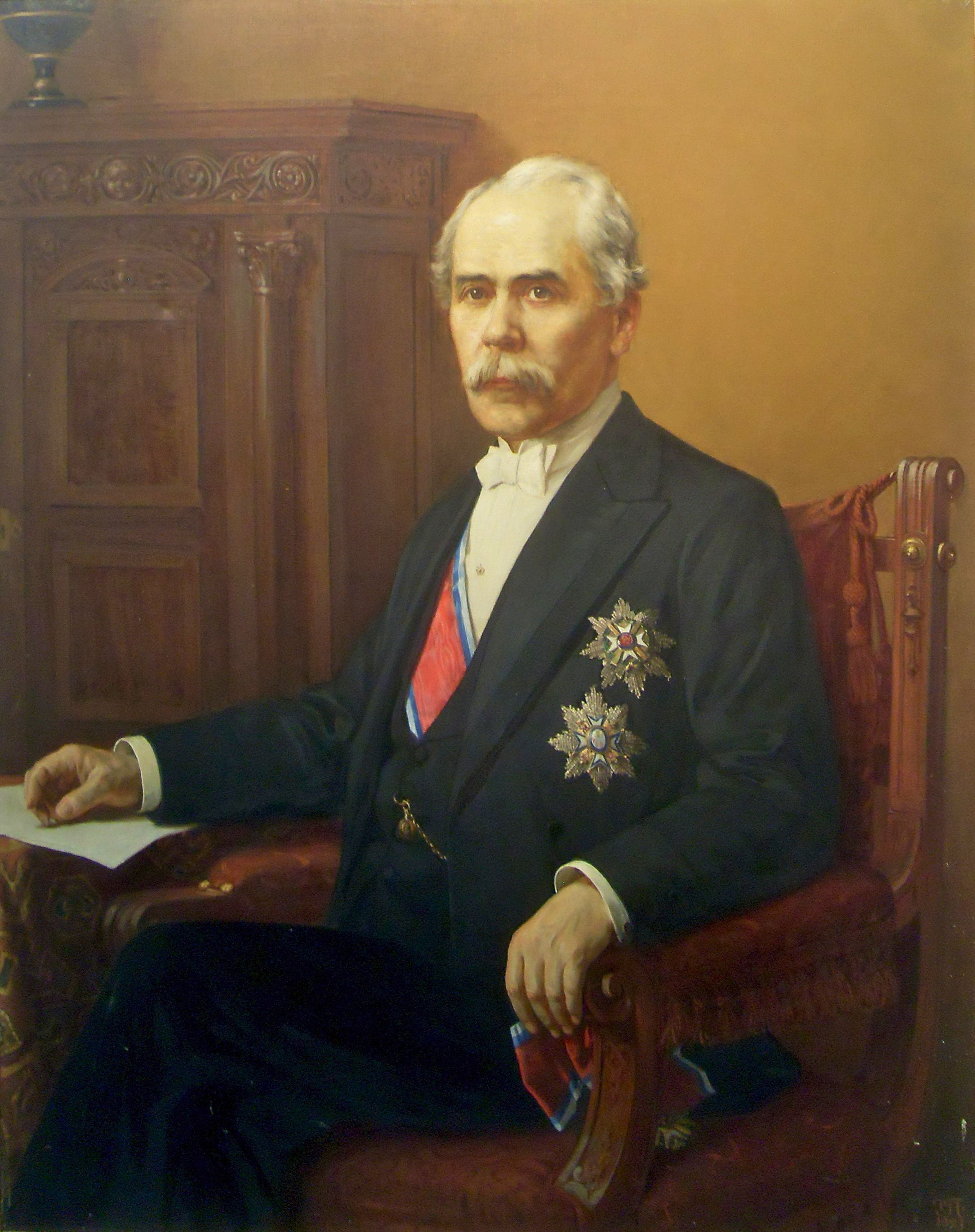

18th Prime Minister of Serbia
- In office 8 November 1860 – 21 October 1861
- Preceded by: Cvetko Rajović
- Succeeded by: Ilija Garašanin (as President of the Ministry)

Personal details
- Born: 27 March 1819 Belgrade, Principality of Serbia
- Died: 11 February 1905 (aged 85) Menton, France
- Profession: Economist, Diplomat
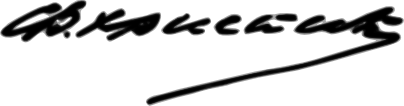
- Signature

Filip Hristić (Serbian Cyrillic: Филип Христић; 27 March 1819, Belgrade – 29 January 1905, Menton, France) was a Serbian politician serving as the Prime Minister of Serbia, Minister of Foreign Affairs, Minister of Education, Governor of the National Bank, and ambassador of Serbia in the Ottoman Empire, Austrian Empire, German Empire and United Kingdom.

== Life ==
=== Early ===
Filip Hristić was born on 15 March 1819 (Old Style). He was the son of Karađorđe's lieutenant Hrista Đorđević, originally from Samokov.

Since he lost his father at an early age, Filip Hristić was adopted, lived and studied with the Serbian Metropolitan Melentije Pavlović, who was the brother of the uncle of Toma Vučić-Perišić. He continued his education as a companion of the sons of Prince Miloš Obrenović, Milan and Mihailo. In Belgrade, he graduated from the Lyceum in 1836, and continued his education with a state scholarship abroad in Vienna and Paris, at The Sorbonne, he was granted Ph.D. in law.

=== Public service ===
Hristić was hired in public administration at the end of the reign of Prince Aleksandar Karađorđevic, as commissioner of the Danube Commission. He also became a member of Council and, after returning of Prince Miloš Obrenović to power, became his personal secretary (1858–1860).

Under the Prince Prince Mihailo Obrenović, Hristić was the Prime Minister and Minister of Foreign Affairs from 27 October 1860 to 9 December 1861. It was the attempt of settling political parties. During the time of the Hristić government, the basic laws of Mihailo's rule were adopted. At the end of 1861, Prince Mihailo decided to adopt conservative politics and replaces Hristić with Ilija Garašanin, and Hristić was returned to the council.

After the Turkish bombing of Serbian cities (1862), Hristić was sent, together with Princess Julia, at the end of January 1863, on a mission to London in order to draw attention to Serbian affairs. In March 1863, Lord Palmerston warned him that England would not permit Serbia to fight Turkey. He was permanent Extraordinary Minister Plenipotentiary of Serbia in Constantinople from 1871 until 1873. After that, he was Minister of Education in the government of Jovan Marinović from 22 October 1873 to 25 November 1874. In October 1875, he was sent to Prince Nikola I of Montenegro to discuss the co-operation in events of the war against the Ottoman Empire. In November 1875, he promised, in the name of Serbia, that it would aid Montenegro in any case of conflict, which risk had been greater since the Herzegovina Uprising 1852–1862 when both Serbia and Montenegro sent aid to the rebels in East Herzegovina. At the end of first Serbian-Turkish War in 1877, Hristić was a delegate of Serbia during the conclusion of peace. He was representative of Serbia in Constantinople, Vienna and London from 1878 to 1883. After that, he was Governor of the National Bank of the Kingdom of Serbia from 1885 to 1890.

Hristić was a member of the Society Of Serbian Letters from 1846, member of the Serbian Learned Society from 29 July 1864 and an honorary member of the Serbian Royal Academy from 10 February 1892.

== Family ==
Filip Hristić married Danica Hadži-Toma, daughter of wholesaler and millionaire from Belgrade Hadži-Toma (Opulos), Greek by origin.

Son of Filip Hristić, Milan Hristić, was Secretary of Embassy of the Kingdom of Serbia in Constantinople. Milan Hristić was first married to Artemiza Joanides, Greek woman from Constantinople and they had three children. In the second marriage, he married Polish noblewoman and lived and died in a castle near Kraków.

Former daughter in law of Filip Hristić, Artemiza Hristić (née Joanides), was the mother of the son of King Milan Obrenović, George, who was born out of wedlock and was adopted by Count Ziči. Djordje, at one point, after the death of his brother, King Alexander Obrenović showed claims to the Serbian throne.

== See also ==
- List of prime ministers of Serbia

Government offices
Preceded by Cvetko Rajović	Prime Minister of Serbia; 1860–1861	Succeeded by Ilija Garašanin
Preceded by Cvetko Rajović	Minister of Foreign Affairs; 1860–1861	Succeeded by Ilija Garašanin
Preceded by Aleksa Spasić	Governor of the National Bank of Serbia; 1895–1900	Succeeded by Đorđe Vajfert
