= Milutin Savić =

Serbian revolutionary

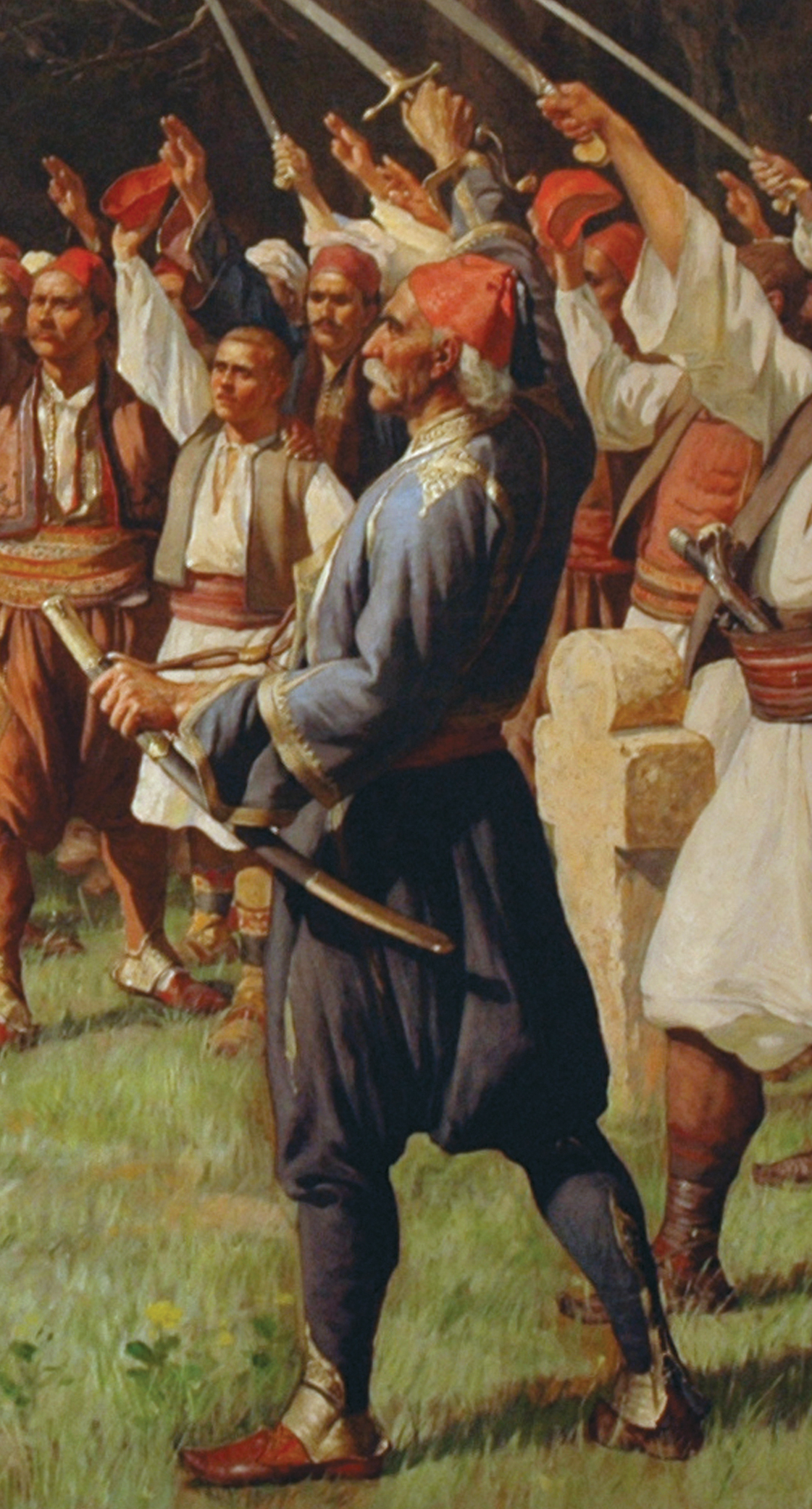
- Milutin Garašanin
- Born: 1762; Garaši (modern Serbia)
- Died: 1842 (80 years old); Barajevo (modern Serbia)
- Military career
- Allegiance: (Serbia) Serbian revolutionaries
- Service years: 1804–15
- Rank: obor-knez
- Nickname: Garašanin
- Conflicts: First Serbian Uprising (1813); Second Serbian Uprising (1815)

Hadži Milutin Savić Garašanin (Serbian Cyrillic: Милутин Савић Гарашанин; 1762–1842) was a Serbian revolutionary, obor-knez of Jasenica, and member of the National Council under Miloš Obrenović. He is the father of Ilija Garašanin and grandfather of Milutin Garašanin (1845-1898), one of the founders and leaders of Serbian Progressive Party.

== Life ==
Savić was born in the village of Garaši, south of Belgrade. His father Sava "Saviša" Bošković settled in Garaši from Bjelopavlići (in Montenegro). His paternal great-grandfather Vukašin Bošković was a knez of the Bošković brotherhood in Bjelopavlići.

He participated in the Freikorp of the Austrian Army in the Koča's frontier, in the same unit as Karađorđe.

== See also ==
- List of Serbian Revolutionaries
- Avram Petronijević
- Toma Vučić-Perišić
- Dimitrije Davidović
- Aleksa Simić
- Ilija Garašanin
