= Aleksa Simić =

Prime Minister of Serbia

Aleksa Simić Алекса Симић
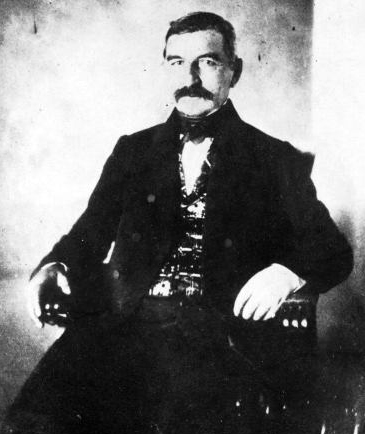

Representative of the Prince of Serbia
- In office 28 September 1856 – 1 July 1857
- Monarch: Alexander I
- Preceded by: Stefan Marković
- Succeeded by: Stefan Marković
- In office 26 March 1853 – 28 December 1855
- Preceded by: Ilija Garašanin
- Succeeded by: Aleksa Janković
- In office 6 October 1843 – 11 October 1844
- Preceded by: Avram Petronijević
- Succeeded by: Avram Petronijević

Personal details
- Born: 8 March 1800 Boljevci, Sanjak of Smederevo, Ottoman Empire
- Died: 17 March 1872 (aged 72) Belgrade, Principality of Serbia

Aleksa Simić (Boljevci, March 18, 1800 – Belgrade, March 17, 1872) was a Serbian politician and diplomat who thrice served as Prime Minister of the Principality of Serbia and held a number of other ministerial posts from the 1830s through the 1850s.

== Biography ==
Simić was a part of the Ustavobranioci group, known as the Defenders of the Constitution.

Aleksa first came to the Principality of Serbia from Srem, then a Habsburg-occupied territory, in 1819. He was hired as a clerk in the office of Prince Miloš Obrenović. In 1835, Simić becomes the Minister of Finance, and in 1842 he served as Prince Miloš's diplomatic envoy in negotiations with the Ottomans at Constantinople. In 1843 he becomes the Minister of Foreign Affairs of the Principality of Serbia.

His older brother, Stojan Simić, was also a politician and a businessman. Both brothers owed to Miloš Obrenović their rise from humble beginnings to great wealth and power. His nephew was Đorđe Simić, who held the post of Prime Minister of Serbia.

== See also ==
- List of prime ministers of Serbia
- Avram Petronijević
- Toma Vučić-Perišić
- Dimitrije Davidović
- Ilija Garašanin

Government offices
Preceded by Koca Marković	Minister of Finance of Serbia; 1835–1840	Succeeded by Cvetko Rajović
Preceded by Tenka Stefanović	Prime Minister of Serbia; 1839–1840	Succeeded by Paun Janković
Preceded by Đorđe Protić	Prime Minister of Serbia; 1842–1843	Succeeded by Aleksa Simić
Preceded by Stevan Marković	Prime Minister of Serbia; 1856–1857	Succeeded by Stevan Marković
Preceded by Aleksa Janković	Minister of Foreign Affairs; 1843–1844	Succeeded by Avram Petronijević
Preceded by Lazar Arsenijević	Minister of Education of Serbia; 1849–1852	Succeeded by Lazar Arsenijević
Preceded by Lazar Arsenijević	Minister of Justice of Serbia; 1849–1852	Succeeded by Lazar Arsenijević
Preceded by Aleksandar Nenadović	Minister of Internal Affairs; 1858–1859	Succeeded by Aleksandar Nenadović
Preceded by Ilija Garašanin	Minister of Foreign Affairs; 1853–1855	Succeeded by Aleksa Janković
Preceded by Stevan Marković	Minister of Foreign Affairs; 1856–1857	Succeeded by Stevan Marković
