= Lazar Teodorović =

Ottoman politician, diplomat and polyglot (1771–1846)

Lazar Teodorović Лазар Теодоровић
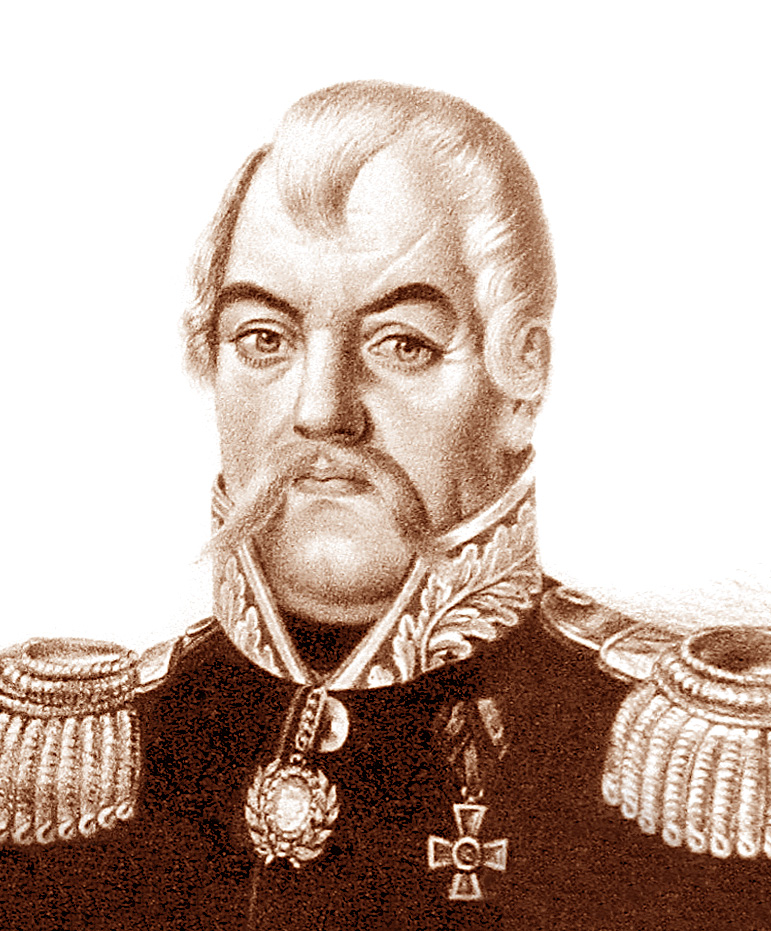

Minister of Education
- In office 17 May 1840 – 17 June 1840
- Preceded by: Tenka Stefanović
- Succeeded by: Golub Petrović
- In office 8 April 1834 – 1834
- Preceded by: Office established
- Succeeded by: Dimitrije Davidović

Commissioner of Justice
- In office 1840
- Preceded by: Tenka Stefanović
- Succeeded by: Golub Petrović
- In office 1834–1839
- Preceded by: Office established
- Succeeded by: Tenka Stefanović

Personal details
- Born: 1771 Kaona, Ottoman Empire
- Died: 1 February 1846 (aged 74–75) Constantinople, Ottoman Empire
- Occupation: politician, diplomat
- Awards: Order of Glory

Lazar Teodorović (1771 in Kaona, Ottoman Empire – 1 February 1846, in Constantinople, Ottoman Empire) was a politician, diplomat and polyglot. He was perhaps one of the most educated people in Serbia in the early nineteenth century. He also distinguished himself as a voivode in the first Serbian revolution of independence in 1804.

== Biography ==
Born in Kaona in the Šabac nahiya of the Sanjak of Smederevo (now in Serbia). His father was a wealthy merchant in Svileuva. His father sent him to the best school in Sremski Karlovci. There, Lazar graduated from Gymnasium and went on to study philosophy and jurisprudence in Szeged. Besides Serbian, he spoke Turkish, German, French, Latin and Russian. He was the son-in-law of Luka Lazarević. With his second wife, sister of Dimitrije Crnobarac, they had one daughter who was married Professor Vladimir Jakšić of Republic Hydrometeorological Institute of Serbia fame and son of Jakov Jakšić.

During the First Serbian Uprising, he was a commander of the Šabac region and worked as a scribe in the office of Prince Jakov Nenadović (1804-1813). After the defeat at Ravnje (August 1813) and suppression of the uprising, Teodorović, like many other leaders (voivodes), left Serbia. The Austrians escorted him to Judenburg in Styria, from where he then left for the Russian Empire, where he wrote Karađorđe's Protocol of letters, reports, and petitions to Alexander I, the Russian emperor, and his ministers and emissaries Ioannis Kapodistrias, Karl Nesselrode, Kozodovlev, Bahmatiev Ivelich in 1816 and 1817 in St. Petersburg. When the Second Serbian Uprising was in progress, he returned to Serbia and was at the disposal of Prince Miloš Obrenović, who appointed him a clerk in his office in Kragujevac, then the official capital of Serbia. He was engaged in diplomatic activities and was sent by the prince to Constantinople as a People's Deputy in 1827. He made steady progress in service until he became a member of the State Council in Serbia in 1839. During the reign of Prince Alexander Karađorđević, he was a member of the district administration and the court in Šabac, the Minister of Justice and Education and the Serbian ambassador (kapućehaja) to Constantinople.

He died after a brief illness on 1 February 1846 in Constantinople, where he was buried next to the Church of Saint Petka. Many years later, his remains were transferred to Novo groblje in Belgrade.

He was an honorary member of the Society Of Serbian Letters.

== See also ==
- List of Serbian Revolutionaries
