= Stefan Marković (politician) =

Serbian politician

Stefan Marković Стефан Марковић
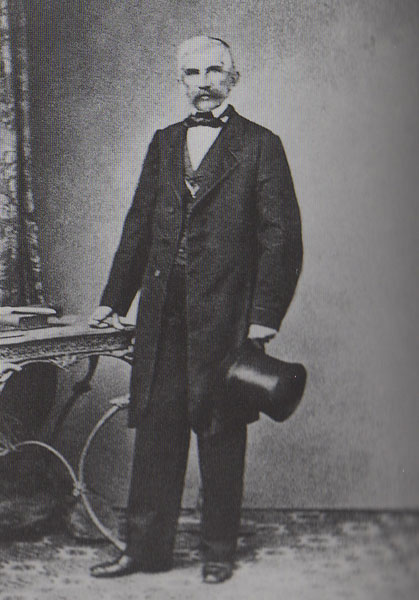

15th Prime Minister of Serbia
- In office 1 July 1857 – 12 June 1858
- Monarch: Alexander I
- Preceded by: Aleksa Simić
- Succeeded by: Stevan Magazinović

Prime Minister of Serbia
- Acting
- In office 10 June 1856 – 28 September 1856
- Monarch: Alexander I
- Preceded by: Aleksa Janković
- Succeeded by: Aleksa Simić

Personal details
- Born: 26 July 1804 Zemun, Habsburg monarchy
- Died: 29 November 1864 (aged 60) Vienna, Austrian Empire
- Occupation: politician

Stefan Marković (Serbian Cyrillic: Стефан Марковић, 26 July 1804 – 29 November 1864) was a Serbian politician who served as the 15th Prime Minister of Serbia during the reign of Alexander Karađorđević, from 1857 to 1858.

== Biography ==
Marković was born in Zemun and finished elementary school in the town in 1815, and high school in Sremski Karlovci in 1821. He studied at a university in Austria, and in 1834 he moved to Serbia.

In 1834 he came to live in Kragujevac, then the capital of Serbia. He was a member of the government and the secretary of the Prime Minister's Office from 1835; director of the Prince's Office from 28 September 1837; principal secretary of the Privy Council from 1839; member of the council from 1842 to 1857; Minister of Justice and Minister of Education from 21 December 1854 to 29 May 1856; acting minister for foreign affairs from 29 May to 16 September 1856; minister of justice and education from 16 September 1856 to 19 June 1857; and again minister for foreign affairs from 19 June 1857 to 31 March 1858.

Marković was one of the first members of ”Društvo Srpske slovesnosti," or also known as "Serbian Literary Society."

With the return to power of Prince Miloš Obrenović, Marković, knowing that his political career was over, left the country in 1858 never to return.

Stefan Marković died in Vienna in 1864.

== See also ==
- List of prime ministers of Serbia

Government offices
Preceded by Aleksa Janković	Minister of Education of Serbia; 1855–1856	Succeeded by Dimitrije Crnobarac
Preceded by Aleksa Janković	Minister of Justice of Serbia; 1855	Succeeded by Dimitrije Crnobarac
Preceded by Aleksa Janković	Minister of Foreign Affairs; 1856	Succeeded by Aleksa Simić
Preceded by Aleksa Janković	Prime Minister of Serbia; 1856	Succeeded by Aleksa Simić
Preceded by Dimitrije Crnobarac	Minister of Education of Serbia; 1856–1857	Succeeded by Jeremija Stanojević
Preceded by Dimitrije Crnobarac	Minister of Justice of Serbia; 1856–1857	Succeeded by Jeremija Stanojević
Preceded by Aleksa Simić	Prime Minister of Serbia; 1857–1858	Succeeded by Stevan Magazinović
Preceded by Aleksa Simić	Minister of Foreign Affairs; 1857–1858	Succeeded by Stevan Magazinović
