= Skobalj (Smederevo) =

Skobalj Скобаљ
- Village (Selo)
- Location within Serbia
- Coordinates: 44°33′31″N 21°01′54″E
- Country: Serbia
- District: Podunavlje District
- Municipality: Smederevo

Population (2022)
  - Total: 1,397
- Time zone: UTC+1 (CET)
  - Summer (DST): UTC+2 (CEST)

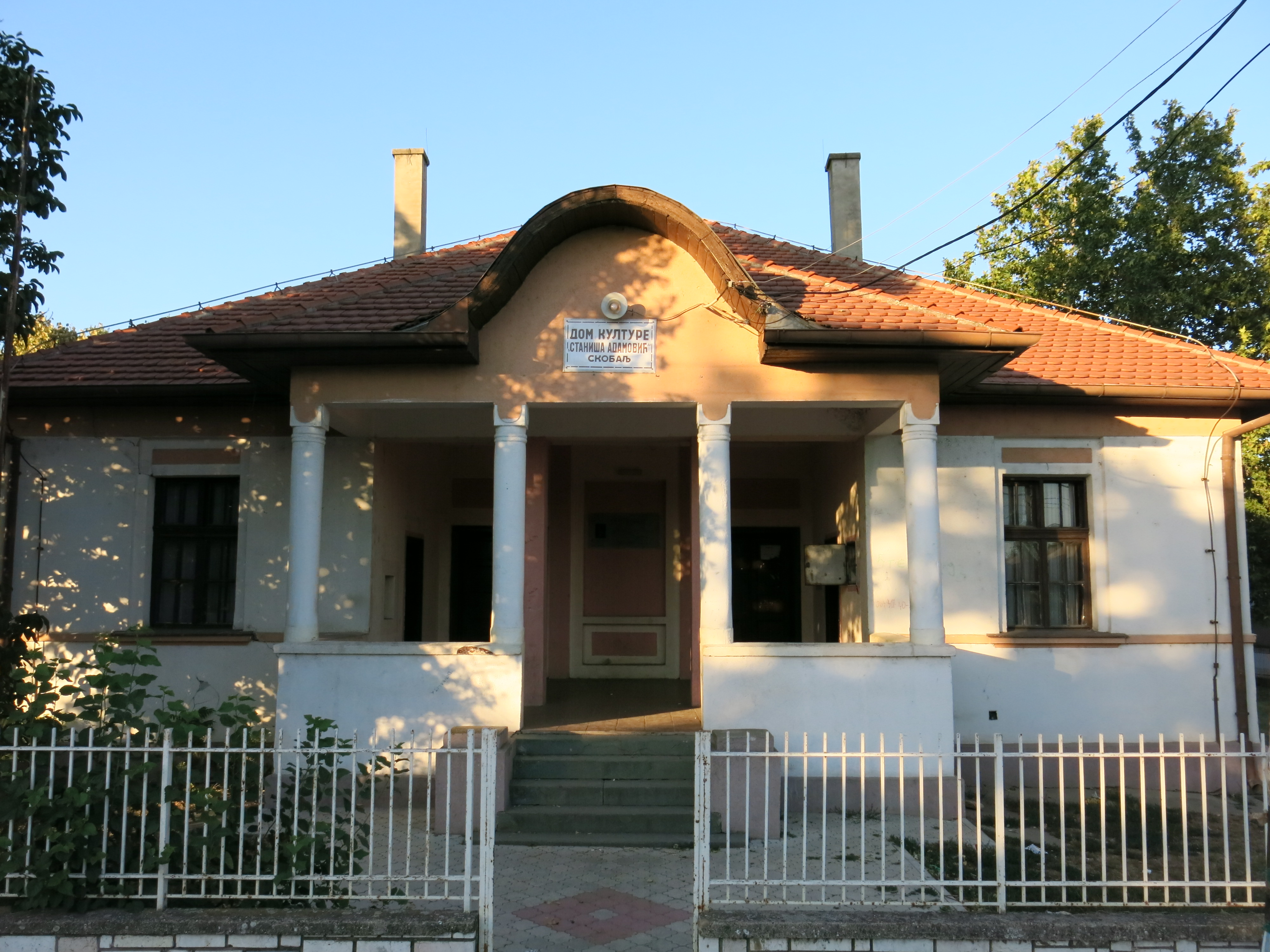
Skobalj, Cultural center

Skobalj is a village in the municipality of Smederevo, Serbia. According to the 2002 census, the village has a population of 1880 people.

Skobalj, being very small village, is mostly known as a birthplace of Dafina Milanović, founder of Dafiment Bank, who committed one of the largest Ponzi scheme monetary fraud in former Yugoslavia.
