= Stojan Simić =

Serbian politician (1797–1852)

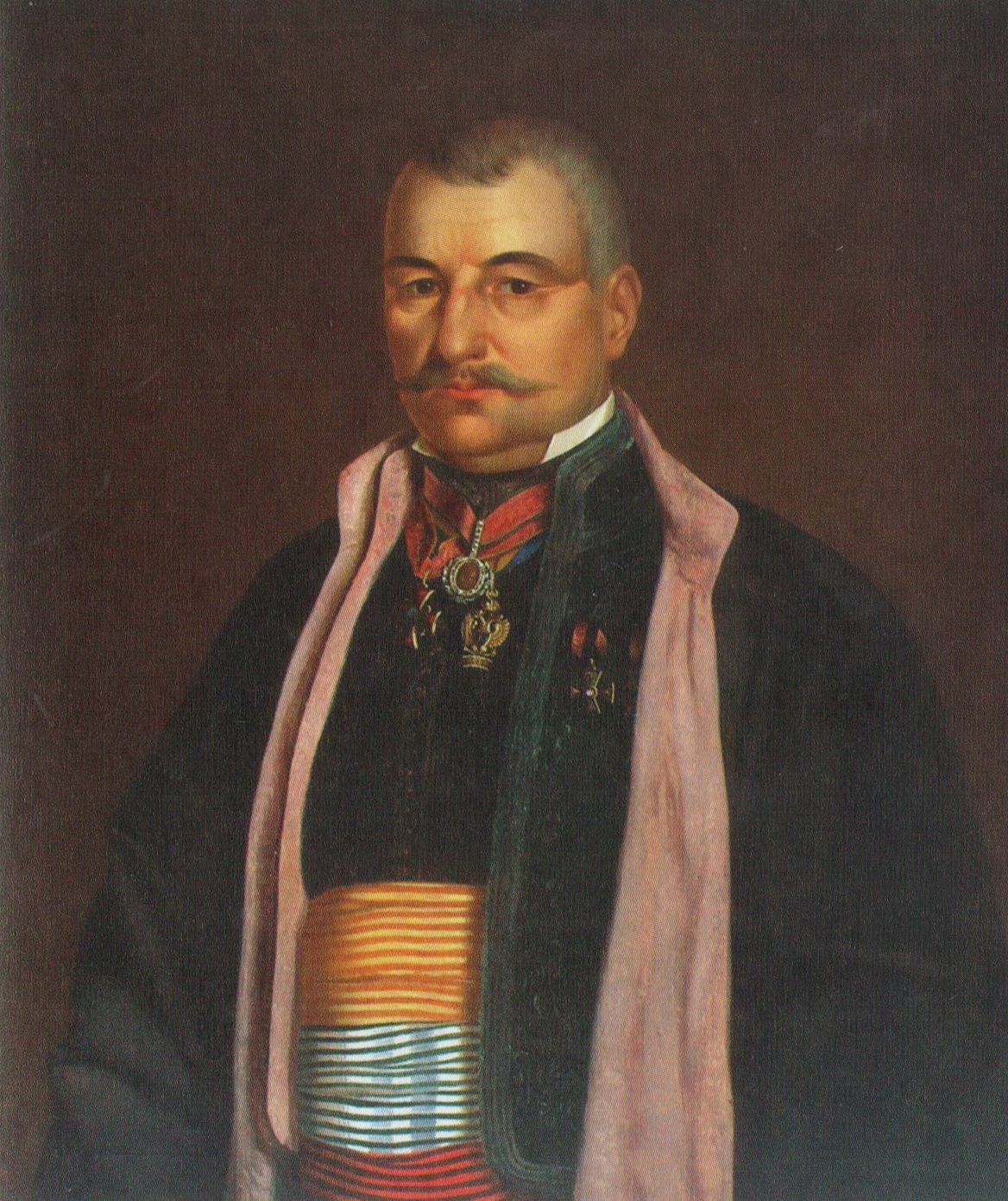
- Portrait of Simić by Uroš Knežević
- Born: 25 March 1797; Boljevci, Sanjak of Smederevo, Ottoman Empire
- Died: 10 March 1852 (aged 54); Belgrade, Principality of Serbia
- Awards: Order of Glory; Order of the Iron Crown; Order of Saint Anna

Stojan Simić (Boljevci, 25 March 1797 – Belgrade, Principality of Serbia, 10 March 1852) was a Serbian politician and businessman. He was known as a talented speaker and constitutional defender.

== Biography ==
=== Early political life ===
Simić and his younger brother Aleksa Simić were influential in Serbian politics during the first half of the 19th century. Together, they gave financial support for cultural and literary projects. Their father, Đorđe Simić, was a captain of the Rasina under Karađorđe during the First Serbian Uprising.

As representative of the newly liberated Serbia at Constantinople, Simić transcribed all of the Sultan's edicts (Hatišerif) relating to Serbia in three languages: Serbian, French, and Turkish. The work he did there served as a basis for the elaboration of the public law of the Principality of Serbia. Simić suggested he fought for "the free will of the people", and objected to autocracy, oligarchy, and authoritarianism.

=== Legacy ===
Simić received a golden bull from the Ravanica monastery. He used this in Walachia to assist with the establishment of the Belgrade's Velika škola. Simić also had a palace built in the center of Belgrade, which housed the Serbian court from 1842 to 1903, when King Alexander and Queen Draga were assassinated. In 1903, the building was demolished. A new royal palace was built on the same site. The portrait of Simić by Uroš Knežević is currently in the National Museum of Belgrade.

== Brother ==
Stojan's brother Aleksa Simić headed the customs administration (as bazrdjanbača) and performed a variety of functions in the field of culture. At the same time, he served as an intermediary between Prince Miloš and the Turkish authorities in Belgrade. Aleksa Simić also participated in the founding of the Gligorije Vozarević bookstore, the first bookstore in Belgrade. This library formed the basis for the National Library of Serbia.

The brothers jointly restored the medieval Naupara monastery, built c. 1381, which was demolished by the Turks in 1454, and remained in ruins until 1835. When the restoration was over, the brothers offered the church a bell, sacred books, and other objects necessary for religious ceremonies.
