= Vukovići, Dobretići =

Vukovići
- Village
- Location within Bosnia and Herzegovina
- Coordinates: 44.3669028°N 17.4634624°E
- Country: Bosnia and Herzegovina
- Entity: Federation of Bosnia and Herzegovina
- Canton: Central Bosnia
- Municipality: Dobretići

Area
  - Total: 3.77 sq mi (9.77 km^{2})

Population (2013)
  - Total: 64
  - Density: 17/sq mi (6.6/km^{2})
- Time zone: UTC+1 (CET)
  - Summer (DST): UTC+2 (CEST)

Vukovići is a village in the municipality of Dobretići, Central Bosnia Canton, Bosnia and Herzegovina.

== Demographics ==
According to the 2013 census, its population was 64, all Croats.
