= Garaši =

- Village
- Interactive map of Garaši
- Location within Serbia
- Coordinates: 44°17′N 20°28′E
- Country: Serbia
- District: Šumadija
- Municipality: Aranđelovac

Population (2002)
  - Total: 605
- Time zone: UTC+1 (CET)
  - Summer (DST): UTC+2 (CEST)

Garaši (Serbian: Гараши) is a village in the municipality of Aranđelovac, Serbia. According to the 2002 census, the village has a population of 605 people.

The village was active in the Serbian Revolution, being organized into the knežina (administrative unit) of Kačer during the First Serbian Uprising (1804–13). Milutin Savić (1762–1842), obor-knez (mayor) of Jasenica under Miloš Obrenović, came from Garaši.
