= Dimitrije Davidović =

Serbian politician and writer

- Димитрије Давидовић
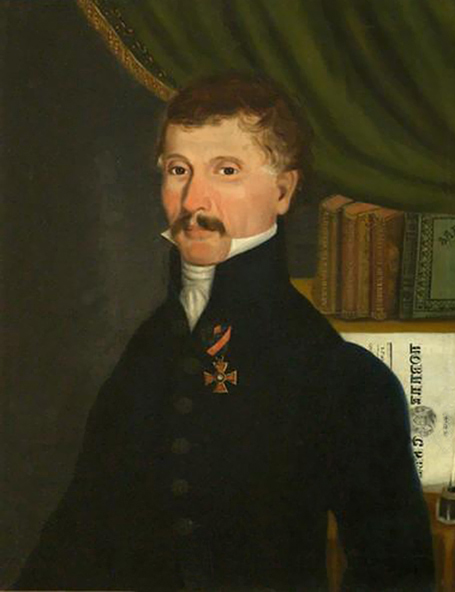
- Portrait of Davidović, 1834

8th Prime Minister of Serbia
- In office 1826–1829
- Monarch: Miloš I
- Preceded by: Miloje Todorović
- Succeeded by: Koca Marković

Minister of Education
- In office 1834 – 28 March 1835
- Preceded by: Lazar Teodorović
- Succeeded by: Tenka Stefanović

Personal details
- Born: 12 October 1789 Zemun, Habsburg Monarchy (now Serbia)
- Died: 24 March 1838 (aged 48) Smederevo, Serbia
- Awards: Order of Saint Vladimir
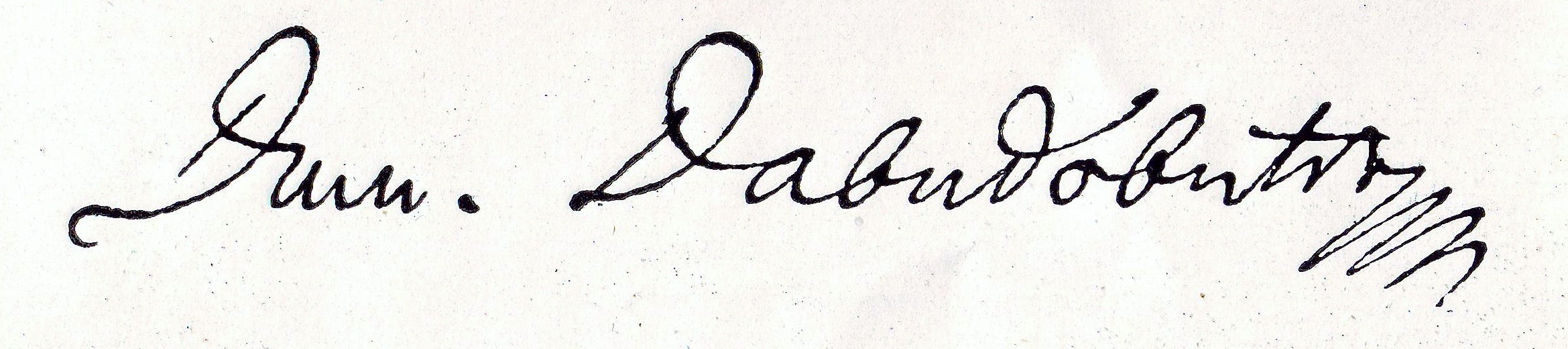
- Signature

Dimitrije Davidović (12 October 1789 – 24 March 1838) was a Serbian politician serving as the Prime Minister of Serbia, Minister of Education and chief secretary of cabinet to Prince Miloš Obrenović I. He was also a writer, philosopher, journalist, publisher, historian, diplomat and the founder of modern Serbian journalism and publishing.

== Early life ==
Dimitrije Davidović, born in Zemun on 12 October 1789, was the son of Gavrilo and Marija Georgijević. In 1789 his father, a regiment priest of the Serbian Orthodox Church in the Austrian Army, was transferred to Zemun after the taking of the area from the Ottoman Empire.

His grandfather, Very Rev. David Georgijević, was a professor at the famed Latin School (Latinska škola) at Sremski Karlovci, founded by Metropolitan Pavle Nenadović of the Serbian Orthodox Church. Dimitrije was a sickly child and as such was inclined to read and write instead of playing outdoors. He completed Serbian grammar school in Zemun and the Protestant lyceum of Kežmarok, and his post-secondary education, at Sremski Karlovci, was guided by his professor of Latin, his paternal grandfather Georgijević. From there he then went to the universities of Pest and Vienna, where he first studied philosophy then switched over to the University of Vienna's prestigious School of Medicine.

He was early involved in the political troubles in which Serbia and the Serbian people were then immersed with the Ottoman authorities in Istanbul. Dimitrije decided one day to take his grandfather's given name "David" as his surname "Davidović" to avoid detection by the authorities who were looking for him at the time.

The First Serbian Uprising, led by Karađorđe Petrović, started in 1804 but could not survive beyond 1813 without the support of the Great Powers. Soon, came the Second Serbian Uprising under Miloš Obrenović I, Prince of Serbia in 1815 which gained nominal concessions from the sultan of Constantinople, thanks to the intervention of Imperial Russia.

== Publishing pioneer ==
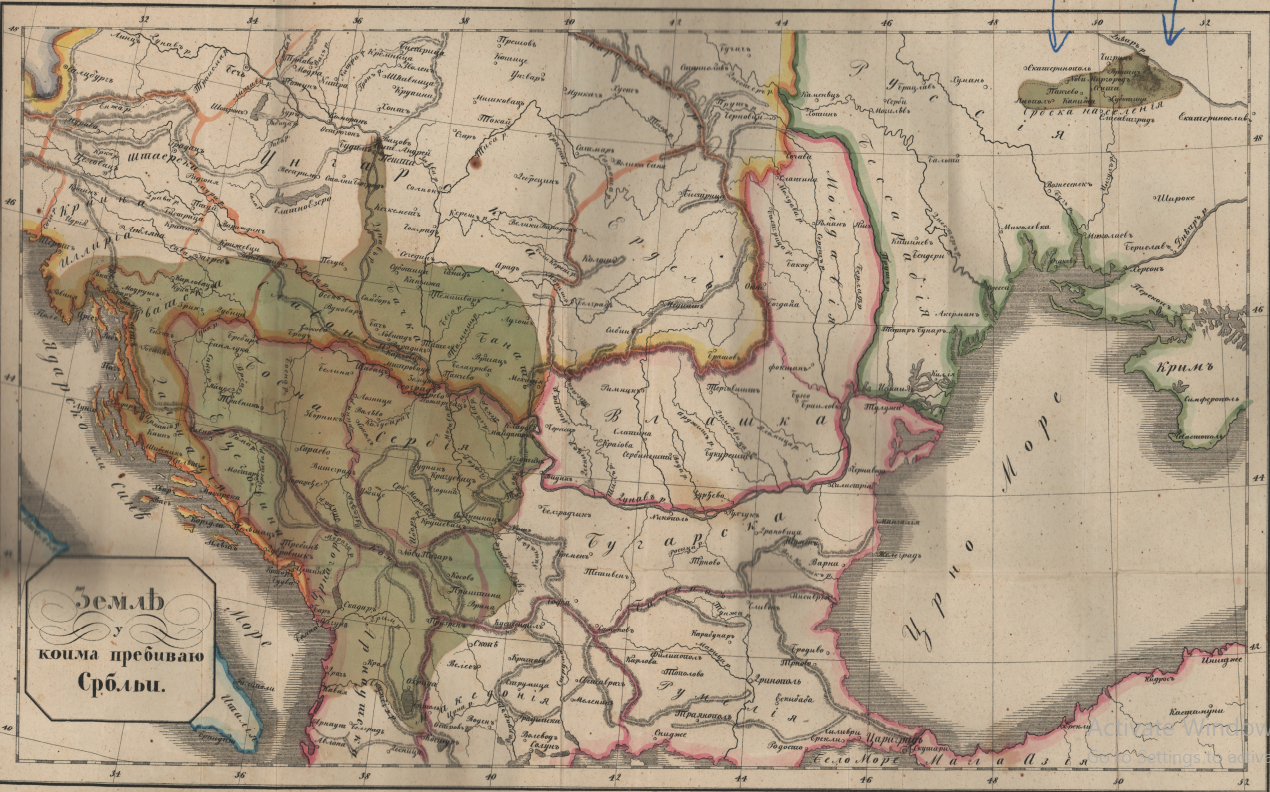
Map called: "Territories inhabited by Serbs". It forms a supplement to the first edition of the book: "History of the Serbian People, edited by Dimitrije Davidović," This map has appeared in Vienna in 1821. The map shows the ethnological boundaries of the Serbian people.

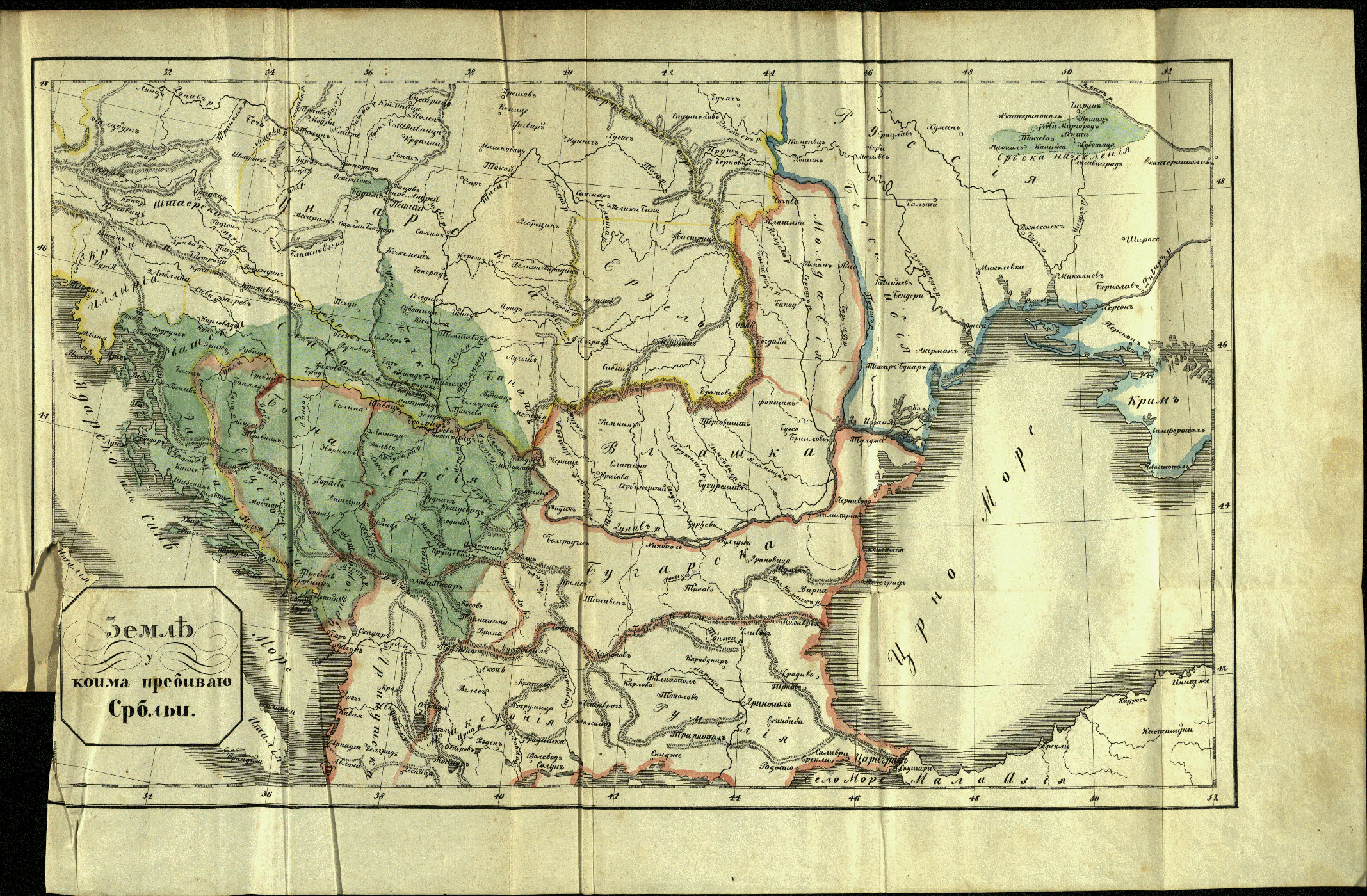
The map "Territories inhabited by Serbs", a supplement to the second edition of the book: "History of the Serbian People". This actualized map has appeared in Belgrade in 1846 and 1848, where it was published at the cost of the Serbian State.

While studying medicine in Vienna in 1812, Dimitrije Davidović wanted to start a Serbian newspaper but could not get a license which was personally denied by Klemens von Metternich himself. About 1813, in conjunction with a fellow student, Dimitrije Frušić, he founded and edited a Serbian newspaper in Vienna called Novine serbske iz carstvujuščeg grada Viene (Serbian news from the Imperial City of Vienna), and Zabavnik (Entertainment), in which many interesting particulars respecting the literature and political history of Serbia was published.

Like Stefan von Novaković, his predecessor, Davidović believed that any people who would like to be recognized as enlightened must have its national newspapers and magazines, which are essentially important for the four million Serbs living under the Habsburg yoke at the time. His Novine serbske iz carstvajuscega grada Viene (Serbian news from the Imperial City of Vienna) soon changed its direction from translations of travelogues, biographies, and writings on history to national issues (current events) and Serbian literature. Among the contributors in his newspaper and magazine were Lukijan Mušicki, Sima Milutinović Sarajlija, Teodor Pavlović, Georgije Magarašević, Danilo Medaković and other prominent Serbian poets and writers. Both the newspaper and almanach were eventually suppressed by the Austrian government in 1821. He wrote Istorija Serbije (History of Serbia), 1813-1815 and what is now considered his best work, Srbijanka (Serbian Woman, 1826), an epic poem in praise of the liberation of Serbia, led by Karađorđe Petrović (1804) and Miloš Obrenović (1813). Serbian historiography at the revolutionary time of pre-romanticism, it is said, has no better representative than Simeon Piščević, right up to Dimitrije Davidović.

His "History of the Serbian People", was published for the first time in Vienna in 1821, and supplemented by lawyer Jovan Hadžić, was reprinted in 1846 by Gligorije Vozarović. In 1848 the work was translated into French by Alfred Vigneron.

== Secretary to Prince Miloš Obrenović of Serbia ==
His talents gained him the favourable notice of Prince Miloš (Obrenović) of Serbia, who appointed Davidović secretary of his offices at Belgrade, and sent him on special diplomatic missions. According to prince Miloš's judgement Davidović was "exceptionally talented in diplomacy." He resided in Belgrade and enjoyed the continued favour of the court. He headed the Serbian diplomatic delegation in Istanbul (Constantinople), Turkey, from 1829 to 1833. He is considered by Serbian historians as one of the most important diplomats of his era.

In one of Davidović's patriotic appeals on 3 August 1821 he pointed out the need for female children's education. Since the state was technically at war with the Turks and almost unable to concern itself with the opening of a girls' school which at the time was prohibited by Moslem (Turkish) law. He was Minister of Education and Minister for Foreign Affairs from 8 June 1834 to 2 December 1835.

== Candlemas Constitution ==
In 1835 he was placed at the head of a committee to draw up a Serbian constitution; and it was, after all, chiefly drawn up by himself. Called "Sretenje Ustav" (Candlemas Constitution) it was drafted by Dimitrije Davidović to secure Serbia protection of citizens before the state and transformation of Serbia into a legal state with protected human and property rights for all. It was the first step toward power-sharing in modern Serb political history. But it was not to be expected that such sweeping changes could be affected without opposition, and no sooner the Sublime Porte and Austria brought their grievances against the implemented Sretenje. Prince Miloš yielded to them, but many of Davidović's followers were not so complacent, and it was only by threat of force of arms that the new constitution was abolished after being less than three weeks in force. Davidović and Prince Miloš sadly parted company under political pressure. Davidović withdrew from Belgrade to Smederevo, where he died three years later.

== Legacy ==
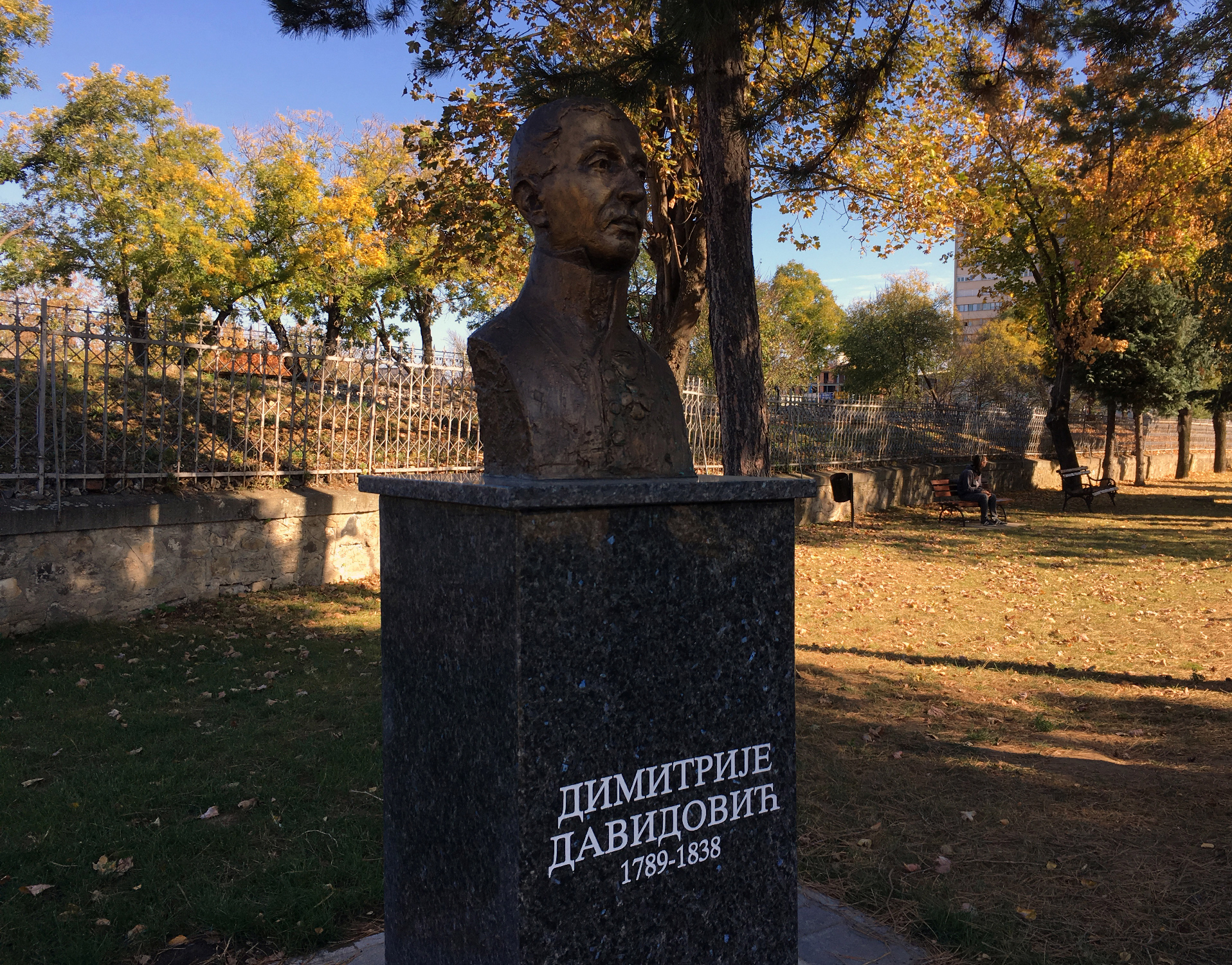
A bust of Davidović in Kragujevac

Dimitrije Davidović greatly distinguished himself as one of the most intrepid and influential supporters of the cause of liberalism, in both political and religious matters, until his death at Smederevo, where he died on 24 March 1838.

He belongs principally to the same class of writers as Djordje Magarašević, Teodor Pavlović, and Danilo Medaković who worked tirelessly more on a cultural and political plain than literary.

=== House of Dimitrije Davidović ===
House of Dimitrije Davidović
- Kuća D. Davidovića (Serbian)
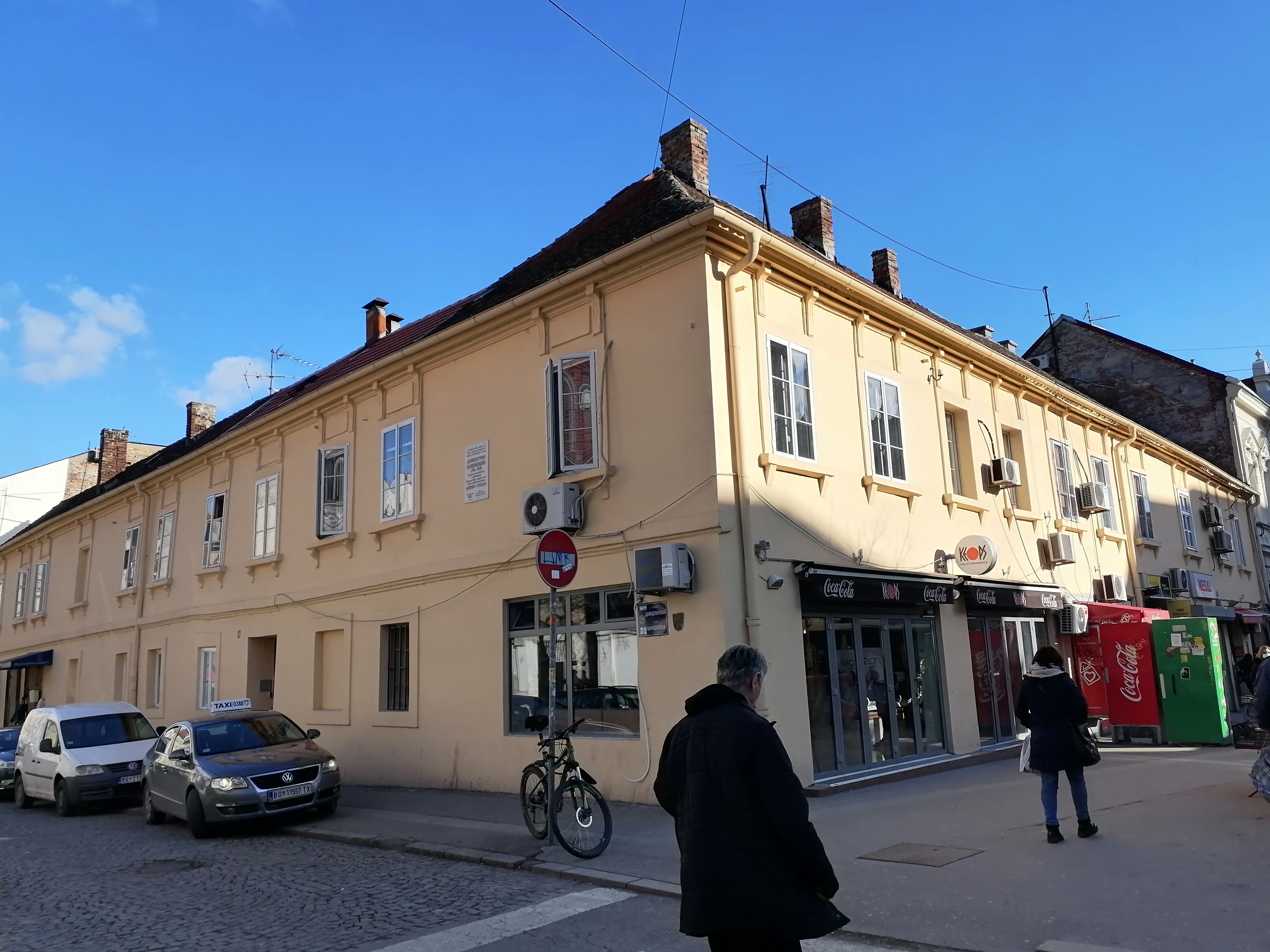
- Interactive map of House of Dimitrije Davidović
- 43°13′17″N 21°50′41″E
- Location: Belgrade, 11000, Serbia

The House of Dimitrije Davidović is located in Belgrade, in Zemun, at the corner of the Zemun Main Street and Davidović Street. It is part of the Cultural Monuments of Exceptional Importance and is protected by Serbia. The complex was developed from the mid-18th to mid-19th century, and includes an inner courtyard. The house is a typical one-story residential house with two tracts, six windows, with long fronts on both sides of the street. The uniform facades comprise all the development phases of the building and contribute to an integral spatial impression. House represents a more modest variation of the classic townhouse, with harmonic proportions, simplicity, and coherence in the treatment of its facades.

== See also ==
- Avram Petronijević
- Toma Vučić-Perišić
- Ilija Garašanin
- Aleksa Simić
- Milutin Savić

== Note ==
Government offices
Preceded by Miloje Todorović	Prime Minister of Serbia; 1826–1829	Succeeded by Koča Marković
Preceded by Lazar Teodorović	Minister of Foreign Affairs and Education of Serbia; 1834–1835	Succeeded by Tenka Stefanović
