= Koca Marković =

Serbian trader, politician

Representative of the Prince of Serbia
- In office 1835–1835
- Monarch: Miloš I
- Preceded by: Jevrem Obrenović
- Succeeded by: Dimitrije Davidović

Personal details
- Born: 1795 Požarevac, Ottoman Empire (present-day Serbia)
- Died: 1836 (aged 40–41) Požarevac, Principality of Serbia (present-day Serbia)

Nikola "Koca" Marković (Serbian Cyrillic: Коца Марковић; 1762 – 1832) was a Serbian trader, representative of Prince Miloš Obrenović, and politician. He was Prince Miloš's most influential advisor during the most critical time of the Second Serbian Uprising in 1815.

Political offices
Preceded by Dimitrije Davidović	Prime Minister of Serbia; 1835	Succeeded by Tenka Stefanović
