= Vukovići, Ravno =

Vukovići Вуковићи
- Village
- Location within Bosnia and Herzegovina
- Country: Bosnia and Herzegovina
- Entity: Federation of Bosnia and Herzegovina
- Canton: Herzegovina-Neretva
- Municipality: Ravno

Area
  - Total: 1.91 sq mi (4.95 km^{2})

Population (2013)
  - Total: 4
  - Density: 2.1/sq mi (0.81/km^{2})
- Time zone: UTC+1 (CET)
  - Summer (DST): UTC+2 (CEST)

Vukovići (Serbian Cyrillic: Вуковићи) is a village in Ravno, Bosnia and Herzegovina. It was formerly part of Trebinje, which is now in Republika Srpska.

== Geography ==
- Trebinjska Krajina

== Demographics ==
- 1991: 6 Serbs (100%)
- 1981: 7 Serbs (100%)
- 1971: 25 Serbs (100%)
- 1961: 32 Serbs (100%)

According to the 2013 census, its population was 4, all Serbs.
