= Toma Vučić Perišić =

Serbian politician

Gospodar Toma Vučić Perišić
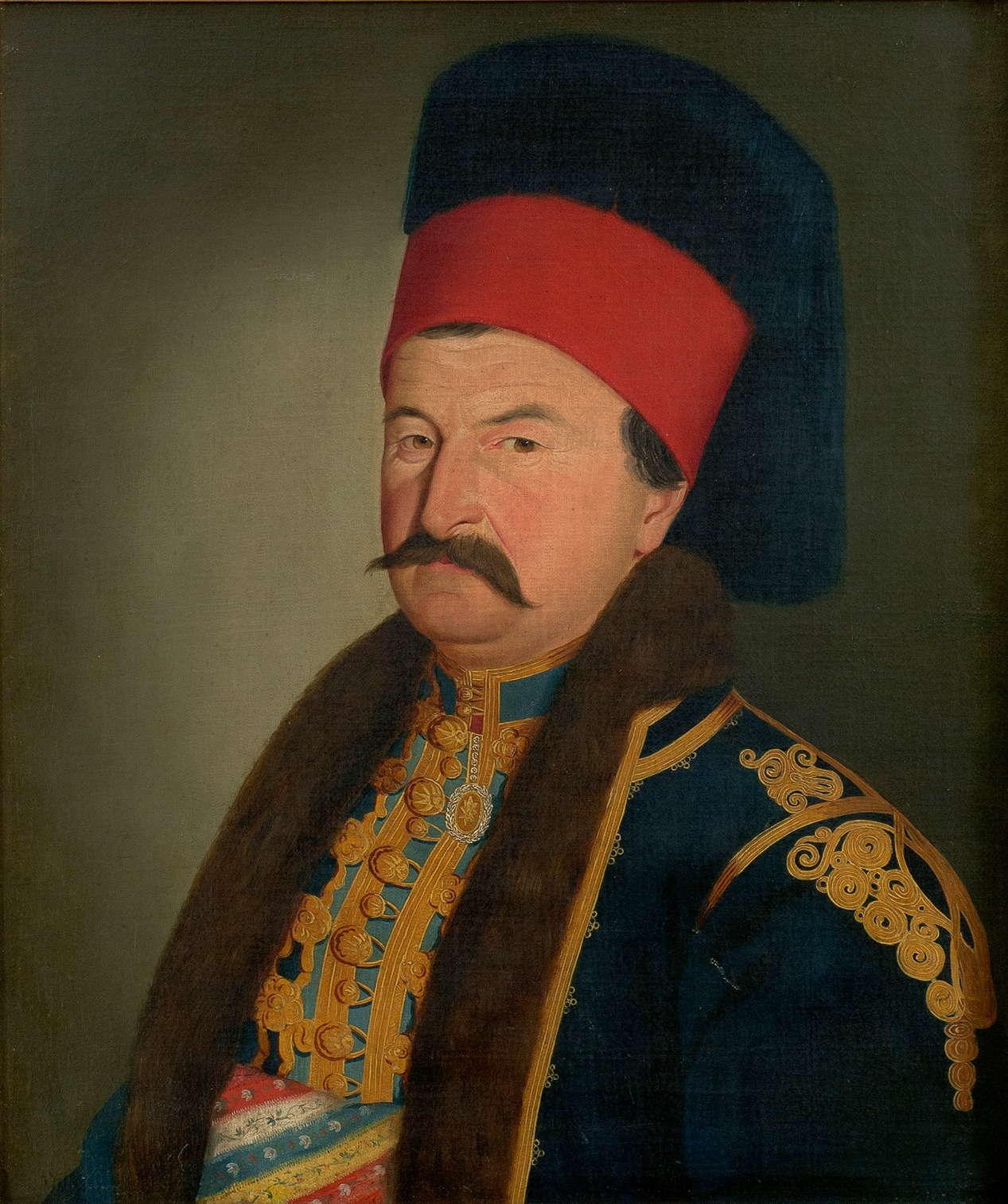
- Portrait by Jovan Popović, 1841

Regent of Serbia
- In office 25 June 1839 – 14 March 1840 Serving with Jevrem Obrenović, Avram Petronijević
- Monarchs: Milan II; Mihailo III

Minister of Internal Affairs
- In office 8 September 1842 – 20 June 1843
- Monarch: Alexander
- Preceded by: Cvetko Rajović
- Succeeded by: Ilija Garašanin

Personal details
- Born: 1787 Barič, Ottoman Empire (modern-day Serbia)
- Died: 13 July 1859 (aged 71–72) Belgrade, Principality of Serbia
- Awards: Order of Glory

Toma Vučić Perišić (Serbian: Тома Вучић Перишић; 1787–1859) was a Serbian politician, military leader during the Serbian Revolution, Freemason and one of the most powerful and influential individuals in Serbia of the 19th century. He was a governor (knez) of Gruža during the reign of Prince Miloš.

== Biography ==
Vučić joined Karađorđe's personal guard after completing training in 1804. In 1810, due to criminal acts, he left his area and briefly joined Hajduk-Veljko's mercenaries. He then returned to Gruža. When the uprising was suppressed in 1813, he remained in Serbia as he was unknown to the Turks. He participated in the preparations for rebellion in Gruža to be connected with the Hadži-Prodan's rebellion (September 1814).

He was Miloš Obrenović's most virulent opponent, and an ally of the Karađorđević Dynasty with Avram Petronijević, Ilija Garašanin, Miša Anastasijević, Metropolitan Petar Jovanović, Lazar Arsenijević Batalaka, Milivoje Blaznavac and other so-called Constitutionalists (Dimitrije Davidović, Aleksa Simić, Stojan Simić, Milutin Savić). He wanted to bring rule of law and an effective administrative system in the Principality of Serbia, if only foreign interference was not an issue. Eventually, in the political tug-of-war, the constitutionalists period came to an abrupt end with the former absolute ruler reclaiming the throne, and Vučić Perišić was poisoned.

He married twice, first time with Perunika Žabarac and second wife Agnija nicknamed Nula, sister of a Greek revolutionary leader of the Greek War of Independence, Yiannis Pharmakis. With his first wife he had four children, two daughters (Stanka and Anka) and two sons (Stevan and Ilija). According to some sources, Vučić dug out his own eye with a fork during a lunch, because he had an eye pain.

A street in Belgrade is named after him.

== See also ==
- List of Serbian Revolutionaries

Government offices
Preceded by Cvetko Rajović	Minister of Internal Affairs; 1842–1843	Succeeded by Ilija Garašanin
