= 1869 Serbian parliamentary election =

Parliamentary elections were held in Serbia in 1869 to elect a Grand National Assembly to approve a new constitution.

== Background ==
Following the assassination of Prince Mihailo in 1868, there was no obvious successor as Mihailo had been childless. Politicians established the 'Temporary Viceroyalty of Princely Dignity', consisting of Rajko Lešjani (Minister of Justice) Jovan Marinović (President of the State Council) and Đorđe Petrović (President of the Court of Cassation). The Viceroyalty announced that a Grand National Assembly would be elected and meet in Topčider within a month to elect a new prince. Elections to the 504-seat Assembly were held in early June and the Assembly met on 20 June. However, prior to it meeting, 14-year-old Milan was chosen as Mihailo's successor by Minister of War Milivoje Blaznavac. As a result, when the Assembly met, its revised task was to confirm Milan's selection and to appoint a regent. Milan's selection was confirmed unanimously, while Blaznavac, Jovan Ristić and Jovan Gavrilović were chosen as the regents. The Assembly was then disbanded on 24 June, with its members having expressed a desire to replace the 1838 'Turkish' constitution.

The Viceroyalty subsequently established the Svetonikoli committee, which was tasked with determining whether a new constitution was required, and if it was, to draft one. The committee was formed of 70 members from the political and clerical elite. After it had drafted a new constitution, a Grand National Assembly was required to be convened to approve it. As a result, elections were called to elect the 516 members of the Assembly, which would meet in Kragujevac.

== Results ==
Nearly all seats were won by the Liberal Party.

== Aftermath ==
The Assembly met for the first time on 10 June, with Živko Karabiberović chosen as president and Todor Tucaković as vice president, before it was formally opened on 12 June.

Following the approval of the new constitution, the Assembly was dissolved with the intent of convening an extraordinary Legislative Assembly to amend and pass laws that were in line with the new constitution. This was elected the following year. After passing most of the legislation required, the Assembly was dissolved the following year and parliamentary elections were held in August 1871.
