= Misdemeanor Appellate Court =

Serbian court of law

- Прекршајни апелациони суд
- Established: 2010
- Jurisdiction: Serbia
- Location: Belgrade
- Authorised by: Constitution of Serbia
- Appeals to: Supreme Court
- Number of positions: 65
- Website: pkap.sud.rs

The Misdemeanor Appellate Court is a court of law in Serbia.

== History ==
Legal norms in the field of rights infringement could be found in the Roman private law. Such norms were made for keeping the peace, against violence, arbitrariness, trespass, etc... He brought them to the Edil, and he had, among other things, the task of ensuring order in the streets, markets and other public places. Taking the office Edil issued a proclamation on how to resolve individual cases that come to him. These legal norms were called edicts, and for them are a process quicker and with less formality than it were in criminal and civil proceedings.

In the former Yugoslavia offenses were the subject of criminal law and only in Vojvodina was considered a special Law on Minor Offences, which was adopted in 1879., during Austro Hungarian reign. On 10 June 1926. The misdemeanor law was made by the Kingdom of Serbs, Croats and Slovenes (Recitals 1 Misdemeanors are those offenses for which the law prescribes imprisonment of thirty days or a fine of up to nine hundred thousand.)

Penal Code that was enacted in 1929 did not provided legal proceedings for misdemeanor offenses, as the same should be regulated by the above-mentioned Act, which was prepared as preliminary draft, however, it was never adopted.

The Basic Law on Misdemeanors in FNRJ was passed in 1947. It was a federal law, completely proscribing all postulates regarding misdemeanor offences: the conditions and basis of criminal liability, penalties, statute of limitations, the organization and jurisdiction of the misdemeanor authority, infringement procedure and other provisions, including enforcement of the law.

New Basic Law on offenses was adopted in 1951. in the form of the revised text, and the amendments to the Basic Law on offenses committed in 1965. and contains important innovations in the system of criminal proceedings. For prosecution is competent municipal magistrate, and in the second instance is responsible Sresko more misdemeanor, unless the law stipulates that in the second instance proceedings Republican Council for violations. Major innovations consist in the fact that the defendant is allowed to misdemeanor proceedings may be taken counsel, introduced a legal institution of judicial protection and restoration of the institute the proceedings.

In the time since 1972. until 1974. was a period of national and provincial adoption of the Law on Minor Offenses. As in most other areas in the field of offenses we got 9 jurisdictions, governed by federal, state and provincial laws.

The Socialist Republic of Serbia, out of province, in the first instance misdemeanor proceedings shall be conducted Magistrate or City Magistrate of Belgrade, and in the second instance, the City Council of the City of Belgrade misdemeanor or higher for offenses that are located at the headquarters of the inter-municipal regional communities. In the Autonomous Province of Kosovo constituted courts for offenses, while in the province of Vojvodina in the first instance proceedings will be conducted magistrates, and in the second instance, the province Greater misdemeanor.

Finally, in 2005, a new Law on Minor Offenses, published in the "Official Gazette of RS", No. 101 of 25.11.2005., which after several delays became effective 1 January 2010. Establishment of special magistrates' courts and translation magistrates from the administrative spheres in the justice system, the Law on Judges, the Law on Courts and the Law on Seats and Territories of Courts and Public Prosecutors ("Off. Gazette." No. 116/08) were solved. One of the most important and controversial issues of our tort law and thus fulfilled the constitutional and international demand that the rights and duties of citizens, especially their punishment may ultimately be decided by a court.

== Jurisdiction ==
The Misdemeanor Appellate Court of the Republic of Serbia it is the court of appellate which reviews and possibly overturns previous rulings made by lower courts. The MAC also decides on the conflict and jurisdiction of lower magistrates' courts and perform other duties, and it can take other legal actions in other legal matters prescribed by law.

Also, The Misdemeanor Appellate Court reviews and monitors the work of Magistrates' courts, by obtaining data from the court records and reports required to monitor misdemeanor practice, practical application of laws and regulations, monitoring and analyzing social phenomena and relations, and information on other matters of interest to the exercise of their functions.

Misdemeanor Appellate Court has a total of 174 employees, of which 65 Judges including Chief Judge.

== Departments ==
Departments of the Misdemeanor Appellate Court outside the seat of the court, are located in city of Novi Sad, Kragujevac and Nis, and they have same legal authority to decide on appeals against decisions of magistrates' courts, and to take other legal action prescribed by law.

Article 7 of Law on Seats and Territories of Courts and Public Prosecutors were identified by the Department of the Higher Magistrates Court as follows:

- The MAC department in Kragujevac oversees regional areas for magistrates' courts located in cities of Arandelovac, Milanovac, Jagodina, Kragujevac, Kraljevo, Krusevac, Novi Pazar and Paracic Požegi, Prijepolju, Raska, arbor, Trsteniku and Uzice.
- The MAC department in Nis oversees regional areas for magistrates' courts located in cities of Vranje, Zajecar, Leskovac, and Kosovska Mitrovica Negotin, Nis, Pirot, Presevo and Prokuplje.
- The MAC department in Novi Sad oversees regional areas for magistrates' courts located in cities of Backa Palanka, Bečej, Vrsac, Zrenjanin, Kikinda, Novi Sad, Šabac, Rumi, Senta, Sombor, Sremska Mitrovica and Subotica.

== Organization ==
=== Court administration ===
Court administration perform tasks that support the exercise of judicial power, provides conditions for proper and timely operation and legal matter of the court and include administrative, technical, professional, IT, financial and other related departments relevant to the judicial authority.

=== Court registry ===
Administrative and technical work is performed at the court in the court clerk's office, at the seat of the court in Belgrade.

=== Archive & Almanac ===
Finally resolved legal documents are archived and stored in the archive, which is a part of the Registry.

=== Accounting ===
Material and financial transactions are carried out by the Accounting department, HQ in the seat of the court.

=== Department of Information and Communication Technologies ===
Formed for activities related to the establishment and maintenance of ICT and electronic data processing, storage and transmission of information in court and between departments located outside HQ, and with lower misdemeanor courts.

=== Distribution of cases ===
In accordance with court rules, the newly items are first sorted by urgency, type of procedure, and the legal field, and then distributed according to the reckoning of receipt, by random determination of the Judge.

=== Reception ===
The President or his designee considers the complaints of the parties and other participants in the judicial process who believe the process is delayed, improper, or that there is any influence on the course and outcome, and take certain measures in accordance with the law.

=== Jurisprudence ===
In order to monitor and study the case law of the court with a number of judges formed by the Department of case law, and the Head of the Department of case law, and judges appointed by the president of the court.

=== Counseling & Legal Training ===
Judges and court staff have the right to professional development and training.

=== PR & Press Releases ===
Press release about the court and some cases gives the President, and the person responsible for informing the public (spokesperson, Press Officer, etc.), or a special service for information.

=== Reports and statistics ===
The Registry compiles regular and periodic reports of the court, the departments and the judges, according to the prescribed standard methodology.
