= 1868 Serbian parliamentary election =

Parliamentary elections were held in Serbia in June 1868 to elect a 504-seat Grand National Assembly.

== Background ==
Following the assassination of Prince Mihailo on 29 May 1868 there was no obvious successor as Mihailo had been childless. Politicians established the 'Temporary Viceroyalty of Princely Dignity', consisting of Rajko Lešjani (Minister of Justice) Jovan Marinović (President of the State Council) and Đorđe Petrović (President of the Court of Cassation). The Viceroyalty announced that a Grand National Assembly would be elected and meet in Topčider within a month to elect a new prince.

== Results ==
Most elected members were liberals (who would soon form the formalised Liberal Party), with a small number of conservatives.

== Aftermath ==
The Assembly met on 20 June, with Živko Karabiberović chosen as president and Todor Tucaković as vice president.

Prior to the Assembly meeting, 14-year-old Milan had been chosen as Mihailo's successor by Minister of War Milivoje Blaznavac. As a result, when the Assembly met it was limited to confirming Milan's selection and appointing a regent. Milan's selection was confirmed unanimously, while Blaznavac, Jovan Ristić and Jovan Gavrilović were chosen as the regents. The Assembly was then disbanded on 24 June, with its members having expressed a desire to replace the 1838 'Turkish' constitution.

The Viceroyalty subsequently established the Svetonikoli committee, which was tasked with determining whether a new constitution was required, and if it was, to draft one. The committee was formed of 70 members from the political and clerical elite. After it had drafted a new constitution, a Grand National Assembly was required to be convened to approve it. As a result, elections were called to elect the 516 members of the Assembly, which would meet in Kragujevac.
