= 2006 Serbian constitutional referendum =

- 28–29 October 2006
- Are you in favor of confirming the new Constitution of the Republic of Serbia?
- A billboard from the Democratic Party supports the constitutional changes in the 2006 referendum

Results
| Choice | Votes | % |
|---|---|---|
| Yes | 3,521,724 | 97.31% |
| No | 97,497 | 2.69% |
| Valid votes | 3,619,221 | 99.28% |
| Invalid or blank votes | 25,866 | 0.71% |
| Total votes | 3,645,517 | 100.00% |
| Registered voters/turnout | 6,639,385 | 54.91% |

A constitutional referendum was held in Serbia on 28 and 29 October 2006, in which voters decided on adopting a new Constitution. The constitution is Serbia's first as an independent state since the Kingdom of Serbia's 1903 constitution. Over 6.6 million people were entitled to vote in the national referendum.

== Background ==
The previous Constitution of Serbia was adopted in the 1990 referendum, when Slobodan Milošević served as president of Serbia. Another referendum was held in 1992, although due to low turnout, proposed changes were not implemented. Milošević was overthrown in October 2000, after which the Democratic Opposition of Serbia (DOS) coalition came to power. As one of the pre-election promises, DOS had wanted to hold a new constitutional referendum, although it failed to do so. Vojislav Koštunica and Zoran Đinđić, who headed the Democratic Party of Serbia (DSS) and Democratic Party (DS) respectively, had ended up in a dispute which led to the dissolution of DOS. Following Đinđić's assassination in March 2003, parliamentary elections were held in December, although they were inconclusive due to low voter turnout. The Serbian Radical Party (SRS) placed first in the election, although it was excluded from government formation talks. Koštunica became the prime minister of Serbia in March 2004. A constitutional initiative was also sent to the National Assembly in the same year. Two constitutional drafts were later published; the government had published its own draft in June 2004, while the president's office published it in January 2005. A number of scholars had published projects regarding the Constitution after 2004.

An independence referendum was held in Montenegro on 21 May 2006. Majority of the voters had voted in favor of independence, which marked the end of State Union of Serbia and Montenegro. Due to the declaration of independence of Montenegro, a new constitution had to be implemented.

== Conduct ==
Kosovo Albanians had boycotted elections since 1990, and because of it, they could not vote in the referendum, as they were not included on the electoral roll.

== Proposed changes ==
The National Assembly adopted the draft, with 242 votes in favor, on 30 September. It also set 28 and 29 October as the dates of the referendum. The draft was the result of a compromise between major political parties.

In the preamble, it was defined that Kosovo is an "integral part" of Serbia with a fundamental autonomy. Additionally, it also defines Serbia as an independent state and it mentions the Serbian Cyrillic script as the only official alphabet in use, while minority languages could use other alphabets at the local level. After the adoption of the new constitution, minority and human rights would be guaranteed, while Vojvodina also received a form of self-rule. It also introduced a ban on death penalty. The constitution had also proclaimed Kosovo to be "an integral part of Serbia" and that it would have a "wide" autonomy.

Differences between the 1990 Constitution and the 2006 draft are noticeable. Social property was abolished, while private, cooperative, and public property would be only acknowledged. The title of Ombudsman would be introduced alongside the right to constitutional appeal against individual acts of state bodies. The role of the Constitutional Court would be strengthened, which together with the National Assembly could replace the directly elected president. Supreme Court of Cassation would become the highest judicial instance.

Journalist Slobodan Bubnjević pointed out that in the third paragraph of Article 24 it is mentioned that "cloning of human beings is prohibited".

== Reception ==
Nick Hawton of BBC stated that there was little amount of enthusiasm in the public regarding the referendum.

The government had allocated 586 million dinars from the budget for the campaign.

While it was more or less universally accepted that the new constitution draft was a significant improvement over the 1990 constitution, the main objections of the public were directed at the untransparent way in which the draft was drawn up and approved by parliament. Even President Tadić acknowledged that "...I sense a certain uneasiness that we did not have a full public discussion about the constitution, due to the speed and pace at which it was seems to be adopted".

Several international law experts and independent analysts pointed out that the new article 16, which states that all international treaties must comply with the provisions of the constitution, sets up an inherent conflict, and can present an obstacle to the country's accession to European Union.

Another obstacle was how to ensure the constitutional limit of 50% of registered voters. Republic Election Commission (RIK) placed the total number of electors at 6,639,385—that excluded Kosovo Albanians, who have been boycotting all Serbian elections and censuses since 1990. Critics pointed that it's hypocritical to exclude Albanian voters from the balloting about the document which states that Kosovo is part of Serbia. Political analyst and president of Transparency Serbia Vladimir Goati said that "It is pointless to state that they are not on the voter list, because they are boycotting all Serbian elections. If you recognize someone as a citizen of your country, then you cannot take away his or her right to boycott."; however, the practice of excluding Kosovo Albanians has been adopted in several elections before. Also, opponents of the constitution such as Serbia's Liberal Party pointed out that the decision of the Republic Election Commission that potentially an extra number of ballots would be ignored, was unlawful and outrageous.

All major political parties supported the draft and began a public campaign for the referendum. The only political bloc that campaigned against the draft and advocated public boycott was a group of liberal and social-democrat parties (Čedomir Jovanović's Liberal Democratic Party, Nenad Čanak's League of Vojvodina Social Democrats, Žarko Korać's Social Democratic Union, Nataša Mićić's Civic Alliance of Serbia) and a number of NGOs. They objected to the lack of public discussion, argued that the claims to Kosovo in the preamble were a populist attempt to encourage the voters. Some were also dissatisfied with the level of autonomy given to Vojvodina. (On the 2007 election, those parties formed the coalition and entered the Parliament with about 5.3% support).

=== "Yes" campaign ===
Democratic Party of Serbia (DSS), led by Vojislav Koštunica, launched their campaign on 11 October. DSS had stated that they would distribute leaflets and other propaganda material. The Democratic Party (DS), Serbian Renewal Movement (SPO), New Serbia (NS), and G17 Plus began campaigning soon after.

Ivica Dačić, leader of the Socialist Party of Serbia (SPS), had stated his support for the draft. Although, Dačić had also stated that SPS did not vote for Bože pravde as the national anthem of Serbia. He later criticized MPs Goran Svilanović, Nataša Mićić, and Žarko Korać for not signing in favor of the draft document. Alongside SPS, the Serbian Radical Party (SRS) and G17 Plus had also stated their support for the draft.

Sportspeople Dejan Stanković, Novak Djokovic, and film director Emir Kusturica called for citizens to vote in favor.

=== "No" campaign ===
The draft was opposed by the Liberal Democratic Party (LDP), Vojvodina Autonomists, and some non-governmental organizations. The Democratic Party of Albanians (PDSH), Party for Democratic Action (PVD), and Movement for Democratic Progress (LPD) had advocated for the boycott of the referendum. Additionally, the Democratic Fellowship of Vojvodina Hungarians (DZVM) had called their voters to vote against the proposed changes.

== Results ==
Polling stations were opened on 28 and 29 October, and there were about 6.5 million people that had the right to vote in total. Preliminary results that were published by the Republic Electoral Commission (RIK) showed that 51.5% of voters had voted in favor of the draft. Officials results had later shown that 54.9% of the electorate took part in the referendum, while 53% voted for the "yes" option. Kosovo Serbs had turned out in large numbers.

According to preliminary counts published by the Republic Election Commission, 51.46% of the electorate (95.9% of those voting) supported the constitution, with 50% support needed for it to come into effect. The voter turnout amounted to 53.66%. The turnout of registered voters in Kosovo reached 90.1%, as Kosovo Albanians, who make up around 90% of the province's two million population, were not able to vote as they were not included on voters lists after boycotting Serbian elections since 1990. The turnout in Vojvodina was also low (45.9%), as several regional parties and NGOs called for a boycott, stating that the degree of the province's autonomy was insufficient. The Speaker of the Vojvodina provincial assembly, Bojan Kostreš, accused the authorities of "forcing the new constitution". "The final voting hours were very strange, with a sudden, steep rise in turnout", he said. Several political analysts pointed out that similar scenarios have happened before; analyst Đorđe Vukadinović stated that "...the turnout of three to five percent per hour has been reached on several occasions in the past ten years.", while many commentators also pointed out that non-stop public messages on TV urging people to vote, the appearance of Serbian Patriarch Pavle voting on a TV broadcast, and an increase in awareness about the problems that would occur if the referendum failed, may also have played the role in increasing turnout.

The final results of the referendum were declared by the Republic Election Commission on 2 November 2006: voter turnout amounted to 3,645,517, or 54.91% of the electorate (totally 6,639,385 citizens), of which 25,866 votes were declared invalid and thus the final valid figure of 3,619,221 votes published. The new constitution was supported by 3,521,724 voters, or 53.04% of the electorate and 96.60% of those voting; 97,497 voters (1.47% of those registered and 2.67% of those voting) were against the new constitution; 25,866 votes were invalid.

| Choice | Votes | % |
|---|---|---|
| For | 3,521,724 | 97.31 |
| Against | 97,497 | 2.69 |
| Total | 3,619,221 | 100.00 |
| Valid votes | 3,619,221 | 99.29 |
| Invalid/blank votes | 25,866 | 0.71 |
| Total votes | 3,645,087 | 100.00 |
| Registered voters/turnout | 6,639,385 | 54.90 |
Source: RTS

== Aftermath ==
Vojislav Koštunica, the prime minister of Serbia, stated that the results showed "a great moment for Serbia". He had also stated that with the constitution in place "we will be defending more than our interests, more than the issue of stability in the region. We will be defending international law". Boris Tadić, the president of Serbia, stated that with the results in place, "citizens showed their support for a European Serbia".

Minor parties had claimed that electoral irregularities occurred and that the turnout was 49%. Journalist Dimitrije Boarov criticized the draft, mostly in regard the changes that Vojvodina received. Žarko Korać criticized the draft and stated that it was shown "as the crown of state-building efforts of Koštunica's government to "save" Serbia".

The Constitution was adopted on 8 November.

The referendum and the text of the new Serbian Constitution have been sharply criticized by International Crisis Group. Despite the drawbacks, the European Union and Organization for Security and Co-operation in Europe endorsed the proposed changes. Cristina Gallach, spokeswoman of EU High Representative for Foreign and Security Policy Javier Solana, stated that "[The EU] positively assesses the fact that Serbia is changing the Constitution from the time of Slobodan Milošević".

The law on referendum and people's initiative, which was supposed to be implemented after the 2006 constitutional referendum, was adopted by the National Assembly in November 2021.

== See also ==
- Constitution of Serbia
- Constitutional status of Kosovo
