= 1870 Serbian parliamentary election =

Parliamentary elections were held in Serbia in 1870.

== Background ==
Following the promulgation of the 1869 constitution by the Grand National Assembly elected in 1869, the Assembly was dissolved with the intent of convening an extraordinary Legislative Assembly to amend and pass laws that were in line with the new constitution. On 7 August 1870 a decree was passed setting the election date.

== Electoral system ==
As no new electoral law had been passed, the elections were held in accordance with the previous constitution. 97 deputies were elected, with the monarch given the right to appoint up to 32 members.

== Aftermath ==
Following the elections, Prince Milan appointed 24 members. The Assembly convened on 14 September with Živko Karabiberović becoming president of the Assembly and Josif Pančić becoming vice-president.

After passing most of the legislation required, the Assembly was dissolved the following year and fresh elections held in August 1871.
