= Principality of Serbia =

Country in Southeastern Europe (1815–1882)

Coordinates: 44°48′39″N 20°27′45″E

Principality of Serbia Књажество Србија Knjažestvo Srbija
- 1815–1882
- Flag Coat of arms

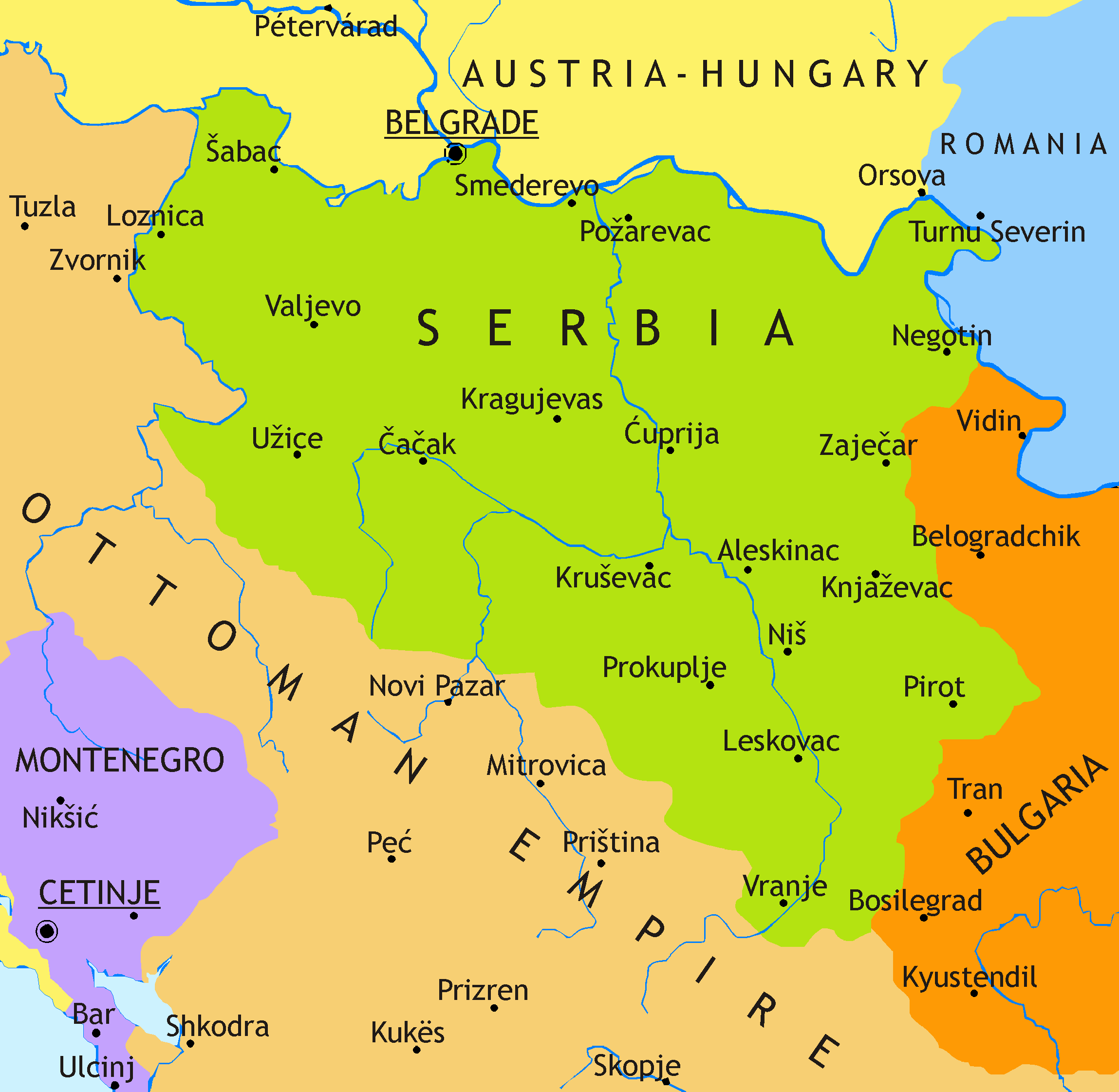
- Principality of Serbia in 1878
- Capital: Gornja Crnuća (1815–1818); Kragujevac (1818–1841); Belgrade (1841–1882)
- Common languages: Serbian
- Religion: Eastern Orthodoxy
- Demonym: Serbian
- Government: Absolute monarchy (1815–1838); Constitutional monarchy (1838–1882)
- Prince
  - 1817–1839 (first): Miloš Obrenović I
  - 1868–1882 (last): Milan Obrenović IV
- Prime Minister
  - 1815–1816 (first): Petar Nikolajević
  - 1880–1882 (last): Milan Piroćanac
- Legislature: National Assembly (1838–1882)
- History
  - Recognition by the Sublime Porte: 1815
  - de facto independence: 18 April 1867
  - de jure independence: 13 July 1878
  - Proclamation of the Kingdom: 1882

Area
- 1815: 24,440 km^{2} (9,440 sq mi)
- 1834: 37,511 km^{2} (14,483 sq mi)

Population
  - 1815: 322,500–342,000
  - 1834: 702,000
  - 1874: 1,353,000
Preceded by	Succeeded by
Sanjak of Smederevo; Revolutionary Serbia	Kingdom of Serbia
- Today part of: Serbia

The Principality of Serbia (Serbian: Књажество Србија, romanized: Knjažestvo Srbija) was an autonomous, later sovereign state in Southeastern Europe that came into existence as a result of the Serbian Revolution. Its creation was negotiated first through an unwritten agreement between Miloš Obrenović, leader of the Second Serbian Uprising, and Ottoman official Marashli Pasha, followed by a series of decrees of the Sublime Porte in 1828–1833. Its de facto independence ensued in 1867, following the evacuation of the remaining Ottoman troops from the Belgrade Fortress and the rest of the country; its independence was recognized internationally in 1878 by the Treaty of Berlin. In 1882 the country was elevated to the status of kingdom.

== History ==
The Serbian revolutionary leaders, first Karađorđe and then Miloš Obrenović, succeeded in their goal of liberating Serbia from centuries-long Ottoman rule. Ottoman authorities acknowledged the state by the 1830 Hatt-i Sharif, and Miloš Obrenović became the hereditary prince (knjaz) of Serbia. Serbia was de jure an autonomous province of the Ottoman Empire, its autonomy was constrained by the presence of the Ottoman army on its soil and by being forced to pay to Istanbul a yearly tribute of 2.3 million groschen, which represented about 10% of the country's budget.

At first, the principality included only the territory of the former Pashaluk of Belgrade, but in 1831–1833 it expanded to the east, south, and west. In 1866 Serbia began the campaign of forging the First Balkan Alliance by signing a series of agreements with other Balkan entities in the period 1866–1868. On 18 April 1867 the Ottoman government ordered the Ottoman garrison, which since 1826 had been the last representation of Ottoman suzerainty in Serbia, withdrawn from the Belgrade Fortress. The only stipulation was that the Ottoman flag continue to fly over the fortress alongside the Serbian one. Serbia's de facto independence dates from this event. A new constitution in 1869 defined Serbia as an independent state. Serbia was further expanded to the southeast in 1878, when its independence from the Ottoman Empire won full international recognition at the Treaty of Berlin. The Principality would last until 1882 when it was raised to the level of the Kingdom of Serbia.

== Politics ==
=== Constitutions ===
- 1835 Constitution of Serbia, 1835
- 1838 Constitution of Serbia, 1838–1869
- 1869 Constitution of Serbia, 1869–1888

=== Autonomy ===
- Akkerman Convention (7 October 1826), treaty between the Russian Empire and Ottoman Empire, contained article 5 on Serbia: autonomy, and return of lands removed in 1813, Serbs were also granted freedom of movement through the Ottoman Empire. Rejected by Mahmud II in 1828.
- 1829 hatt-i sharif
- 1830 hatt-i sharif
- 1833 hatt-i sharif

== Administrative divisions ==
The Ottoman-derived nahija remained as the highest administrative unit until 1834. Following 1836, Serbia was administratively organized into 17 okrug (districts), in turn divided into srez.

== Military ==
The Armed Forces of the Principality of Serbia was the armed forces of the Principality of Serbia. Founded in 1830, it became a standing army to take part to the Serbo-Ottoman Wars of 1876–1878, the first conflict in the nation's modern history, after which the country gained its full independence. It was succeeded by the Royal Serbian Army.

== Demographics ==
Historical population
Year	Pop.	±%
1834	678,192	—
1841	828,895	+22.2%
1843	859,545	+3.7%
1846	915,080	+6.5%
1850	956,893	+4.6%
1854	998,919	+4.4%
1859	1,078,281	+7.9%
1863	1,108,668	+2.8%
1866	1,216,219	+9.7%
1878	1,669,337	+37.3%

In the first decades of the principality, the population was about 85% Serb and 15% non-Serb. Of those, most were Vlachs, and there were some Muslim Albanians, which were the overwhelming majority of the Muslims that lived in Smederevo, Kladovo and Ćuprija. The new state aimed to homogenize its population. As a result, from 1830 to the wars of the 1870s in which Albanians were expelled from the country, it has been estimated that up to 150,000 Albanians that lived in the territories of the Principality of Serbia had been expelled. In 1862 more than 10,000 Muslims were expelled to Ottoman Bulgaria and Ottoman Bosnia. During the Serbian–Ottoman Wars of 1876–1878, the Muslim population was expelled from the Sanjak of Niš.

Name	1866 census	Share
Ethnicity
Serbs	1,057,540	87%
Vlachs	127,326	10.5%
Romani	25,171	2.1%
Others	5,539	0.5%
Religion
Orthodox	1,205,898	99.20%
Islam	6,498	0.54%
Catholic	4,161	0.31%
Others		0.2%

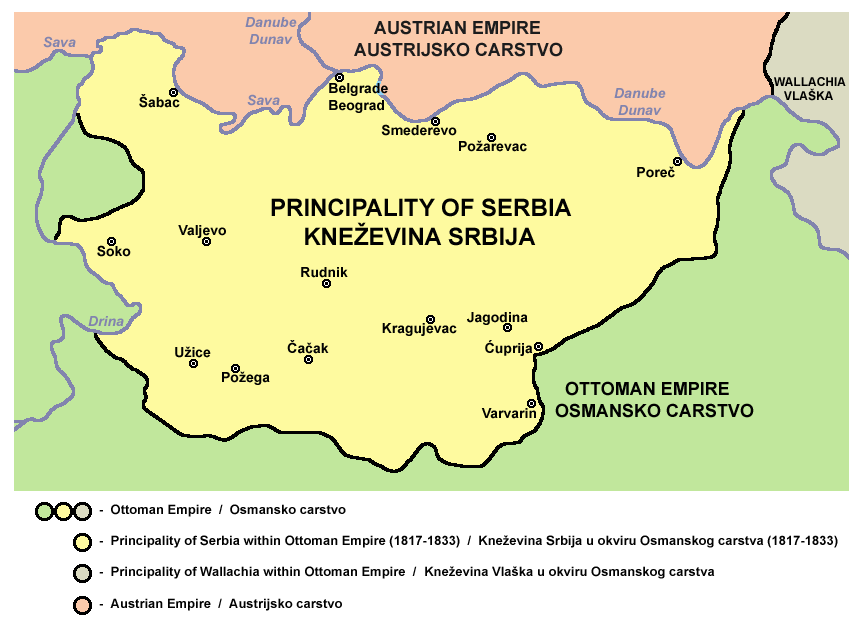
Principality of Serbia in 1817

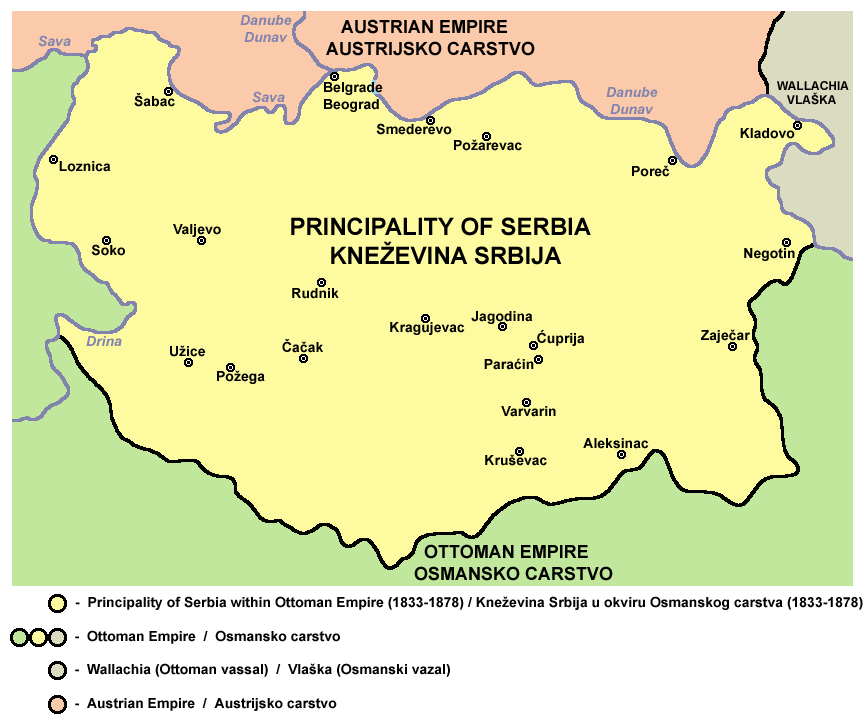
Principality of Serbia in 1833

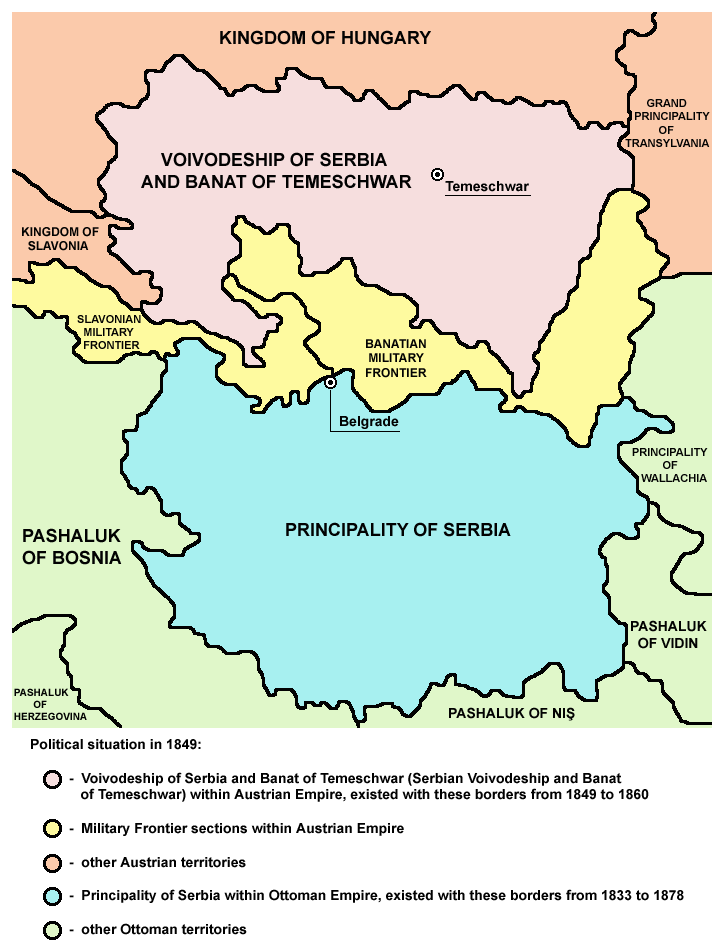
Principality of Serbia from 1833 to 1878

== Princes ==
The Principality was ruled by the House of Obrenović, except for a period under Prince Aleksandar of the House of Karađorđević. Princes Miloš and Mihailo Obrenović each reigned twice.

Portrait	Name	Lifespan	Reign	Notes
	Miloš Obrenović I	17 March 1780 – 26 September 1860	6 November 1817 – 25 June 1839	leader of Second Serbian Uprising.
	Milan Obrenović II	21 October 1819 – 8 July 1839	25 June 1839 – 8 July 1839	eldest son of Prince Miloš. Died at age 19 of tuberculosis.
	Mihailo Obrenović III	16 September 1823 – 10 June 1868	8 July 1839 – 14 September 1842	son of Prince Miloš. Overthrown by the Defenders of the Constitution.
	Alexander Karađorđević	11 October 1806 – 3 May 1885	14 September 1842 – 23 December 1858	youngest son of Karađorđe, the leader of the First Serbian Uprising. Abdicated following loss of popularity.
	Miloš Obrenović I	17 March 1780 – September 1860	23 December 1858 – 26 September 1860	Second reign. Recalled with the Saint Andrew's Day Assembly.
	Mihailo Obrenović III	16 September 1823 – 10 June 1868	26 September 1860 – 10 June 1868	Second reign. Returned from 18-year exile. Assassinated.
	Milan Obrenović IV	22 August 1854 – 11 February 1901	10 June 1868 – 6 March 1882	grandson of Jevrem Obrenović. Elevated to King.

== See also ==
- History of Serbia

== Sources ==
- Milićević, Milan Đ. (1876). Кнежевина Србија: географија, орографија, хидрографија, топографија, аркеологија, историја, етнографија, статистика, просвета, култура, управа [Principality of Serbia]. U državnoj štampariji – via Google Books.
- Pavlowitch, Stevan K. (2002). Serbia: The History behind the Name. London: Hurst & Company. ISBN 9781850654773.
- Petrović, Vukašin J.; Petrović, Nikola K. (1882). "Државна управа". Грађа за Историју Краљевине Србије, време прве владе Кнеза Милоша Обреновића: књига прва, од 1815 до 1821 године. pp. 153-.
