= Constitution of Serbia =

Supreme law of Serbia, in effect since 2006

Constitution of the Republic of Serbia
- Greater coat of arms of Serbia

Overview
- Original title: Устав Републике Србије
- Jurisdiction: Serbia
- Date effective: 8 November 2006
- System: Unitary parliamentary constitutional republic

Government structure
- Branches: 3
- Head of state: President of the Republic
- Chambers: Unicameral (National Assembly)
- Executive: Dual (President of the Republic) (Government)
- Judiciary: Supreme Court
- Last amended: 9 February 2022
- Supersedes: Constitution of 1990

The current Constitution of the Republic of Serbia (Serbian: Устав Републике Србије, Ustav Republike Srbije), also known as Saint Demetrius Day Constitution (Митровдански устав, Mitrovdanski ustav), is the supreme and basic law of Serbia. It was adopted in 2006, replacing the previous constitution dating from 1990.

== History ==
The adoption of current constitution became necessary in 2006 when Serbia restored its independence following Montenegro's secession and the subsequent dissolution of Serbia and Montenegro. The proposed text of the constitution was adopted by the National Assembly on 30 September 2006 and put on constitutional referendum which was held on 28–29 October 2006. After 53% of the electorate voted in favor of the proposed constitution, it was officially adopted on 8 November 2006.

A constitutional referendum was held again on 16 January 2022, in which voters decided on changing the constitution in the provisions related to the judiciary. To bring the judiciary into line with European Union legislation, the Government of Serbia had previously proposed changing the way judges and public prosecutors are elected. After the adoption of constitutional changes, the National Assembly would have less influence on the election of certain judicial factors, such as the president of the Supreme Court, court presidents, public prosecutors, judges, and deputy public prosecutors. The National Assembly would then only elect four members of the High Judicial Council, High Prosecutorial Council, and the Supreme Public Prosecutor. The High Judicial Council would instead get a more important role by electing all judges, while the High Prosecutorial Council would elect prosecutors. The Supreme Court of Cassation's name would also be changed to the Supreme Court and its work would be more regulated. Government officials stated their support for such changes, while the opposition remained divided; most stated their objection to the referendum while some even called for a boycott or for the referendum to be postponed. The "yes" option prevailed over the "no" option in the referendum, although turnout was reported to be the lowest since 1990, at only 30% of voters in total. Constitutional changes were adopted by the National Assembly on 9 February.

=== Constitutional history ===
Serbia was one of the first European countries to adopt a modern constitution in the 19th century, with the 1835 Constitution (also known as the Candlemas Constitution), following Poland (1791), France (1791), Spain (1812), Norway (1814), the Netherlands (1814/1815), and Belgium (1831). This was a significant milestone, as it established Serbia as a pioneer in constitutionalism in Central and Eastern Europe, during a time when most European states lacked formal constitutions.

- Constitution of the Principality of Serbia of 1835, so-called "Candlemas Constitution" (Sretenjski ustav); first modern Serbian constitution
- Constitution of the Principality of Serbia of 1838, so-called "Turkish Constitution" (Turski ustav)
- Constitution of the Principality of Serbia of 1869, so-called "Regents Constitution" (Namesnički ustav)
- Constitution of the Kingdom of Serbia of 1888, so-called "Radical Constitution" (Radikalski ustav)
- Constitution of the Kingdom of Serbia of 1901, so-called "April Constitution" (Aprilski ustav) or "Octroyed Constitution" (Oktroisani ustav)
- Constitution of the Kingdom of Serbia of 1903
- Between 1918 and 1945 Serbia didn't exist as a distinct territorial unit, part of the Kingdom of Yugoslavia.
- Constitution of the People's Republic of Serbia of 1947 (constituent republic of the FPR Yugoslavia).
- Constitution of the Socialist Republic of Serbia of 1963 (constituent republic of the SFR Yugoslavia).
- Constitution of the Socialist Republic of Serbia of 1974 (constituent republic of the SFR Yugoslavia).
- Constitution of the Republic of Serbia of 1990 (constituent republic of the SFR Yugoslavia in 1990–1992 and FR Yugoslavia in 1992–2003 as well as the constituent state of Serbia and Montenegro in 2003–2006)
- Constitution of the Republic of Serbia of 2006, so-called "Saint Demetrius Day Constitution" (Mitrovdanski ustav)
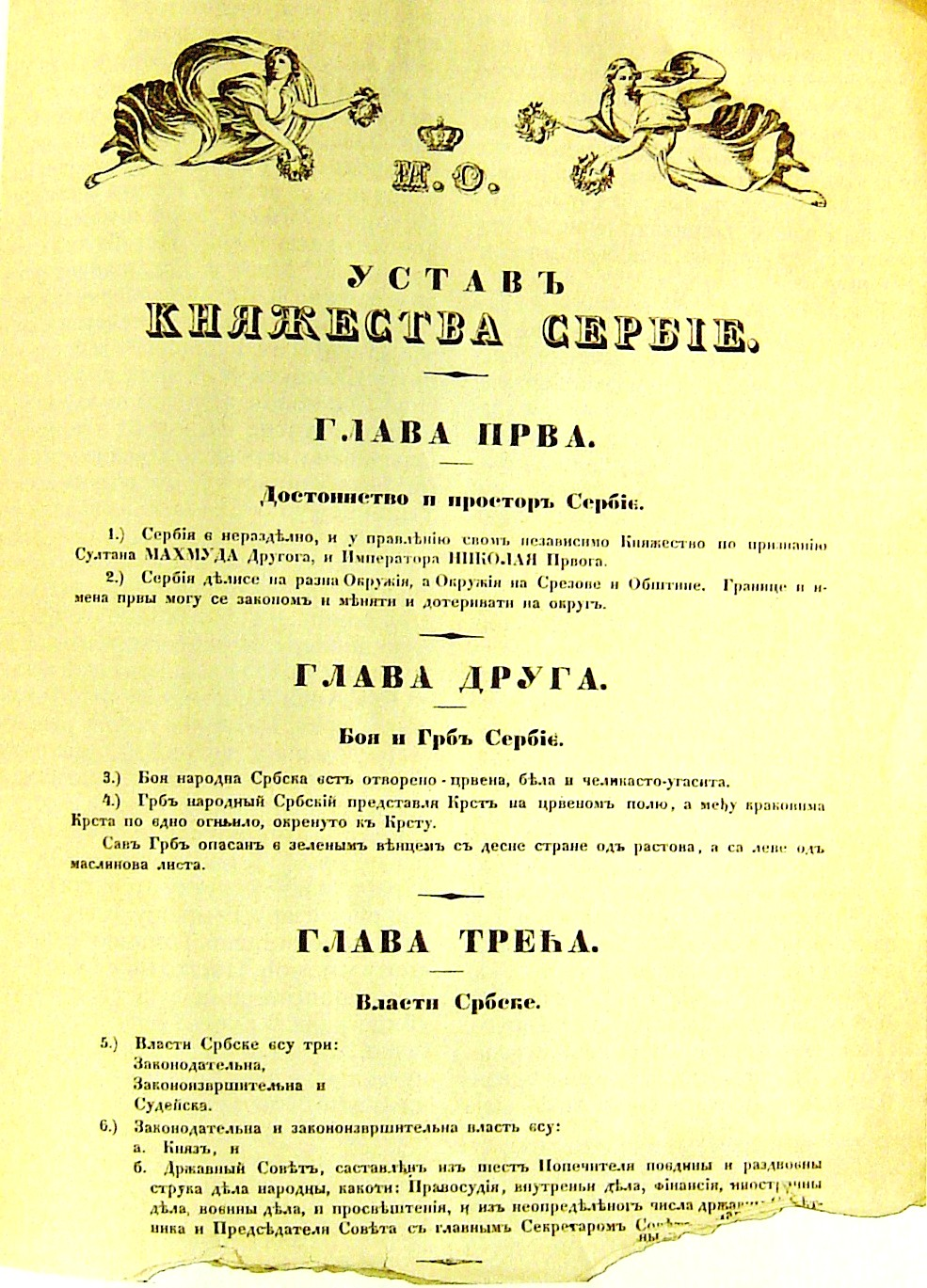
First page of the Constitution of 1835

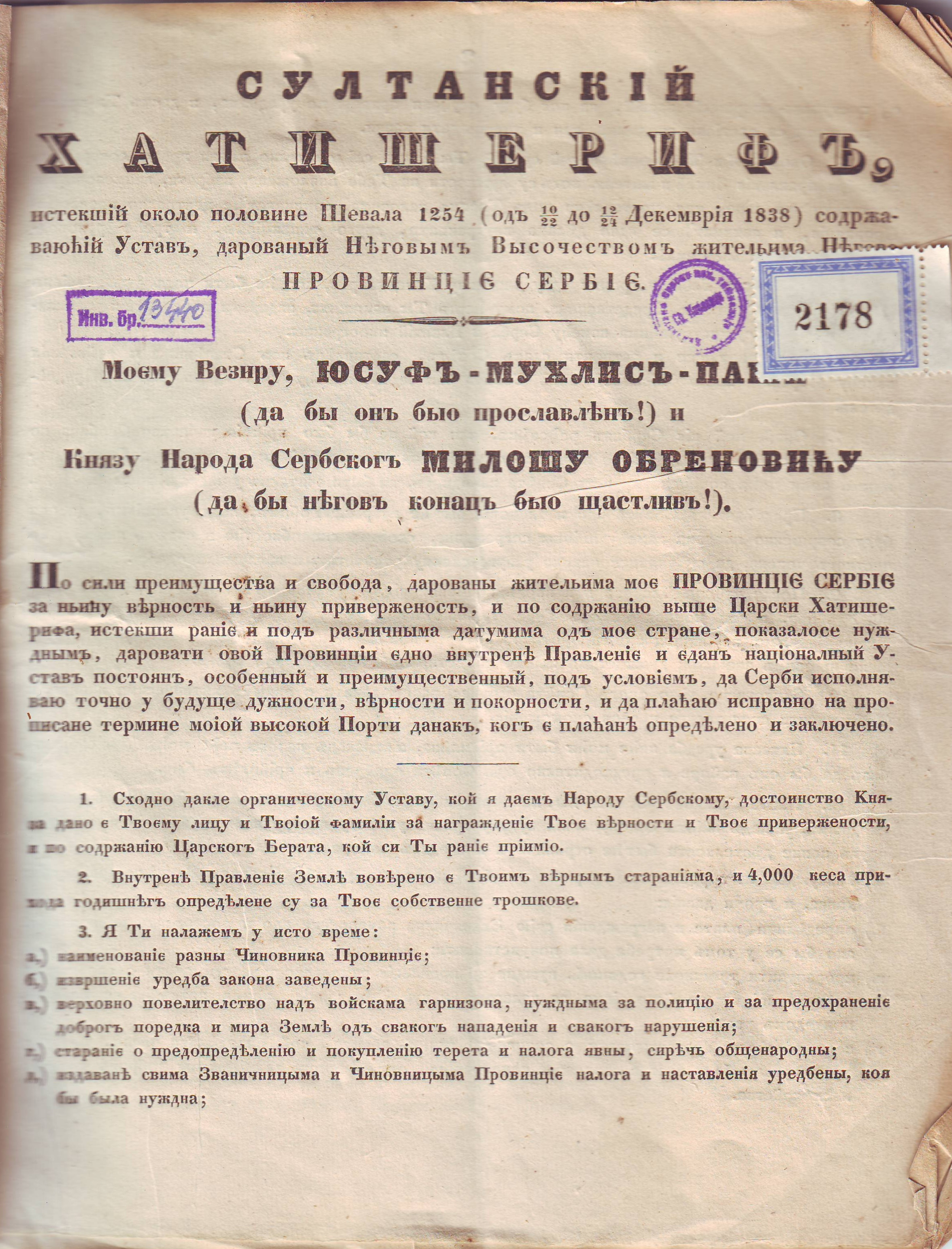
First page of the Constitution of 1838

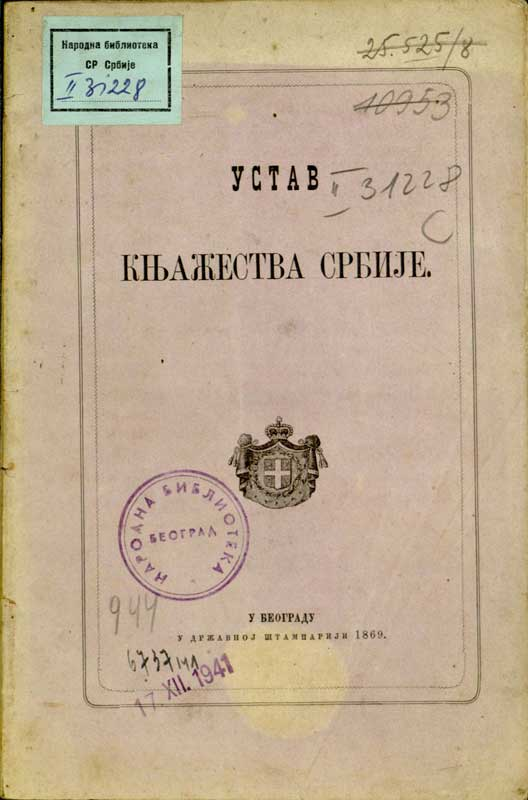
Front page of the Constitution of 1869

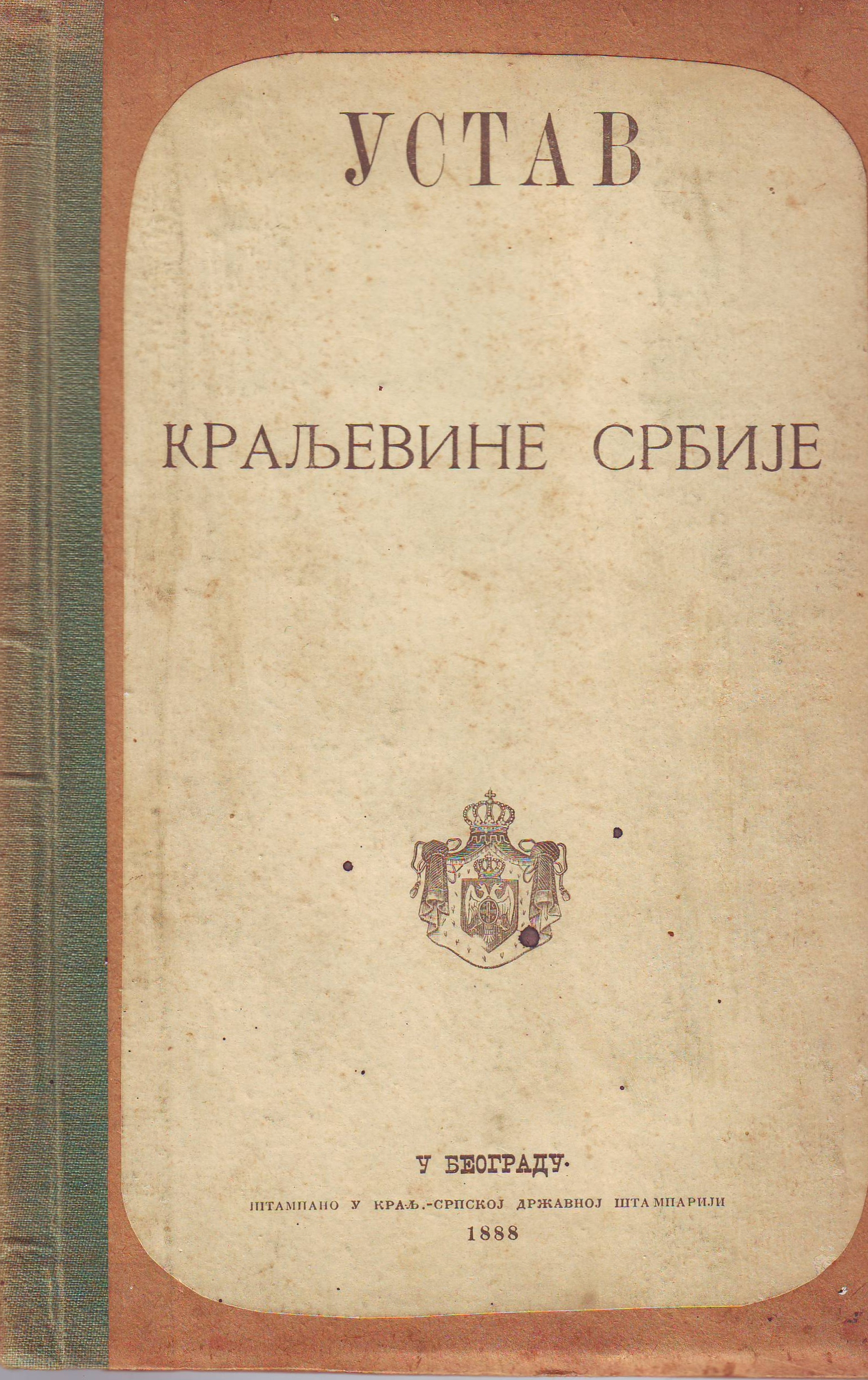
Front page of the Constitution of 1888

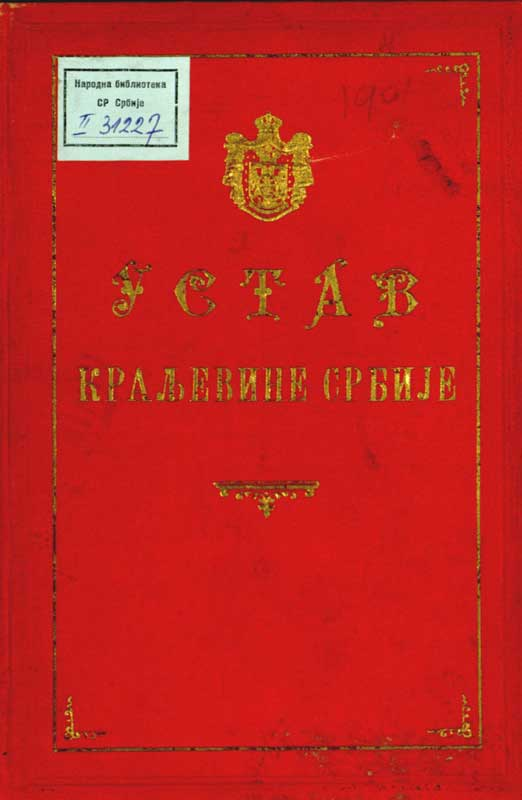
Front page of the Constitution of 1901

== Content ==
The Constitution contains a preamble, 11 chapters, and 206 articles.

=== Preamble ===
The constitution of contains a preamble:

"Considering the state tradition of the Serb people and equality of all citizens and ethnic communities in Serbia,

Considering also that the Province of Kosovo and Metohija is an integral part of the territory of Serbia, that it has the status of a substantial autonomy within the sovereign state of Serbia and that from such status of the Province of Kosovo and Metohija follow constitutional obligations of all state bodies to uphold and protect the state interests of Serbia in Kosovo and Metohija in all internal and foreign political relations,

the citizens of Serbia adopt"

=== Chapters ===
The constitution is divided into 10 chapters:

1. Constitution Principles
2. Human and Minority Rights and Freedoms
3. Economic System and Public Finances
4. Competencies of the Republic of Serbia
5. Organisation of Government
6. The Constitutional Court
7. Territorial Organization
8. Constitutionality and Legality
9. Amending the Constitution
10. Final Provisions

=== New provisions ===
Among the differences between the current and previous constitution are:

- Serbia was for the first time acknowledged as the nation state of the Serb people.
- Serbian language and the Serbian Cyrillic alphabet were assigned as the official language and alphabet in use, respectively.
- State and civil national flags were established.
- Greater and lesser coats of arms were established.
- National anthem, Bože pravde, was adopted.
- High Magistrate Council and High Prosecutorial Council were established, as part of a process of judicial independence.
- Ombudsman was established.
- State Audit Institution was established.
- National Bank of Serbia was granted full independence.
- Private, corporate, and public property were acknowledged; "social assets" ceased to exist.
- Foreign citizens were permitted to own property.
- Province of Vojvodina was granted limited financial autonomy.
- Local municipalities were granted ownership rights, as part of a process of decentralization.
- Capital punishment was explicitly forbidden.
- Human cloning was explicitly forbidden.
- Special protection for the rights of consumers, mothers, children, and minorities, with any new rights achieved since the adoption of the Constitution being entrenched so as that "the attained level of human and minority rights may not be lowered".
- Marriage was defined as the "union between a man and a woman".
- Slavery, indentured servitude, and forced labour were explicitly forbidden, with an exception for voluntary, compensated penal work, conscript service, and during a period of war.

==== Constitutional status of Kosovo ====
The constitution defines the Autonomous Province of Kosovo and Metohija as an integral part of Serbia, but with "substantial autonomy". Under the opinion of the Venice Commission in respect to substantial autonomy of Kosovo, this fundamental autonomy is not at all guaranteed at the constitutional level, as the constitution delegates almost every important aspect of this autonomy to the legislature.

== See also ==
- Constitutional Court of Serbia
- 2006 Serbian constitutional referendum
- 2022 Serbian constitutional referendum
- Law of Serbia
