= Saint Andrew's Day Assembly =

Serbian parliament in session from 1858 to 1859

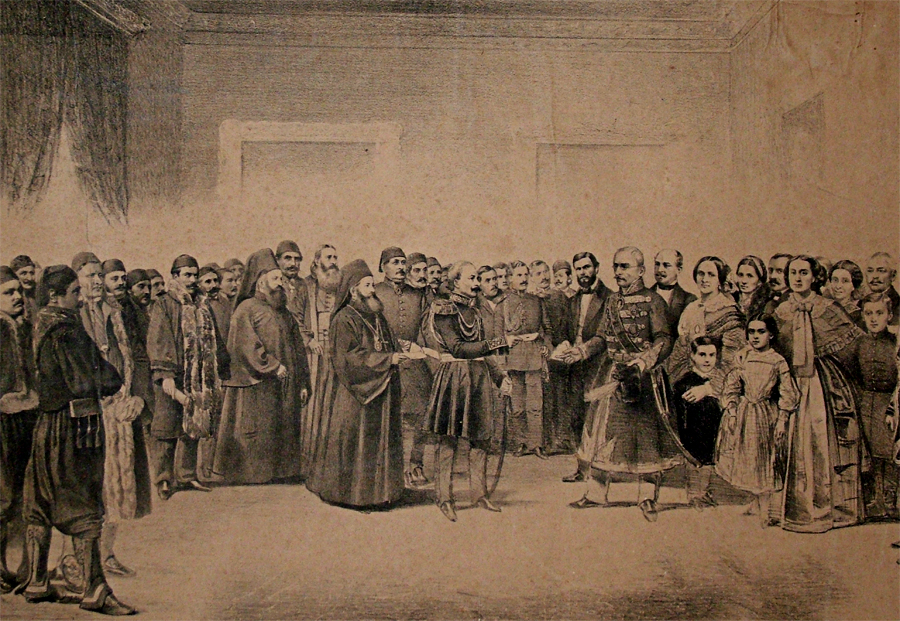
Stanojlo Petrović presents the former and future Prince Miloš Obrenović with the letter of the Saint Andrew's Day Assembly

The Saint Andrew's Day Assembly or the Andermas Assembly (Serbian: Светоандрејска скупштина, romanized: Svetoandrejska skupština) was the name of a Serbian parliament which was in session from 11 December [O.S. 30 November] 1858 (Saint Andrew's Day) to 29 January 1859 in the Great Brewery in Belgrade, Principality of Serbia. There were a total of 432 representatives who were appointed by the Prince and were not elected.

After the Ottoman Empire, the nominal suzerain of the Principality of Serbia at the time, was forced by the Great Powers to implement internal reforms, the then Prince of Serbia Alexander Karađorđević convened parliament due to pressure from domestic opposition. At the end of the 1850s, the monarch was very unpopular, which was exploited by two dominant political groups, the Liberals and the Defenders of the Constitution. At the session of the assembly, the groups proposed for Alexander to abdicate and to invite former Prince Miloš Obrenović (who had previously ruled from 1817 to 1839) to assume the throne again.

== Sources ==
- Ćirković, Sima (2004). The Serbs. Malden: Blackwell Publishing. ISBN 9781405142915.
