= Capital punishment in Serbia =

As of 2022, Europe holds the greatest concentration of abolitionist states (blue). Abolished for all offences Abolished in practice Retains capital punishment

Capital punishment was used from the creation of the modern Serbian state in 1804. On 26 February 2002, the Serbian Parliament adopted amendments striking it off from the Criminal Code. The last execution, by shooting, took place on 14 February 1992, and the last death sentences were given in 2001. Serbia is bound by the Second Optional Protocol to the International Covenant on Civil and Political Rights (ratified on 6 September 2001), and Protocols No. 6 and No. 13 to the European Convention on Human Rights (ratified on 3 March 2004). According to Article 24 of the Serbian constitution (2006): "Human life is inviolable. There shall be no death penalty in the Republic of Serbia".

== History ==
=== Serbia, 1804–1914 ===
In the first decades of the 19th century, the death penalty was widely used in Serbia for a variety of offenses: murder, theft, political crimes, infanticide and even for extramarital sexual relations.

Until 1858, different modes of execution were in use: shooting, hanging, breaking on the wheel, „lethal gauntlet“ (a double file of men facing each other and armed with birch rods with which to strike at a person who is made to run between them) and decapitation; in the very beginning, there were a few instances of impalement. Until 1842, murderers were subject to „mirror“ punishments, meaning that a murderer was to be killed in an identical manner in which he killed the victim (often with the same weapon). In addition, the bodies of executed offenders were almost always publicly displayed on wheels and kept there for a set period of time or until „complete decay“. In 1858, shooting became the only legal mode of execution, while the practice of displaying the bodies was discontinued.

Under the first Serbian Penal Code, passed in 1860, the death sentences were to be executed in public, by shooting, while the executed body was to be buried immediately at the place of execution. The Code included sixteen capital offenses: various forms of murder and robbery leading to death, as well as treason. In 1863, however, the death penalty was re-introduced for theft and certain other crimes. The death penalty for theft was finally abolished only in 1902. In 1905, executions in Belgrade ceased to be public (the offenders were shot furtively in places not frequented by public), but they remained public (until 1930) in other towns and in the country, where thousands of spectators gathered for the spectacle.

Regular statistics on capital punishment began to be kept in 1889. Before that, reliable data exist for some years only. For example, in 1844 there were 62 death sentences (and 50 executions), in 1857 – 87 (10), 1868 – 64 (36) and in 1887 – 34 (23). In 1883, the year of a massive rebellion against the government (Timočka buna), 117 persons (mostly rebels) were sentenced to death and 47 executed. According to the official statistics, in the 25 years from 1889 to 1914 there were 600 death sentences and 344 executions.

=== Yugoslavia, 1918–1941 ===
When Yugoslavia was created in 1918, different legal systems remained in force in different parts of the new country. In the north-western provinces (Bosnia and Herzegovina, Croatia, Slovenia and Vojvodina), executions were by hanging in an enclosed space with restricted public attendance. In the remainder of the country (Serbia, Kosovo, Montenegro and Macedonia), executions were by shooting and in public. When a single Penal Code was introduced for the whole country (1929), hanging remained the only legal mode of execution, with the exception of sentences passed by military courts, which were executed by shooting.

Crimes punished by death were mostly murder and robbery leading to death, as well as terrorism. The terrorists sentenced to death were mainly the communists and the Croatian, Macedonian and Albanian separatists.

According to the official statistics, there were 459 death sentences and 232 executions in Serbia from 1920 to 1940 (on average, 22 sentences and 11 executions per year). In the same period, in the whole of Yugoslavia there were 904 sentences and 291 executions (43 and 14 per year).

Hangings were performed by state executioners: Alois Seyfried (1918-1922), Florian Mausner (1922-1928) and Karlo Dragutin Hart (1928-1941).

=== Yugoslavia, 1945–1991 ===
In the first years after World War II, death sentences were passed in large numbers daily on collaborationists and war criminals, but also on the „enemies of the people“, i.e. all those who opposed the new communist regime. There are no reliable data, but it seems likely that in Yugoslavia until 1951 there were as many as 10,000 death sentences, a majority of which were executed. In the same period, there must have been several thousands of death sentences and executions in Serbia. In addition to political offenses, capital crimes included the theft of the government property, as well as aggravated murder and robbery. Until 1959, executions were either by shooting or by hanging, as determined by the sentence of the court in each individual case, although hangings were considered as an aggravated form and were used less frequently. In the first post-war years, executions of major war criminals were often public. After 1950, the number of death sentences fell sharply. According to the official statistics, from 1950 to 1958 there were 229 death sentences in Yugoslavia (ca. 29 p.a.) and 122 in Serbia (ca. 15 p.a.). No official data were published on executions, but it is safe to assume that about two thirds of all death sentences were executed.

The 1959 reforms resulted in a less strict system of criminal justice. Number of capital offenses was reduced and capital punishment was abolished for property offenses. Hanging was abolished and the only legal mode of execution remained shooting, performed by a platoon of eight policemen, only half of whom had rifles loaded with live ammunition. Executions could not be performed publicly. From 1959 to 1991, there were, on average, two or three executions per year in Yugoslavia and about two in Serbia (over 70% of all death sentences in Yugoslavia were passed by courts in Serbia).

=== Serbia after 1991 ===
From April 1992, Serbia was a part of the Federal Republic of Yugoslavia, which consisted of two federal units – Serbia and Montenegro. From 1991 to 2002, Serbian courts passed 19 death sentences, none of which had been executed. On 14 February 1992, Johan Drozdek was executed in Sombor. He was sentenced to death in 1988 for rape and murder of a six-year-old girl.

== Abolition ==
=== Early attempts ===
In 1826, poet Sima Milutinović Sarajlija (1791–1847) wrote to Prince Miloš Obrenović, advising him to abolish the death penalty. The Prince never received the letter and nothing came out of the poet’s project. During the drafting of the Penal Code in 1858, a law professor and a judge Jovan Filipović (1819–1876) proposed an abolition of capital punishment, arguing that it was unconstitutional under the then Serbian constitution. His proposal was rejected by a majority vote in the Drafting Committee. In January 1881, deputies of the People's Radical Party made two motions to completely abolish the death penalty in the Serbian Parliament, but both were rejected by a majority vote. A similar motion, although restricted to an abolition for political crimes only, was made in the Parliament in 1887 and was also rejected. A committee appointed to draft a new constitution for Serbia in 1888 held a debate on the death penalty, but the motion to abolish it was rejected. Another parliamentary debate was held in 1906, with the same result. Among those who spoke against capital punishment was the then minister of justice, Milenko Vesnić.

In the parliamentary debates on the draft constitution for the newly created Yugoslavia in 1921, the leftist parties (Communists and Republicans), as well as several smaller parties from Slovenia and Croatia, called for an abolition of the death penalty, but the majority decided to keep it in the constitution. In 1926, women’s organizations in Yugoslavia, headed by the Popular Union of Women (Narodni ženski savez), demanded abolition of capital punishment "for women as well as for men".

Marxists scholars, gathered around the Praxis journal, proposed an abolition of the death penalty in 1963. In 1980, a Belgrade lawyer Srđa M. Popović submitted a petition to the Yugoslav authorities to abolish the death penalty. A Society Against the Death Penalty was founded in Belgrade in 1981, but the authorities refused to allow it. In 1983, more than a thousand Yugoslav citizens, mostly from Slovenia, signed a petition to the federal parliament calling for an abolition of capital punishment.

=== Partial abolition, 1992 ===
Constitution of FR Yugoslavia (which consisted of Serbia and Montenegro), adopted on 25 April 1992, abolished capital punishment for federal crimes (including genocide, war crimes, political and military offenses), but the federal units kept the right to prescribe capital punishment for crimes under their jurisdiction (murder and robbery).

=== Final abolition, 2002 ===
On 26 February 2002, the Serbian parliament amended Serbia's Penal Code by deleting from it all references to capital punishment. As was stressed in the parliamentary debate, a paramount motive for this abolition was the intention of the then FR Yugoslavia to join the Council of Europe. At the time of the abolition, there were 12 people in Serbia on death row. Their sentence was commuted to 40 years in prison, the highest possible sentence after death, since Serbia didn't have a life imprisonment sentence at the time.

In 2006, new Constitution of Serbia was adopted. Article 24 of the Constitution explicitly forbids enactment of capital punishment.

== Public opinion ==
In the Fall of 2001, shortly before the Serbian abolition, a study of attitudes to the death penalty, based on a poll of 926 citizens, found the respondents to be equally divided: 43% were for the death penalty and 43% were against it, with 14% undecided. Subsequent polls, taken every year since 2007 on a representative sample of around 1,000 citizens, confirm this result. Those for and those against capital punishment remain equally divided with minor year-to-year variations, like a seesaw: one year a majority of a few per cent would be for, and the next against the death penalty (see Table below).

This has changed since 2012 where every year a majority support the death penalty.

Year	Against death penalty (%)	For death penalty (%)
2002	50	50
2007	56	44
2008	48	52
2009	52	48
2010	47	53
2011	53	47
2012	49	51
2013 (March)	43	57
2013 (September)	47	53
2014	30	70
2015	38	62
2016	30	70
2017	32	68
2018	30	70
2019	30	70
2020	36	64
2021	31	69
2022	33	67

== Executions since 1959 ==
Source: SPSK Database

Executed person	Gender	Date of sentence	Date of execution	Place of execution	Crime	Method	Ref.
Mileva Krivokapić	Female	26 June 1959	1960	Leskovac	double child murder	firing squad	
Ramo Bunakai	Male	1959	1960	Peć	spying and murder	firing squad	
Ilija Jojin	Male	8 March 1960	18 July 1961	Belgrade	double murder	firing squad	
Stevan Narandžić	Male	1961	1961	Sremska Mitrovica	double murder	firing squad	
Krum Cekov	Male	23 October 1961	15 June 1962	Požarevac	murder	firing squad	
Esad Ribić	Male	14 June 1962	1963	Sombor	murder of a police officer	firing squad	
Milivoje Stević	Male	25 July 1962	22 January 1963	Sremska Mitrovica	murder of a police officer	firing squad	
Vojislav Smiljanić	Male	25 July 1962	22 January 1963	Sremska Mitrovica	murder of a police officer	firing squad	
Mihalj Cekuš	Male	21 February 1963	30 September 1963	Subotica	triple murder	firing squad	
Sedija Tači	Male	1962	1963	Niš	murder in prison while serving sentence for double murder	firing squad	
Aleksandar Jovanović	Male	1 October 1962	30 September 1963	Valjevo	child murder	firing squad	
Mladen Domanović	Male	23 November 1962	1963	Sremska Mitrovica	murder of cell mate while in prison for previous murder	firing squad	
Živko Mladenović	Male	1963	1963	Prokuplje	murder	firing squad	
Sadija Beftija	Male	1963	1964	Priština	murder	firing squad	
Vukomir Dojčinović	Male	1964	24 February 1965	Niš	triple murder	firing squad	
Eva Vanjur	Female	23 April 1964	8 November 1965	Subotica	child murder	firing squad	
Božo Stadinović	Male	7 May 1965	1966	Sremska Mitrovica	homicide during a robbery	firing squad	
Ivan Jelić	Male	25 July 1968	3 November 1968	Belgrade	terrorism	firing squad	
Dragoljub Gutić	Male	30 May 1968	27 February 1969	Belgrade	homicide during a robbery	firing squad	
Sava Lisovac	Male	30 May 1968	27 February 1969	Belgrade	homicide during a robbery	firing squad	
Janko Marković	Male	18 February 1969	28 January 1970	Zaječar	double murder	firing squad	
Teufik Kapetanović	Male	3 November 1969	1970	Niš	homicide during a robbery	firing squad	
Janoš Kočiš	Male	1971	1971	Novi Sad	murder	firing squad	
Vince Kišđeri	Male	27 October 1970	1972	Novi Sad	double murder	firing squad	
Hilmija Hajrulahu	Male	29 October 1970	1972	Gnjilane	murder	firing squad	
Alija Elezi	Male	15 August 1971	1972	Gnjilane	murder	firing squad	
Milun Jovanović	Male	20 April 1972	13 December 1972	Novi Pazar	triple murder	firing squad	
Nebih Prenići	Male	28 January 1970	13 June 1973	Priština	double murder	firing squad	
Stipan Tumbas	Male	22 March 1973	15 August 1974	Subotica	child murder	firing squad	
Aleksandar Milutinović	Male	10 November 1971	4 September 1974	Belgrade	multiple murder	firing squad	
Jezdimir Gajić	Male	8 March 1973	16 May 1975	Požarevac	multiple murder	firing squad	
Hasan Kajtazović	Male	18 April 1974	1976?	Niš	double murder	firing squad	
Milan Sekulić	Male	13 June 1974	19 March 1976	Belgrade	murder of a police officer	firing squad	
Ahmet Zogaj	Male	19 June 1972	1976	Prizren	double child murder	firing squad	
Bali Zogaj	Male	19 June 1972	1976	Prizren	double child murder	firing squad	
Ali Haliti	Male	21 March 1975	1977	Priština	murder	firing squad	
Isljam Đota	Male	11 October 1974	1977	Priština	double murder	firing squad	
Mejdi Ljamalari	Male	3 February 1974	1977	Gnjilane	double murder	firing squad	
Nedeljko Grujičić	Male	5 April 1974	5 January 1977	Užice	double murder	firing squad	
Miljenko Hrkać	Male	25 December 1975	11 January 1978	Belgrade	terrorism	firing squad	
Avdija Seferaj	Male	11 November 1977	12 December 1979	Požarevac	killed four inmates during a prison riot	firing squad	
Mustafa Milaim	Male	11 November 1977	12 December 1979	Požarevac	killed four inmates during a prison riot	firing squad	
Zumber Haliti	Male	9 December 1975	1977	Požarevac	triple murder	firing squad	
Dimitrije Gavrilović	Male	21 April 1978	20 April 1979	Novi Sad	murder of two police officers	firing squad	
Nebojša Despotov	Male	4 March 1976	12 July 1979	Zrenjanin	double murder	firing squad	
Vojislav Rajčić	Male	1 April 1980	16 March 1981	Zaječar	war crimes	firing squad	
Đemšit Braha	Male	7 November 1979	22 October 1981	Priština	double murder	firing squad	
Hamit Azizi	Male	1982	4 January 1982		murder	firing squad	
Paljoka Gecaj	Male	1982	5 April 1982	Peć	revenge murder (blood feud)	firing squad	
Ferat Muja	Male	28 July 1982	25 April 1984	Titova Mitrovica	murder	firing squad	
Tefik Abazi	Male	1984	22 July 1987	Priština	triple murder	firing squad	
Ahmet Pačarizi	Male	11 August 1983	20 November 1987	Prizren	murder of two police officers	firing squad	
Laslo Egete	Male	4 April 1986	29 July 1988	Subotica	child murder	firing squad	
Laslo Tubičak	Male	30 March 1988	8 August 1989	Novi Sad	murder of a police officer	firing squad	
Johan Drozdek	Male	15 March 1988	14 February 1992	Sombor	child murder	firing squad	
