= 1869 Constitution of Serbia =

Constitution of Serbia

Constitution of the Principality of Serbia
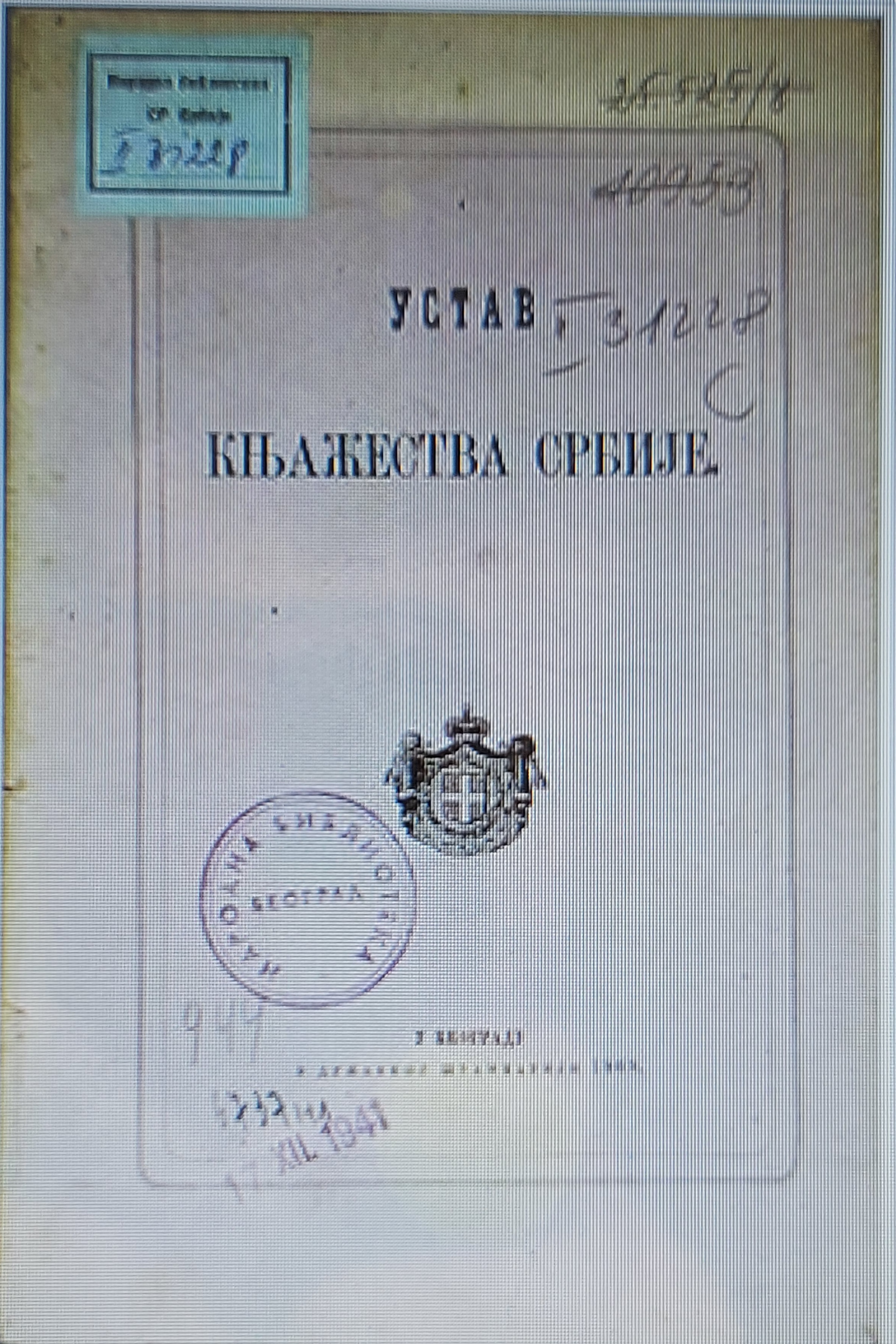

Overview
- Jurisdiction: Principality of Serbia
- Ratified: 29 June 1869
- Date effective: 1869–1888, 1894–1901
- Supersedes: 1838 Constitution of Serbia

The Constitution of the Principality of Serbia from 1869 (also known as the Regency Constitution) was the third constitution of Serbia that replaced the old Turkish constitution from 1838. It was adopted by the Great National Assembly on July 11, 1869, and the constitution was in force in two periods: 1869–1888 and 1894–1901. The most important provisions of the Constitution from 1869 are devoted to the position and competences of the National Assembly, which, for the first time in the history of Serbian state law, became a legislative body.

The adoption of this constitution, even though Serbia was not yet a sovereign country, was not opposed by the Ottoman Empire, nominal sovereign of Serbia, nor by the great powers. Since it was adopted by the Regency when Мilan Obrenović was a minor, it is also called the Regency Constitution.

== Background ==
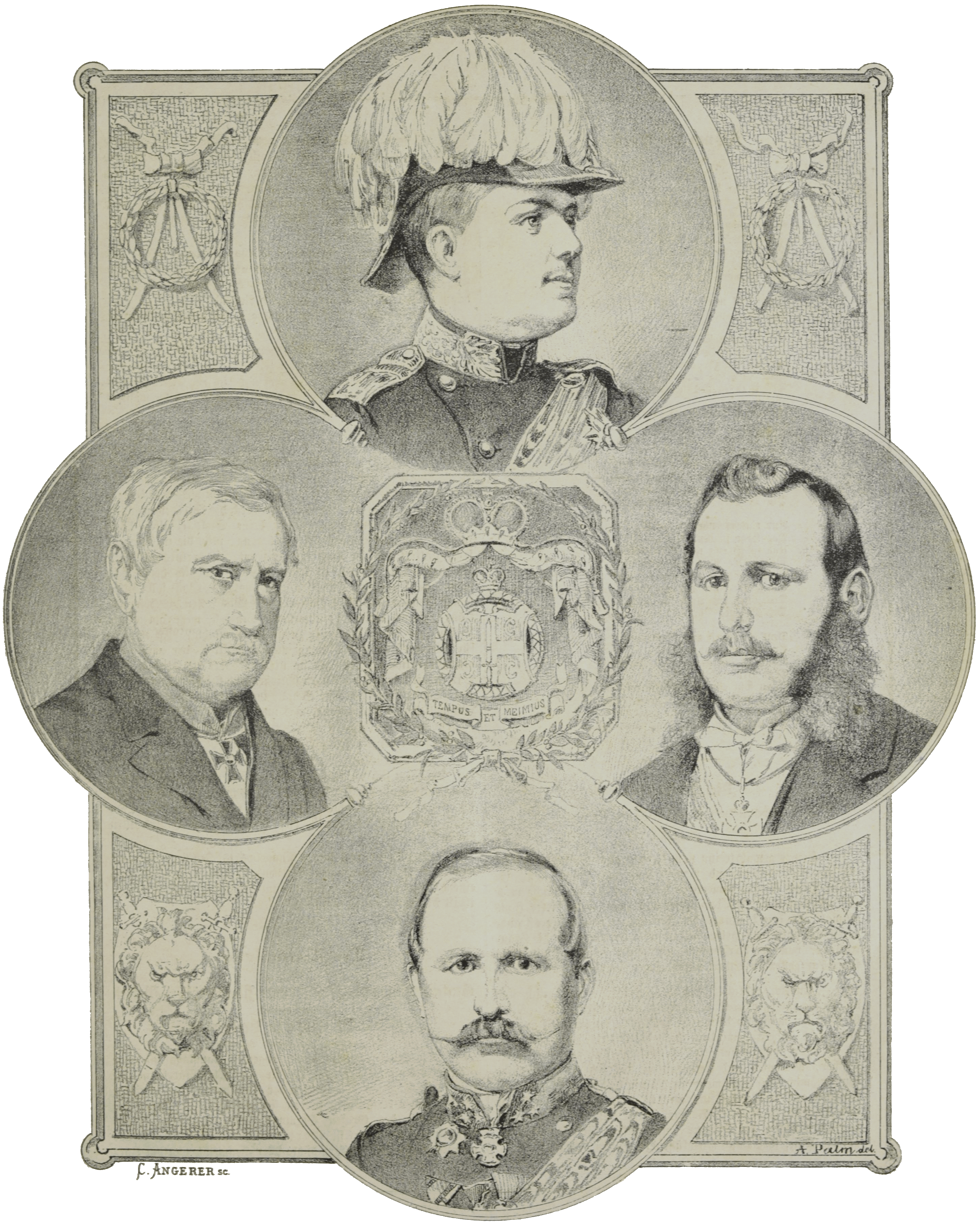
Prince Milan and members of the Regency Jovan Gavrilović. Jovan Ristić and Milivoje Petrović Blaznavac

In the period 1839–1869, which represents the period of formal rule of the Turkish Constitution, two fundamentally different constitutional orders were replaced. The first was the period of the rule of the Defenders of the Constitution, during which the organization of the supreme state authority as well as the arrangement of broader, primarily social and economic relations, were in truth established on the principles of the Turkish Constitution. The second period coincides with the period of the second rule of Prince Mihailo Obrenović and is marked by important changes in the constitutional system in Serbia.

After the abdication of Мiloš Obrenović and the first ascension to the throne of his son Mihailo, the position of the defender of the constitution strengthened considerably. Their most prominent representatives from the ranks of merchant class and high aristocracy– Toma Vučić Perišić, Аvram Petronijević, Ilija Garašanin, Simić brothers–fought, primarily, for the preservation of freedoms recognized by the constitution in economic relations and especially for free trade.

Vučić's rebellion of 1842 resulted in the overthrow of the Obrenović dynasty and, on September 1, 1842, the election of Alexander Karađorđević as the new Prince of Serbia.

However, constant conflicts between the prince and the Council led to the convening of the Saint Andrew's Day Assembly in December 1858, where Miloš Obrenović was restored to the throne in place of the deposed Alexander Karađorđević.

The change in the Constitution from 1838, the inheritance of the princely dignity, and the emigration of the Turkish population from the cities, are the basic characteristics of Miloš's political program after his accession to the throne of Serbia. But less than two years, which was the duration of Miloš's second reign, were not enough for the prince to resolve these issues. After Miloš's death, the title of prince is again inherited by Mihailo, whose plan was to strengthen his position in power through reforms and thereby prevent the influence of opposition groups and the interference of the Porte. By creating a national army and forging alliances with Christian nations in the Balkans, he aimed for the final overthrow of Turkish power in this part of Europe.

With the second government of Prince Mihailo, Serbia enters a new chapter of its constitutional life. The question of changing the Turkish constitution was the most significant in the legislative activity of the new prince. In his proclamation upon ascension to the throne, he declares that "the law is the highest will in Serbia". Nikola Hristić writes about this in his memoirs:

Prince Mihailo and his government, seriously considered the idea of issuing a new constitution. But this intention could not be realized. In Paris and Petrograd, where we expressed this intention, we were advised not to issue a new constitution in its true form because, by doing so, we could provoke the Porte against us, and the circumstances of the time dictated that we should not come into conflict with it because of this. Instead, we could issue certain basic laws, regardless of the existing Turkish constitution, which we would thus render null and void.

The Porte did not agree to Serbia's independent adoption of the constitution, and because of this, Prince Mihailo, at the persuasion of the great powers, passed laws that changed the legal position of the supreme authorities provided for in the Turkish Constitution.

The laws by which Prince Mihailo changed the provisions of the Constitution of 1838 to the greatest extent were as follows:

The structure of the State Council dated August 17, 1861, by which the advisers were placed in the same order as other officials, which enabled the prince to retire the independent advisers until then;

The reign of Prince Alexander Karađorđević was marked by frequent conflicts between the prince and the Soviet (State Council). After Тenka's conspiracy in 1857, Prince Alexander dismissed the Soviet (State Council) without the approval of the Porte. The Soviet complained about it, and after Etem Pasha's mission, the prince was forced to retract his decisions. The powers of the prince in terms of appointing and replacing councilors were reduced in comparison to his earlier powers by the changes to the organization of the Soviet from May 1858. After the Saint Andrew's Day Assembly at the end of 1858 and the return of Miloš Obrenović to power, the Soviet began to lose power.

Organization of the Central State Administration in the Principality of Serbia from March 12, 1862, which increased the number of ministries to seven (three new ministries were formed: education, construction, and military), and the ministers were completely separated from the council and subordinated only to the prince. The same law introduced the Council of Ministers for the first time, which had the task of uniting ministries in deciding on legal projects in other matters of importance for the entire country;

The Law on the National Assembly dated August 17, 1861. which introduces the difference between a grand and an ordinary assembly (the grand assembly is four times larger than the ordinary assembly in terms of the number of deputies and meets for the purpose of electing the prince, approving the adoption of the heir to the throne, or determining the regency during the time prince is under age). According to this law, the Assembly is an exclusively advisory body that has the right to be heard in certain cases.

The following laws were also significant:

Law on civil servants of March 24, 1861 (later replaced by the law of February 15, 1864);

Law on the Organization of Municipalities and Municipal Authorities of March 24, 1866;

Organization of the state military from August 1861.

While Prince Mihailo Obrenović was establishing absolutism in the country, a conspiracy was formed against him with the aim of killing him. The conspirators assassinated the prince on May 29, 1868 in Košutnjak, not far from the Hajduk fountain. Prince Mihailo had no legitimate children. The throne remained vacant, and the election of the ruler was the responsibility of the National Assembly. Before its convening, the day after the Topčider assassination, the Minister of War, Milivoje Petrović Blaznavac, with the help of the army in a coup d'état, declared Milan Obrenović (1854–1901), the fourteen-year-old grandson of Miloš's brother Jevrem, as the new prince. The only thing left for the National Assembly was to appoint a new ruler, who returned from Paris, where he had been studying, in June 1868. Under heavy pressure and surrounded by the army, the Great National Assembly met on July 2, 1868, where it proclaimed a minor, Milan Obrenović as a prince and elected Regents. That assembly demanded radical reforms, i.e., it asked for the extension of parliamentary power, the introduction of accountability for ministers, freedom of the press, and trial by jury. Upon coming to power, the Regents cautiously promised political reforms that would strengthen the influence of the National Assembly. The former opposition and public opinion were in favor of the reform, and only the conservatives opposed the political reforms.

== Regency ==
The underage prince was assigned a regency, which included Milivoje Petrović Blaznavac, Jovan Ristić and Jovan Gavrilović. Ristić, a capable official and diplomat, soon stood out as a leading figure among the Regents. Under his influence, changes occurred in the internal politics of the country, which marked a moderate liberalization of the political situation. The Regency reached a political compromise on this with the liberals, who transitioned from being persecuted opponents of the government during Mihailo's time to now becoming part of it. They agreed to moderate some of their reform demands (parliamentarism modeled on Western democracies, strong local self-government, freedom of the press and assembly, etc.) in exchange for breaking with the previous absolutism and gradually introducing political freedoms. The Regency, as the most important act during its mandate, adopted a new constitution.

== Nicholas Committee ==
A few months after the assassination, the Regency began drafting a new constitution. They raised the issue of the constitution against the provisions of the National Assembly Act of 1861, which prohibited changes to the constitution while the prince was underage. They did this because they considered that the existing status of the constitution, with the Turkish Constitution and the changes made by Prince Mihailo's constitutional legislation, was unsustainable. For this purpose, in December 1868, on Saint Nicholas Day, the Constitutional Committee, which was called the Nicholas Committee, was convened, consisting of over seventy people. The work of this committee, which gathered 76 members and whose president and deputy were Prime Minister Đorđe Cenić and Minister of Internal Affairs Radivoje Milojković, concluded on December 19.

In fact, the committee's task was to answer the question of whether it was necessary and whether it was time to give the country a constitution. With an affirmative answer (everyone agreed except Jovan Ilić) to that question, the committee considered the following questions of a constitutional nature: whether the national representation will be unicameral or bicameral; whether ministers should be held accountable for their work and how; should freedom of the press be allowed? The Regency advocated that the National Assembly, which until then had only an advisory role, be recognized as a legislative authority, but they demanded that the Council not be abolished, thus creating a bicameral system exist. The issue was also how to arrange the legislative power, and the Nicholas Committee was in favor of a bicameral system, but between the Regency and the committee there were disagreements regarding the organization of the upper house, i.e. Council.

The Regency proposed that the Council members be chosen by the government, but the committee opposed it, considering that these advisers would be dependent on the government. In particular, Aćim Čumić, Milan Piroćanac and Đorđe Pavlović opposed that proposal of appointed Council members. Čumić pointed out that if the council is to be the authority in charge of supervising the government, then it must be independent from the government. He also believed that councilors should be independent from the people in such a way that they would be elected for life. The liberals were afraid of Čumić's vision of the council, believing that it could grow into an oligarchy, so they asked for councilors with a temporary mandate, elected by the people. The Regency raised the issue of ministerial accountability and the issue of freedom of the press to the Nicholas Committee, and they almost agreed on that, but they believed that the freedom of the press should not be left without restrictions and also that the accountability of ministers should be limited to some extent so that they would not be constantly afraid of lawsuits. The draft of the constitution itself was drawn up after the meeting of the Nicholas Committee in a small circle of several members of the government and Regency, among whom Ristić was the most active. The Constitution was adopted at the Great National Assembly that convened in Kragujevac from June 10 to June 29, 1869. This longest-lasting Serbian constitution of the 19th century was also the first constitution that Serbia adopted independently.

== Diplomatic interference and Regencies highhandedness ==
Since the Regency and the Nicholas Committee were in favor of changing the constitution, a diplomatic effort was also needed since the Ottoman Empire considered that the Serbian constitution was within its rights. At the time, Serbia had the Turkish constitution from 1838. The Regency first convinced Austria and Russia that a change in the constitution was needed in order to put the Ottomans in front of a fait accompli. There was also an obstacle in the Serbian legislation itself because the Assembly Law stated that no constitutional change could be proposed during the Regency. That law was supposed to prevent the Regency from expanding their power during the time that the prince was underage. The Regency then explained in the newspaper that such an article of the law could be changed by ordinary legislative procedure, but they did not carry out that change until the adoption of the Regency Constitution in 1869, which later caused claims that the Regency Constitution was adopted in an irregular manner. The Constitution was supposed to be adopted by the council, and in that process the Assembly was only supposed to be heard, but that did not work for the Regency, so on June 7, 1869, it asked the council to approve that the Constitution be adopted by the Great National Assembly. Given that he was brought before the fait accompli (the Regency ordered the Minister of the Interior to convene the Grand National Assembly on Vidovdan on June 28, 1869, in Kragujevac), the Council did not offer much resistance.

== Adoption of the constitution ==
Disregarding the formal vassal position of Serbia in relation to Turkey and the provisions of the Law on the National Assembly, which prohibited the change of the constitution when the prince was underage, the Regency made a decision to initiate the procedure for the adoption of a new constitution. The Great National Assembly adopted the Constitution on June 29, 1869. Neither the Porte nor the great powers reacted with opposition to the adoption of the constitution.

=== Method of passing and reforming the constitution ===
The Constitution was adopted by the Great National Assembly, but it came to power only after it was signed by "Regents of the Princely Dignity", "which clearly showed that the Assembly did not represent the constitutional authority". That is why the Regency Constitution falls under the category of constitutional pacts (constitutional contracts) by means of adoption. It is the first Serbian constitution written in the Ekavian dialect and Vuk's orthography, while the language of the constitution is precise and clear.

The Regency Constitution was changed according to the system of the Constitutional Pact. The constitution recognized the institution of the Great National Assembly (it was four times larger than the regular Assembly), which, in addition to amending the constitution, had the authority to make decisions on other issues "of extraordinary importance for the country" when the prince found it necessary to listen to the Great National Assembly. The proposal on the necessity to make any amendments or additions to the constitution or to interpret some of its provisions could be proposed both by the prince to the Assembly and by the Assembly to the prince. The procedure for reforming the constitution was complex: the amendment proposal had to be adopted by a two-thirds majority of the present members of the regular National Assembly, after which the two following regular Assemblies had to agree with it, so that in the end the final decision on the proposed reform would be made by the Great National Assembly and confirmed by the prince.

== Contents of the Constitution ==
=== State polity ===
The constitution established that Serbia is a "hereditary constitutional monarchy with popular representation". It did not introduce a parliamentary system of government because there was no rule on the political accountability of ministers before the National Assembly. That is why "Serbia was not a country with a parliamentary system but a representative system, a dualistic, German-type system." Slobodan Jovanović calls the period of application of the Regency Constitution "the age of constitutionality".

The introduction of the National Assembly into the ranks of central state bodies and the appointment of the people's representative to the place that the State Council had in earlier constitutions was a big step forward compared to the previous state and a significant move towards the introduction of a parliamentary system. Although not explicitly outlined in the Constitution, the principle of separation of powers was implemented between the prince, the National Assembly, and independent courts.

=== Organization of government ===
The central political authorities were the prince and the National Assembly. There was also a Government, which was appointed and dismissed by the prince. The judiciary branch was independent. The State Council was retained as a constitutional body, but its character was completely changed, so instead of legislative and executive functions, it was given the function of an administrative court, similar to the French State Council. The National Assembly became a legislative body for the first time in the history of Serbian state law, but it did not have the right of legislative initiative. Only the prince could initiate a formal initiative to pass a law.

==== The Prince ====
The prince was the dominant constitutional factor in legislative and executive authority. He had the so-called right of legislative sanction, i.e., the proclamation of laws, because no law could be put into effect until the prince declared it. The legislative power of the Assembly was particularly limited by the possibility that the prince, in the event of a threat to "state security", enacted regulations with the authority of the law ("extraordinarily issued laws"). In addition to having a dominant role in the legislative sphere, the prince had a key role in the executive sphere as well because he independently appointed and dismissed the government. The prince was the head of state, and as such, he had all the rights of state authority, which he exercised according to the provisions of the constitution. He was the supreme commander of all earthly power. His personality was inviolable and unaccountable. The prince appointed all state officials; who exercised their authority in his name and under his supreme supervision. The prince represented the country in all foreign affairs and concluded contracts with countries abroad, with the condition that: if such deals required any kind of payment from the state treasury, if they changed existing laws, or if they agreed to something that repressed human rights, it was necessary to obtain the consent of the National Assembly. The prince resided permanently in the country, and when, if necessary, he left the country for a while, he appointed one or more deputies for that time and assigned them authority within the limits of the constitution. The prince announced his departure from the country and the appointment of a deputy to the people with a proclamation. The Serbian prince had to be of the Christian Orthodox faith, and he became an adult when he turned eighteen years old. When he took office, he also swore an oath in front of the first assembly.

"I (name), by accepting this authority, swear by Almighty God and everything that is most sacred and dear to me in this world, before his holy cross and the gospel, that I will keep the earthly constitution intact, that I will rule according to it and the laws, and that in all my aspirations and actions I have only the good of the people before my eyes. I solemnly swear this oath of mine before God and the people by calling the Lord God as a witness, to whom I will answer at his terrible judgment, and I confirm the truth of this oath by kissing the holy gospel and the cross of the Lord Savior Jesus Christ. So, Lord God, help me. Amen! "

Upon accession to the throne, the prince was granted a sum of money annually from the state treasury for the duration of his rule as a civil list (salary), which was paid to him monthly. But the expenses endured for the maintenance of those state properties, which were given to the prince for free disposition, were paid from his civil list. The civil list, determined once, could not be increased without the consent of the Assembly and could not be decreased without the consent of the prince. After the prince's death, the civil list assigned to him was valid for the heir to the throne until the meeting of the first National Assembly.

==== National Assembly ====
The most important provisions of the Constitution of 1869 are devoted to the position and authority of the National Assembly. For the first time in the history of Serbian state law, the National Assembly became a legislative body, but with numerous restrictions on its jurisdiction. Legislative power is exercised by the National Assembly along with the Prince. This was expressed by the constitutional provision: “No law can be issued, repealed, amended, or interpreted without the consent of the National Assembly.” But the Assembly did not share equal legislative power with the prince. It did not have the right of legislative initiative but could only send a request to the prince that his government submit a legislative proposal for approval, and it could accept or reject the submitted proposal in its entirety, without the possibility of changing anything. Only the prince could launch a formal initiative to pass a law. In those cases, the Assembly resembled the "body of the mute" from Napoleon's Constitution of the consulate. The Assembly could not take into its sphere of work other subjects except those that are determined by the constitution or those that the prince would specifically hand over to it. In a state of emergency, the prince could decide on his own, through the proposal of the Council of Ministers, on what usually requires the cooperation of the Assembly, and that decision would have the authority of the law. However, upon the first convening of the Assembly after the state of emergency, the extraordinary law that was passed would have to be submitted for approval. Otherwise, without the approval of the Assembly, no tribute or general tax could be established, nor could the existing one be changed.

The budget law of the National Assembly was very limited, which is why it could not leave the Government without a budget and force it to deviate. If the Government did not adopt the objections of the National Assembly to the budget proposal, the old budget would remain in force for the following year. The Assembly was obliged to primarily take into consultation those items submitted to it by the Government, especially when it came to the budget; if it was requested, it was taken into consideration immediately. Likewise, the Government had to take into consideration those cases that were marked as urgent by the Assembly as soon as possible. Without the consent of the Assembly, the state could not indebt itself. If, due to some extraordinary and dire need, it would be necessary for the state to go into debt and the Assembly would not be in session, then it would have to be extraordinarily convened. But if the country found itself in such circumstances that it was not possible to convene the Assembly in an extraordinary manner, the prince could, through the proposal of the Council of Ministers and in agreement with the State Council, decide to make a loan, which must not exceed the sum of two hundred thousand ducats. The prince could, in the same way, decide to make an expenditure from the state treasury, for which there is no legislatively approved loan, to meet some extraordinary and dire state need, but the sum of such expenditures for one year was not allowed to exceed thirty thousand ducats. The first regular Assembly would be informed, in both of the above cases, what had been done, and the reasons why it was necessary to act in such a way would be explained.

The National Assembly was the people's representative office. It consisted of MPs (Member of Parliament), freely elected by the people, and MPs chosen by the prince. The Assembly was ordinary (regular) and grand. Elections of MPs were both direct and indirect through trustees. For every three MPs, the prince chose one MP from his circle of subjects who were distinguished by science or experience in national affairs (there were, therefore, ¾ of the people's MPs and ¼ of the prince's or government MPs). Every Serb who was of legal age and paid a civil tax on property, work, or income had the right to elect deputies or trustees. Anyone who had the right to vote could be elected as a trustee, but only those who were thirty years old, paid a state tax of at least six thalers per year on property, work, or income, and had other qualifications that were prescribed by the election law could be elected as an MP. Public officials and those who belonged to the ranks of civil servants, such as: pensioners, those who received some support from the state treasury, or those who invested in a widow's fund, as well as legal representatives, could not be elected as MPs. Soldiers were also not eligible for election, nor could they vote, no matter what rank they held. Those chosen by the prince could be taken from all ranks or classes of citizens. During the election of people's MPs or trustees, one could only vote in person and in one place only. All MPs had to live in Serbia, but they did not have to live in the county or town where they were elected. People's MPs were not only representatives of those who elected them but of the entire nation; therefore, they could not be given any mandatory control by the voters, but they represented and solved the people's needs according to their convictions and according to their conscience. All MPs took an oath when taking office.

===== Jurisdiction of the National Assembly =====
The Assembly could receive written complaints about cases that had already been resolved by the minister in question, but it could not receive complainants in person.

Every conclusion that the Assembly would submit to the prince would be followed by the prince's decision on the matter, if possible, during the duration of the same Assembly session.

Ministers had access to the sessions of the Assembly; they could participate in the trial of any case, be heard whenever they requested, and had the right to speak about the matter once more after the trial was over. The prince could appoint and send other officials to the Assembly as trustees, who would give the necessary explanations to the Assembly instead of the ministers or together with them, and these trustees then had the same rights as the ministers. But neither the ministers nor the trustees could vote in the Assembly.

===== Convening of the National Assembly =====
The Assembly was convened regularly every year, and when important or urgent matters required it, it could also be convened in an extraordinary manner. The prince convened, opened, and concluded the Assembly; he determined time of the year when it would be convened and the place where it would be convened. The prince could adjourn the convened Assembly for some time. When adjourning the Assembly he decided on the time period for which he would adjourn it, and that time could be six months at most. The prince could also dissolve the Assembly and order a second election of MPs. The second election of people's representatives had to be ordered within a period of six months at the latest, from the day the previous one was dissolved.

Without the prince's invitation, the deputies could not gather in the Assembly sessions, nor could they remain gathered, since the sessions were concluded, postponed, or the Assembly was dissolved.

Each Government proposal, and in general, each subject, had to be examined in one or more committees in the Assembly before being taken up for consultation and resolution. These Government committees had to be given the necessary explanations at their request. But the committees also had to listen to the government trustee about the objections that he would have to make and which he would explain to the committees in their session before giving their opinion to the Assembly, and the committees judged those objections and evaluated them at their discretion.

The National Assembly was unicameral. For the work of the Assembly, a high quorum of three-quarters of the present MPs was required, and decisions were made by the majority of the votes of those present. Members of the Assembly enjoyed immunity for the given vote but not complete unaccountability for the opinion expressed, as well as immunity from inviolability.

In the Assembly, one could only vote personally and publicly.

Assembly sessions were public, but they could also be secret, at the request of the president of the Assembly, a minister, or a government trustee, if one of them declared that secrecy was necessary for the announcements he had to make, or at the request of three MPs, who, after the listeners had left, would be joined by at least another quarter of the members present.

No one could enter the sessions of the Assembly with a weapon, nor the fence of its building.

==== Grand National Assembly ====
The institution of the Grand National Assembly was retained, which was four times larger than the regular one and consisted only of MPs elected by the people.

The Great National Assembly was convened when it was necessary:

1. to choose a prince, if the ruling prince passed away and there would be no heir to the throne according to the provisions of this constitution;
2. to elect regents of princely dignity when this need is shown in terms of the constitution;
3. to resolve the amendment to the constitution;
4. to resolve issues of greater importance regarding the reduction or exchange of parts of state areas; and
5. if the prince found it necessary to listen to the Great National Assembly on any issue of extraordinary importance for the country.

==== The Government ====
At the top of the civil service was the Council of Ministers, which stood directly below the prince in the hierarchy. The Ministerial Council (Government) was made up of ministers who were appointed for certain areas of administration, among whom the prince, at his discretion, appointed one as the president of the Council of Ministers. Ministers were officials of the highest rank whom the prince appointed and dismissed at will. They were not political figures, but they could be held criminally accountable in the National Assembly (for treason to the homeland or the price, violation of the constitution, accepting bribes, and harming the state out of self-interest), where a two-thirds majority was required to accuse the ministers. The proposal for that, which was submitted in writing, had to contain the charges and be signed by at least twenty MPs. The accused minister was tried by the State Court, whose composition was determined by law. The prince could not pardon the convicted minister without the consent of the National Assembly. State officials swore an oath to the prince that they would be faithful and obedient to him and that they would conscientiously adhere to the constitution. The army did not swear an oath to the constitution. An official who, due to old age or other physical or mental infirmity, could not perform the duties of his position had the right to a pension. In other cases, the rights and duties of state officials were determined by specific laws.

The Government (the Council of Ministers) was not politically accountable to the National Assembly, so there could be no question of a parliamentary system of government. It was a monarch's, not a parliamentary government.

The executive authority issues orders for the implementation of laws as well as orders originating from the prince's supervisory and administrative authority.

The Minister of Finance managed the state property, which consisted of all real estate and movable assets and all property rights that the state acquired as its own.

==== State Council ====
The State Council was retained as a government body, but with a completely changed function. It lost its legislative authority and became an advisory body for the Government in the preparation of legal and administrative projects. Its members were appointed by the prince, and there could be a minimum of eleven and a maximum of fifteen. Their status was equal to that of other state officials. A member of the State Council could not be a person who had not reached the age of thirty-five, had ten years of civil service, and had no real estate in Serbia. Numerous jurisdictions of the council were specified in the financial and administrative spheres, and it was transformed into an administrative court, the only one in the country.

The tasks of the State Council were:

1. to give the Government its opinion on the subjects that the Government would propose to it;
2. to construct and examine legal and administrative projects at the request of the Government;
3. to examine and resolve appeals against the decisions of ministers in disputed administrative matters;
4. to resolve conflicts between administrative authorities;
5. to approve honorary expenditures from the general loan designated by the budget for extraordinary needs, as well as the honorary use of the loan designated for construction, if the expenditure in a particular case would be greater than the amount that the minister can access himself in accordance with the law;
6. to approve exceptional acquisition of Serbian citizenship;
7. to approve the state taking on debt as well as extraordinary loans in cases provided for by the constitution;
8. to decide on taxes for the needs of districts, counties, and municipalities if the taxes exceed the amount that the administrative authority itself approves in accordance with the law, as well as on the districts, counties, and municipalities taking on debt;
9. to approve the sale and general alienation of district, county, and municipal real estate;
10. to decide on the expenditure of those sums, which could not be reimbursed;
11. to approve loans from the state treasury in cases of extraordinary circumstances or exceptional loans from the fund management;
12. to approve settlements, which would advance the interests of the state;
13. that it can request the necessary reports and explanations on state accounts from the main financial control authorities; and
14. to decide whether, according to the law, there is a justification for the occupation of private real estate in the interest of the general public.

==== Judicial branch ====
The judicial branch was multi-level and independent. The Constitution stipulated that "no branch of government, neither legislative nor executive, can exercise judicial functions, nor can courts exercise legislative or executive authority". Justice was administered in the name of the prince. When administering justice, the courts were independent and not subservient to any authority other than the law. Courts could not try executive officials for their official acts until the competent authority would allow them to do so. No one was allowed to be judged in front of another court except the one that was determined to have jurisdiction by law. The judge of the first-instance court could not be anyone who had not reached the age of twenty-five, and the judge of the higher courts could not be anyone who had not reached the age of thirty. There had to be at least three judges present when administering justice in the courts. However, the law could determine that cases of lesser importance, both criminal and civil, could be tried by a single judge. The trial in the courts was public, except where the law, due to public order and morality, dictated otherwise, but the judges consulted and voted in secret, and the verdict was pronounced loudly and publicly. In the verdict, the basis of the trial and the paragraphs of the law according to which the judgment was passed had to be presented. In all crimes and misdemeanors, the accused had the right to have a defense attorney before the court, and in cases defined by the law, the court had to appoint a defense attorney ex officio. In criminal cases, the prince had the right to pardon, and he could change the sentence to a less severe one, reduce it, or absolve it completely.

=== Human rights ===
Even in the area of human rights, the Regency Constitution did not meet the standards of its time. The main objection in this sense can be summed up in the possibility of limiting the exercise of guaranteed rights through law, and many rights were not even included in the catalog (for example, freedom of choice and agreement and the right to unionize). Political rights were formulated very narrowly, such as freedom of expression, while the constitution, without explicitly proclaiming the freedom of the press, provided for the adoption of a special law for the press ("of printing"). On the other hand, it was foreseen that the government could, "in the event of an imminent threat to public safety", suspend certain rights for some time, which further jeopardized the sphere of freedoms and rights of citizens.

The conditions under which Serbian citizenship was obtained and what rights it granted, as well as how it was lost, were determined by law. All Serbs were equal before the law. Serbs had equal rights to all state positions if they met the conditions as prescribed by law and if they had the ability to do so, while foreign subjects could only be admitted to certain positions under a contract, which was determined in more detail by law.

Personal rights were guaranteed by the Constitution and were not subject to any other restrictions except those that were prescribed by law. No one could be sentenced until they had been heard or called upon to defend themselves in a lawful manner. Also, no one could be imprisoned without trial, except in cases and prescriptions, which are determined by law.

Property rights were inviolable for the Serbs; without the owner's consent, no one was allowed to enter or investigate on his property, except in cases that were prescribed by law. Confiscation of property as a form of punishment was prohibited, with the exceptions of property: that was produced by the criminal act, was used as a tool during a criminal act, or was intended for the purpose of a criminal act. No one could be forced to cede his property to the state or other public needs, except where the law prescribed it and with compensation in accordance to the law.

The state religion in Serbia is Eastern Orthodox Christianity; all other recognized religions are also allowed, and they are under the protection of the law in the performance of their religious ceremonies, but no one can be relieved of their civil duties by referring to their religious beliefs. Any action that could be fatal to the Orthodox faith (proselytism) was forbidden.

Every Serb had the right to freedom of opinion, in accordance with the provisions of the law.

Every Serb had the right to deplore the illegal actions of the authorities. If the higher authority considered the appeal to be unfounded, it was obliged to inform the appellant of its decision and of the reasons why it did not accept his appeal. Everyone had the right to address a request to the competent authority in his own name, on behalf of another, and as a collective, only the competent authorities and legal entities (corporations) could do so, the latter in the cases for which they had authority.

Every Serb was a soldier and was obliged to serve in the military, except for those exempted by law. The People's Army, as one of the most necessary government institutions, could not be abolished or reduced. The military was not allowed to organize by itself; it gathered exclusively at the call of the chief. Soldiers were subject to military courts only for criminal offenses.

Every Serb and every legal entity was obliged to pay state tribute as well as other forms of taxes, and they were calculated on the same basis for everyone. Only the prince and the heir to the throne did not pay any tribute.

Every Serb was allowed to withdraw from Serbian citizenship after fulfilling his military obligations, as well as other duties he would have towards the state and other private entities.

=== State Institutions ===
Religions that are recognized in Serbia or that were recognized by a special law had the right to perform religious ceremonies in public. The prince was the protector of all religions recognized by the state. The correspondence of the spiritual authorities of the Orthodox Church with authorities or councils outside the country was conducted with the approval of the Minister of Church Affairs. The correspondence of priests of other religions with authorities and councils outside the country had to be submitted for review and approval to the Minister of Church Affairs. No act that came from spiritual authorities or church councils outside the country could be published by the spiritual authority in the country until it was approved by the Minister of Church Affairs.

All schools and other educational institutions were under the supervision of the state authorities.

Private institutes for charitable purposes could not be considered state property, nor could they be used for any other purpose except that which was determined when the institute was established. Only in the event that it was no longer possible to achieve the originally determined purpose of the institution, the property of the same could be used for other suitable purposes with the consent of those who would have the right of supervision and management of that institution.

=== Territorial organization ===
Regencies constitution did not even proclaim local self-government in principle but only stated that municipalities are "independent in their administration, in accordance with the provisions of the law." In the domain of territorial organization, the legislation that was valid before the adoption of the constitution was kept in use, and subsequent changes to those laws gradually removed the last remnants of local self-government in the entire state territory. The suspension of all elements of local self-government was carried out after Serbia was internationally recognized at the Congress of Berlin in 1878.

==== Municipalities and legal entities ====
No new municipality, and no legal entity in general, could be created without the approval of the state authorities. Likewise, any existing municipality could not, without the approval of the state authority, change its scope, either by absorbing other municipalities or by dividing itself into several municipalities. Municipalities were independent in their administration, in accordance with the provisions of the law.

Every citizen and every real estate property had to belong to a municipality in public relations, and every member of the municipality and every real estate property had to bear municipal burdens.

Municipalities and legal entities in general could, like all individuals, own property.

Municipal authorities were obliged to administer state affairs in their municipality, which were determined by the laws, in addition to municipal affairs.

=== Organic laws ===
In 1870, several of the so-called organic laws were adopted, which elaborated on the constitutional. These are the Election Law, the Law on Ministerial Accountability, the Law on the Order of Business in the National Assembly, and the Law on the Press. The organic laws were a step back from what was prescribed by the constitutional norm. Thus, the Election Law introduced public voting and election by proxy, except in district towns. The principle of ministerial accountability was wasted by the short statute of limitations of that accountability. Freedom of the press, declared by the Constitution, has been practically taken away by provisions of the law.

== Constitution in practice ==
One of the most accepted assessments of the quality of the Regency Constitution is the one expressed by Milovan Milovanović:

"It cannot be denied that this constitution has taken a significant step forward in the development of Serbian constitutionalism, but it is overestimated in certain circles of our public opinion.

because it did not cause any

extraordinary breakthrough in the constitutional life of Serbia.

Nevertheless, the Regency Constitution represented a good bridge between the primitive constitutionality introduced by the Turkish Constitution of 1838, adopted for a backward Turkish province that was fighting for its autonomy, and the Constitution of 1888, which was adopted in an independent country and established a parliamentary system and a rich catalog of human rights.

After it was adopted, the Regency Constitution was continuously applied for almost two full decades. During that time, many significant changes took place in the economic, cultural, and political life of Serbia, and three events are particularly important among them. First, at the Berlin Congress in 1878, Serbia received international recognition as an independent state. Second, at the beginning of the 1880s (1881), three political parties emerged—Liberall Party, Radical Party and Progressive Party – and became the main drivers of political organization. And thirdly, in the following year (1882), the monarchy was raised to the level of a kingdom.

The Regency Constitution was in use until the adoption of the Constitution of 1888, but also in the period from 1894 to 1901, when King Aleksander Obrenović suspended the Constitution of 1888 in a coup d'état (in May 1894) and reinstated the Constitution of 1869, which remained in force until the adoption of the Constitution from 1901.

== The Regencies inconsistent reforms ==
The Constitution proclaimed broad civil rights and freedoms (equality of citizens before the law, personal freedom, inviolability of property rights, freedom of speech, and freedom of the press), which were limited by laws passed in subsequent years. This example reflected the moderation and inconsistency of the Regencies reforms. The same was true for the judicial system, which was declared independent, but judges could be transferred and were thus, in reality, dependent on the executive branch of government.

== The end of the Constitutions first reign ==
After the adoption of the 1869 constitution, the Liberal Party, which was the only one able to form a serious opposition, became the ruling party. Newly created parties—progressives and radicals—were, however, dissatisfied with the existing situation and put the change of the constitution at the forefront of their political program.

In their proposal for the new constitution, the progressives advocated, among other things, that the Nation Assembly be given the power it has in countries with a parliamentary regime but with two houses, both based on a high census.

The Radical Party, whose origin was the socialist movement of Svetozar Marković. In the 1870s, it criticized the bureaucratic system from an economic point of view. But in the early 1880s, when they formally organized themselves as a political party, the radicals focused their attention on the relationship between the Government and the Assembly, seeking a new constitution that would give the Assembly supreme power.

On October 19, 1880, the Liberal Party of Jovan Ristić stepped down from power, and in its place came the Progressive Party, with whose support Prince Milan signed the so-called Secret Convention treaty with Austria. According to it, Austria guarantees Prince Milan and his descendants the throne of Serbia, as well as diplomatic support in the event of Serbia's southward expansion. In return, Prince Milan promises that Serbia will not conduct any agitation in Bosnia and Herzegovina (already under Austrian occupation at that point) and that, without a prior agreement with Austria-Hungary, it will not conclude political agreements with other countries.

The popularity that the radicals gained among the people was the reason for harsh attacks and persecution by the ruling Progressive Party and King Milan, who used all legal and illegal means against the radicals. In the atmosphere of intensified fights among the parties and the king's profound intolerance towards the radicals, in the fall of 1883, the Timok Rebellion broke out in eastern Serbia, which Milan used to deal with the Radical Party and its most prominent leaders.

Encouraged by the new situation and freed from the trepidations of the radicals, the king makes another risky international move. In November 1885, with the justification that he was protecting the balance of power in the Balkans, he declared war on Bulgaria, which shortly before that, in September of the same year, annexed Eastern Rumelia, an autonomous province of the Ottoman Empire, with a Christian general governor. Insufficiently armed, unprepared, and exhausted in the previous wars (1876–78), the Serbian army suffered defeat at Slivnica and then at Pirot. With the Treaty of Bucharest and the mediation of Austria, the territorial status quo was established. To re-establish the authority of his dynasty, which was undermined by the unpopular war with Bulgaria, Milan needed the support of the Radical Party. For these reasons, a coalition government of liberals and radicals was formed (in June 1887) in place of the previous progressive one, and from September, it was purely radical.

With the proclamation of October 14, 1888, King Milan ordered elections for the Great National Assembly in order to change the constitution. The king also made it known that the new constitution must be a joint work of all parties and that he will approve only what all parties agree on. The new constitution was confirmed and published on December 22, 1888.

== The second reign of the Constitution ==
The first of the three coups d'état that characterized the reign of Aleksandar Obrenović was carried out at the urging of his father, the former King Milan, on April 1, 1893. With the help of the army, Alexander prematurely declared himself of age, overthrew the Regency and changed the Government. This change initially suited the radicals, who returned to power, but soon, in January of the following year, with the return of Milan to Serbia, they were forced to retreat. The political game of Milan and Alexander continued to align with the other two parties, the Liberals and Progressives.

Harsh attacks by the opposition press and the fear of the radicals coming to power again after elections that would have had to be held according to the still valid Constitution of 1888 were the reasons why Alexander decided on a new coup d'état. With the proclamation of May 9, 1894, he suspended the Constitution of 1888 and reinstated the Regency Constitution of 1869. At the same time, Alexander promises that the new constitution will be adopted as soon as the situation in the country calms down. The Regency Constitution, however, was retained for another seven years.

Slobodan Jovanović writes about this period:

By combining various parties with each other, he (Alexander) thought to keep them in balance with each other and, again, to be the master of the situation... On the other hand, he had a natural gift for political intrigues and combinations, and he managed to almost completely disintegrate the Progressive and Liberal parties, which he mostly used for his neutral ministries, and from their elements he assembled his own "fourth party" which he could count on at every opportunity. The country was once again ruled by one party, only this time it was not a party of the people but a party of the court.

Pressure from Russia, to which the King is turning more and more after the cooling of relations with Austria, pressure from the Radicals, who after Milan's death develop a harsher attitude towards the King, as well as the desire to pacify as much dissatisfaction as possible due to his marriage to Draga Mašin, were all the reasons that forced Alexander to finally decide to change the constitution in 1901. This change was made by another unconstitutional act: the bestowal (gifting) of the constitution.

== Impact of the Constitution ==
The Regency Constitution was adopted without the prior consent of the sultan, which the guarantor powers tacitly accepted. The protests of the Porte were also absent, so this was the first independently (and successfully, unlike Sretenjski) adopted constitution of modern Serbia.

The greatest achievement of the Constitution of 1869 is the right of the National Assembly to enact laws together with the prince, but the appointment of ministers did not depend on it but on the prince. This was an important step towards strengthening the role of the parliament, which, for the first time, received part of the legislative power with this constitution. It convened once a year instead of once every three years as before. By raising the importance of the National Assembly and expanding the right to vote, important steps were taken towards the democratization of political conditions. Namely, the so-called representative system was adopted, but without parliamentary rule. Such a system also prevailed in the German states of that era: the assembly had a legislative function, but the government was appointed and replaced by the monarch.

The contribution of the Regency Constitution was reflected in the fact that its independent adoption strengthened the autonomous position of the country towards the Porte.

The Regency Constitution is the first Serbian constitution that is modernly conceived and legally regulated according to the European rules of the time. In addition, it is the first constitution that was written in the Ekavian dialect and Vuk's orthography. The language of the Constitution is precise and clear. Archaisms are rare in the text, and appropriate constitutional and legal terminology is used.

== Literature ==
- Dabić, Vojin; Antolović, Mihael (2015). History III - Textbook for the third grade of high school, socio-linguistic major and general type. Belgrade: Klett.
- Jevtić, Dragoš (1988). Jovičić, Miodrag (ed.). Constitutions of the Principality and Kingdom of Serbia 1835–1903. Belgrade: Scientific book.
- Jovanović, Slobodan (2005). The Rule of Milan Obrenović – Book 1. Belgrade: Education.
- Jovanović, Slobodan (1932). Political and legal discussions. Belgrade.
- Jovičić, Miodrag (1999). Lexicon of Serbian constitutionalism 1804–1918. Belgrade: Filip Višnjić.
- Krkljuš, Ljubomirka (2003). Legal history of the Serbian people. Novi Sad.
- Mirković, Zoran (2019). Serbian legal history. Belgrade: University of Belgrade – Faculty of Law.
- Mrđenović, Dušan (1988). Constitutions and governments of the Principality of Serbia, the Kingdom of Serbia, the Kingdom of SCS and the Kingdom of Yugoslavia (1835–1941). Belgrade: New Book.
- Pavlović, Marko (2008). Legal Europeanization of Serbia 1804–1914. Kragujevac.
- Petrov, Vladan; Stanković, Marko (2020). Constitutional Law. Belgrade: University of Belgrade – Faculty of Law.
- Popović-Obradović, Olga (2008). What kind or how big of a country?: Essays on the political and social history of Serbia in the XIX-XXI centuries. Helsinki Committee for Human Rights. ISBN 9788672081558.
- Prodanović, Јaša (1936). Constitutional development and constitutional struggles in Serbia. Belgrade.
