= 1871 Serbian parliamentary election =

Parliamentary elections were held in Serbia on 6 August 1871.

== Background ==
Following the promulgation of the 1869 constitution, elections were held in 1870 for an extraordinary Legislative Assembly to pass legislation that conformed to the new constitution.

It was dissolved after completing its work, which included a new electoral law setting the size of the National Assembly at 115 members, of which 97 were to be elected and 18 appointed by the monarch.

== Aftermath ==
The newly elected Assembly convened for the first time on 5 September. Živko Karabiberović became president of the National Assembly while Josif Pančić became vice-president.
