= Transparency Serbia =

Serbian anti-corruption organization

- Abbreviation: TS
- Formation: 2002
- Type: Non-profit organization
- Purpose: Fight against corruption
- Headquarters: Belgrade, Serbia
- Key people: Nemanja Nenadić
- Website: www.transparentnost.org.rs

Transparency Serbia (abbr. TS) is a non-profit organization based in Belgrade, Serbia. It was founded in 2002 and granted the status of "national chapter in formation" by the Transparency International (TI) movement. Over the next four years, Transparency Serbia concentrated its efforts on advocating for the adoption and improvement of anti-corruption legislation through the use of promotional campaigns, draft amendments, comparative legal analysis of legislation. Transparency Serbia further worked to raise public awareness of anti-corruption legislation and identify implementation gaps where legislation was not being enforced. The priorities of work in that period were advocating for the adoption of the Law on Free Access to Information of Public Importance (2004), the Law on Prevention of Conflict of Interest (2004), full implementation of the Law on Financing of Political Parties (2003) and the Law on Public Procurement (2002), as well as the adoption of the National Anti-corruption Strategy (2005) and the accompanying action plan (2006).

Since October 2005, the Transparency Serbia has been a fully fledged member of the Transparency International movement. This entails participation in the implementation of the TI Global Strategy, a commitment to common goals with other national chapters and the Secretariat (based in Berlin, Germany), as well as the exchange of experiences and best practices in efforts to curb corruption. Nonetheless, Transparency Serbia is registered as a civil society organization (association of citizens) in accordance with Serbian legislation, and as such it exercises full autonomy from the rest of the movement when determining which areas and corruption issues to tackle and how best to approach them.

In 2006, Transparency Serbia opened the Advocacy and Legal Advice Center (ALAC) in order to provide assistance to citizens and businesses in cases where they suspect that corruption is a barrier to the exercise of their rights.

Transparency Serbia was among the 100 Serbian companies, academic institutions and non-governmental organisations which signed up in 2007 to the UN Global Compact initiative aimed at promoting corporate responsibility.

More recently, in September 2015, on the occasion of the International Right to Know Day, Transparency Serbia won the national annual award for special contribution to the promotion of the right to information in Serbia.

== Organization ==
Transparency Serbia is a civil society organization. Its internal structure includes: • an Assembly, which adopts the most important documents of organization and elect other bodies, • a Managerial Board, which is responsible for strategy and then implementing of planned activities • a Supervisory Board, with a control and oversight mandate.

The senior positions in the organization are the President (currently without president), the Executive Director, the Program Director and the Financial Director. According to report on its website, Transparency Serbia is financed solely on the basis of donor contributions to projects, with funding coming mainly from international organizations and foundations, the European Union, and western governments.

== Activities ==
Currently, Transparency Serbia is focusing primarily on public procurement, the political party funding, conflicts of interest, and continuing its efforts to promote access to information.

Among the organization’s notable successes is that its work in the area of financing of political parties resulted in the recovery of EUR 750,000 to the Serbian budget. In 2006, Transparency Serbia found that the Ministry of Finance had erroneously calculated the amount of money political parties should receive from the state budget, and launched public campaign to correct the error. While the Ministry never admitted its error, it issued an instruction to reduce the payments to political parties the following year.

In 2011 and 2015, TS published the National Integrity System (NIS) Study for Serbia, a comprehensive assessment of how the most important sectors of society and the state can contribute to the prevention of corruption and their respective susceptibility to corruption. The NIS Serbia reports examined the Commissioner for Information of Public Importance and Personal Data Protection, the Ombudsman, the State Audit Institution, the Anti-corruption Agency, the judiciary, political parties, civil society, the executive, the state prosecutor’s office, the police, the legislature, the media, the business sector, the public sector, the Republic Electoral Commission and state-owned enterprises.

Overall, the 2015 study concluded that "corruption is widespread in Serbia, with most of the available data being about petty corruption and not enough data on the capture of institutions, political protection from prosecution for corruption, abuse of public funds for personal or group interests." According to the report, Serbia's National Integrity System overall is marked by a "notable imbalance between the independent and non-partisan institutions on one side and Public Sector, State Owned Enterprises and Electoral Management Body on the other side."

It also found that although "Serbia has adopted the most important anti-corruption legislation and established institutions for preventing and fighting corruption... practice has proved that some of the laws need to be amended while some of the institutions have been obstructed, ignored or not provided with sufficient resources."

Transparency Serbia regularly presents to public TI's Corruption Perceptions Index (CPI). In the 2019 CPI, Serbia scored 39 out of a possible 100 and it was ranked 91st among 180 countries and territories. Transparency Serbia also regularly presents to public the TI's Global Corruption Barometer, which measures the direct experience of citizens about corruption. At the presentation of 2016 GCB, TS estimated that there are at least 374,000 undiscovered cases of bribery in Serbia each year.

In 2015, 2017, 2019 and 2020, Transparency Serbia also presented the Local Government Transparency Index (LTI). LTI ranked all cities and municipalities in Serbia on the basis of transparency. According to these data, the most transparent municipality in Serbia in 2020 was Becej.
