= Defenders of the Constitution =

19th-century Serbian political movement

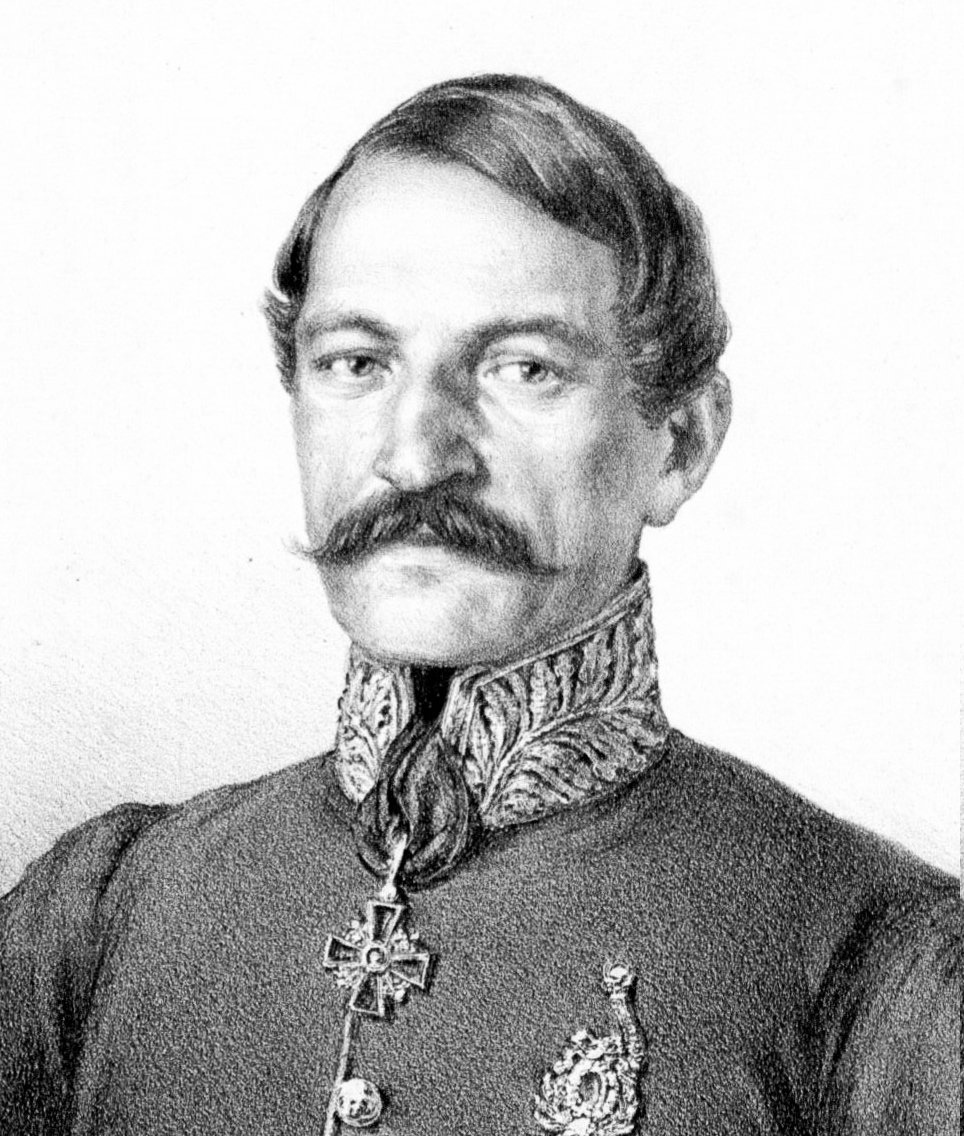
Ilija Garašanin was one of the leaders of the Defenders of the Constitution regime. He served as prime minister of Serbia from 1852-1853 and 1861-1867.

The Defenders of the Constitution (Serbian: Уставобранитељи, Ustavobranitelji) was a political regime that achieved power in Serbia in 1842 by overthrowing young Prince Mihailo Obrenović.

== History ==
Led by Toma Vučić Perišić and later Ilija Garašanin, Serbian Ministers, calling themselves the Defenders of the Constitution (1838 Constitution of Serbia). As a matter of government reform, the Defenders wanted better order in their administration. However, they also felt that the people themselves were not intelligent enough or in other words, not possessing the political consciousness or awareness to govern themselves; so it was their belief that the Defenders should teach or administer the people on how to govern themselves without their permission and against their own will.

Many of the politics and its bureaucratic foundations were derived from Garašanin and Vučić's childhood idol, the autocrat Francis II, the last Holy Roman Emperor from 1792 to 1806, and the first Emperor of Austria as Francis I from 1804 to 1835. Both believed strongly in creating an educational system and free elections. These politics were later borrowed and perfected by Jovan Ristić and his liberal government from 1876 to 1880.
