= 1838 Constitution of Serbia =

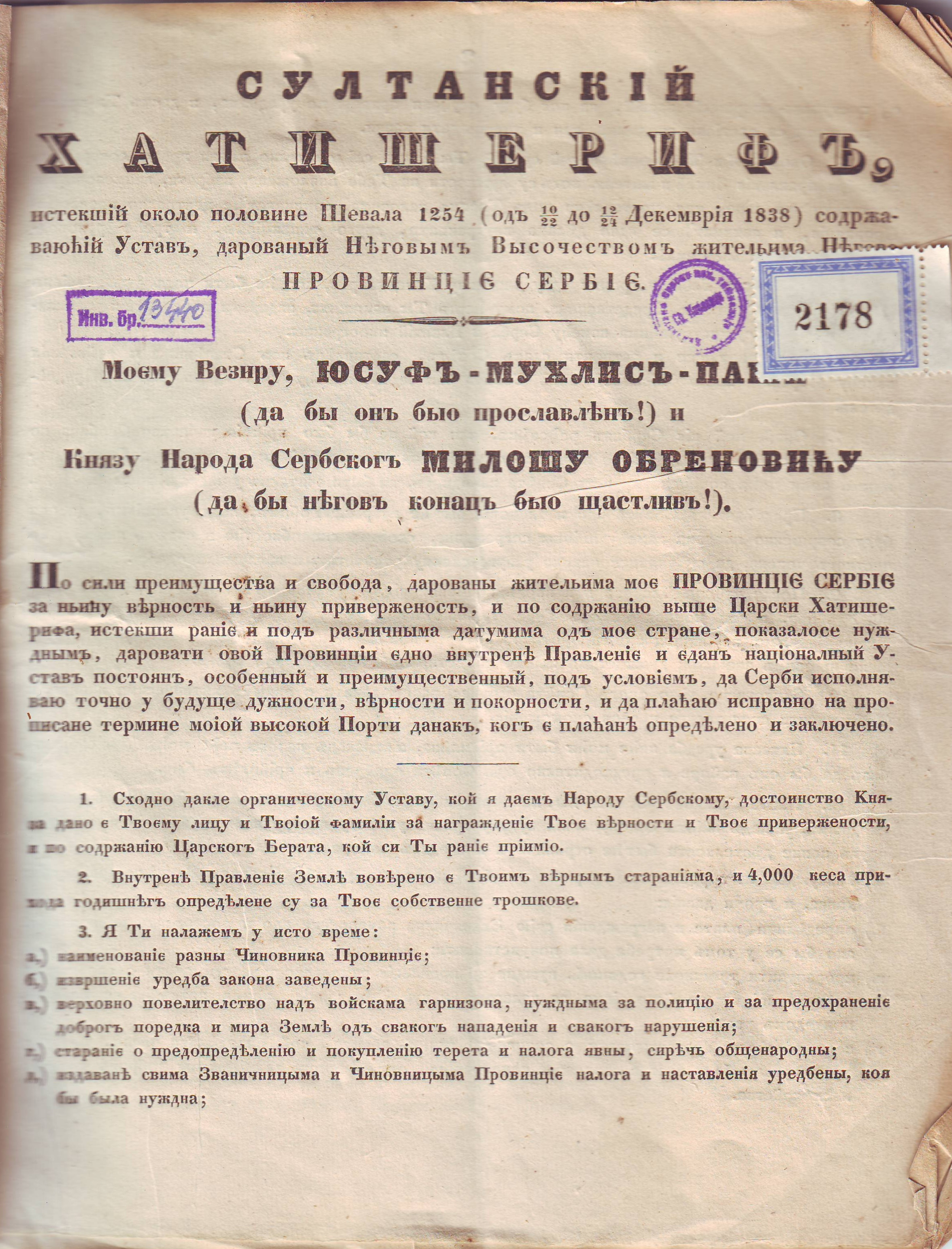
The first page of the Serbian Constitution of 1838

The Constitution of 1838, often called the Turkish constitution (Serbian: Турски устав, romanized: Turski ustav; because it was issued in the form of a sultan firman), was a constitution of the Principality of Serbia from 1838 until 1869. Through this, the Ottoman Empire wanted to show that Serbia was subservient to it. Although the new constitution was less liberal than the preceding Sretenje Constitution, Serbian prince Miloš Obrenović did not want to rule under it, so he abdicated in favor of his son Milan Obrenović.

== Background ==
The people of Serbia often rebelled against Miloš's autocratic and frequently brutal rule. Following one such rebellion, Mileta's rebellion, he agreed to adopt the very liberal Sretenje Constitution (Candlemas Constitution) in 1835, which abolished serfdom, granted freedom of speech and the press, and reduced the prince's power. The move was opposed by neighboring Austria, the ruling Ottoman Empire and Russia. It is believed that the three great empires saw the Sretenje Constitution as a danger to their own autocratic systems of government. Metternich's Austria particularly ridiculed the fact that Serbia had its own flag and ministry of foreign affairs. Miloš was glad to abolish the Sretenje Constitution at the demand of Russia and Turkey.

Prince Miloš Obrenović changed his way of ruling upon the abolition of the Sretenje Constitution. He stopped acting as supreme judge and abolished monopoly of the salt trade. The Constitution of 1838 was carried out by the Russian Empire, Ottoman Empire and Austrian Empire. The Russian envoy handed "basis" for the constitutional organization of Serbia. According to him, the constitution should contain only administrative provisions, because the hatt-i sharif of 1830 granted political rights for the Principality of Serbia. Russia requested to maintain the Council, through which it could put pressure on the prince.

== Aftermath ==
Although the new constitution was less liberal then its predecessor, prince Miloš Obrenović did not want to rule under it, so he abdicated on June 13, 1839, in favor of his son Milan Obrenović. Milan died less than a month later and was succeeded by his brother Mihailo Obrenović. In 1842 his first reign came to a halt when he was overthrown by a rebellion led by Toma Vučić-Perišić, which enabled the Karađorđević dynasty to accede to the Serbian throne. The most influential men in Serbia after that were Vučić-Perišić and Ilija Garašanin of the Defenders of the Constitution.

== Literature ==
- Mrđenović, Dušan, ed. (1988). "Устави и владе Кнежевине Србије". Устави и владе Кнежевине Србије, Краљевине Србије, Краљевине СХС и Краљевине Југославије (1835-1941). Belgrade: Nova knj.
- Radoš Ljušić (1986). Кнежевина Србија (1830-1839). Srpska akademija nauka i umetnosti.
- Ustavi Kneževine i Kraljevine Srbije 1835—1903, Beograd, Naučna knjiga, 1988.
- Ljubomirka Krkljuš: Pravna istorija srpskog naroda, Novi Sad 2002.
