= Cabinet of Karađorđe Petrović =

Government of Serbia (1811–1813)

Cabinet of Đorđe Petrović
- Cabinet of Revolutionary Serbia
- 1811–1813
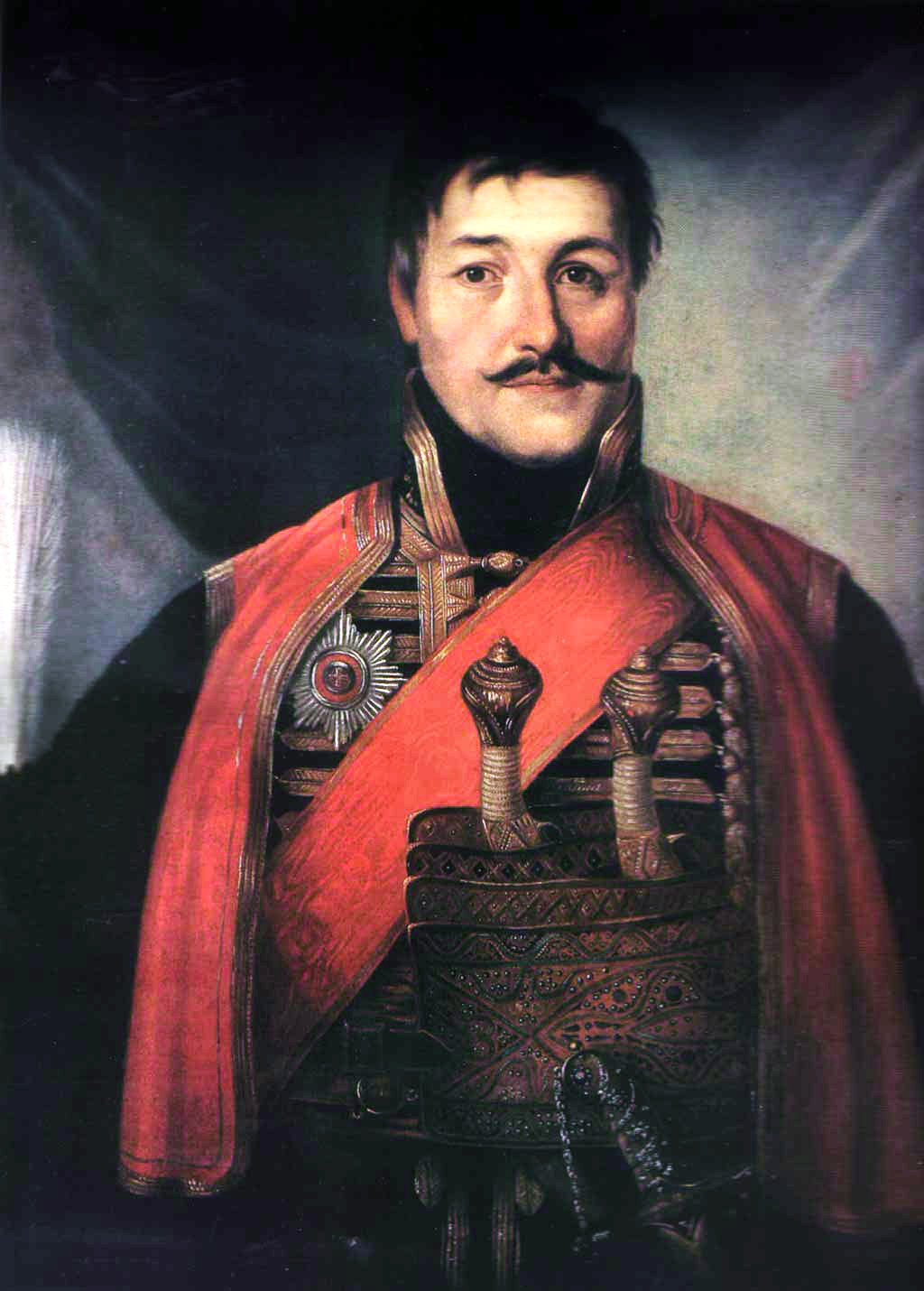
- Date formed: 11 January 1811
- Date dissolved: 3 October 1813

People and organisations
- Head of state: Đorđe Petrović
- Head of government: Đorđe Petrović
- Total no. of members: 9

History
- Predecessor: J. Nenadović
- Successor: Ministerial Deliberation (1834)

The cabinet of Đorđe Petrović, more commonly known as Karađorđe, was formed on 11 January 1811. It held office until 3 October 1813, when Karađorđe fled to the Austrian Empire after the defeat of Revolutionary Serbia in the First Serbian Uprising. The next government was the Ministerial Deliberation, which was formed in 1834.

== Timeline ==
On 11 January 1811, Karađorđe entered the Assembly of Uprising Champions and removed Jakov Nenadović and his cabinet from power by proclaiming a constitutional act that would ensure him absolute military and political power. Soon after, the government recognized Karađorđe as Serbia's hereditary leader and pledged allegiance to his "lawful heirs", while Karađorđe also adopted the title of a Supreme Leader (Serbian Cyrillic: Вожд, romanized: Vožd). Additionally, Karađorđe governed a highly centralized government.

Karađorđe conducted radical restructuring of local governments, especially regarding the military. The areas that were once controlled by vojvodas were now fragmented into smaller military-administrative units which limited the power of vojvodas. His power was though kept in check by his cabinet and rivals.

== Composition ==
The government was now composed of ministries (Serbian Cyrillic: попечитељства, romanized: popečiteljstva; lit. 'guardianships'). Karađorđe appointed his supporters and opponents to the cabinet. Petar Dobrnjac and Milenko Stojković, who were initially supposed to serve in the cabinet, declined due to fearing that by accepting the positions, Karađorđe's power would be legitimized. In response, Karađorđe exiled them to Wallachia.

Office	Name	Took office	Left office	Ref
President of the People's Governing Council	Đorđe Petrović	11 January 1811	3 October 1813	
Minister of Defence	Mladen Milovanović	11 January 1811	3 October 1813	
Minister of Foreign Affairs	Miljko Radonjić	11 January 1811	25 December 1812	
Minister of Education	Dositej Obradović	11 January 1811	7 April 1811 (died)	
Minister of Education	Ivan Jugović	7 April 1811	1812	
Minister of Internal Affairs	Jakov Nenadović	11 January 1811	3 October 1813	
Minister of Treasury	Sima Marković	11 January 1811	3 October 1813	
Grand Vilayet Judge	Ilija Marković	11 January 1811	3 October 1813	
Secretaries	Mihajlo Grujović	Unknown		
Secretaries	Stevan Filipović	Unknown		

== Aftermath ==
Karađorđe's reforms to the military led to the collapse of Revolutionary Serbia in 1813. He fled to the Austrian Empire on 3 October, while Belgrade, where the government's headquarters were located, fell to the Ottoman Empire later that month.
