= Cabinet of Mladen Milovanović =

Government of Serbia (1807–1810)

- Cabinet of Revolutionary Serbia
- 1807–1810
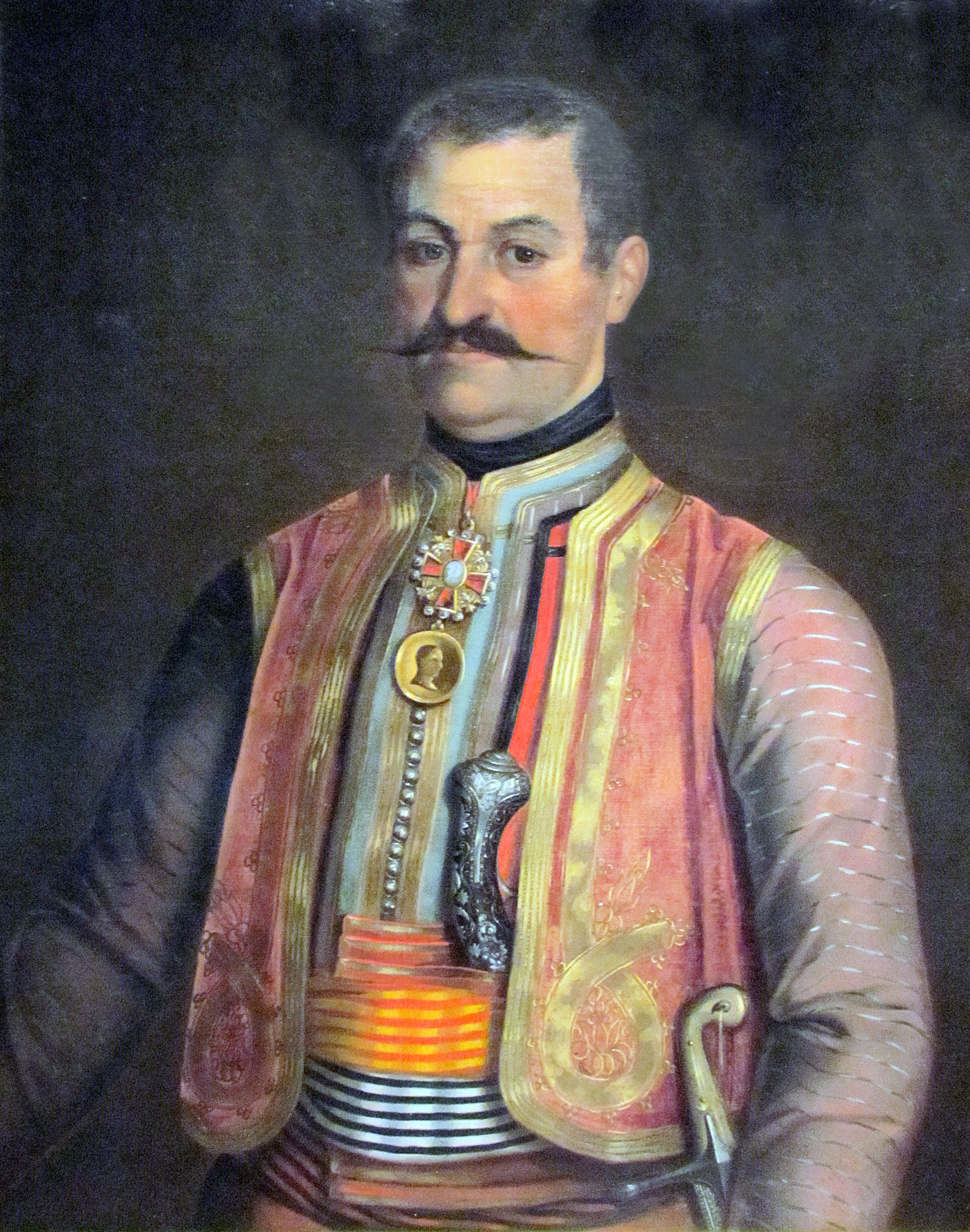
- Date formed: April 1807
- Date dissolved: 31 December 1810

People and organisations
- Head of state: Đorđe Petrović
- Head of government: Mladen Milovanović
- Total no. of members: 14

History
- Predecessor: M. Nenadović
- Successor: J. Nenadović

The cabinet of Mladen Milovanović was formed in April 1807. It held office until 31 December 1810, when it was dismissed and replaced by the cabinet of Jakov Nenadović.

== Timeline ==
The government of Serbia, known then as the Serbian Governing Council (Serbian Cyrillic: Правитељствујушчи совјет сербски, romanized: Praviteljstvujušči sovjet serbski; lit. 'Serbian Soviet'), was formed in 1805. Dukes Jakov Nenadović, Matija Nenadović, Milan Obrenović, and Sima Marković, with the assistance of Adam Jerzy Czartoryski, the minister of foreign affairs of the Russian Empire, proposed the creation of a government in order to limit Karađorđe's powers. Karađorđe accepted the formation of the government on conditions that the government would help him with military and foreign policy. With the Assembly of Uprising Champions, it represented the authority in Revolutionary Serbia. The government organized and supervised the administration, economy, judiciary, foreign policy, order, and the supply of arms for Serb forces.

Matija Nenadović headed his cabinet until April 1807, when the office was taken over by Mladen Milovanović. The government's headquarters were in Belgrade.

== Composition ==
The cabinet was composed of 13 representatives from 13 nahiyahs from among whom the president was elected every month. In 1809, Stojan Pavlović, the Rudnik nahiyah representative, was replaced by Milan Obrenović. The following composition is according to an Austrian report from 1808:

Office	Name
President of the Governing Council	Mladen Milovanović
Kragujevac nahiyah representative	Mladen Milovanović
Požega nahiyah representative	Petar Knežević
Rudnik nahiyah representative	Stojan Pavlović (until 1809)
Rudnik nahiyah representative	Milan Obrenović (after 1809)
Požarevac nahiyah representative	Jovan Protić
Belgrade nahiyah representative	Pavle Popović
Jagodina nahiyah representative	Velisav Stanojlović
Smederevo nahiyah representative	Janko Đurđević
Ćuprija nahiyah representative	Milija Zdravković
Valjevo nahiyah representative	Milisav Ilijić
Užice nahiyah representative	Vasilije Radojičić
Soko nahiyah representative	Milutin Vasić
Zvornik nahiyah representative	Jevta Savić Čotrić
Šabac nahiyah representative	Ilija Marković

Pavle Popović, Velisav Perić, Vasilije Jović, Janko Đurđević, Dositej Obradović, and Ilija Marković served as representatives in November 1810, with Milovanović as president. Stevan Filipović and Mihailo Grujović were secretaries.

== Aftermath ==
On the New Year's Day in 1810, voivode Jakov Nenadović brought in around six hundred armed men into the Assembly of Uprising Champions in order to force Karađorđe to dismiss Milovanović as the president of the Governing Council. Nenadović succeeded and became the president of the Governing Council. This is disputed by historian Radoš Ljušić, who says that Nenadović became president in 1809.
