= Cabinet of Matija Nenadović =

Government of Serbia (1805–1807)

- Cabinet of Revolutionary Serbia
- 1805–1807
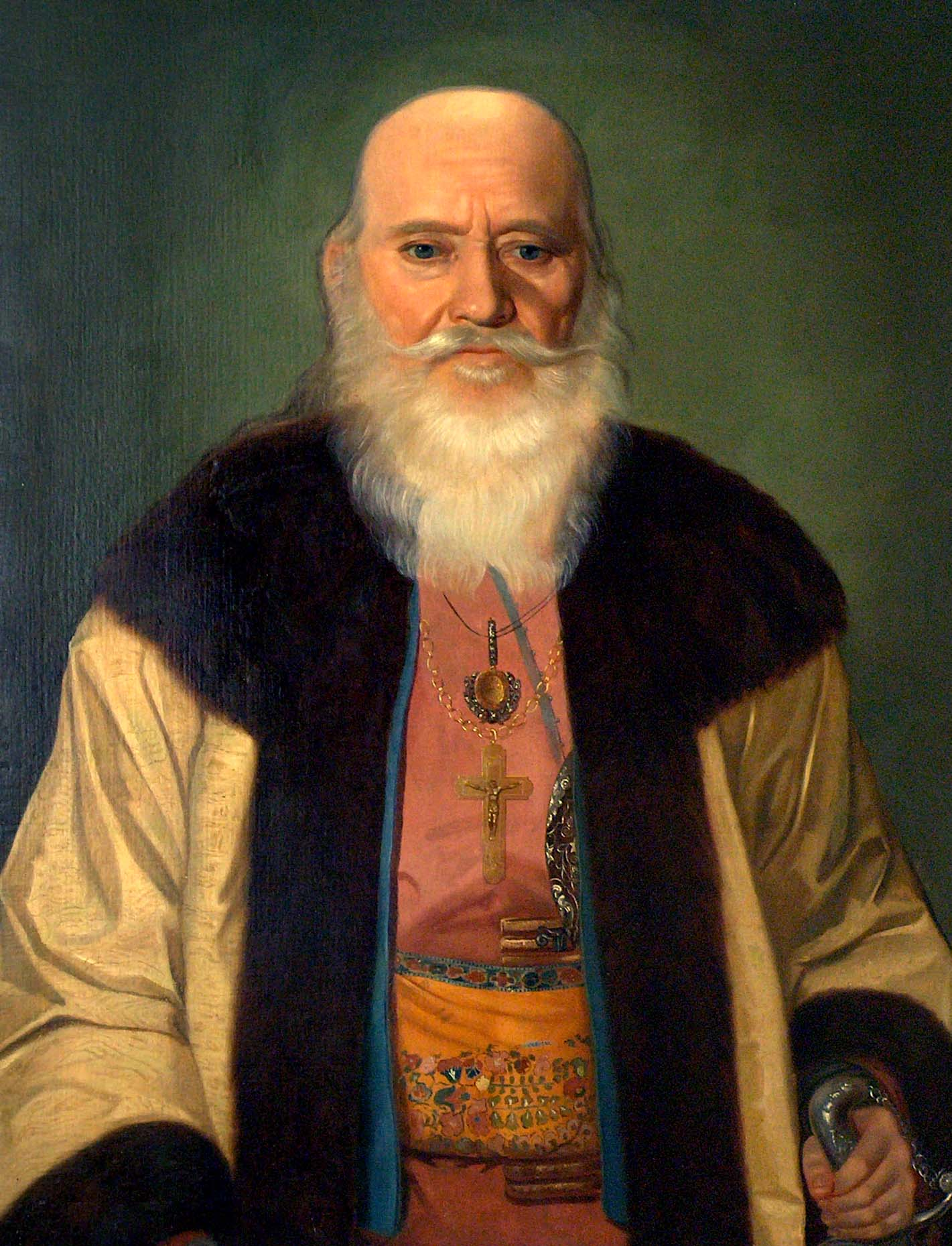
- Date formed: 27 August 1805
- Date dissolved: April 1807

People and organisations
- Head of state: Đorđe Petrović
- Head of government: Matija Nenadović
- Total no. of members: 12

History
- Successor: Milovanović

The cabinet of Matija Nenadović was formed on 27 August 1805. It was the first government of Serbia. It held office until April 1807, when it was replaced by the cabinet of Mladen Milovanović.

== Timeline ==
Following the "Slaughter of the Knezes" in 1804, a group of leading Serbs decided to begin an uprising against dahijas; they soon after elected Karađorđe as their leader, and the Serb rebels managed to liberate areas in the Belgrade Pashalik and sought autonomy from the Porte, but this broke down with the Battle of Ivankovac in 1805 and general uprising against the Ottoman Empire. The commanders Jakov Nenadović, Matija Nenadović, Milan Obrenović, and Sima Marković, with the assistance of Russian Foreign Minister Czartoryski proposed the creation of a government in order to limit Karađorđe's powers. Karađorđe accepted the formation of the government on conditions that the government would help him with military and foreign policy.

This led to the formation of the first government of Serbia, known as the Serbian Governing Council. With the Assembly of Rebel Leaders, it represented the authority in Revolutionary Serbia. The government organized and supervised the administration, economy, judiciary, foreign policy, order, and the supply of arms for Serb forces. The founding assembly of the Governing Council was held on 14 August 1805 in Marković's house near Barajevo. Together with his cabinet, Matija Nenadović was appointed president of the Governing Council on 27 August 1805.

The government's headquarters were initially at Voljavča and then at Bogovađa, although it was later moved to Smederevo.

== Composition ==
The cabinet was composed of 12 representatives from 12 nahiyahs from among whom the president was elected every month. Considering that the representatives of the Governing Council changed frequently, it is hard to determine all of its representatives and when they served as representatives.

- According to R. Ljušić (2005), the first composition of the cabinet included Mladen Milovanović, Avram Lukić, Jovan Protić, Pavle Popović, Velisav Stanojlović, Janko Đurđević, Đurica Stočić, Milisav Ilijić, Ilija Marković, Vasilije Radojičić, Milutin Vasić, and Jevta Savić Čotrić.
- According to K. Nenadović (1883), the first nahija representatives were six, chosen at the Borak Assembly, and included Vesa Velimirović for Valjevo, Koja Ivanović for Šabac, Stojan Pavlović for Rudnik, Pavle Popović for Belgrade, Jovan Protić for Požarevac, Janko Đurđević for Smederevo. Several more were appointed afterwards, including Đurica Stočić for Ćuprija, Vukoman for Jagodina, Avram Lukić for Čačak, Mladen Milovanović for Kragujevac, Vasilije Jov. Petroman for Užice. After the first six representatives were chosen, Karađorđe ordered for the Governing Council to headquarter at Voljavča. Those nahijas that weren't appointed initially were ordered to gather assemblies and choose representatives and send them to Voljavča. Đurica Stočić was replaced by Milija Zdravković and Vukoman was replaced by Velisav Stanojlović.
- According to M. Petrović (1897), following the Borak Assembly and decision of establishment of the "Synod", representatives of seven nahijas were sent, including Matija Nenadović from Valjevo, Jovan Protić from Požarevac, Avram Lukić from Požega, Mladen Milovanović from Kragujevac, Janko Đurđević from Smederevo, Vukoman from Jagodina, Milija Zdravković from Ćuprija. The Synod was headquartered at Voljavča for a short period, being moved to Bogovađa and then with the takeover of Smederevo in mid-November 1805, to Smederevo.
- According to Batalaka (1898), following Đuša Vulićević's death, Karađorđe moved the Governing Council from Bogovađa to Smederevo. The representatives (deputat) were Matija Nenadović (the president) for Valjevo, Jovan Protić for Požarevac, Mladen Milovanović for Kragujevac, Janko Đurđević for Smederevo, Miloje Zdravković for Ćuprija, Avram Lukić for Požega, Čačak and Rudnik, Vukoman for Jagodina, Pavle Popović for Belgrade. Some of these were replaced and new were appointed with the expansion of rebel territory.
- According to Vuk Karadžić (1787–1864), the "Synod" first gathered at Voljavča, with the first members being President Matija Nenadović of Valjevo, Jovan Protić of Požarevac, Boža Grujović the scribe, then joined by Vukoman of Jagodina, Avram Lukić of Požega, Mladen Milovanović of Kragujevac, Janko Đurđević of Smederevo, Milija Zdravković of Ćuprija.

Đurica Stočić was replaced with Milija Zdravković by Karađorđe. In late 1805, the cabinet only included Jakov Nenadović, Janko Katić, Milenko Stojković, Luka Lazarević, and Milan Obrenović, with Nenadović as president, as concluded by R. Ljušić. Vuk Karadžić listed the following representatives:

Office	Name
President of the Governing Council	Matija Nenadović
Kragujevac nahiyah representative	Mladen Milovanović
Požega and Rudnik nahiyah representative	Avram Lukić
Požarevac nahiyah representative	Jovan Protić
Belgrade and Grocka nahiyah representative	Pavle Popović
Jagodina nahiyah representative	Velisav Stanojlović
Smederevo nahiyah representative	Janko Đurđević
Ćuprija nahiyah representative	Milija Zdravković
Valjevo nahiyah representative	Milisav Ilijić
Užice nahiyah representative	Vasilije Radojičić
Soko nahiyah representative	Milutin Vasić
Zvornik nahiyah representative	Jevta Savić Čotrić

== Aftermath ==
Nenadović stepped down as president of the Governing Council in April 1807, and was succeeded by Mladen Milovanović, who headed the government until 1810.

== Sources ==
- Batalaka, Lazar Arsenijević (1898). Историја српског устанка. Vol. I. Izd. Batalakinoga fonda.
- Čubrilović, Vasa (1982). Istorija političke misli u Srbiji XIX veka (in Serbian). Narodna knjiga. p. 65.
- Janković, Dragoslav (1955). Istorija države i prava Srbije u XIX veku (in Serbian). Nolit. p. 18.
- Jelavich, Barbara (1983). History of the Balkans. Cambridge: Cambridge University Press. ISBN 978-0-521-25249-2. OCLC 9043005.
- Karadžić, Vuk Stefanović (1860). Praviteljstvujušči sovjet serbski za vreme kara-Đorđijeva ili Otimanje ondašnjih velikaša oko vlasti (PDF). Vienna.
- Karadžić, Vuk Stefanović (1898). Скупљени историски и етнографски списи Вука Стеф. Караџића. Штампарија краљевине Србије.
- Ljušić, Radoš (2005). Vlade Srbije: 1805-2005 (in Serbian) (1 ed.). Belgrade: Zavod za udžbenike i nastavna sredstva. p. 65. ISBN 978-86-17-13111-9. OCLC 67978385.
- Milićević, Milan Đ. (1888). Поменик знаменитих људи у српског народа новијега доба. Издање Чупићеве задужбине – via Archive.org.
- Nenadović, Konstantin N. (1903) [1883]. Живот и дела великог Ђорђа Петровића Кара-Ђорђа. Vol. I (2 ed.). Belgrade: Штампа Савића и Комп. – via Archive.org.
- Nenadović, Konstantin N. (1884). Живот и дела великог Ђорђа Петровића Кара-Ђорђа. Vol. II (1 ed.). Vienna: У Штампарији Јована Н. Вернаја – via Google Books.
- Petrović, Mita (1897). Финансије и установе обновљене Србије до 1842: Од доласка Срба на Балканско полуострво до 1842. Državna Štamparija Kraljevine Srbije.
