= Karađorđe's Code =

Karađorđe's Code, as one of the two recognized general laws of uprising Serbia, was a turning point in the establishment of the legal system in the newly formed state. With its Austrian-oriented provisions, it tended to lose the influence left on society by the Ottoman Empire. In the very matter of Karađorđe's Code, the branches of customary and criminal law intertwine, and we also come across provisions that the author created under the influence of the Eastern Orthodox Church.

== Background ==
With the expansion of the territory of uprising Serbia and the strengthening of the personality of the leaders of the First Serbian uprising, there was a need to create a modern law that would regulate social relations in the liberated areas. Striving for state autonomy and liberation from Ottoman influence, state bodies passed numerous individual acts, but also acts of a more general type, which modern lawyers would call decrees. However, only two general acts are mentioned, which are called the code or the law – the Law of Archpriest Mateja and Karađorđe's Code.

It is believed that the formal constitutional act of 1811 gave the state authorities of insurgent Serbia sufficient power to establish a new legal system in the following years and pass a code suitable for the liberated state. Namely, the constitutional act of 1811 established a nationwide order in insurgent Serbia. Similar to the previous act of 1808, the constitutional act of 1811 is a certain type of contract between the supreme leader, the knez and the Governing Council, the common point of both constitutional acts is the central government which is in the hands of the leader. According to these decrees, the leader is independent in the exercise of power and does not receive instructions and orders from anywhere outside. In this legal system, the Council is only a board that executes the leaders' provisions.

== Origin ==
Karađorđe's Code belongs to the second law of insurgent Serbia, but it is more significant in its scope and content than the law of Archpriest Mateja Nenadović. However, the time of creation and the author of Karađorđe's Code are not known. There are assumptions that speak about the creation of Karađorđe's Code, and it is considered that it was created after the adoption of the constitutional act from January 1811. Namely, this constitutional act crowned the struggle between the insurgent leadership and the elders' opposition. Having central power, the insurgents were only after that able to create provisions that would form the basis of the newly created legal system after this act. According to Zoran Mirković, the creator of this legal act can be the secretary, but also the later trustee of the Governing Council – Ivan Jugović. After graduating from the Faculty of Law in Pest, where he studied Austrian law, Jovan Savić, later introduced as Ivan Jugović, was introduced to the laws and rules of the Austrian Empire and the Military Border, whose influence we recognize in Karađorđe's Code. After the death of Dositej Obradović in 1811, Ivan Jugović was appointed guardian of education (Minister of Education in the insurgent Serbian government) and had an insight into the legal organization of insurgent Serbia and the adoption of its code.

According to the analysis of Zoran Mirković, out of thirty preserved articles of Karađorđe's Code, more than half actually originate from the regulations of the Austrian military frontier. The author of Karađorđe's Code had several reasons why he used the mentioned regulations as a model. The first reason was that Serbia itself was a certain type of military frontier, representing the scene of many years of fighting against the Ottomans. Another reason was the insurgents themselves, even Karađorđe, who served in the Austrian freikorps during Kočina Krajina. The third, but no less important, reason is that the writer of Karađorđe's Code was almost certainly a Serb from the Habsburg monarchy who studied the regulations there well. The influence of the Austrian military frontier was in the regulations on desertion after a lost battle, on the prohibition of shooting without approval, on rebellion, on the retention of ammunition and other military equipment, on murder, on wounds and other bodily injuries, on sleeping on guard, on protection of parts and the dignity of dignitaries, about espionage and betrayal, about harassing "his brother", about banning corvée or private purposes, regarding punishments for robbers and insurgents (hajduk).

== Provisions ==
The text of Karađorđe's Code contained a total of forty-one articles, of which Articles 9, 10 and 14 to 41 have been preserved to this day. Articles 1 to 8 and 11 to 13 have not been preserved. Paying attention to the preserved articles, we can conclude that insurgent Serbia provides us with a unique example of the correlation of customary, state-church and criminal law from different times.

Karađorđe's Code covered customary law institutions, such as collective responsibility, and introduced measures against robbers and thieves, where theft is punishable depending on the type of animals stolen, we also encounter property penalties for certain Crimes, such as manslaughter and attempted murder who were treated equally with a half-year prison sentence and compensation for damages.

The author of Karađorđe's Code, under the influence of church legislation, also prescribes provisions of a religious character. Crimes that violate marriage and morality entailed severe sanctions. Article 30 of Karađorđe's Code tells us about an illegitimate mother who has the obligation to feed a child, however, if she is ashamed, she has the opportunity to subvert the child to another, but we must not kill him – the murder of a child was punishable by death. Karađorđe's Code prescribes severe sanctions for a priest who marries a kidnapped girl but also for the kidnapper himself. The provision that gives us a closer insight into the power of the church in the drafting of Karađorđe's Code, but also the beliefs that lived among the people, is marked with the number 31. The mentioned provision on the investigation of witches shows us the belief in magic that has been maintained among the people, but also the influence of the church, which denies any kind of magical beliefs.

The new government of insurgent Serbia protected its state system and the established legal system from disputes or non-recognition of any kind, and in a certain part of Karađorđe's Code we can find sanctions for insulting the government and the Soviet, those sanctions are equal to those given to traitors and spies. In the defense of the new order, Article 23 is also emphasized, which punishes any insult addressed to a priest, elder or merchant, with this article we see that Karađorđe's Code protected not only the holders of state power but also the members of the established ruling class. When sanctioning criminal acts against the state, Karađorđe's code specifically approached rebels (hajducija). Namely, during the period of the creation of Karađorđe's Code, people dissatisfied with the newly formed order turned into rebels (hajduci), and among them could often be found Karađorđe's dissidents and competitors who posed a danger to the young state. Articles prescribing sanctions for the crime of rebellion and aiding a rebels, they tell us about the surrender of a living robber to the court, where his arms and legs will be beaten, after which he will be crucified on a wheel. In Karađorđe's Code, in addition to criminal acts against the state, there are also provisions from light to serious military criminal acts. Espionage in favor of the opponent as well as escape from the fight was punishable by the death penalty by wheeling with previous bodily mutilation, beating of arms and legs, while robbery by soldiers was punished with beatings. To the criminal acts against the state committed by dissidents of the government, we can add the criminal acts committed within the state apparatus. When regulating the newly liberated state, Karađorđe's Code pays great attention to the subordination of the elders to the law, and we can find several articles of the mentioned code written for that purpose. For the crime of protection and bribery, but also the abuse of seniority by appropriating military confiscation, severe punishments followed to limit the arbitrariness of the elders.

There are no direct data in written historical sources on the application of the provisions of Karađorđe's Code, instead there are numerous examples that testify to the introduction of certain institutions prescribed by Karađorđe's Code into the insurgent system. Examples of these institutions are the death penalty with cruel execution as well as corporal punishment such as whipping. However, in addition to the penalties prescribed by Karađorđe's Code, the penalties from the Ottoman period still prevailed.

== Legacy ==
The law was first published in an article in Serbian newspaper by Miloš Popović on July 1, 1844. It was later published under the title “Rules of War and the People” in 1852. At the beginning of the twentieth century, the Code was reprinted twice, in 1905 and 1907. It was last published by A. Solovyov in the Archives of Legal and social sciences from December 25, 1932. according to a manuscript found in the National Library in Belgrade.
