= Cabinet of Jakov Nenadović =

Government of Serbia (1810–1811)

- Cabinet of Revolutionary Serbia
- 1810–1811
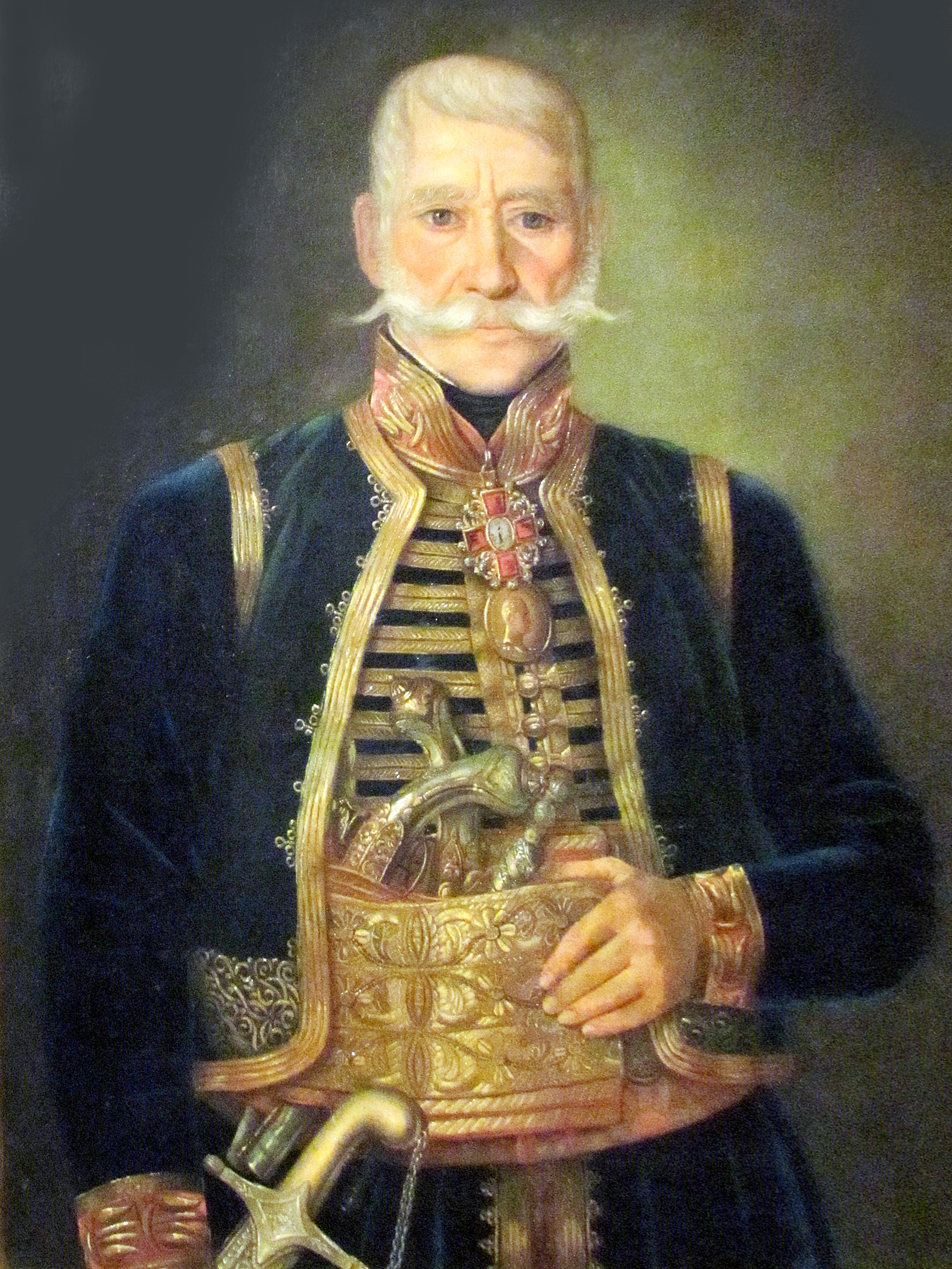
- Date formed: 31 December 1810
- Date dissolved: 11 January 1811

People and organisations
- Head of state: Đorđe Petrović
- Head of government: Jakov Nenadović
- Total no. of members: 9

History
- Predecessor: Milovanović
- Successor: Petrović

The cabinet of Jakov Nenadović was formed on 31 December 1810 after the dismissal of Mladen Milovanović. It held office until 11 January 1811, when it was dismissed and replaced by the cabinet of Đorđe Petrović, who was also the head of state of Revolutionary Serbia at the time.

== Timeline ==
On the New Year's Day in 1810, voivode Jakov Nenadović brought in around six hundred armed men into the Assembly of Uprising Champions in order to force Karađorđe to dismiss Milovanović as the president of the Governing Council. Nenadović succeeded and successfully became the president of the Governing Council. With the Assembly of Uprising Champions, it represented the authority in Revolutionary Serbia. The government organized and supervised the administration, economy, judiciary, foreign policy, order, and the supply of arms for Serb forces. The government's headquarters were in Belgrade.

== Composition ==
Considering that historian Radoš Ljušić has disputed the claim that Nenadović became president in December 1810, and has instead said that he became president in 1809. According to him, there were 6 members and two secretaries in November 1810.

Office	Name
President of the Governing Council	Jakov Nenadović
Members	Pavle Popović
Members	Velisav Perić
Members	Vasilije Radojičić
Members	Janko Đurđević
Members	Dositej Obradović
Members	Ilija Marković
Secretaries	Stevan Filipović
Secretaries	Mihailo Grujović

== Aftermath ==
On 11 January 1811, Đorđe Petrović, more commonly known as Karađorđe, entered the Assembly of Uprising Champions and removed Nenadović from power by proclaiming a constitutional act that would ensure him absolute military and political power.
