= Russo-Serbian Alliance (1807) =

1807 alliance between Russia and Serbia

- Signed: 10 July 1807
- Location: Revolutionary Serbia, Russian Empire
- Signatories: Karađorđe
- Parties: Russian Empire; Revolutionary Serbia

The Russo-Serbian Alliance (Serbian: Руско-српски савез / Rusko-srpski savez, Russian: Русско-сербский союз) was signed on 10 July 1807 between Revolutionary Serbia under Đorđe Petrović (Karađorđe) and the Russian Empire, during the First Serbian Uprising. After the Ottoman Empire had allied itself with Napoleon's France in late 1806, and was subsequently at war with Russia and Britain, it sought to meet the demands of the Serbian rebels. At the same time, the Russians offered the Serbs aid and cooperation. The Serbs chose alliance with the Russians over autonomy under the Ottomans (as set by the "Ičko's Peace"). Karađorđe was to receive arms, and military and medical missions, which proved to be a turning point in the Serbian Revolution.

The Russians sought Serbian military protection to the Russian right flank, while the Serbs sought to establish a nation-state encompassing also Bosnia and Herzegovina, and the pashaliks of Vidin, Niš, Leskovac and Novi Pazar.

== Background ==
The Habsburg emperor had abandoned the Serbs and made peace with the sultan in the last war, in which Serbs were merited and had heavy casualties. Russia became the hope in restoring a Serbian state, having earlier inspired the Balkans in the Russo-Turkish War (1768–1774). When Austria refused to openly support them, the Serbs turned to Russia, which was an Ottoman ally since 1799 and could only offer diplomatic support to autonomy for Serbia. The Great Powers feared Russian influence and viewed unfavourably on a Serbian state.

The Serbs and Russians are fellow Orthodox Christians, a fact used by the Serbian Orthodox clergy and later rebel leadership to rally Russia to aid. The Serbian bishop of Bačka (in Habsburg territory) Jovan Jovanović sent a petition to the Russian metropolitan asking for aid "from their Orthodox brethren".

== History ==
The peasant rebellion against the Dahije expanded into a national uprising in 1805. The Serbs issued modest demands, limited autonomy, to the Ottoman sultan, but at the same time asked to be placed under the protection of Austria and Russia. In correspondence and delegations to the Austrian and Russian courts, Karađorđe used the term "Serbian nation" and called them potential "saviours of our nation". After a string of victories in 1806, the rebels petitioned the Russian emperor to send troops, maintaining that "all Serbs from Serbia, Bosnia, Herzegovina, Montenegro, Dalmatia and Albania would joyfully unite". In late 1806 and early 1807 the Serbian rebels demanded independence and declared Serbia an independent state. After victories at Mišar and Deligrad in 1806, and liberation of Belgrade in 1807, the Serbs hoped to secure statehood with Russia's aid.

Russia planned for conflict with the Ottoman Empire and informed the Serbs of future alliance, with the Ottomans declaring war in December 1806. Russian instructors and a special envoy, Konstantin Rodofinikin, were sent to Serbia. Serbia sought Russian aid in forming a Serbian state not only in the Belgrade Pashalik but also in neighbouring Serb- and Christian-inhabited territories, while Russia sought Serbian military support on its flank, redirecting Serbian operations to its east. While successful joint operations commenced in 1807, Russia and France signed the Peace of Tilsit (July 1807) which saw the end of Russo-Turkish operations.

In March 1807 the Serbian leadership summoned an assembly at Belgrade and decided to enter alliance with Russia.

Serbia wished to be included in the Russo-Turkish truce signed at Slobozia in 1807 but were excluded, to the dismay of Serbian leaders who now became afraid of a change in Russian political course.

== See also ==
- Timeline of the Serbian Revolution
- Russo-Turkish War (1806–1812)
- Anglo-Turkish War (1807–1809)

== Sources ==
- Bataković, Dušan T. (2006). "A Balkan-Style French Revolution? The 1804 Serbian Uprising in European Perspective". Balcanica (36).
- Đorđević, Dimitrije (1965). Révolutions nationales des peuples balkaniques 1804-1914 [The National Revolutions of the Balkan Peoples 1804-1914]. Belgrade: Institut d’histoire.
- Popović, Radomir J. (2013). Идеал независности и нужност аутономије: настанак српске нововековне државе државе 1788/1804-1833. године (PDF). Два века модерне српске дипломатије. Балканолошки институт САНУ. pp. 69–88. ISBN 978-86-7179-079-6.
- Rajić, Suzana (2010). "Serbia – the Revival of the Nation-state, 1804–1829: From Turkish Provinces to Autonomous Principality". Empires and Peninsulas: Southeastern Europe between Karlowitz and the Peace of Adrianople, 1699–1829. Berlin: LIT Verlag. pp. 143–148. ISBN 9783643106117. Archived from the original on 2023-01-13.
