= Ičko's Peace =

Proposed peace treaty between the Ottoman Empire and Revolutionary Serbia

- Signed: 13 July 1806 (Serbs); January 1807 (Ottomans)
- Location: Revolutionary Serbia; Constantinople, Ottoman Empire
- Signatories: Karađorđe; Mladen Milovanović
- Parties: Ottoman Empire; Revolutionary Serbia
- Depositary: Petar Ičko
- Languages: Serbian, Turkish

Ičko's Peace (Serbian: Ичков мир / Ičkov mir) is the name given to a peace treaty negotiated in between July and October 1806 by Petar Ičko, an Ottoman dragoman (translator-diplomat) and representative of the Serbian revolutionaries during the First Serbian Uprising. Ičko had been sent to Constantinople twice in the latter half of 1806 to negotiate peace. The Ottoman Empire seemed ready to grant Revolutionary Serbia autonomy following rebel victories in 1805 and 1806, also pressured by the Russian Empire, which had taken Moldavia and Wallachia; they agreed to a sort of autonomy and clearer stipulation of taxes in January 1807, by which time the rebels had already taken Belgrade. Ičko had already in 1804 envisioned Serbian autonomy based on "the Greek islands". The clauses included:

- Serbia remains an Ottoman subject, with a fixed annual tribute set at 722,500 groschen and modest taxes to the sipahi.
- Serbs given amnesty, while Janissaries and other violent "Turks" were to be expelled.
- Ottoman regular army garrisons would remain only in the four main cities of Belgrade, Smederevo, Šabac and Užice, the Muslims expelled from the rest of territory.
- Serbs given right to open schools and build churches.
- Appointment of a hereditary baš-knez as Serbian leader, who in turn appoints a knez in each okrug (district).

The Serbian rebel leadership did not accept this and continued the uprising. The rebels sought Russian aid to their independence, while the Ottomans had declared war on Russia in December 1806. A Russo-Serbian alliance treaty was signed on 10 June 1807.

== See also ==
- Serbian Revolution
  - Timeline of the Serbian Revolution

== Sources ==
- Novaković, Stojan (1903). "Ичков мир. Покушај непосредног измирења Србије и Турске, 1806-1897". Глас СКА. 18.
- Popović, Radomir J. (2013). Идеал независности и нужност аутономије: настанак српске нововековне државе државе 1788/1804-1833. године (PDF). Два века модерне српске дипломатије. Балканолошки институт САНУ. pp. 69–88. ISBN 978-86-7179-079-6.
- Šarkić, Srđan (2015). "Ruski projekti državnog uređenja ustaničke Srbije". Zbornik radova Pravnog fakulteta u Novom Sadu. 49 (2).
- Скорб, Максим Геннадьевич (2020). "РОССИЙСКАЯ И АВСТРИЙСКАЯ МОДЕЛИ АВТОНОМИЗАЦИИ БЕЛГРАДСКОГО ПАШАЛЫКА НА НАЧАЛЬНОМ ЭТАПЕ ПЕРВОГО СЕРБСКОГО ВОССТАНИЯ (1804—1806)". Вестник БарГУ Серия «Исторические науки и археология. Экономические науки. Юридические науки»: 77-.
- Vukićević, Mil. (1905). "Неколико прилога за расветљење ичкова мира". Дело. 34. Belgrade: Штампарија "Доситеј Обрадовић": 265–270.
