= Janko Đurđević =

Janko Đurđević (Serbian Cyrillic: Јанко Ђурђевић; c. 1770–1828) was a representative of the Smederevo nahija in the cabinets of Matija Nenadović, Mladen Milovanović, and Jakov Nenadović. He was a member of the Serbian Supreme Court from 1811.

== Biography ==
Đurđević was born around 1770 in the village of Konjska Reka near Bajina Bašta, at the time part of the Dunavska knežina (Serb self-governing village group) of the nahiya (Ottoman district) of Smederevo. With the establishment of the Governing Council of Revolutionary Serbia, Đurđević became a representative of the Smederevo nahija in the cabinets of Matija Nenadović, Mladen Milovanović, and Jakov Nenadović. He was a legal advisor during the uprising, and member of the Serbian Supreme Court from 1811. In 1813, he fled to Austria and then emigrated to Imperial Russia where he died in 1828.

His son Paun Janković (1808–1865) was acting Prime Minister of Serbia in 1840.

== See also ==
- List of Serbian Revolutionaries

== Sources ==
- Arsenijević-Batalaka, Lazar (1898). Историја српског устанка. Изд. Баталакинога фонда. p. 472.
- Milićević, M. Đ (1888). Pomenik znamenitih ljudi u srpskog naroda novijega doba (in Serbian). Slovo ljubve.
- Milan Đ. Milićević,Kneževina Srbija (Belgrade, 1878)
- Konstantin N. Nenadović, Život i dela velikog Đorđa Petrovića Kara Đorđa Vrhovnog Vožda... (Vienna, 1884)
