= Čotrić =

Čotrić or Cotric (Serbian: Чотрић) is a surname. Notable people with the surname include:

- Aleksandar Čotrić (born 1966), Serbian politician
- Jevta Savić Čotrić (c. 1767–1821), Serbian politician and diplomat
- Nick Cotric (born 1998), Australian rugby league player
