= Jevta Čotrić =

Serbian politician and diplomat

Jevta Čotrić (Serbian Cyrillic: Јевта Чотрић; c. 1767–1821) was a Serbian politician and diplomat during the First Serbian Uprising and Second Serbian Uprising who served as a representative of the Zvornik nahiyah in the Cabinet of Matija Nenadović in 1805. He was the older cousin of Vuk Karadžić and with him, Vuk Karadžić "began to study books".

== Biography ==
Jevta Savić, known as Čotrić (Чотрић), was an educated and respected man even before the uprising. With Anta Bogićević, and with Karađorđe's approval, he concluded a well-known contract with Mehmed-pasha Vidajić.

In 1807 he was elected a member of the Governing Council in Belgrade. Ivan Jugović opened the nucleus of what eventually became the Velika škola in the fledgling premises of his big house. In 1812, he was appointed elder of Kladovo and Brza Palanka. He unsuccessfully negotiated peace with the Turks in 1813. In 1814, he "appeared before the Austrian emperor in Vienna with Archbishop Mateja Nenadović and prayed that any relief would be given to the people in Serbia."

He returned to Serbia in 1815 and settled in Šabac, where he died in 1821. He was buried in the family tomb at the Šabac cemetery. Vuk Karadžić wrote in his memoirs that Jevta was a far more accomplished writer than some of his contemporaries in the Governing Council.

== Annotations ==
1. His name was Jevta Savić (Јевта Савић), but he was known as Čotrić (Чотрић) and Čotra (Чотра), and is often referred to as Jevta Savić-Čotrić (Јевта Савић-Чотрић) in historiography. His given name may also be spelt Jefta (Јефта Савић).

== Sources ==
- Ilić, Mikica (15 February 2017). "Đorđe Obradović – Ćurčija, Karađorđev ustanik iz Bosuta". M novine (791). Sremska Mitrovica: 35–41 – via Academia.edu.
- Milićević, Milan Đ. (1888). Поменик знаменитих људи у српског народа новијега доба. Издање Чупићеве задужбине – via Archive.org.
- Nenadović, Konstantin N. (1884). Живот и дела великог Ђорђа Петровића Кара-Ђорђа. Vol. II (1 ed.). Vienna: У Штампарији Јована Н. Вернаја. pp. 653–656 – via Google Books.
- Obradović, Stojan (1873). Живот и радња заслужних Срба из окружија шабачког и подринског у књажеству Србији у устанцима противу насиља турског од 1804. и 1815. године: у два одељка. Stefanović.
- Teinović, Bratislav (2020). "Преглед српско-турског ратовања на Дрини (1804-1815)". Vojnoistorijski glasnik. 2: 9–35.
