= Petar Ičko =

Ottoman merchant and Serbian diplomat

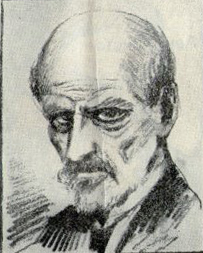
- Born: Petros Itskos/Itskoglou c. 1755; Katranitsa (Pyrgoi), Ottoman Empire (now Greece)
- Died: 5 May 1808; Belgrade, Ottoman Empire (now Serbia)
- Occupations: Diplomat and merchant
- Known for: Representative of Serbian rebels during First Serbian Uprising; Ičko's Peace
- Children: Naum

Petar Ičko (Serbian Cyrillic: Петар Ичко, c. 1755–1808) was a merchant from Ottoman Macedonia active in Belgrade and dragoman (translator) for Ottoman delegations in Vienna and Berlin who notably joined the Serbian rebels during the First Serbian Uprising as an advisor and diplomat. His friend Hadji Mustafa Pasha, the Vizier of Belgrade, was murdered in December 1801 by the renegade Janissaries known as Dahije. He fled to Habsburg Zemun and worked with the Serbian rebel leadership, becoming their advisor and diplomat sent to Constantinople to negotiate with the Porte. He is remembered for instituting Ičko's Peace, though of short duration.

== Biography ==
Petros Itskos or Itskoglou (Greek: Ιτσκος, Ιτσκογλου, rendered as Serbian: Ičkoglija/Ичкоглија, Ičkoglić/Ичкоглић) was a Greek or Aromanian from Katranitsa (Pyrgoi) in Ottoman Macedonia. He was an influential merchant in Belgrade, the capital of the Sanjak of Smederevo (known as the "Belgrade Pashalik"). He was hired as the translator for Ottoman delegations in Vienna and Berlin. For a short period, he was the serdar in the service of Alexander Mourouzis. Following the Austro-Turkish War (1788–1791), he was an intermediary in Austrian–Ottoman trade. He worked with and befriended the Belgrade bina-emin (architectural supervisor) Hadji Mustafa Pasha.

Mustafa Pasha became the Vizier of Belgrade in 1794. Mustafa Pasha worked on dealing with the problematic Janissaries and Pazvantoglu, but as the Porte made concessions to the latter, Mustafa allowed the return of the Janissaries to the Belgrade Pashalik. When Mustafa Pasha was held hostage at the Belgrade Fortress, his friends, including Ičko, planned to organize Serb hajduk bands to support his rule against the renegade Janissaries (known as the Dahije) that wrested the control of the Pashalik. Mustafa was murdered on 15 December 1801 and all of the Pashalik came under the rule of the Dahije. After Mustafa's murder, the sipahi (noble cavalry) and Serbs both worked on throwing off Dahije tyranny. The Dahije tried once, at the beginning of their rule, to poison influential knez (Serb mayor) Aleksa Nenadović, but he was saved by Ičko who had an antidote. In a letter of Nenadović to Austrian officer Mitesser, it is claimed that the Dahije were infighting, and that Ičko, among two others, could corroborate this. Many Christian merchants left Belgrade for Habsburg Semlin (Zemun), including Ičko.

After the outbreak of Serb rebellion against the Dahije in February 1804, he began supporting and working with the Serbian rebels led by Karađorđe. He rendered them some valuable advice thanks to his diplomatic and trade skills. Ičko had already in 1804 envisioned Serbian autonomy based on "the Greek islands". At the Smederevo Assembly (May 1805), "Petar Ičkoglić, serdar and consul of Belgrade" was given mandate to negotiate with the Porte. The rebel leaders sent him as their representative to Constantinople where he managed to obtain for them a favourable peace treaty, known as "Ičko's Peace". He returned and lived in Belgrade as an honorary citizen, but died there soon after, on 5 May 1808, probably poisoned.

His son Naum Ičko established the "Question-mark" bistro in 1823. His house is preserved today as "Ičko's House".

== See also ==
- List of people of the First Serbian Uprising

== Sources ==
- Batalaka, Lazar Arsenijević (1898). Историја српског устанка, део први [History of the Serbian Uprising: Part One]. Vol. I. Izd. Batalakinoga fonda – via Google Books.
- Batalaka, Lazar Arsenijević (1899). Историја српског устанка, део други [History of the Serbian Uprising: Part Two]. Vol. II. Izd. Batalakinoga fonda – via Google Books.
- Gavrilović, Mihailo (May 1903), Popović, Bogdan (ed.), "Ичков мир", Српски књижевни гласник, IX (9): 104-
- Milićević, Milan Đ. (1888). Поменик знаменитих људи у српског народа новијега доба. Издање Чупићеве задужбине. pp. 186–189 – via Archive.org.
- Nenadović, Konstantin N. (1884). Живот и дела великог Ђорђа Петровића Кара-Ђорђа. Vol. II (1 ed.). Vienna: У Штампарији Јована Н. Вернаја – via Google Books.
- Novaković, Stojan (1903). "Ичков мир. Покушај непосредног измирења Србије и Турске, 1806-1897". Глас СКА. 18.
- Novaković, Stojan (1904). Устанак на дахије 1804 [Uprising against the Dahije]. Штампано у Државној штампарији – via Archive.org.
- Pantelić, Dušan (1949). Београдски пашалук пред Први српски устанак: 1794-1804. Belgrade: Научна књига.
- Popović, Radomir J. (2013). Идеал независности и нужност аутономије: настанак српске нововековне државе државе 1788/1804-1833. године (PDF). Два века модерне српске дипломатије. Балканолошки институт САНУ. pp. 69–88. ISBN 978-86-7179-079-6.
- Vukićević, Mil. (1905). "Неколико прилога за расветљење ичкова мира". Дело. 34. Belgrade: Штампарија "Доситеј Обрадовић": 265–270.
