= Ministerial Deliberation =

- 1st Cabinet of Principality of Serbia
- 1834-1835
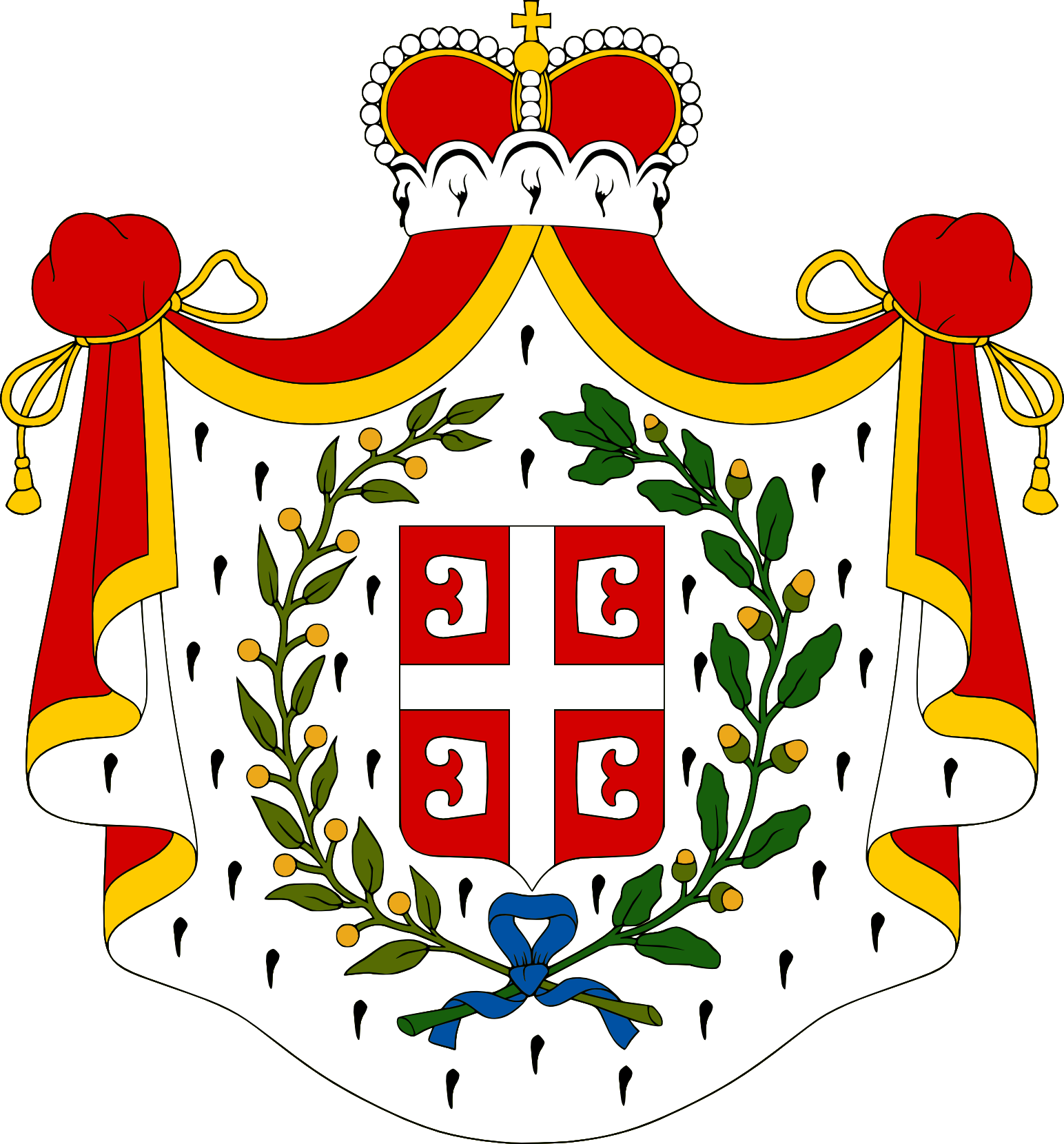
- Coat of arms of Principality of Serbia
- Date formed: 1834
- Date dissolved: 1835

People and organisations
- Head of state: Miloš Obrenović I
- Head of government: None

History
- Predecessor: Petrović (1813)
- Successor: Marković

Ever since the 1830 Hatt-i sharif came into effect, and Serbia got its autonomy from the Ottoman Empire, the need for an executive body of power became obvious. The Hatt-i sharif stipulated that the Prince and the council should share the power, and especially the executive power, while the legislative power should remain in the hands of the Prince. So, in February 1834, it was decided that the Ministerial Deliberation is to be formed, and that it should have true executive power. The main idea for this probably came from Dimitrije Davidović, the Prince's Secretary.

The Cabinet was formed in such a way that there was no Prime Minister, or any other figure that might serve as the Head of this Ministerial Deliberation. Also, the duties of the Ministers and the Ministries were not clearly established, so they tended to overlap quite frequently. However, this was not the main reason why the format of the government was changed; Prince Miloš changed it out of fear of the people that rose up against his authority during the Mileta's Rebellion. The people wanted a government that has to share both the executive and the legislative power with the Prince, and in order to make that happen, Prince Miloš adopted the Sretenje Constitution (written by Dimitrije Davidović), and posted Koca Marković to the newly formed position of Prime Minister.

== Cabinet members ==
Position	Name	Image
Minister of Justice and Education; Later just Minister of Justice	Lazar Teodorović	
Minister of Internal Affairs	Đorđe Protić	
Minister of Finance	Koča Marković	
Minister of Army Affairs	Toma Vučić-Perišić	
Minister of Foreign Affairs; Later Minister of Foreign Affairs and Education	Dimitrije Davidović	

== See also ==
- Principality of Serbia
- Prince Miloš Obrenović I
- Dimitrije Davidović
