= Jovan Savić =

Serbian professor (1772–1813)

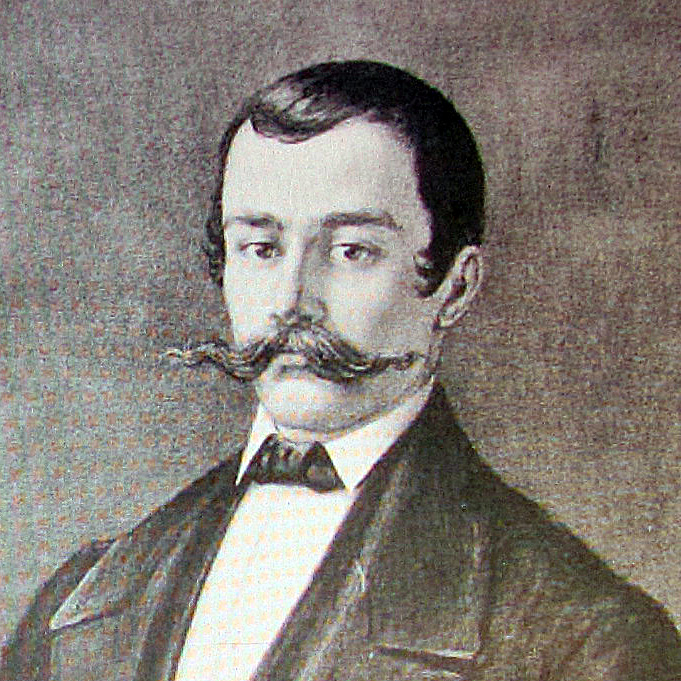

Jovan Savić or Ivan Jugović (Serbian Cyrillic: Јован Савић or Иван Југовић; Sombor, 1772 – Veliki Bečkerek, 1813) was the first professor at the initial founding of Belgrade's Velika škola and secretary of the ruling Supreme Council (Soviet) in Revolutionary Serbia. He was an Austrian sympathizer.

== Biography ==
He completed all the requirements of elementary school education (then under the director Avram Mrazović) and grammar school in his hometown and at the gymnasium in Szeged, after which he studied law in Budapest. On 1 February 1798, Dean Emerick Kelemen of the Faculty of Law sent a letter of recommendation to Metropolitan Stefan Stratimirović and Jovan Savić was accepted as a professor of the preparatory class of the Second Latin Grammar School in Sremski Karlovci, and in the following school year 1799/1800 Savić was appointed professor of the grammar class.

He left his professorship on 1 March 1802 and moved to Vršac as Bishop Josif Jovanović Šakabenta's secretary, at which time he clashed with Metropolitan Stratimirović, leaving his position in Vršac in 1805. He moved to Serbia, to Smederevo, where, under the pseudonym Ivan Jugović, he soon became a clerk in the ruling Supreme Council (Praviteljstvujušći sovjet), headed by the president Matija Nenadović. In 1807, after the death of Božidar Grujović, the first secretary of Serbia's ruling Council, Jugović took Grujović's place. In early September of the same year, he was sent on a diplomatic mission to the headquarters of the Russian army in Bucharest. Based on the intrigues of the Russian envoy to Serbia Konstantin Rodofinikin, Jugović was dismissed from the Supreme Council at the end of 1807.

After leaving his job, Ivan Jugović decided to set up a school in Belgrade that would teach more science and teach future national leaders and governors of Serbia. The Grandes écoles was solemnly opened on 31 August (12 September according to the Julian calendar) in 1808 by the dedication of Jugović and a theological seminary in 1810. Dositej Obradović was appointed its first rector and Jugović was its only professor during the first semester. Karadjordje and other leaders sent their sons to the new school they called Velika škola (Grandes écoles after the French model). Its first students included Lazar Arsenijević Batalaka and Vuk Karadžić.

At the end of 1808, Jugović was politically rehabilitated and headed a diplomatic mission (included Pavle Popović and Janićije Djurić) that spent months in Jassy, at the headquarters of the Russian army, in talks with Field Marshal Prince Alexander Prozorovsky about Serbia's future status. On his return from this mission, Jugović was appointed President of the Belgrade Magistrate, and in March 1810 served on a diplomatic mission as Karadjordje's envoy to the Austrian Emperor Francis I in Vienna. In early 1811 he was re-appointed as the first secretary of the Ruling Soviet. When Dositej Obradović died in March 1811, Jugović was appointed to the post of the Enlightened One (Minister of Education in the uprising Serbian government). In the conflict between the Russophile and Austrophilic currents (to which Jugović belonged) in the Serbian political leadership, Jugović, with Miljko Radonjić and Mihailo Grujović, was expelled from the Supreme Council at the end of 1812. He left Belgrade at the beginning of March 1813, and spent the last months of his life between Bačka Palanka, Timișoara, Vienna and Greater Beccerek (today Zrenjanin), where he died on 7/19. November 1813. He was buried in the port of the Church of the Holy Dormition in Veliki Bečkerek.

He played one of the crucial roles in consolidating Serbian independence and shaping the state structure of Revolutionary Serbia. Jugović's ideas were about a strong, free and independent nation-state that would be the bearer of the national aspirations for liberation and other places where Serbs live. Ivan Jugović (Jovan Savić) along with Dositej Obradović and Ilija Garašanin became the most famous and influential Serbs in Revolutionary Serbia. His role was instrumental in launching the Grandes écoles, whose educational tradition has been inherited by the University of Belgrade.

== See also ==
- List of Serbian Revolutionaries
- Avram Mrazović
- Nikola Vukićević
- Djordje Natošević
