= Pavle Popović (revolutionary) =

Serbian diplomat (c. 1750–1816)

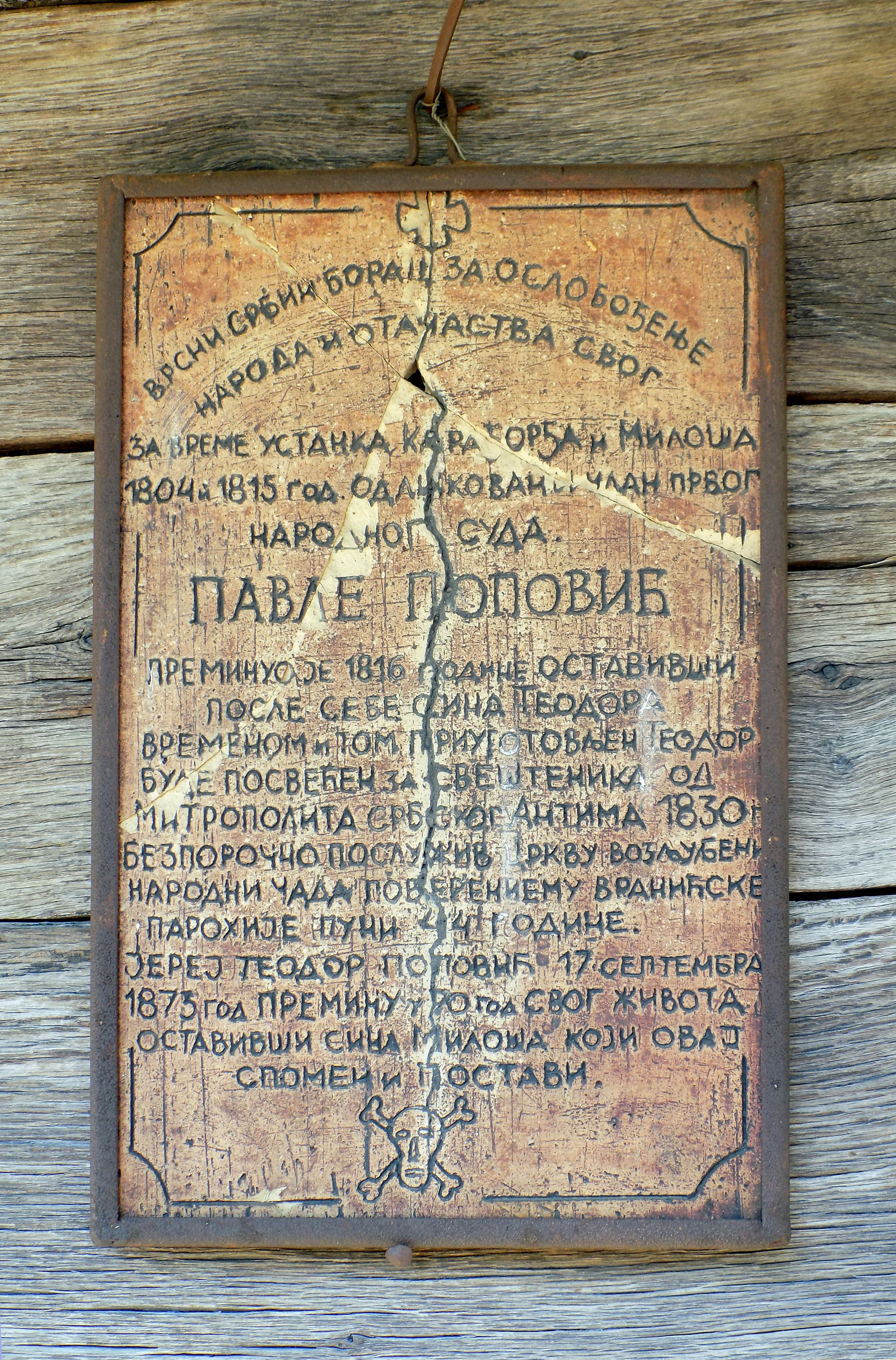
Elijah the Prophet church in Vranić (Barajevo, Municipality of Belgrade, Serbija) - a memorial next to the grave of Pavle Popovic, on the old wooden Church wall

Pavle Popović (c. 1750 – 8 December 1816) was a Serbian warrior, diplomat, and politician. He was a representative in the cabinets of Matija Nenadović, Mladen Milovanović, and Jakov Nenadović. He participated in the First and Second Serbian Uprising and was a member of the People's Office in Belgrade.

He was born in Vranić, where he was a village prince (kmet) and he participated in the fighting against the janissaries of the Ottoman Empire administration in the Belgrade pashaluk around 1800. In 1804 he took part in the fighting, and from 1805 was a member of the Governing State Council for the Belgrade Nahiya and a member of the Grand Provincial Court (Supreme Court) from 1811.

Popović and other members of the Governing State Council became recipients of the coveted Order of St. Anna, 2nd degree, from Russian Tsar Aleksandar I in 1811. The decoration also included a title of the Russian hereditary court and free schooling for children in Russian military cadet schools for all the recipients of the honour. Pavle Popović, together with his cousin Lazar Popović, moved a short distance to an Austrian-occupied territory of Srem in 1813, to Železnik, where he stayed until 1815, then he moved back to Belgrade and joined Prince Miloš Obrenović, who in the same year, after signing a truce with the Turks, appointed him one of the two rotating representatives at the Turkish headquarters at Vračar.

== Popović family ==
Most of the Popović families belonged to the Serbian clergy, even in the ancient past. In the old days, they hailed from Montenegro, and at the beginning of the 18th century moved to Gruž. In Gruž, they joined the political action of Austria preparing the Serbs for the uprising against the Turks. When the Turks discovered that a rebellion was in the offing, the Popovići who were the organizers had to flee from possible revenge. They went to the priest Nikola Radmanović with some other families where they found refuge. In the middle of the 18th century, Todor and Milica Popović came to Vranić with their four sons and nephew. Their sons Dimitrija and Atanasija were priests, and Jovan, who was called "Joka", was the head of the Popović cooperative. Pavle was "born" for public affairs, as Petar Jokić told historian Milan Milićević: "Soldier and advisor as it should be."

== Life as revolutionary and politician ==
After Kočina Krajina, Pavle was elected Knyaz in Vranić. Until the First Serbian Uprising, he fought against the Turks, although he was friends with Aganlija. He escaped the Slaughter of the Knezes in 1804, thanks to that friendship, and on that occasion, he saved his friends Janko Katić, Sima Marković, Milisav Čamdžija, Nikola Nikolajević and others.

In 1805, at the Assembly in Veliki Borak, he was elected a member of the Synod, as a representative of the Belgrade Nahiya. As a well-educated Serb at that time, he was distinguished by diplomatic abilities. During Karađorđe's time, he became a member of the People's Court, and during Miloš Obrenović's time, he was the head of the People's Office. Towards the end of the uprising, he came into conflict with Karađorđe, and when he was convinced that he had left Serbia, he moved with his family to Srem in 1813. When he heard of the Second Serbian Uprising in 1815, he returned to Vranić and continued the fight against the Turks. He was one of the mediators between the Turks and Prince Miloš. Due to the wound under his shoulder, which he could not heal in any way, he returned to Vranić. Before his death, he saved his godfather Sima Marković, with the help of the then Vranje Knyaz Pavle Marinković, from the wrath of Prince Miloš.

== Death ==
On 8 December 1816, he died in Vranić where he was buried in front of the church gate, and on his tomb, it is written: "An excellent Serb, a fighter for the liberation of the people and his fatherland during the uprising of Karađorđe and Prince Miloš in 1804 and 1815, decorated member of the First People's Court, Pavle Popović."

== See also ==
- List of Serbian Revolutionaries

Political offices
New title Serbian uprising	Representative of Belgrade and Grocka nahija (Cabinets of M. Nenadović, M. Milovanović); 27 Aug 1805 – 31 December 1810	Title abolished
