= Botunje =

Botunje Ботуње (Serbian)
- village
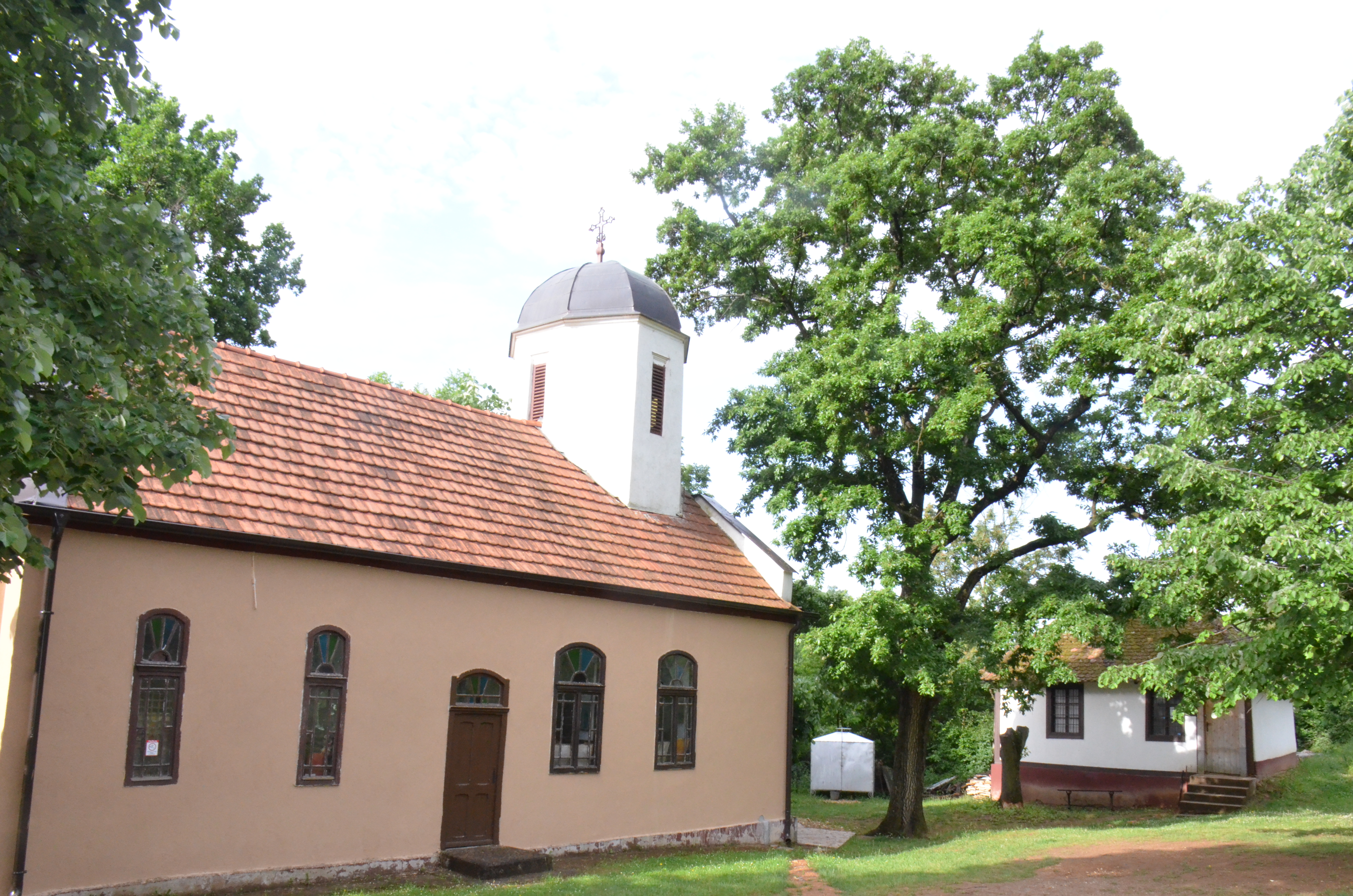
- Botunje church

- Location in Serbia
- Coordinates: 44°3′51″N 21°1′8″E
- Country: Serbia
- Region: Šumadija
- District: Šumadija District
- City district: Kragujevac

Population (2011)
  - Total: 669

Botunje (Serbian Cyrillic: Ботуње) is a village in the Kragujevac city area in the Šumadija District of central Serbia. It is located north-east of the city. According to the 2011 census, the village has a population of 669 people.
