= Konjska Reka =

- Village (Selo)
- Location within Serbia
- Coordinates: 43°53′N 19°24′E
- Country: Serbia
- District: Šumadija
- Municipality: Bajina Bašta

Population (2002)
  - Total: 112
- Time zone: UTC+1 (CET)
  - Summer (DST): UTC+2 (CEST)

Konjska Reka (Serbian Cyrillic: Коњска Река) is a village in the municipality of Bajina Bašta, Serbia. "Konjska Reka" means "horse's river" in Serbian. According to the 2002 census, the village has a population of 112 people.
