= Miljko Radonjić =

Serbian writer, professor and politician-diplomat

Mihailo "Miljko" Radonjić (Serbian Cyrillic: Михаило-Миљко Радоњић; 1770 – 1836) was a Serbian writer, professor at the Belgrade's Velika škola and politician-diplomat. Not much is known about him. He was an educated man. During the Serbian Revolution (1804–1813) he was part of the Serbian rebel government, and served as the Minister of Foreign Affairs as part of the Cabinet of Karađorđe Petrović (1811–12). He taught German at Belgrade's Velika škola (est. 1808).

After the collapse of the uprising in 1813, he went to Trieste where he lived and worked until 1823 as a teacher at the Jovan Militić School in Trieste. After Trieste, he went to Wallachia (today's Romania) where he engaged in trade. Radonjić was the first Foreign Minister in the modern history of Serbian statehood. He was appointed to that position when the previously appointed Milenko Stojković (from January 11, 1811) refused to enter the Governing State Council and accept the duty of minister.

== See also ==
- Serbs in Italy

== Sources ==
- Lopičić, Đorđe N. (2007). Konzularni odnosi Srbije: (1804-1918). Zavod za udžbenike. ISBN 978-86-17-34399-4.

Government offices
Preceded by ???	Minister of Foreign Affairs; 1811–1812	Succeeded by ???
