= Revolutionary Serbia =

Self-proclaimed rebel state in Southeastern Europe (1804–1813)

Coordinates: 44°48′39″N 20°27′45″E

Revolutionary Serbia Устаничка Србија Ustanička Srbija
- 1804–1813
- Flag Coat of arms

- Revolutionary Serbia in 1812
- Status: Self-proclaimed sovereign state
- Capital: Topola; Belgrade
- Official languages: Serbian
- Religion: Eastern Orthodoxy
- Demonym: Serbian, Serb
- Government: Autocracy (de facto)
- Grand Vožd
  - 1804–1813: Karađorđe
- President of the Governing Council
  - 1805–1807: Matija Nenadović
  - 1811–1813: Karađorđe
- History
  - Established: 1804
  - Establishment of government: 1805
  - Russo-Serbian Alliance: 10 July 1807
  - Restoration of Ottoman rule: October 1813
  - Disestablished: 1813
Preceded by	Succeeded by
Sanjak of Smederevo	Sanjak of Smederevo; Principality of Serbia

Revolutionary Serbia, or Karađorđe's Serbia, was a proto-state established in Ottoman Serbia (Sanjak of Smederevo) after the start of the First Serbian Uprising against the Ottoman Empire in 1804, under the leadership of Karađorđe. The Sublime Porte first officially recognised the state as autonomous in January 1807; however, the Serbian revolutionaries rejected the treaty and continued fighting the Ottomans until 1813. Although the first uprising was crushed, the Second Serbian Uprising followed in 1815, resulting in the creation of the Principality of Serbia, which gained semi-independence from the Ottoman Empire in 1817.

== Background ==
The Ottoman Empire saw growing political and economic crises in the mid-18th century, which led to feudal anarchy at the beginning of the 19th century. The European-Ottoman wars and new economic relations broke the Ottoman feudal system and effected the emancipation of Christians in the empire, especially in the Balkans. The rayah (subordinated Christians) were subject to forced labour (known as chiflik), terror from authorities, forced migration, epidemics and starvation. Serbs joined the Austrian wars against the Ottomans and suffered consequences because of their failure. Out of all Serb-inhabited areas in the Rumelia Eyalet, the most homogenous was the Pashalik of Belgrade.

The territory of modern Serbia was outside Austrian focus after the Austro-Turkish War (1737–39) and the peace signed in 1747. Russian victories (1768–74) and intention to liberate the Balkans prompted Austria to ally in 1782, also dividing spheres of influence, with Russia claiming Wallachia and eastwards and Austria west of that down to the Adriatic Sea, with a Serbian state not included in any plan. Austria did not join Russia when it occupied Crimea but instead initiated contact with the agitated Serbs of the Belgrade Pashalik. The Serbs were oppressed by the Ottoman authorities and Janissaries and were eager to form alliances with Christian states in order to liberate themselves. The Ottomans declared war on Russia in 1787, and Austria joined in February 1788. In 1787 the Serbs were violently disarmed by the Ottoman authorities during the Austrian war preparations, with terror carried out by military and bashi-bazouk irregular units leading to people fleeing across the Sava and Danube to Austrian territory and forming the Serbian Free Corps.

Serb volunteers actively engaged Ottoman troops and raided ships on the Danube, and liberated many towns in central Serbia; however, they were denied much-needed aid and equipment. Successful Ottoman counter-operations and terror led to further flight to Austria, numbering 50,000 by late June 1788. South Banat was occupied by the Ottomans, and a truce was signed, lasting until the summer of 1789. The threat of a Prussian-Ottoman alliance prompted the Austrians to launch a campaign in August 1789, leading to the conquest of Belgrade and an advance into the interior. The Austrian court increasingly sought to end the conflict and peace was signed in August 1791.

The Porte gave amnesty to participants on the Austrian side and banned the Janissaries from the Pashalik. The Janissaries had earlier been part of the backbone of Ottoman military power but had lost their importance in the 18th century, becoming a source of disorder, due to lack of discipline and bad morals. In 1793, the Janissary Pashas revolted, raiding the lands and threatening the Sultan's rule, with Pazvantoğlu taking over the Sanjak of Vidin and the Janissaries briefly occupying Belgrade. After expelling the Janissaries, the Porte appointed Hadji Mustafa Pasha as Vizier of Belgrade in July 1793, and he was remembered positively among the Serbs for the improved situation in the Pashalik through reforms. In order to rid the threat of the Janissaries, a Serb militia in Ottoman service was established, numbering some 15,000, many of whom had gained military training and experience in the last war. The Janissaries were decisively defeated by the militia in another attempt to occupy the Pashalik, which showed that the militia was well-organized, disciplined and trained. As a reward, the Porte issued firmans (decrees) which acknowledged Serb self-governing privileges, better socio-economic status, the right to renew and build churches, and to lead security detachments for maintaining road safety and apprehending robbers. Muslim retaliation and entry to Serb villages was forbidden, as to not make way for conflict. This significant improvement did not last long, as new conflicts with Janissaries arose and the threat of the French in Egypt made the Porte allow for the return of Janissaries in early 1799. The Janissaries renewed terror against the Serbs, captured Belgrade and Mustafa Pasha in July 1801, murdered him in December, then ruled the Pashalik with a Vizier as their puppet. The leading Janissaries, called the Dahije, abolished the Serbs' firmans, banished unsupportive sipahi and invited Muslims from neighbouring sanjaks which they used to control the Serbs. The banished sipahi and loyal Muslims organized a rebellion against the Janissaries with Serb support in mid-1802, but it failed, resulting in further oppression. The "Slaughter of the Knezes" led to the uprising against the Dahije in 1804 and the start of the Serbian Revolution.

== History ==
The peasant rebellion against the Dahije expanded into a national uprising in 1805. The rebel army had defeated the Sultan's army at Ivankovac and proclaimed Smederevo the capital in November 1805. Laws passed by the Governing Council and People's Assembly in October-November 1805 represented the first constitutional acts establishing the Council as the executive institution. The revolutionary government organised and supervised various aspects of government, including administration, economy, army supply, law and order, justice, and foreign policy. The rebels won important victories at the Battle of Mišar against Pazvantoğlu and at the Battle of Deligrad, and the capture of Belgrade meant control of the entire Pashalik by December 1806. The rebellion stirred up parts of Bosnia, northern Macedonia, the Vidin-Belogradchik area and encouraged the armatoloi of Greece. At the same time, the Ottomans declared war on Russia. The victory at Mišar, in which 12,000 rebels defeated 20,000 troops of Bosnian beys, resonated among Bosnia's Christians, who, because of it, took up a defensive stance against Muslim violence.

A treaty which granted Serbia autonomy was agreed in January 1807 but was subsequently rejected by the rebels, who sought Russian aid for independence, and signed an alliance with the Russian Empire on 10 July 1807. The combined Serbian-Russian forces defeated an Ottoman army at Malajnica, and there was a political crisis at the Porte which led to the execution of Sultan Selim by Mustafa IV, who was subsequently deposed by Mahmud II. Another treaty would have given Serbia significant autonomy, but border disputes led to failure. The Serbian-Russian cooperation proved ineffective, however, and the rebels had a defeat at the Battle of Čegar in May 1809 due to lack of coordination and the mustering of a combined, stronger Ottoman force of neighbouring pashaliks.

In August 1809, an Ottoman army marched on Belgrade, causing a mass exodus of people across the Danube. In July 1810, Russian troops arrived in Serbia for the second time, and they provided military cooperation by sending weapons, ammunition and medical supplies. Faced with the impending disaster, Karađorđe sought help from the Habsburgs and Napoleon, but to no avail. At this point, the Serbian rebels shifted to a defensive strategy, focusing on holding their territories rather than making further gains. Meanwhile, Russia, preoccupied with a French invasion, prioritised signing a final peace treaty and acted against Serbia's interests. In particular, the Serbs were not informed of the negotiations and only learned of the final terms from the Ottomans. This second Russian retreat occurred at the height of Karađorđe's power and the rise of Serbian expectations. The Treaty of Bucharest, signed in May 1812, contained Article 8, which dealt with the Serbs. According to the treaty, Serbian fortifications were to be destroyed unless they were of value to the Ottomans. Pre-1804, Ottoman installations were to be reoccupied and garrisoned by Ottoman troops. In return, the Porte promised a general amnesty and certain autonomous rights. The Serbs were granted control over the administration of their own affairs and the collection and payment of a fixed tribute. The reaction in Serbia was strong, with particular concern over the reoccupation of fortresses and towns and the expectation of feared reprisals.

The Ottomans turned to defeat the rebels and retook Belgrade, taking advantage of the Russian retreat to reconquer Serbia and Wallachia in 1813. Most of the rebel leadership and some 100,000 Serbs crossed the Sava and Danube into the Habsburg Monarchy.

A short-lived rebellion failed in late 1814, but the Ottoman terror pushed the Serbs to the Second Serbian Uprising.

== Military ==
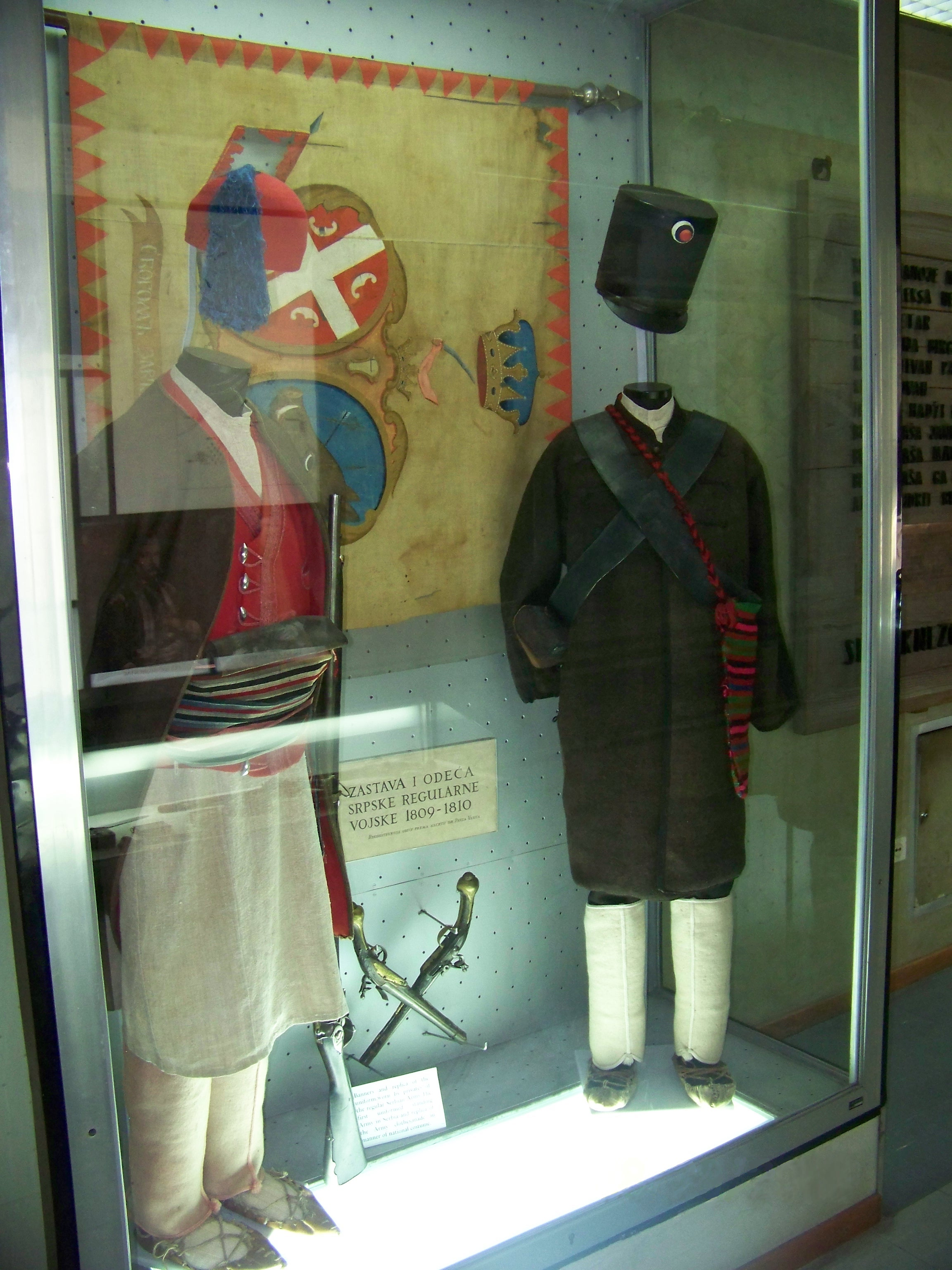
Flag and uniforms dating to 1809–10

The Serbian rebel army was commanded by Karađorđe, the most able of the vojvoda in Šumadija, a Serbian Free Corps veteran described as physically strong, decisive, violent, heroic and fearsome.

The army consisted of local rebels, commoners belonging to the rayah (Ottoman tax-paying lower class), without wages but with some structure resembling a standing army. Initially, the rebel army was a militia of armed civilians, with troop size depending on liberated territories. In the initial years, all able men were required to join as soldiers. Every soldier took care of his own equipment and weapons, while the government provided food when he was forced to fight on another front far from home. The supply train (Serbian: ratna komora) transferred soldiers to other fronts as the uprising required.

The military organization was territorial, divided into units of desetina ("tenth"), četa ("company") and bataljon ("battalion"), formed according to the local administrative divisions of knežina (villages under the responsibility of a knez) or nahija (a larger group of villages), which gave their names to the individual units. There were three combat arms, the infantry, cavalry and artillery.

The military training initially followed Austrian routines, as the first instructors came either from the Military Frontier or were local veterans of the Free Corps. With the Russian-Serbian alliance and the arrival of Russian troops in 1807, the training followed Russian routines. For a period following this, there were two military training divisions in Serbia, a Russian in the east and Austrian in the west; however, by the end, the Russian principle prevailed.

== Society ==
The Serb population was patriarchal, with old customary laws, and lived in family cooperatives (zadruga). The zadruga and village were the backbone of social organization. The rebellion echoed throughout the Balkans, and Serbs from southern Hungary and the Military Frontier–peasants, army officers, priests, teachers and lawyers–massively crossed into Serbia and provided capable volunteers and diplomats, ministers and educators.

Orthodox priests and monks were active in planning and maintaining the rebellion; some armed themselves and became rebel leaders, consequently entering the rebel government. The clergy joined local politics, with judicial organisation in autumn 1805 deciding that one priest each shall enter the village-, knežina and nahija courts. The Habsburg Serb metropolitan Stevan Stratimirović was a chief coordinator of funding and arming the troops.

The Belgrade Higher School (later university) was founded by the Minister of Education Dositej Obradović in 1808.

== Politics ==
The government consisted of the Governing Council, the People's Assembly, and Karađorđe. The Council organised and supervised the administration, economy, army supply, order and peace, judiciary, and foreign policy. The intellectual leadership included Orthodox archpriest Matija Nenadović and political support from educated Habsburg Serbs such as Dositej Obradović and Sava Tekelija.

The term "Serbian nation" was used in diplomatic correspondence, and the coat of arms of the medieval Nemanjić dynasty was adopted. The rebels aimed to restore the medieval Serbian state and include the neighbouring regions, with attacks being coordinated with the Prince-Bishop of Montenegro Petar I and the tribes of Montenegro and Herzegovina. An Ottoman official imprisoned in Serbia in 1806 reported that the Serbs "as King Lazar once went to Kosovo so they will all come to Kosovo again". There were various plans to restore a Serbian state in the 18th century, with either Habsburg or Russian support. While having modest political demands in the initial phase, seeking limited autonomy and protection from Austria and Russia, they demanded and claimed independence by late 1806. Karađorđe invited all the Christians of Albania, Rumelia and Bulgaria to join the Serbs in arms in 1807, seeking wider Balkan support.

The rebels opted for a Russian alliance in 1807. By 1809, Karađorđe turned to France after heavy losses and disappointment with Austria and Russia, and offered the French the strategic town of Šabac in exchange for negotiating a new status for Serbia. The French viewed the Serbs as a Russian instrument. In 1810, Karađorđe proposed a South Slavic protectorate under Napoleon, who declined, as the French-Ottoman alliance was in effect. The rebels once again turned to Russia, as the Habsburg alliance was impractical owing to Serbian attachment to the Russian campaign. Russia abandoned Serbia after the Treaty of Bucharest (1812), in which the Serbs had demanded independence. The Ottoman army crushed the rebellion in autumn 1813 as Serbia lacked any external support.

=== Government ===
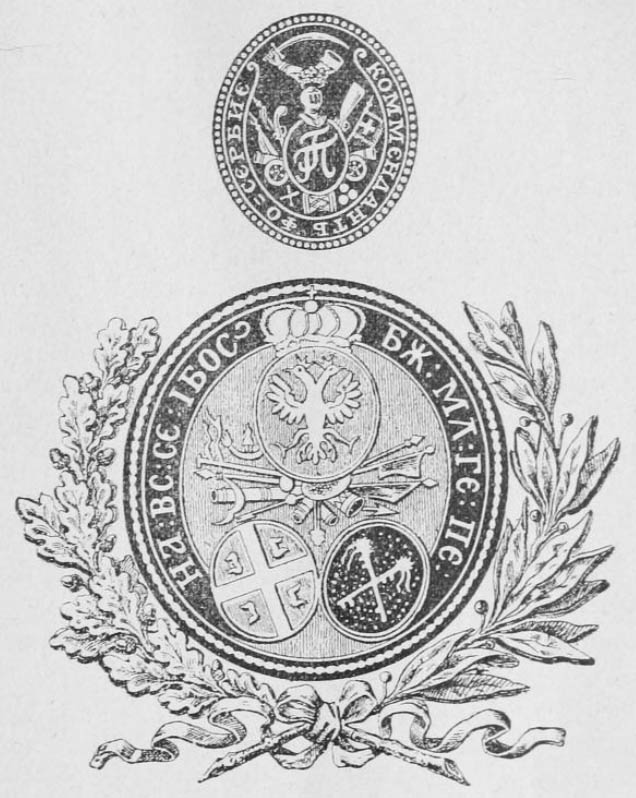
Seals of the Grand Vožd

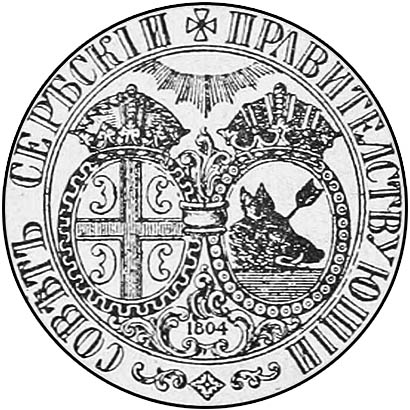
Seal of the Governing Council

The Orašac Assembly in February 1804 saw the election of Karađorđe to lead the uprising against "Turkish" rule. Military success led to the formation of its own government in liberated territory and cities, replacing the Ottoman system with both military and civil authority. Courts (called magistrates) and judges were appointed at the first national assembly held in Ostružnica in April 1804, after Karađorđe asked of the nahija chiefs (starešina) to bring two or three "main men" for the election of judges. The initial phase of the uprising saw a rise in crime, with some rebels engaging in deviant behaviour to enrich themselves. It was decided that the army in liberated territory would march towards Belgrade after the assembly, so the judicial system needed to be put in place hastily to maintain law and order in the army's absence. Orthodox archpriest Matija Nenadović worked on the regulations, also using some paragraphs from the medieval legal code Zakonopravilo, with other points being contemporary reflections on rebel opportunities, commoner perceptions, or showing Austrian influence. Lesser wrongdoings would be judged according to the trusted judge's "clear conscience" and traditional practices. The first court was established in the Valjevo nahija by Nenadović and had a judicial, administrative and police function, also standing for the organisation of ordinary life outside the rebellion and the mobilisation of troops and necessities. At the same time, church courts were responsible for religious matters and education and included laymen. A problem lay in the chiefs' view that they were independent and untouchable in their nahija, which urged strengthening civil government and excluding them from judicial work. The chiefs had taken upon themselves to act as the law in a despotic way (as Karađorđe did). They based their rule on power, military prowess, and wealth, often as former knezes (village holders), kmets (serfs), or members of knez families from the time of Hadji Mustafa Pasha (1793–1801). Karađorđe is known to have often had the last word and to be strict in sentencing, while corruption is evident in him acting as the supreme judge, ordering changes to sentences and punishments, such as freeing, giving amnesty to individuals or handing death sentences (and executing them).

In the first year, Karađorđe held supreme military control of the territory, which led other military leaders to want to limit his power. In response, the Governing Council (Praviteljstvujušči Sovjet) was established in 1805, upon recommendation of Russian Minister of Foreign Affairs Czartoryski and the proposal of some leaders (such as Matija and Jakov Nenadović, Milan Obrenović, Sima Marković). Laws passed by the Governing Council and People's Assembly (Narodna Skupština) in October-November 1805 represented the first constitutional acts establishing the Council as the executive institution. The People's Assembly, made up of community leaders (because of their reputation and position) rather than elected officials, gathered to decide important matters such as political and military issues. Karađorđe became Assembly chairman (Serbian: Председатељ верховни Совјета народна), being the commanding general with certain diplomatic, administrative and judicial functions.

Austrian lawyer Boža Grujović, the first secretary, and archpriest Matija Nenadović, the first president, believed the Council would become the government of the new Serbian state. Grujović was instrumental in its establishment, and he drew inspiration from the French Revolution, with Nenadović having the most important role in establishing the Council and it being the most active during his presidency. Courts were established in all nahija. The courts and Council only managed to somewhat reduce the voivode involvement in judicial matters (and extrajudicial abuse) and were unable to adjudicate them due to their power and the fact that they influenced the election of judges and council members. Following the Russian alliance of 1807, diplomat Konstantin Rodofinikin drafted a plan to establish a Serbian "senate" (Serbian: Правитељствујушчи сенат сербски) which would hold power with Karađorđe acting as non-hereditary Prince (књаз/knjaz), aimed to limit his powers, but the Russian emperor never approved it. Despite initial military successes, the rebel leaders were seldom on good terms, and constant infighting plagued their camp. In the west, Jakov Nenadović was the principal figure, while in the east, Milenko Stojković and Petar Dobrnjac were. The latter two opposed Karađorđe's attempts to create a centralised state, fearing that it would diminish their own power. Matija Nenadović even came to heads with his uncle Jakov when he, for a time, opposed acknowledging Karađorđe's supreme rule. In October 1807, the Council ordered courts to be established in towns and villages, which Karađorđe and his voivodes worked against by pressuring judges, preventing people from appearing in court, and scrapping sentences to protect friends and family.

The Assembly in Belgrade adopted the second Constitutional Act in 1808, which recognised Karađorđe as hereditary "leader" (предводитељ/predvoditelj) and the Council as the judicial institution. Although the Constitution obliged cooperation between Karađorđe and the Council, some voivodes still wanted to limit his powers. The third Act came in 1811 with the intention to end the attempts of dissenting commanders, Karađorđe receiving the title of "Vožd" (again, hereditary) and some voivodes swearing an oath first to him (as a monarch) and then the "fatherland", promising also to bring any rival to court. Karađorđe in turn promised to lead the people justly, stay committed to the Russian alliance, rule alongside the Council, which held judicial power, and not permit the abuse of power. As the president of the Council, he could nominate ministers and other members. Karađorđe held almost unlimited power as head of state and government.

Date	Governing Council members
August 1805	Mladen Milovanović, Avram Lukić, Jovan Protić, Pavle Popović, Velisav Stanojlović, Janko Đurđević, Đurica Stočić, Milisav Ilijić, Ilija Marković, Vasilije Radojičić (Popović, Jović), Milutin Vasić, Jevto Savić-Čotrić, Dositej Obradović and Petar Novaković Čardaklija
End of 1805	Archpriest Matija Nenadović (president), and members Jakov Nenadović, Janko Katić, Milenko Stojković, Luka Lazarević and Milan Obrenović.
November 1810	Jakov Nenadović (president), and members Pavle Popović, Velisav Perić, Vasilije Jović (Radojičić), Janko Đurđević, Dositej Obradović, Ilija Marković, and secretaries Stevan Filipović and Mihailo Grujović.

In 1811, the government system was reorganised, with the formation of ministries (popečiteljstva) instead of nahija representatives.

Ministries	Ministers
President	Karađorđe (s. –1813)
International Affairs	Milenko Stojković (s. 1811); Miljko Radonić (s. 1811–12)
Education	Dositej Obradović (s. 1811); Ivan Jugović (s. 1811–12)
Military	Mladen Milovanović (s. 1811–13)
Internal Affairs	Jakov Nenadović (s. 1811–13)
Law	Petar Dobrnjac (s. 1811); Ilija Marković (s. 1811–13)
Finance	Sima Marković (s. 1811–13)
Secretaries	Mihailo Grujović (1st) and Stevan Filipović (2nd)

== Maps ==
Territory of Revolutionary Serbia

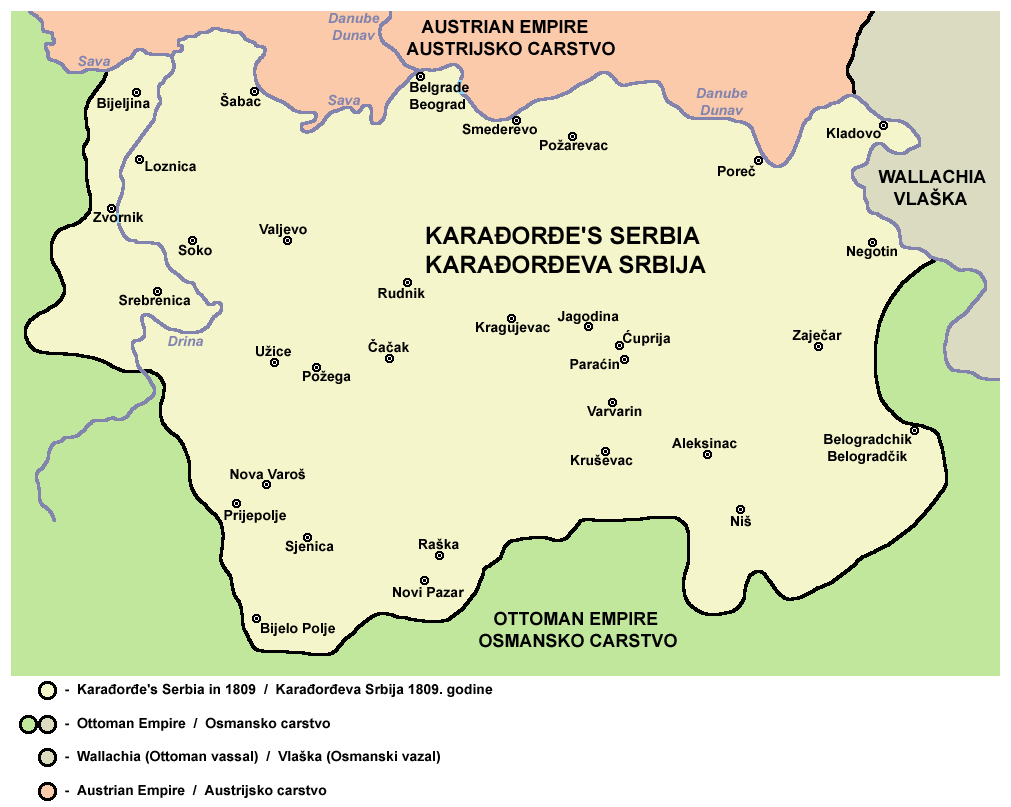
Revolutionary Serbia in 1809

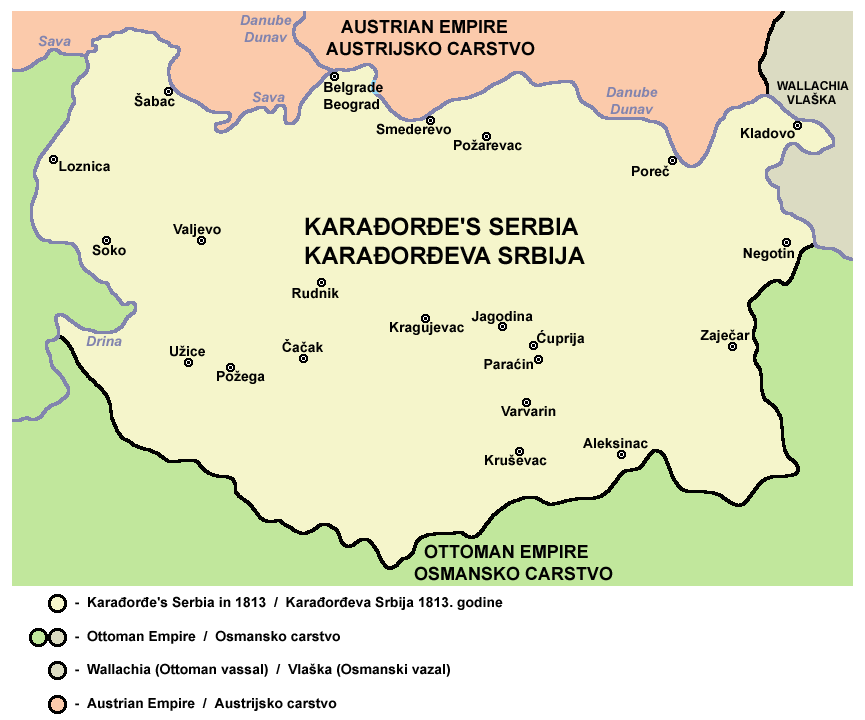
Revolutionary Serbia in 1813

== See also ==
- Timeline of the Serbian Revolution

== Sources ==
- Bataković, Dušan T. (2006). "A Balkan-Style French Revolution? The 1804 Serbian Uprising in European Perspective". Balcanica (XXXVI). Belgrade: Балканолошки институт: 113–128. doi:10.2298/BALC0536113B.
- Bodrožić, Đuro (2022). "Vojska i država: počeci moderne srpske vojske". Nacionalni Interes. 44 (2): 29–46. doi:10.22182/ni.4222022.2 (inactive 8 November 2026).
- Čubrilović, Vasa (1982). Istorija političke misli u Srbiji XIX veka. Narodna knjiga.
- Deretić, Nataša (2014). "Pojavni oblici korupcije u ustaničkoj Srbiji (1804-1815)". Zbornik radova Pravnog fakulteta. 48 (2). Novi Sad: 307–323.
- Janković, Dragoslav (1955). Istorija države i prava Srbije u XIX veku. Nolit.
- Jelavich, Charles; Jelavich, Barbara (2000) [1977]. The Establishment of the Balkan National States, 1804–1920. Vol. 8 (4th ed.). Seattle, Washington: University of Washington Press. ISBN 978-0-29580-360-9.
- Jokanović, Ivan (2022). "Position of the Head of State in Serbia in the XIXth and XXth Centuries". Romanian Journal of Legal History. 2 (1).
- Nedeljković, Slaviša D.; Đorđević, Miloš Z. (2015). "Политичке прилике у београдском пашалуку у предвечерје српске револуције (1787-1804)". Teme. XXXIX (3). Niš: 965–969.
