= Konstantin Rodofinikin =

Russian Imperial diplomat

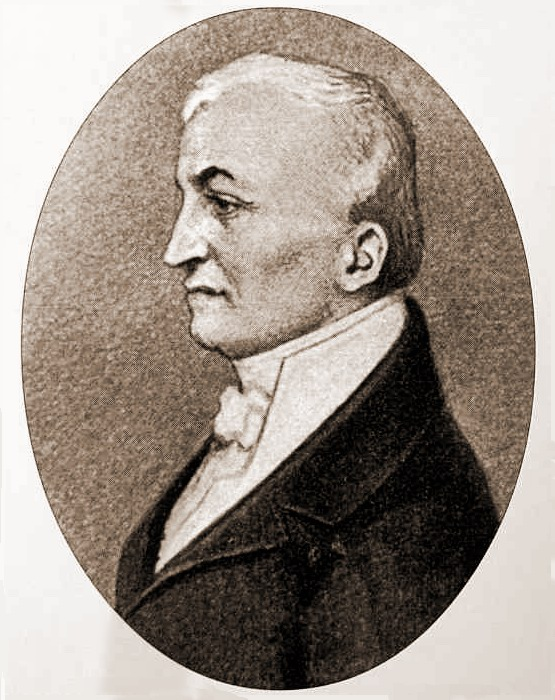
Konstantin Rodofinikin(1760-1838)

Konstantin Rodofinikin (Russian: Константин Родофиникин; 1760–1838), contemporarily known simply as Rodophinikin, was a Russian Imperial diplomat, agent in Revolutionary Serbia (1807–13), and member of the State Council.

He came from a Greek noble family, born on Rhodes. He served in the military, joining the Pereyaslav Cossack regiment in 1783, and then entered the Collegium of Commerce in 1786.
