= Jakov Nenadović =

Serbian politician (1765–1836)

- Јаков Ненадовић
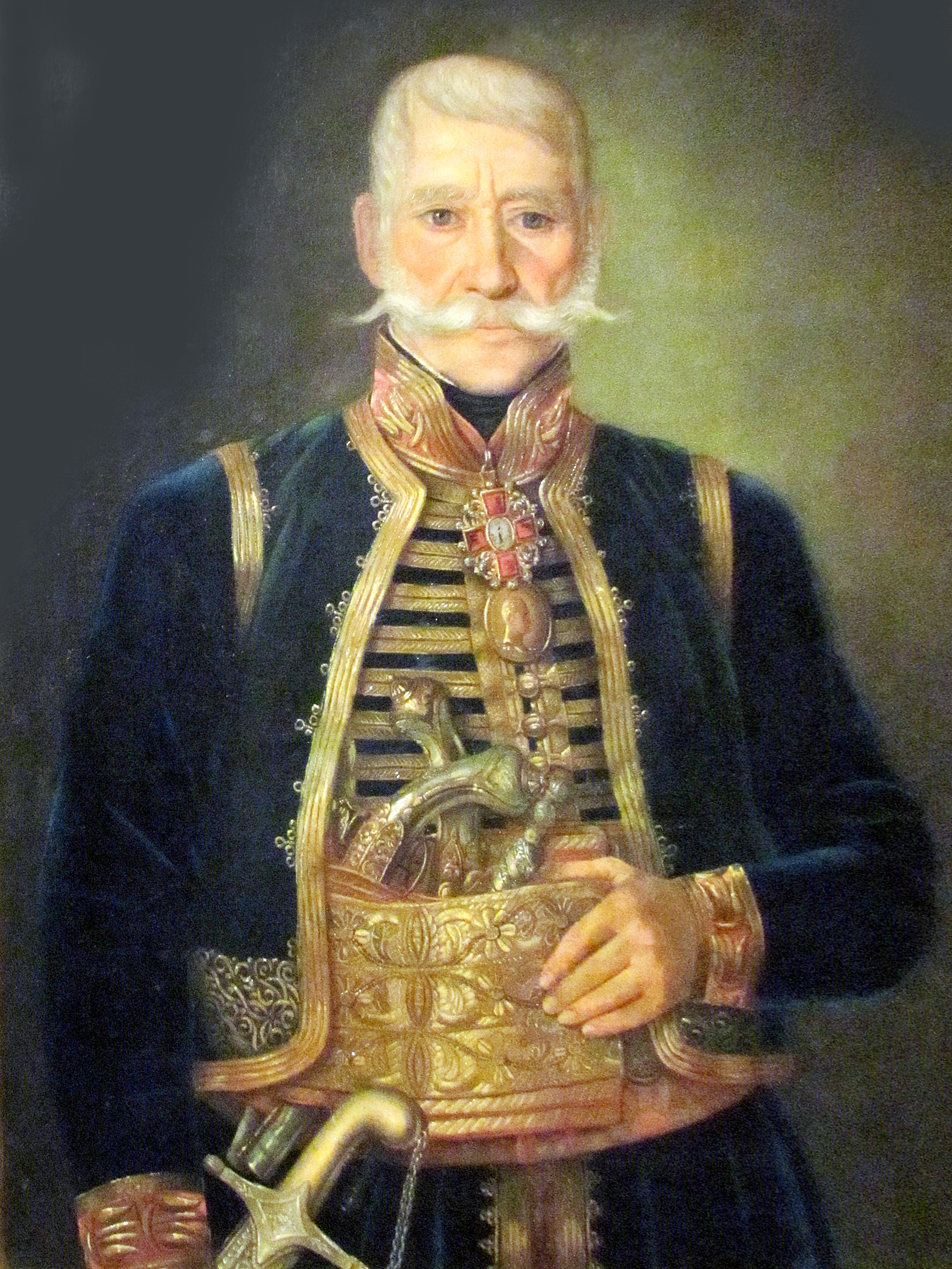

Minister of Internal Affairs
- In office 1811–1813
- Monarch: Karađorđe
- Preceded by: Position established
- Succeeded by: Karađorđe

Prime Minister of Serbia
- In office 31 December 1810 – 22 January 1811
- Preceded by: Mladen Milovanović
- Succeeded by: Karađorđe

Personal details
- Born: 1765 Brankovina, Ottoman Empire
- Died: 1836 (aged 71) Vienna, Austria
- Party: Independent

Military service
- Allegiance: Revolutionary Serbia
- Years of service: 1804–1813
- Battles/wars: First Serbian Uprising: Battle of Svileuva; Battle of Mišar; Battle of Loznica

Jakov Nenadović (Serbian Cyrillic: Јаков Ненадовић; 1765–1836) was a Serbian voivode and politician who served as the prime minister of Serbia from 31 December 1810 to 22 January 1811. He was the first Serbian interior minister. Nenadović was the most influential figure in Serbia at the time beside Karađorđe, his greatest rival, and Janko Katić.

== Life ==
Jakov was the younger brother of Aleksa Nenadović (1749–1804), a Serbian nobleman who held a province around Valjevo. He was grandnephew of Grigorije Nenadović, metropolitan of Raška and Valjevo. His brother was executed in the Slaughter of the Dukes on January 31, 1804, which sparked the First Serbian Uprising.

Jakov immediately joined the Serbian rebels, and after the victory in Svileuva (1804) he became one of the most distinguished commanders and persons of western Serbia. He acquired his ammunitions and weapons from Syrmia, then part of Austria. In March 1804, he attacked Šabac. Jakov was one of the founders of the Praviteljstvujušči sovjet serbski (Serbian government), of which Prota Mateja Nenadović, his nephew (the son of Aleksa), was the first Prime Minister. He headed the government of Serbia from 1810 to 1811.

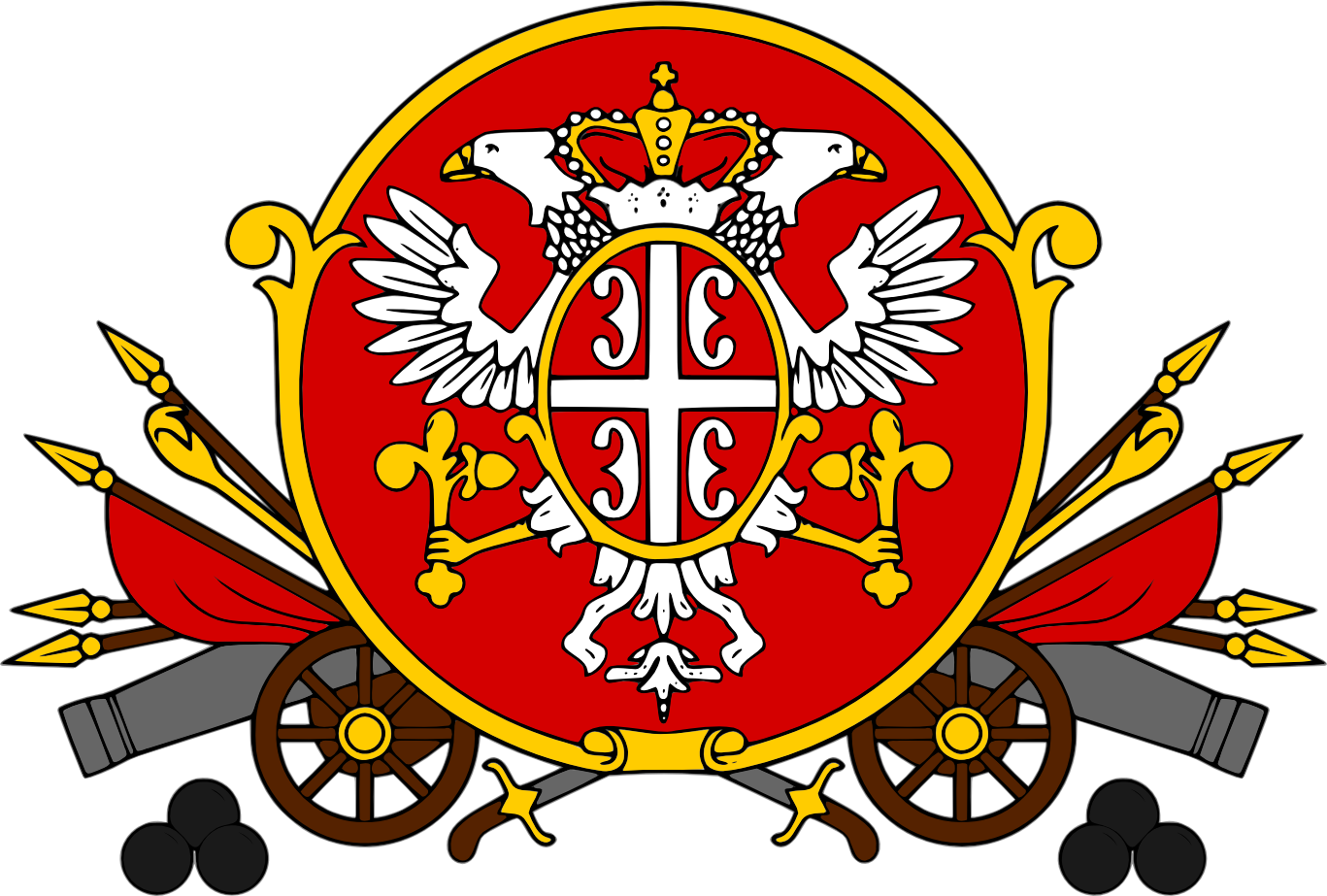
Coat of Arms on Jakov's Tower.

In 1813, for the purpose of armory, a tower bearing the Nenadović name was built next to a road leading to Šabac, at the edge of Kličevac hill, by Jakov and his son Jevrem. After the failed uprising, Nenadović followed Karadjordje to Bessarabia in 1814, and in 1816 to Imperial Russia in St. Peterburg to confer with Tsar Alexander I of Russia over the state of affairs in the Balkans, then re-occupied by the Ottoman Turks. Later on, he settled in Vienna, where he died in 1836. His granddaughter, Persida Nenadović (the daughter of Jevrem), married Alexander Karađorđević, Prince of Serbia, the son of Karadjordje.

Government offices
Preceded by Mladen Milovanović	Prime Minister of Serbia; 1810–1811	Succeeded by Karađorđe Petrović
Military offices
New title	vojvoda of Valjevo nahija 1804–1811	Succeeded by Jevrem Nenadović
Other offices
Preceded by Aleksa Nenadović	knez of Tamnava; 1804	Succeeded by Matija Nenadović
