= Mladen Milovanović =

Serbian politician (c. 1760–1823)

- Младен Миловановић
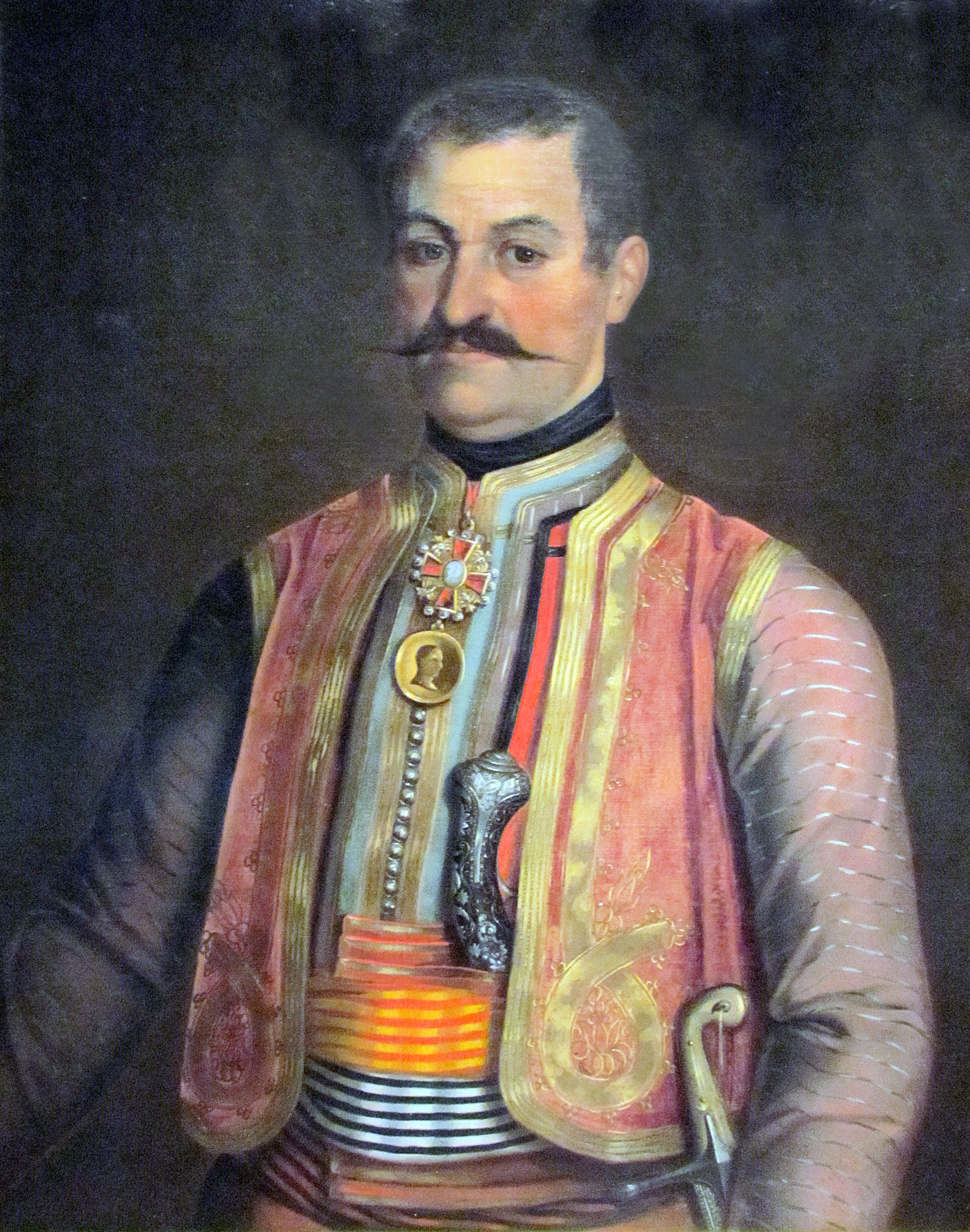

Prime Minister of Serbia
- In office April 1807 – 31 December 1810
- Monarch: Karađorđe
- Preceded by: Mateja Nenadović
- Succeeded by: Jakov Nenadović

Minister of Defence
- In office 1811–1813
- Preceded by: Position established
- Succeeded by: Toma Vučić Perišić

Personal details
- Born: c. 1760 Botunje, Ottoman Empire
- Died: 1823 Zlatibor, Principality of Serbia
- Party: Independent

Mladen Milovanović (Serbian Cyrillic: Младен Миловановић; c. 1760 – 1823) was a Serbian merchant and politician who served as the prime minister of Serbia from 1807 to 1810. A notable voivode during the First Serbian Uprising, he briefly served as a representative in the cabinet of Matija Nenadović and was the first minister of defence from 1811 to 1813.

== Biography ==
Born to Drobnjak clan ancestry, he became a wealthy merchant prior to the first uprising in goods trading. He had a strong influence on Karadjordje.

During the Slaughter of the Knezes (January 1804), Mladen was captured and imprisoned by Kučuk-Alija, the worst of the four leaders of the Dahije. During the Burning of the Inns, Karađorđe exchanged 18 Janissaries for Mladen's release, and threatened Kučuk-Alija that he would raze Kragujevac if he didn't comply. Mladen was sent to Topola and the captives to Kragujevac.

After the suppression of the uprising in 1813, he went abroad, and in 1814 arrived in Khotyn, then part of the Imperial Russia, where he remained until 1821. Milovanović was one of the wealthiest people in Serbia of his time, which was a matter of controversy.

He was killed in 1823 while crossing over the Zlatibor and on the road to Montenegro, by order of Prince Miloš Obrenović. In April 1823, Prince Miloš gave the order in Kragujevac to Serdar of Zlatibor Jovan Micić to escort Milovanović to Lim, and further transfer him to Montenegro. Micić's associates Leko and Simo Kovač killed him in the Očka mountain on Zlatibor during an alleged escape attempt by Milovanović.

== Descendants ==
His only daughter Jovanka Milovanović (1792–1880) was married to a prominent Serbian politician, Voivode Jevrem Nenadović (1793-1867). His daughter Persida Nenadović was the Princess Consort of Serbia (as the wife of Alexander Karadjordjević), while his great grandson was the King Peter I of Serbia.

== See also ==
- List of prime ministers of Serbia

== Sources ==
- Batalaka, Lazar Arsenijević (1898). Историја српског устанка: део први [History of the Serbian Uprising: Part One]. Vol. I. Izd. Batalakinoga fonda – via Google Books.
- Milićević, Milan Đ. (1888). Поменик знаменитих људи у српског народа новијега доба. Издање Чупићеве задужбине – via Archive.org.
- Nenadović, Konstantin N. (1884). Живот и дела великог Ђорђа Петровића Кара-Ђорђа. Vol. II (1 ed.). Vienna: У Штампарији Јована Н. Вернаја – via Google Books.
- Novaković, Stojan (1904). Устанак на дахије 1804 [Uprising against the Dahije]. Штампано у Државној штампарији – via Archive.org.
- Ristić, Milovan (1957). "Први командант Београда под Карађорђем – Младен Миловановић у 1807 години" (PDF). ГОДИШЊАК. IV. Музеј града Београда: 159–176.

Government offices
Preceded by Mateja Nenadović	Prime Minister of Serbia; 1807–1810	Succeeded by Jakov Nenadović
