= Matija Nenadović =

Serbian historian and politician (1777–1854)

- Матија Ненадовић
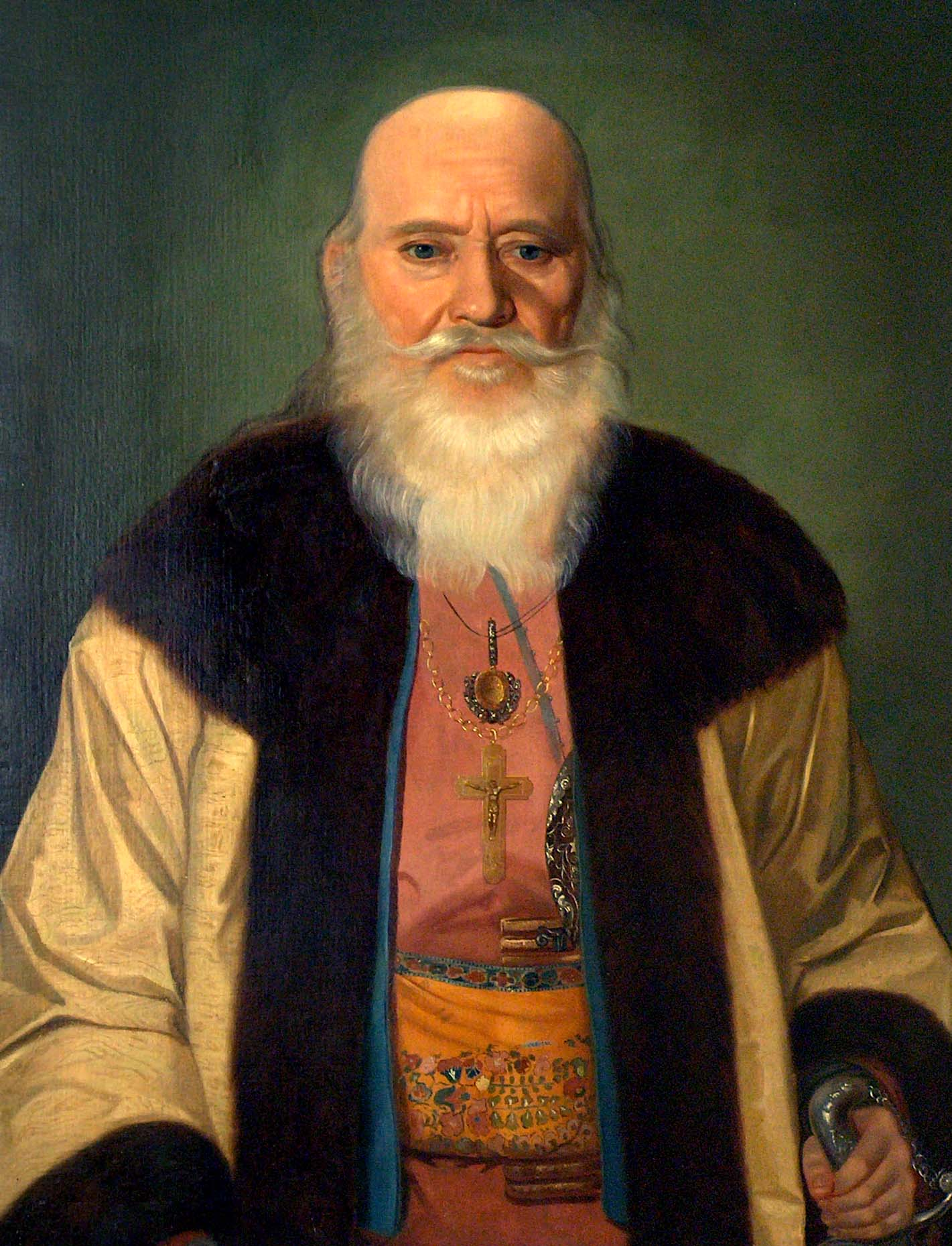
- Portrait of Nenadović, c. 1852

Prime Minister of Serbia
- In office 27 August 1805 – April 1807
- Monarch: Karađorđe
- Preceded by: Position established
- Succeeded by: Mladen Milovanović

Personal details
- Born: 26 February 1777 Brankovina, Ottoman Empire (present-day Serbia)
- Died: 11 December 1854 (aged 77) Valjevo, Principality of Serbia
- Party: Independent
- Awards: Order of Glory
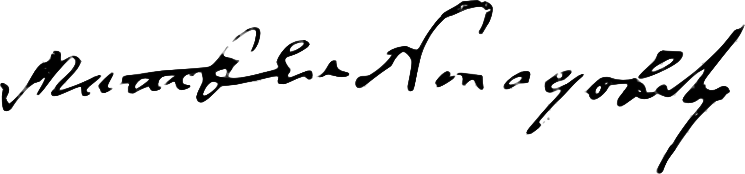
- Signature

Matija Nenadović (Serbian Cyrillic: Матија Ненадовић; 26 February 1777 – 11 December 1854), also known as Prota Mateja, was a Serbian archpriest, writer, and politician who served as the first prime minister of Serbia from 1805 to 1807. He was a notable leader in the First Serbian Uprising.

== Life ==
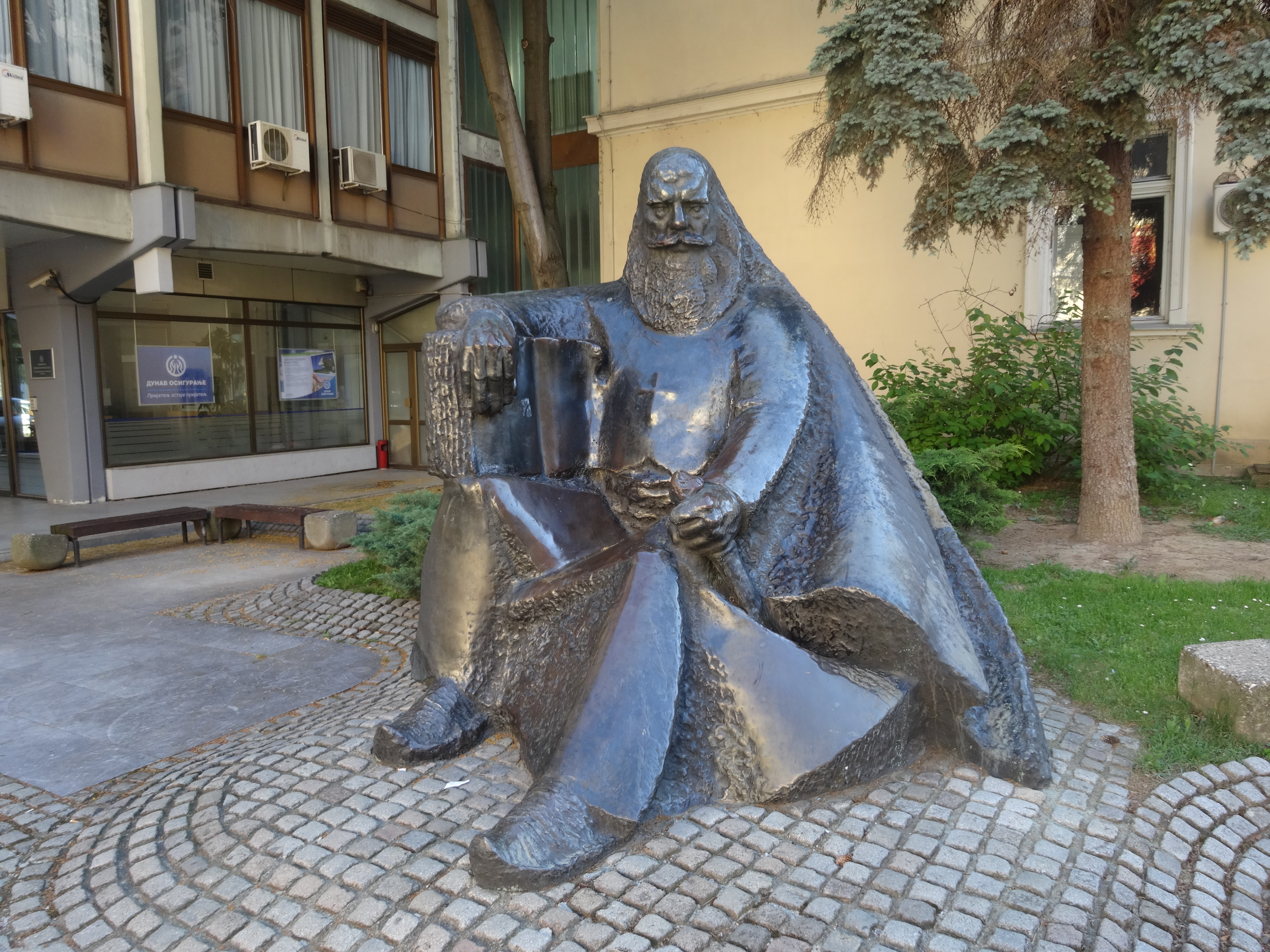
Matija Nenadović's monument in Valjevo

At the age of sixteen he was ordained priest, and a few years later was promoted to an archpriest (Serbian: Протојереј), colloquially prota (Serbian: прота) of Valjevo. His father, Aleksa Nenadović, Knez (chief magistrate) of the district of Valjevo, was one of the most popular and respected public men among the Serbs at the beginning of the 19th century. When the four leaders of the Janissaries of the Sanjak of Smederevo (the so-called Dahias) thought that the only way to prevent a general rising of the Serbs was to intimidate them by murdering all their principal men, Aleksa Nenadović (1749–1804) was one of the first victims. The policy of the Dahias, instead of preventing, did actually and immediately provoke a general insurrection of the Serbs against the Turks.

Prota Mateja became the deputy-commander of the insurgents of the Valjevo district (1804), but did not hold the post for long, as Karađorđe sent him in 1805 on a secret mission to St. Petersburg, and afterwards employed him almost constantly as Serbia's diplomatic envoy to Russia, Austria, Bucharest and Constantinople. After the fall of Karadjordje (1813), the new leader of the Serbs, Miloš Obrenović, sent Prota Mateja as representative of Serbia to the Congress of Vienna (1814–1815), where he pleaded the Serbian cause indefatigably. During that mission he often saw Lord Castlereagh, and for the first time the Serbian national interests were brought to the knowledge of British statesmen.

He had a brother, Sima, a voivode. His paternal uncle, Jakov Nenadović, had an equally important role in Serbia, as the first Interior Minister. Matija Nenadović had a son, Ljubomir Nenadović.

Nenadović was a Freemason.

== Works ==
Prota Mateja's memoirs (Memoari Prote Mateje Nenadovića) are the most valuable authority for the history of the first and Second Serbian uprising against the Turks. He also authored other memoirs and documentary literature.

== Legacy ==
He is included in the book The 100 most prominent Serbs.

== See also ==
- List of Serbian Revolutionaries

== Sources ==
- Milićević, Milan (1888). Поменик знаменитих људи у српскога народа новијега доба. Srpska kraljevska štamparija. pp. 408–412. ( Public domain)
- Srpska književna zadruga (1893). "Memoari Prote Matije Nenadovića". Srpska književna zadruga 9.

Political offices
New title Serbian revolution	Prime Minister of Serbia; 27 Aug 1805 – Jan 1807	Succeeded by Mladen Milovanović
Other offices
Preceded by Jakov Nenadović	knez of Tamnava; 1805–	Succeeded by Jevrem Nenadović
