= Ičko's House =

Town house in Serbia

Ičko’s House
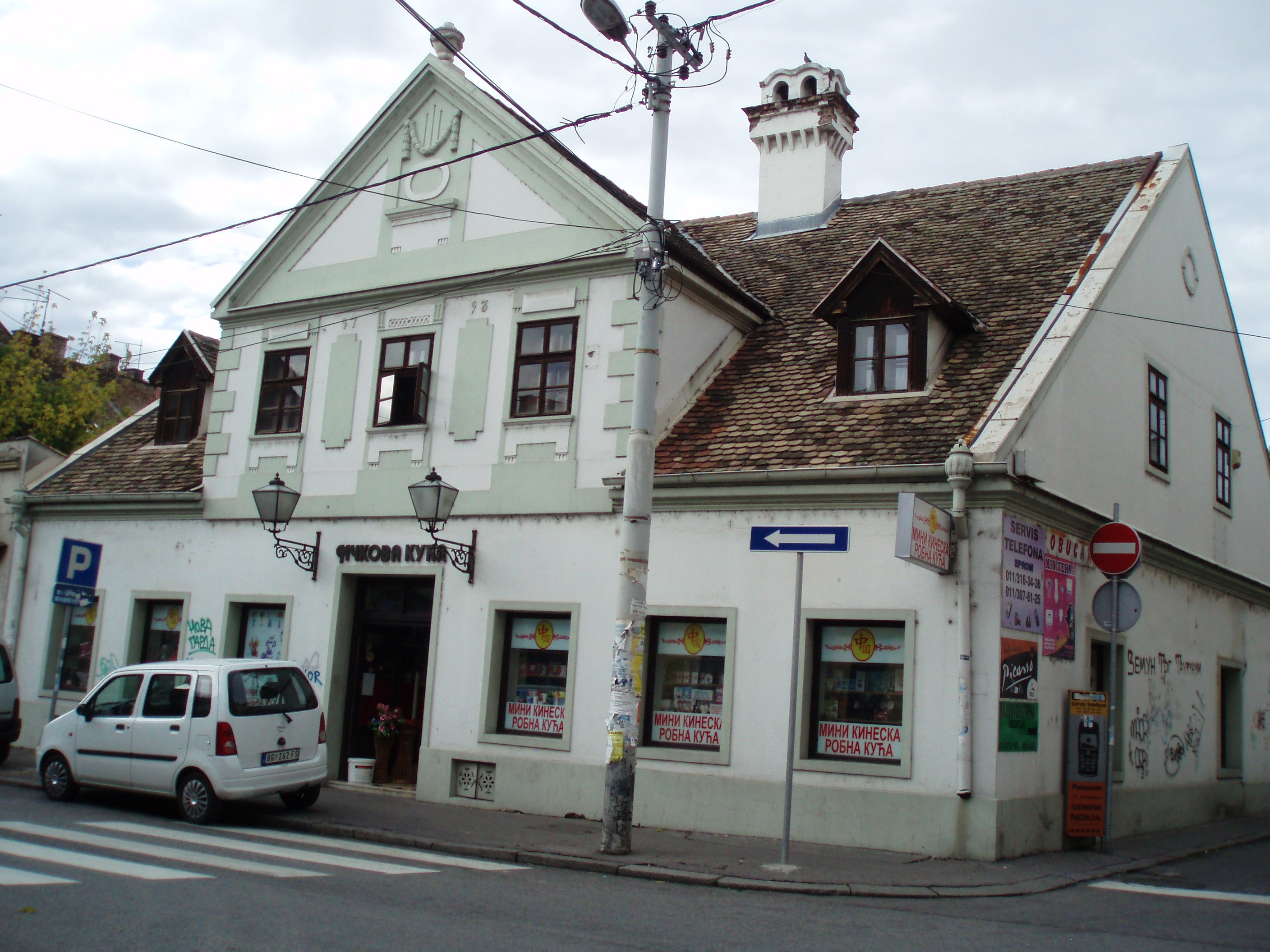
- Ičko’s House in Zemun
- Interactive map of the Ičko’s House area

General information
- Status: Cultural property of exceptional importance
- Location: Zemun-Belgrade, Serbia
- Coordinates: 44°54′47″N 20°40′53″E
- Completed: 1793

Ičko’s House is a cultural monument of importance to Belgrade and is located in Zemun, at 18 Bežanijska Street.

== Description ==
Ičko’s House is a Classical-style building, built in 1793. It consists of a basement, ground floor and partial second floor formed by a high gable roof with dormers. The tavern Marko Kraljević was on the ground floor, while the first floor was used for housing. The building is one of the oldest preserved houses, and is representative of a town house at the end of the eighteenth century.

The building is known as Ičko’s House because the rebel diplomat and trader Petar Ičko stayed in it from 1802–1803 when he had to leave Belgrade after the return to power of the Dahije. Ičko played a role in the First Serbian Uprising in 1804, working with the Serbian rebels.

== Gallery ==
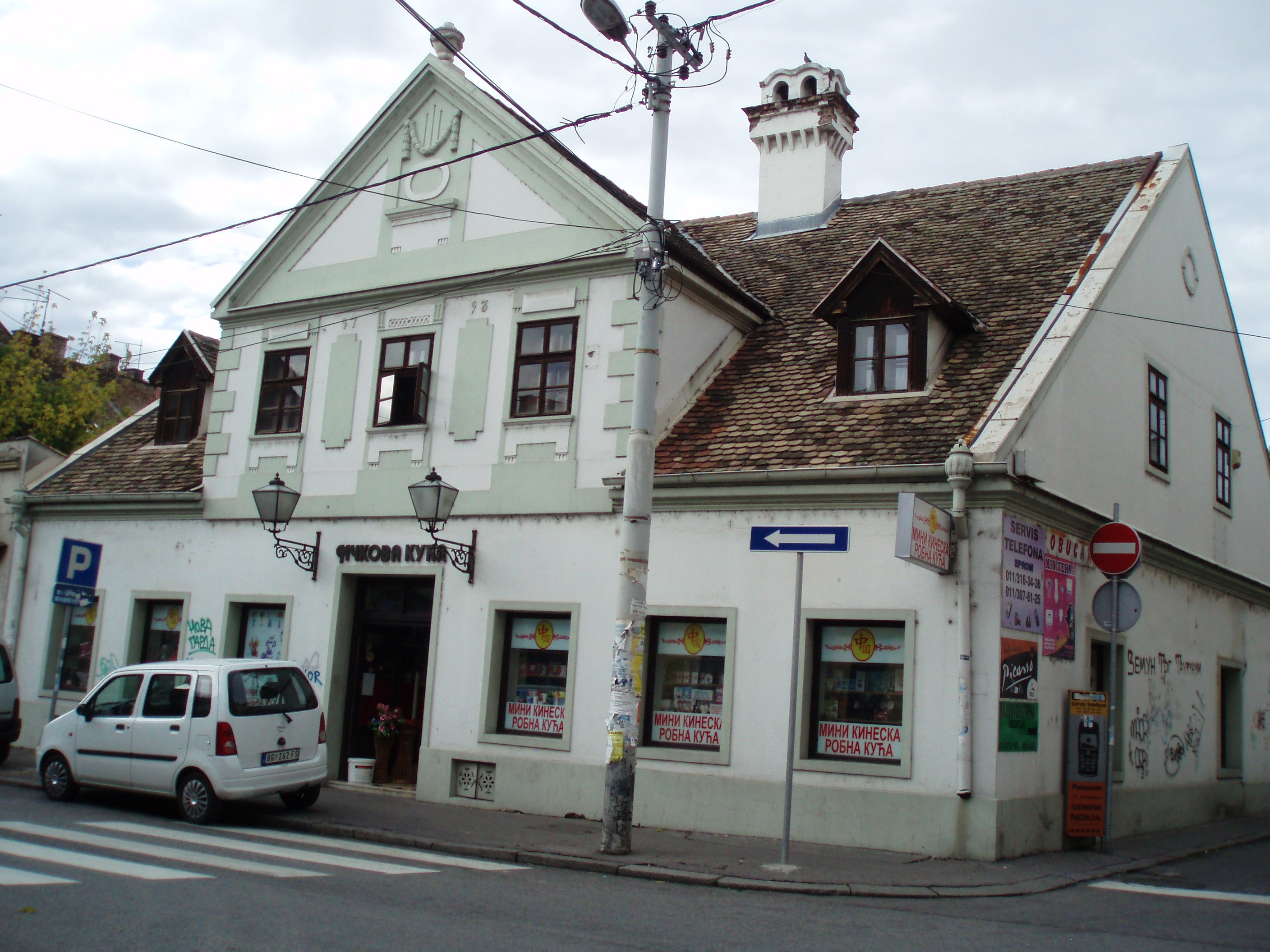
Appearance from Bežanijska Street

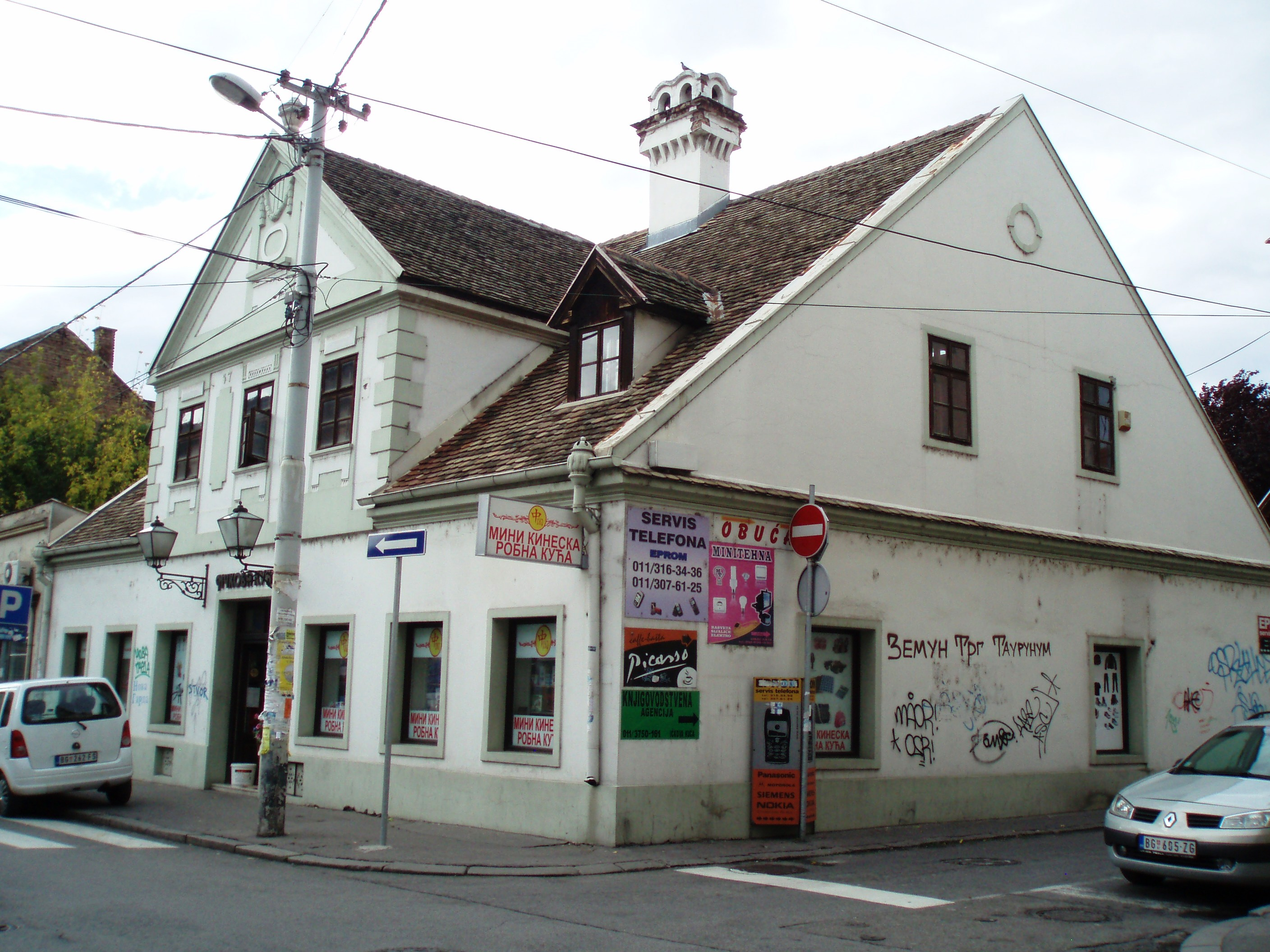
Corner of Bežanijska and Svetosavska Street

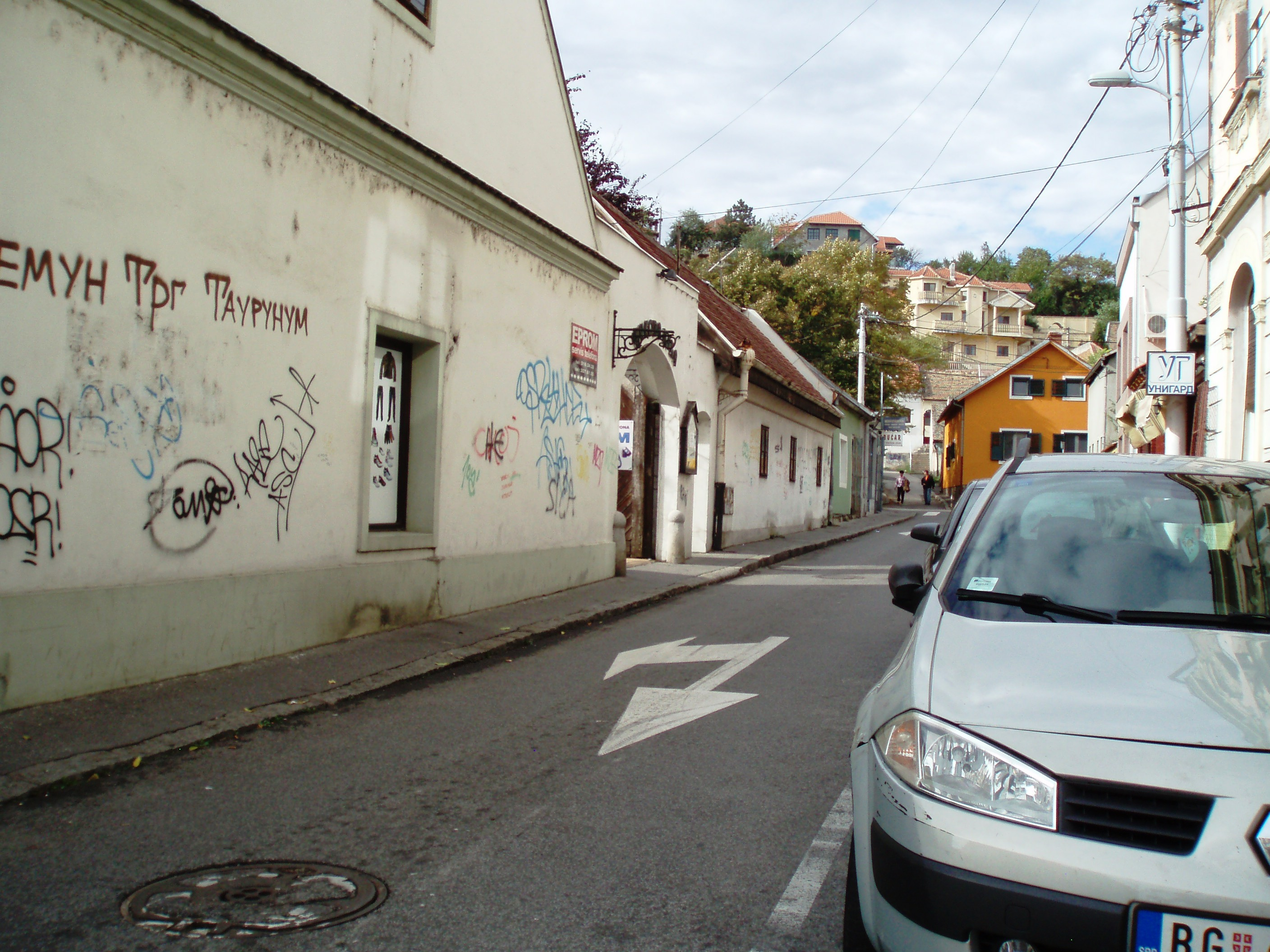
Appearance from Svetosavska Street

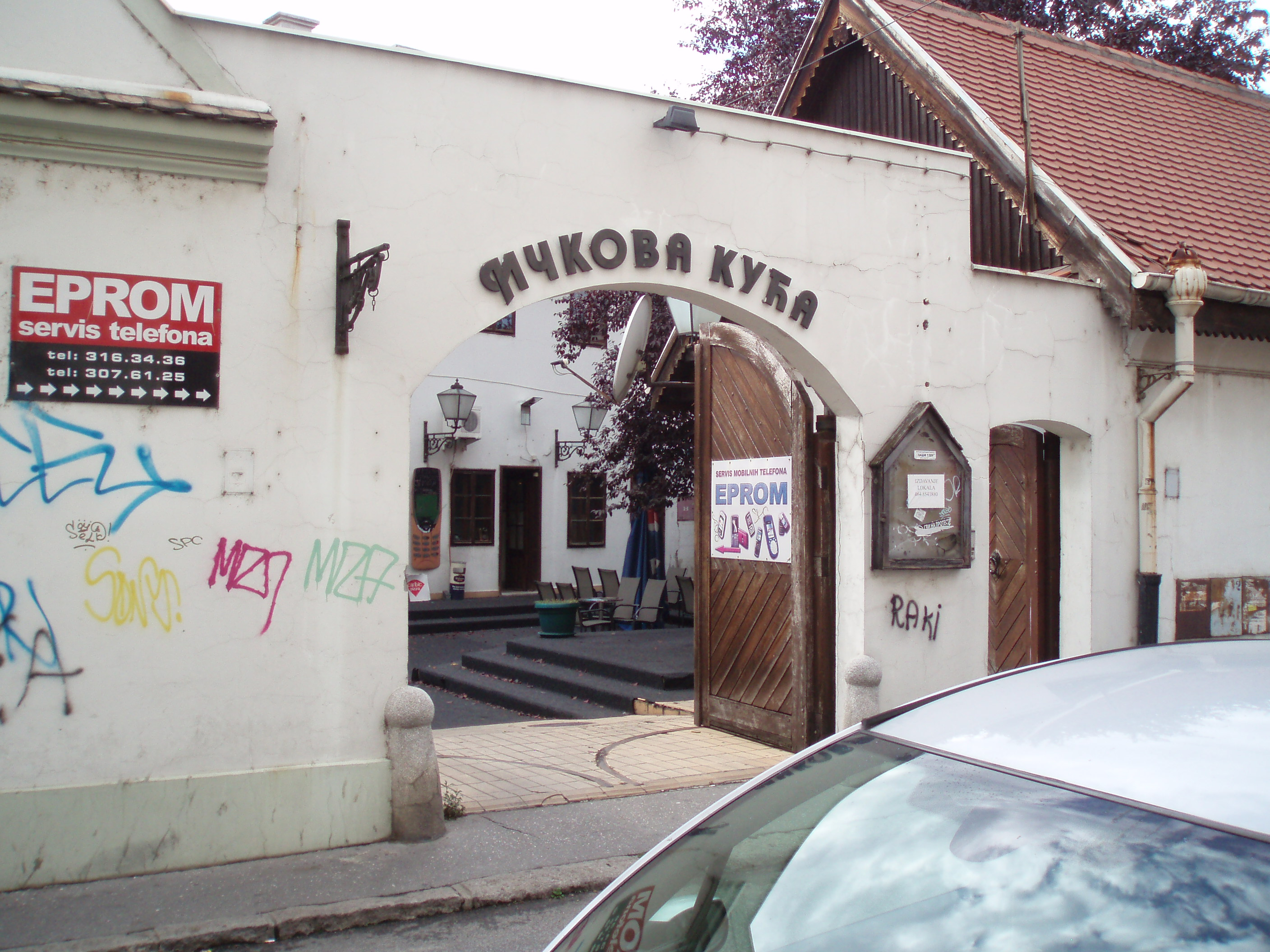
Detail of the entrance gate

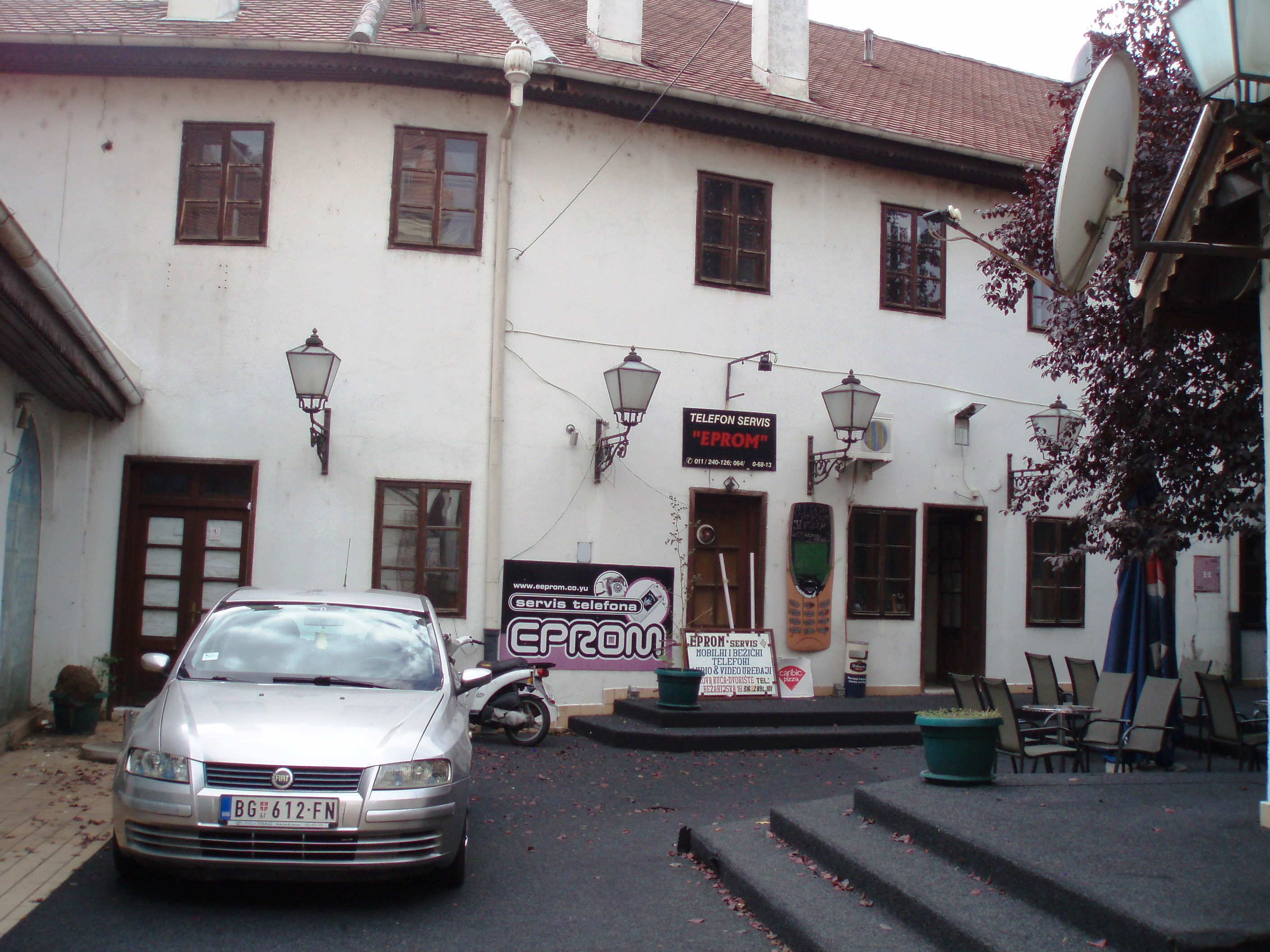
Yard

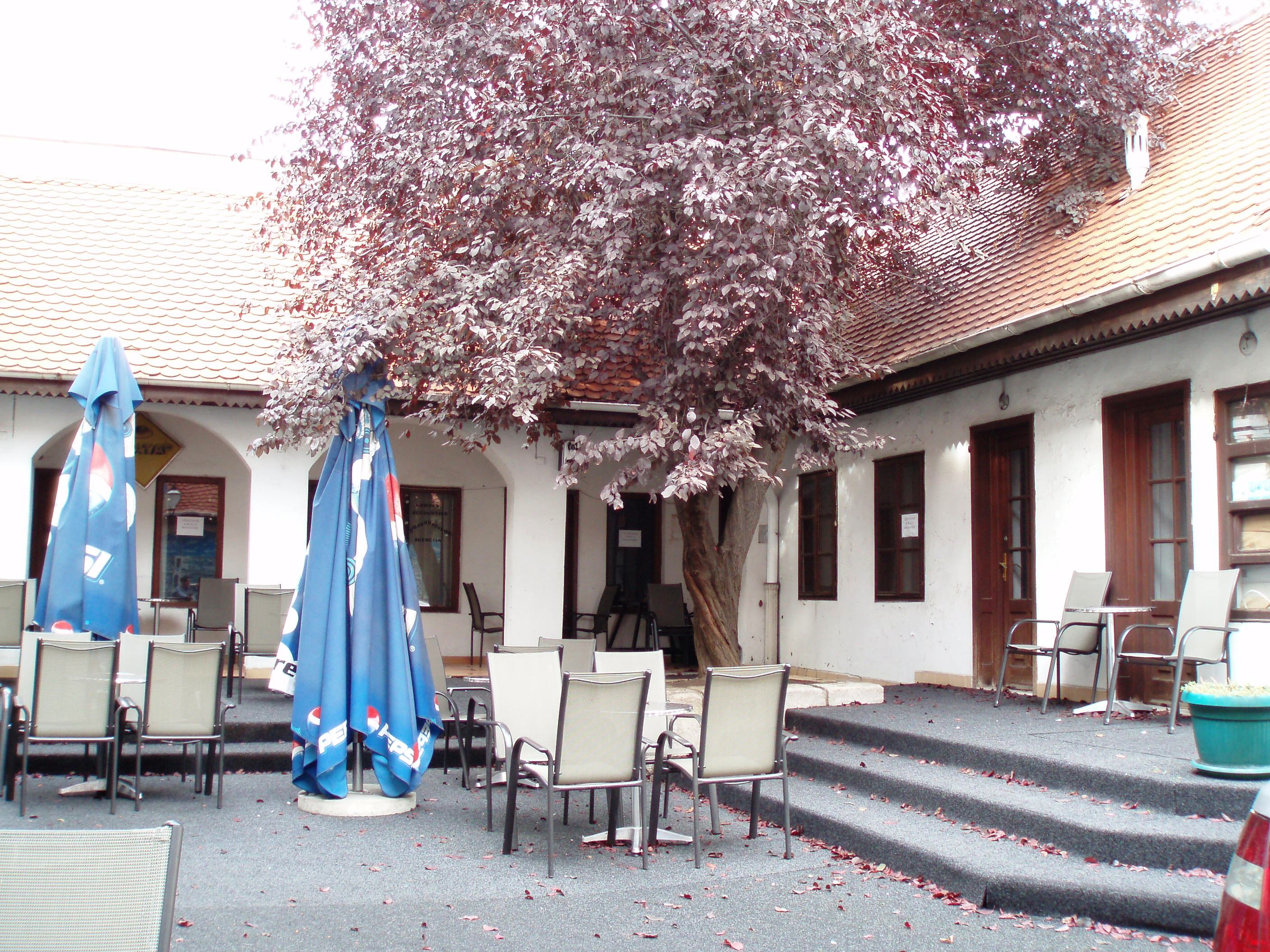
Yard

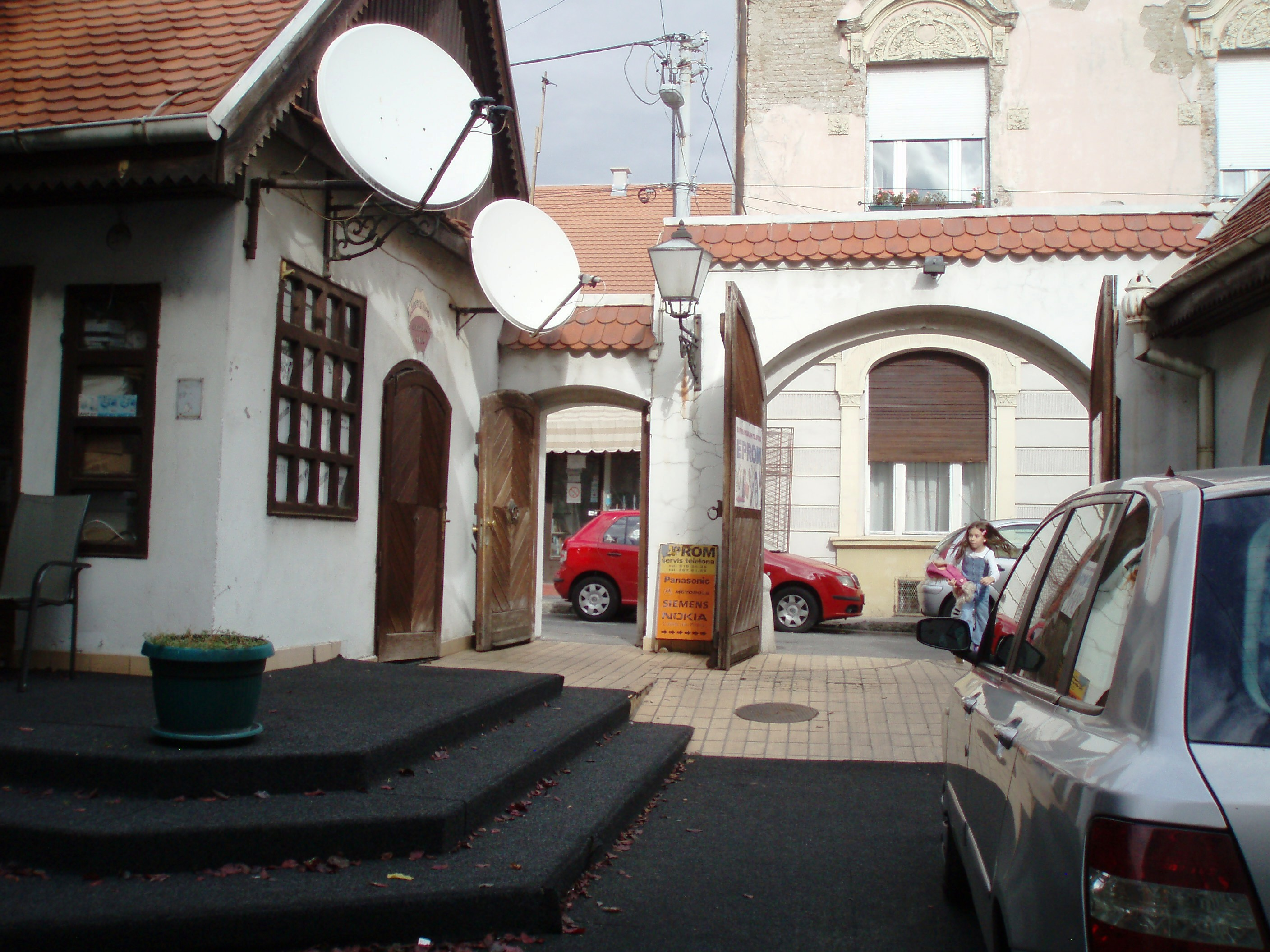
Yard

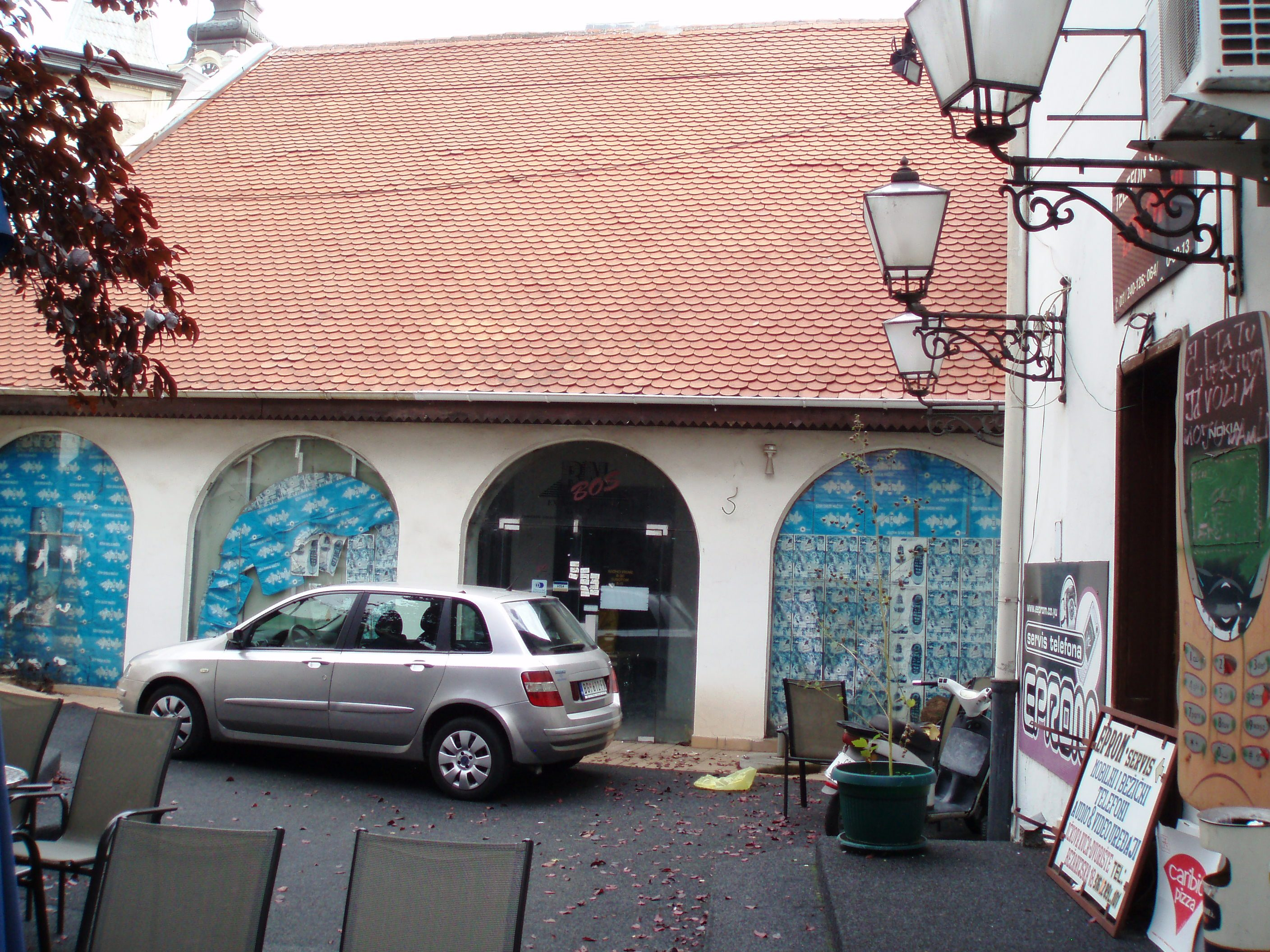
Yard
