= Milan Bogićević =

Serbian politician and diplomat

- Милан Богићевић
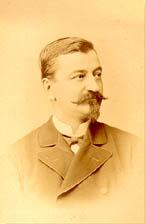
- Born: 6 March 1840; Šabac, Principality of Serbia
- Died: 22 June 1929 (aged 89); Vienna, Austrian Empire
- Occupation: politician

Milan Bogićević (Serbian Cyrillic: Милан Богићевић; 6 March 1840 – 22 June 1929), was a Serbian politician and diplomat. He served as Minister of Justice, Minister of Foreign Affairs and ambassador to Ottoman Empire, Austria-Hungary and German Empire.

== Biography ==
Born in Šabac, Milan was the son of Miloš Bogićević, the chief of Šabac district and later president of the Belgrade municipality, and Anđelija (née Lukačević). His grandfather was Anta Bogićević, a vojvode. His brothers were Antonije and Mihailo Bogićević.

He graduated in law and began his diplomatic career as secretary of the Serbian Legation in Constantinople in 1868, which he interrupted in 1872 by becoming secretary to Prince Milan I.

He returned to the diplomatic service, as an envoy to Vienna and Berlin, on several occasions. Milan served as the Minister of Justice from 1874 to 1975 and as the Minister of Foreign Affairs for three terms (1875, 1883–84 and 1894–95). Although more of a civil servant than a politician, he was considered a defender of the course of leaning Serbian foreign policy towards Austria-Hungary and was a pronounced anti-radical.

Milan was married to Perka, daughter of politician Mihailo Barlovac. They had a son, Miloš Bogićević, who would later become a doctor of law. Milan died in Vienna and was buried at the New Cemetery in Belgrade.

Government offices
Preceded by Milan Piroćanac	Minister of Foreign Affairs; 1875	Succeeded by Jovan Ristić
Preceded by Milan Piroćanac	Minister of Foreign Affairs; 1883–1884	Succeeded by Milutin Garašanin
Preceded by Sima Lozanić	Minister of Foreign Affairs; 1894–1895	Succeeded by Stojan Novaković
