= Andra Nikolić =

Serbian politician (1853–1918)

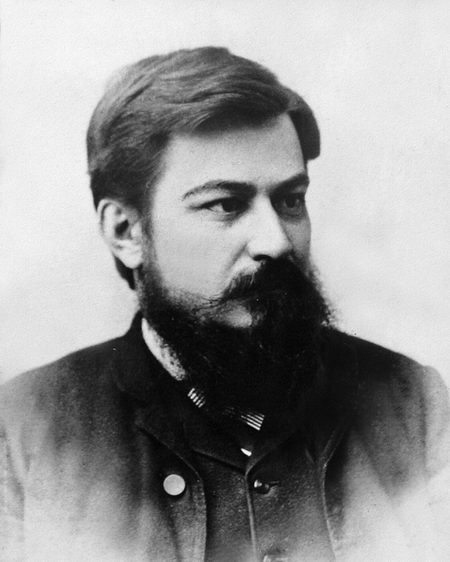
- Andra Nikolić as Serbian academic
- Born: 5 October 1853; Belgrade, Principality of Serbia
- Died: 28 September 1918 (aged 64); Paris, France
- Occupations: politician, writer, jurist

Andra Nikolić (Belgrade, 5 October 1853 — Paris, 28 September 1918) was a Serbian politician, jurist, writer, literary historian and academic.

== Biography ==
His parents were Josif Nikolić, a municipal clerk, and Natalija Marković (maiden name) the sister of politician Stefan Marković. Andra was brought up in a typical Serbian, late 19th-century middle-class environment. After completing his gymnasium, he studied law at the Velika škola in Belgrade where he graduated in 1873. His first published work "The Economic State of Serbia in 14th-Century" brought him immediate recognition and fame.

After entering the civil service, he formed an alliance with Stojan Protić and Lazar Paču and the trio became one of the closest political associates and personal colleagues in the Serbian government. The other leaders consisted of Nikola Pašić, Alexander (Aca) Stanojević, and Lazar Paču.

Nikolić continued to keep good relations with a group of young Radicals who left the party to found their own Independent Radical Party in 1901, but he did not join them.

Andra Nikolić served in several governments (Sava Grujić, Nikola Pašić (13 May 1890 - 21 August 1892), Lazar Dokić (13 April - 5 December 1893), Đorđe Simić (29 December 1896 - 23 October 1897), Nikola Pasić (10 December 1904 - 29 May 1905), Nikola Pašić and Petar Velimirović (30 April 1906 - 24 February 1909), subsequently acting many times over as Minister of Education, Minister of Foreign Affairs (from 1 April 1893 until 4 June 1893; from 4 June 1893 until 23 November 1893; and from 21 September 1903 until 26 January 1904), Speaker of the National Assembly and the head of the diplomatic mission in Paris. As Minister of Education, he passed a law on 27 February 1905 making his alma mater the University of Belgrade.

Nikolić was one of the cosigners of the Treaty of London, which ended the Second Balkan War in 1913.

Andra Nikolić is remembered as the voice of reason and common sense in the Radical Main Committee since 1881.

He died in Paris on 28 September 1918. His remains were eventually transferred to Serbia in 1926.

== Works ==
Nikolić was not only concerned with law and politics but in literature as well. He began to write aesthetic literary and theatrical reviews early in his career. His literary works were published in literary journals, Otadžbina (Fatherland), Rad (Opus), Delo (The Act), Odjek (Echo), Samouprava (Self-Government) and many other such periodicals and magazines. In the journal Otadžbina, he edited a section called "Literary Review" from 1875 until 1881. He further distinguished himself by his literary works as an excellent expert in the Serbian language, it was no wonder that he was elected professor of History of Serbian Literature at the Velika škola in 1880, but declined the offer to remain in politics. He was a literary critic of great talent, fine observation, and great style even when he reviewed the work of his fellow politicians. He collaborated with Stojan Novaković and together published some editions of syntax books, and translations of the works by Taras Shevchenko. Nikolić also translated George Eliot's The Mill on the Floss (1860) into Serbian under the title Vodenica na flossi in 1893.

Government offices
Preceded by Mihailo V. Vujić	Minister of Education of Serbia; 1890–1892	Succeeded by Jovan Bošković
Preceded by Aron Ninčić	Minister of Education of Serbia; 1896–1897	Succeeded by Andra Đorđević
Preceded by Ljubomir Davidović	Minister of Education of Serbia; 1904–1905	Succeeded by Jovan Žujović
Preceded by Ljubomir Stojanović	Minister of Education of Serbia; 1906–1909	Succeeded by Ljubomir Stojanović
Preceded by Jovan Avakumović	Minister of Foreign Affairs of Serbia; 1893	Succeeded by Sava Grujić
Preceded by Ljubomir Kaljević	Minister of Foreign Affairs of Serbia; 1903–1904	Succeeded by Nikola Pašić
