= Stojan Novaković =

Serbian politician and historian (1842–1915)

Stojan Novaković Стојан Новаковић
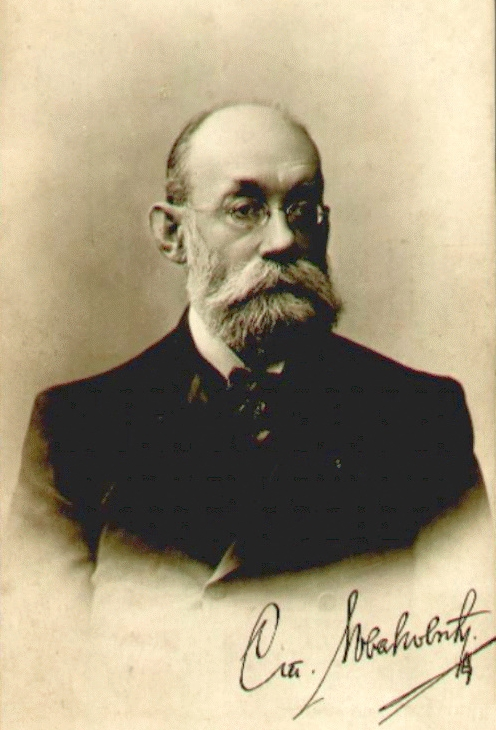

38th Prime Minister of Serbia
- In office 1895–1896
- Monarch: Alexander I
- Preceded by: Nikola Hristić
- Succeeded by: Đorđe Simić
- In office February 1909 – October 1909
- Monarch: Peter I
- Preceded by: Petar Velimirović
- Succeeded by: Nikola Pašić

Personal details
- Born: Kosta Novaković; 13 November 1842 Šabac, Principality of Serbia
- Died: 17 February 1915 (aged 72) Niš, Kingdom of Serbia
- Resting place: Belgrade New Cemetery
- Party: Progressive Party
- Occupation: historian, philologist, politician and diplomat
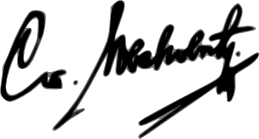
- Signature

Stojan Novaković (Serbian Cyrillic: Стојан Новаковић; 13 November 1842 – 17 February 1915) was a Serbian politician, historian, diplomat, writer, bibliographer, literary critic, literary historian, and translator. He held the post of Prime Minister of the Kingdom of Serbia on two occasions, post of minister of education on three occasions, minister of interior on one occasion and leading the foremost liberal political party of that time in Serbia, the Progressive Party. He was also one of the most successful and skilled Serbian diplomats, holding the post of envoy to Constantinople, Paris, Vienna and Saint Petersburg.

Noted intellectual, Stojan Novaković was the president of the Serbian Academy of Sciences and Arts, head of the National Library the first president and a founding member of Serbian Literary Guild, Professor at the Belgrade's Velika škola, member of Serbian, Yugoslav, French, Czech, Polish and Russian academies. Stojan Novaković is considered one of the foremost Serbian historians of the nineteenth century and one of the founders of modern Serbian historiography.

== Scholarly career ==
Novaković was the first Serbian-educated scholar of the 19th century that obtained international renown. After finishing his secondary education in Belgrade (1860), he studied law and philosophy until 1863 at the Belgrade Lyceum (Licej) that was eventually transformed into the Belgrade's Velika škola. In 1865 he became a professor in this Belgrade institution of higher learning. By 1872 he was the librarian of the National Library and curator of the National Museum in Belgrade.

As a young scholar, he was founder and editor of the journal Vila (Fairy Lady) that was published from 1865 to 1868. In the early years of his scholarly engagement, Novaković translated into Serbian Leopold von Ranke's monumental work Die Serbische Revolution, as well as its revised and updated edition (1864–1892) as well as the equally famous Histoire de Charles XII by Voltaire (1897) and Joseph Scherr, General History of Literature from German (1872–1874). An admirer of Adam Mickiewicz, Novaković translated into Serbian his famous poem Grażyna in 1886 and the famous poem "The Captive of the Caucasus" by Alexander Pushkin. Stojan Novaković was one of the founders and first president of the Serbian Literary Cooperative in 1892, a prestigious publishing house for the most important literary and historical works.

He was strongly influenced by internationally renowned professors of Slavic philology and literature, in particular by Pavel Jozef Šafárik, who was living and working in Serbia at the time, and Đura Daničić, the translator of the Bible into the vernacular. Under the influence of Daničić, Novaković wrote "The History of Serbian Literature," (Istorija srpske književnosti) in 1867 (revised in 1871), and compiled also the first "Serbian Bibliography" (Srpska bibliografija za noviju književnost, 1741–1867) in 1869, published by the Serbian Learned Society, which resulted in him becoming a corresponding member of the Yugoslav Academy in Zagreb in 1870. He prepared simplified, but complete manuals for Serbian grammar that were widely published and used in various schools.

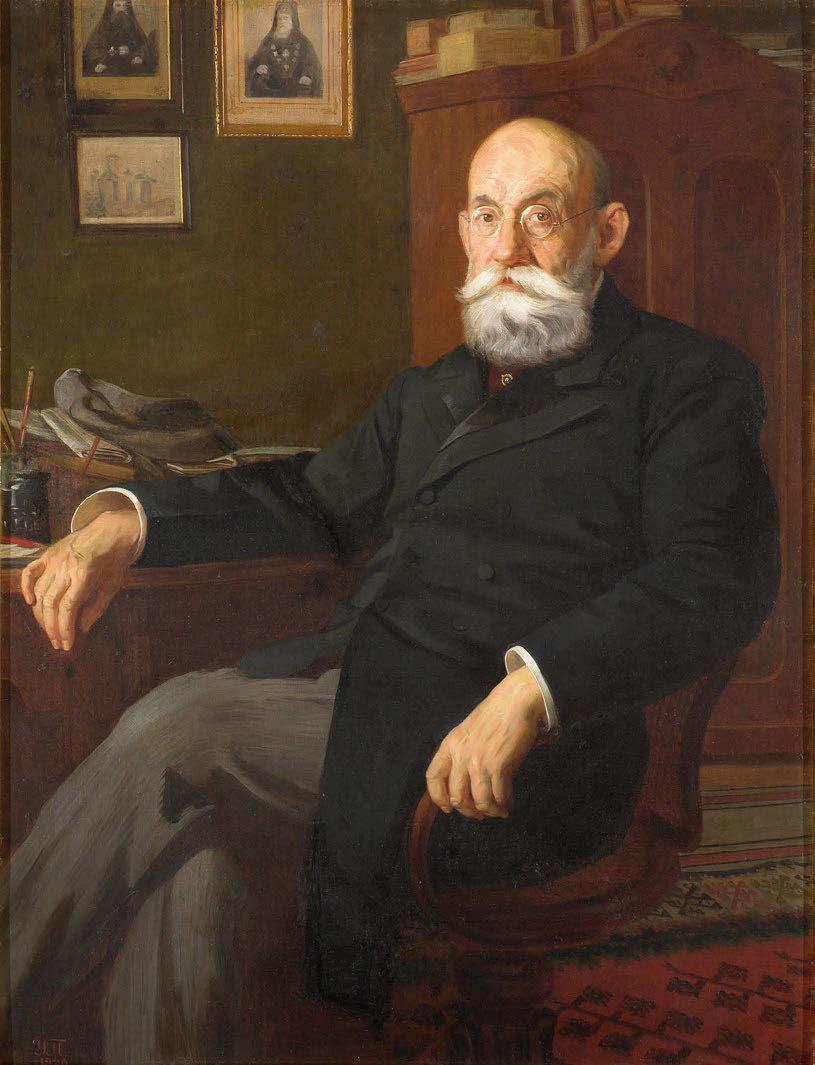
A portrait of Novaković by Uroš Predić

In 1865 Novaković was elected member of Serbian Learned Society in Belgrade, the precursor of the Serbian Royal Academy (Serbian: Srpska kraljevska akademija), officially founded in 1886. When the Serbian Royal Academy was founded Novaković was made one of its 16 initial members, while in 1906 he became President of the Academy, a position he held until his death in 1915. It was at the initiative of Novaković that the Serbian Royal Academy started comprehensive research and collection of various materials available throughout the Serb-inhabited Balkans, which realized the Dictionary of Serbo-Croatian Literary and Vernacular Language. Although a disciple of Đura Daničić, who was concentrated primarily on linguistic issues, Novaković managed to expand the field of research, establishing a multi-disciplinary approach in treating all the social sciences related to national history, culture and tradition.

The early works of Novaković were mainly on poetry and literature, including his own early poetry (Pevanija, 1862) and attracted minor interest, as did his early novels (Nesrećni andjelak, Kob, Lepa Nerećanka, Vampir, Kaludjer) written between 1862 and 1865. Novaković was the Serbian counterpart to the prominent Slavist scholars, philologists such as Czech Dobrovský or Šafárik among Slovaks, Jernej (Bartholomeus) Kopitar and Franz Miklosich among Slovenians, and Vatroslav Jagić among Croats.

A scholar of Renaissance knowledge and interest, Novaković was able to use sources published in a dozen Slavic languages, as well as the growing literature in French, English, and German. After learning Latin and Greek, Novaković, already established as a promising scholar in Slavic literature and linguistics, was able to use medieval sources for his extensive historical research on medieval Serbia and the Balkans.

His first major study on historic geography, published in 1877, covered the reign of Stefan Nemanja (Zemljište radnje Nemanjine). His major work on medieval Serbia, the monograph on late Nemanjić period (Serbs and Turks in 14th and 15th centuries), was published in 1893, while his other important works based on unused documents including the studies of pronoia (Pronijari i baštinici) from 1887, village life in the medieval epoch (Selo), a comprehensive social and historical study, from 1891, and The Old Serbian Army (Stara srpska vojska), from 1893, as well as a study on medieval Serbian capitals in Rascia and Kosovo (Nemanjićke prestonice: Ras, Pauni, Nerodimlje), published in 1911, were considered as chapters of the comprehensive, multi-volume monograph The People and the Land in the Old Serbian State (Zemlja i narod u staroj srpskoj državi) which was never fully completed.

The comprehensive volume of medieval documents under the title Legal Documents of Serbian Medieval States (Zakonski spomenici srpskih država srednjeg veka), from 1912, still stands as the main source on the subject for medieval Serbia (Rascia), Bosnia, and Dioclea (Zeta). Another major volume is a scholarly edition of the Serbian Emperor Stefan Dušan's Code (Zakonik Stefana Dušana cara srpskog), based on the manuscript found in Prizren, and a work on the Byzantine legal sources of Serbian medieval law (Matije Vlastara Sintagmat), a subject he treated on several occasions.

His other studies, also based on primary sources and available literature in various languages, covered the modern period, prior and during the Serbian revolution (1804–1835): The Ottoman Empire prior to the Serbian Insurrection, 1780-1804 (Tursko carstvo pred srpski ustanak 1780-1804), The Resurrection of Serbia (Vaskrs države srpske) in 1904 (translated into German and published in Sarajevo in 1912), as well as the detailed analysis of first phase of Serbian Revolution (Ustanak na dahije 1804). In 1907, equally important was the analysis of the struggle between “supreme and central government” in insurgent Serbia: The Constitutional Question and the Law under Karageorge (Ustavno pitanje i zakon Karadjordjeva vremena).

Apart from scholarly work, Novaković published political analysis mostly under the pseudonym "Šarplaninac". These studies on contemporary politics, ethnographic questions, religious strife and national propaganda of various Balkan states, were published as a collection of papers under the title Balkan Questions (Balkanska pitanja) in 1906. In addition to political works, Novaković published several travelogues, on Constantinople (Pod zidinama Carigrada), Bursa (Brusa) and Turkey-in-Europe (S Morave na Vardar).

== Political career ==
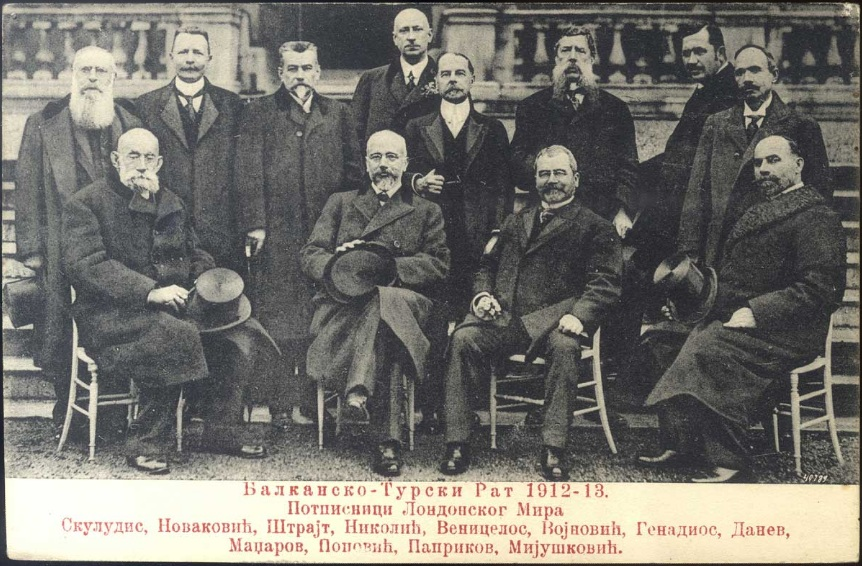
Novaković (the first man sitting on the left) representing Serbia at London Conference of 1912–13

Novaković became the Minister of Education and Religious Affairs in Jovan Ristić’s Liberal cabinet in April 1873 and started to prepare the Law on high schools in Serbia. In October 1873 he became anew the Librarian, and in November 1874 again the Minister of Education in the Cabinet of Aćim Čumić and in 1875 was offered the same ministerial post at the government of Prime Minister Danilo Stefanović. He became a professor at the Belgrade's Velika škola in 1875, while from 1880 to 1883 he was, for the third time, the minister of education in the Milan Piroćanac conservative Progressive government, when he managed to regulate the status and legal position of both primary and secondary schools. Stojan Novaković, a kind of Serbian Jules Ferry, introduced compulsory primary education for Serbian children, and prepared and made passed dozens of important, often French-inspired bills into laws in the National Assembly. Being an early member of the group of Western-oriented intellectuals that formed the Progressive Party (Napredna stranka) in 1880, soon to be a pillar of King Milan Obrenović's Austrophile and Turkophile policy, Novaković was, as other Progressives led by Milan Piroćanac and Milutin Garašanin, in favour of enlightened Western-inspired reforms that were to be introduced to the predominantly peasant society of Serbia. In 1883, Novaković became a member of the State Council (Državni Savet), only to be reassigned shortly as Minister of Interior 1884 in Milutin Garašanin's government. He soon stepped down after judging that Garašanin was making too many concessions to King Milan Obrenović, before eventually returning to a more stable State Council.

Novaković eventually entered into Serbian diplomacy in 1885. He was sent as the Serbian envoy to Constantinople, considered, along with Vienna and St. Petersburg, as one of the most important posts in that period. The diplomatic convention with Ottoman Turkey signed in 1886, due to Novaković's skillful negotiations, made possible the opening of Serbian consulates in Skopje, and Thessaloniki. Novaković stayed as Serbian envoy to Constantinople for almost seven years, until 1892. He was instrumental in organizing a huge network of Serbian consulates, secular and religious Serbian schools and Serb religious institutions throughout Turkey-in-Europe, in particular in Kosovo, Metohija and Macedonia between Skopje and Monastir (Bitolj, Bitola). Furthermore, Novaković initiated the establishment of closer Serbian-Greek cooperation, both with the government in Athens and the Patriarchate of Constantinople.He became the first politician to decide to use the marginal, the nascent and ideologically unformed at this time Macedonian nationalism as an ideology, in order to oppose the strong Bulgarian positions in Macedonia and as a transitional stage towards the complete Serbization of the Slavic population in Macedonia, and even became the creator of the pejorative expression "Macedonism".

As President of State Council, 1892–1895, Novaković was a member of a foreign policy committee that was instrumental to the flourishing of Serbian schools in the Ottoman Empire, as well as to the restoration of the vacant bishopric seat in Prizren in Old Serbia (the Vilayet of Kosovo) to a Serbian Metropolitan.

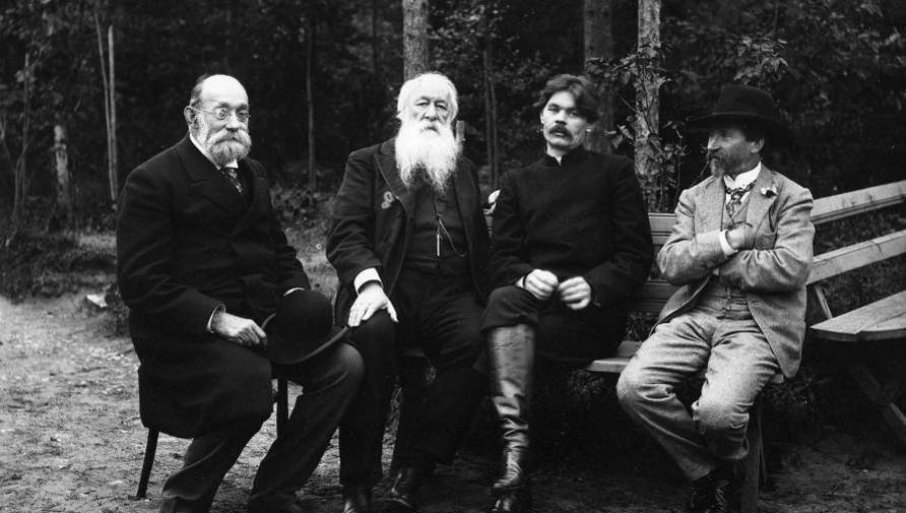
Novaković with Maxim Gorky, Vladimir Stasov and Ilya Repin, 1909.

As the Prime Minister under King Aleksandar Obrenović (1895–1896), Novaković managed to convert the state debt, and avoid the financial collapse of Serbia. In order to obtain efficient protection of persecuted Christian Serbs in Ottoman Turkey, Novaković sided with Russia, laying the ground for further political gains in that area. After resigning from the government, Novaković, in October 1897, retired from leadership in the Progressive Party.

Appointed anew as Serbian envoy to Constantinople (1897–1900), Novaković organized the first diplomatic action in order to protect Christian Serbs in the vilayet of Kosovo (Old Serbia), that were being persecuted by Muslim Albanian outlaws. Lacking Russian support, this action, additionally suppressed by Austria-Hungary, did not bring tangible results but raised awareness of both the Serbian and European public of the difficult conditions of the Serbs living under Turkish rule. The correspondence of Novaković with the Ottoman Foreign Minister was published in a bilingual French-Serbian “blue book”, Documents diplomatiques. Correspondance concernant les actes de violence et de brigandage des Albanais dans la Vieille Serbie (Vilayet de Kosovo) 1989-1889 (Ministère des Affaires Etrangères, Belgrade 1899). After a brief appointment to Paris in 1900, Novaković was reassigned to St. Petersburg, where he remained to be the envoy of Kingdom of Serbia until 1904.

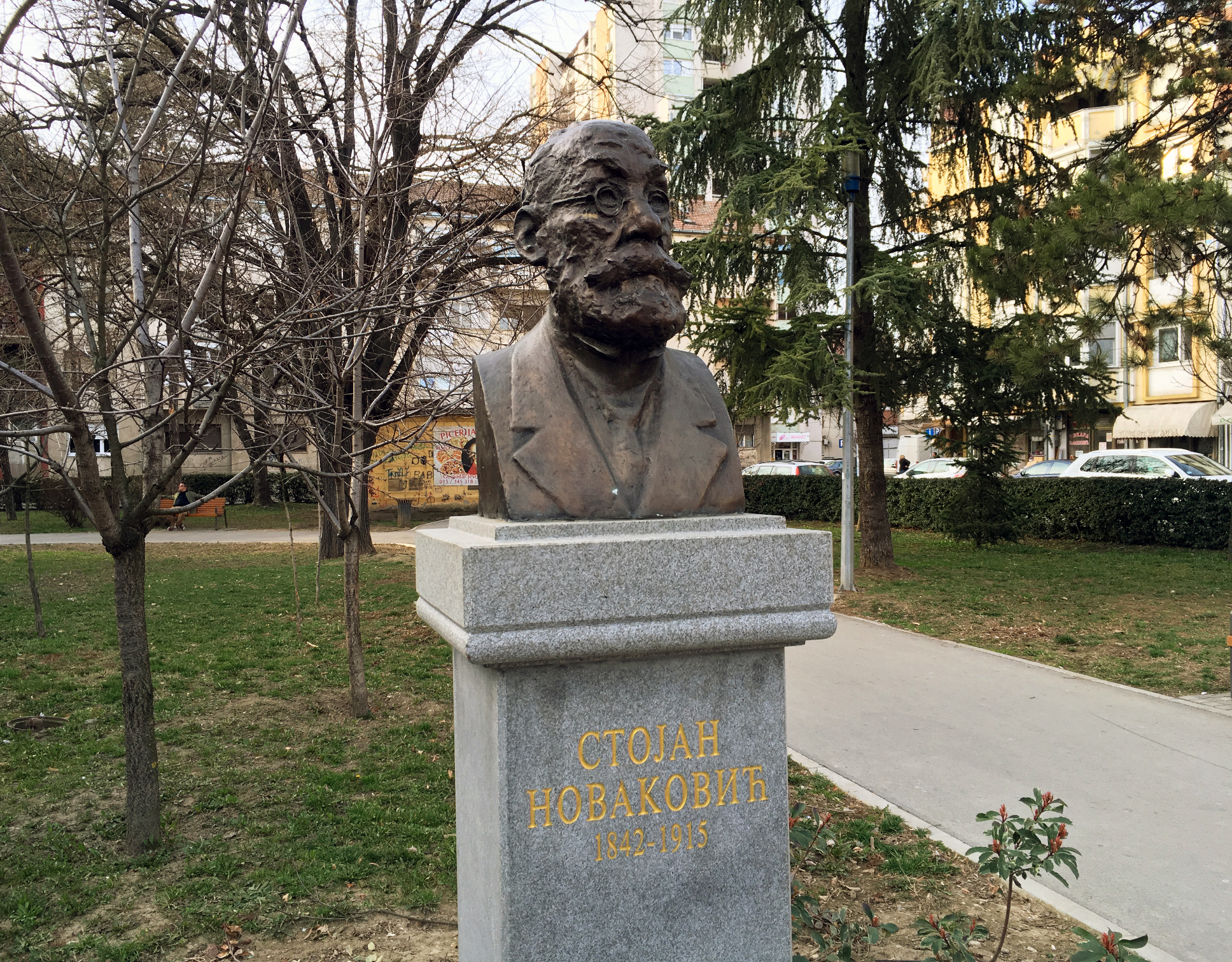
Bust of Novaković in his hometown Šabac

He retired in 1905. Nevertheless, as the most senior of Serbian statesmen, Novaković was appointed Prime Minister of the all-party government (1908–1909) during the Bosnian crisis provoked by the annexation of Bosnia & Herzegovina by Austria-Hungary, considered both as a violation of the Treaty of Berlin of 1878 and of legitimate Serbian interests. Novaković got no tangible results in his mission to Constantinople in order to persuade the Young Turk government to oppose the annexation of Bosnia. After being abandoned by both Russia and France in the annexation crisis, Serbia was obliged to formally accept the fait accompli imposed by Vienna in March 1909. His last, highly successful diplomatic mission as the first delegate was as the head of the Serbian delegation at the Conference of Ambassadors in London summoned after the Balkan Wars (1912–1913). During difficult deliberations in London, the efforts and expertise offered by Novaković proved vital in providing significant territorial gains for Serbia in Old Serbia and Macedonia at the expense of Ottoman Turkey.

After retirement in 1905, Novaković published a memoir in 1912 regarding the political situation in Serbia from 1883 to 1903, covering two decades of rule of the two last Obrenović rulers, various issues regarding the Constitution (he was in favor of two chamber system), and the role of the King and the level of democracy in the then-highly politically divided society of Serbia (Dvadeset godina ustavne politike u Srbiji : 1883-1903 : istorijsko-memoarske zapiske k tome vremenu i k postanju i praktikovanju Ustava od 1888 i 1901).

A cabinet scholar, Novaković was well known for his knowledge on various sources, strict methodological approach, dispassionate analysis, as well as patriotic interest in discovering unknown historical data on Serbian history.

== Personal life ==
Novaković was born as Kosta Novaković but changed his first name to Stojan. One of his close friends and correspondents was sociology pioneer and jurist Valtazar Bogišić. He was married to Jelena Kujundžić, sister of Milan Kujundžić Aberdar.

== Legacy ==
He is included in The 100 most prominent Serbs list. Novaković received a number of orders and decoration both in Serbia and abroad.

Historian Radovan Samardžić called him "a great polyhistor" and noticed Novaković's importance on the development of Serbian historiography and his influence on the work of dr Vladimir Ćorović.

== Selected works ==
Novaković authored more than 400 works and 50 books.

- Srpska biblijografija za noviju književnost, 1741-1867, U Biogradu : Srpsko učeno društvo, 1869, XXIV+644 pp.
- Istorija srpske književnosti : pregled ugađan za školsku potrebu : s jednim litografisanim snimkom, Drugo sasvim prerađeno izdanje, Beograd : izdanje i štampa Državne štamparije, 1871, XII+332 pp.
- Kosovo : srpske narodne pjesme o boju na Kosovu : pokušaj da se sastave u cjelinu kao spjev, U Biogradu : u Državnoj štampariji, 1871, 40 pp.
- Primeri književnosti i jezika staroga i srpsko-slovenskoga, Beograd, Izdanje i štampa Državne štamparije, 1877, XXVII+593 pp.
- Zemljište radnje Nemanjine, Beograd: u Državnoj štampariji, 1877, 83 pp.
- Die serbischen Volkslieder über die Kosovo-Schlacht (1389): Eine kritische Studie 1879, pp. 413–462
- Heraldički običaji u Srba : u primeni i Književnosti, Beograd, Kraljevsko-srpska državna štamparija, 1884, 140 pp.
- Beleške o Đ. Daničiću : prilog k istoriji srpske književnosti, U Beogradu, u Kraljevsko-srpskoj Državnoj štampariji, 1885, 100 pp.
- Pronijari i baštinici : (spahije i čitluk-sahibije) : prilog k istoriji nepokretne imovine u Srbiji XIII-XIX veka : jedna glava iz prostranijeg dela "Narod i zemlja u staroj srpskoj državi", Beograd, Kraljevsko-srpska državna štamparija, 1887, 102 pp. (Glas, Srpska kraljevska akademija, vol. 1)
- Srpska Kraljevska Akademija i negovanje jezika srpskog : poslanica Akademiji nauka filosofskih, pročitana na svečanom skupu akademije, držanom 10 septembra 1888 u slavu stogodišnjice Vuka Stef.Karadžića, Beograd, Kraljevsko-srpska državna štamparija, 1888, 87 pp. (Glas, Srpska Kraljevska Akademija, vol. 10)
- Manastir Banjska : zadužbina Kralja Milutina u srpskoj istoriji, Beograd, Državna štamparija Kraljevine Srbije, 1892, 55 pp. (Glas, Srpska Kraljevska Akademija, vol. 32)
- S Morave na Vardar : 1886, Beograd, Kraljevska srpska državna štamparija, 1892, 76 pp.
- Srpska gramatika, 1. celokupno izd., Beograd, izdanje i štampa Državne štamparije, 1894, XXII+512 pp.
- Stara srpska vojska : istorijske skice iz dela "Narod i zemlja u staroj srpskoj državi", Beograd, Kraljevsko-srpska državna štamparija, 1893, 207 pp.
- Strumska oblast u XIV veku i car Stefan Dušan, Beograd, Kralj.-srp. državna štamparija,1893, 49 pp. (Glas, Srpska kraljevska akademija, vol. 36)
- Zakonik Stefana Dušana cara srpskog : 1349 i 1354, Beograd, Državna štamparija, 1898, CLIII+ 312 pp. (Izdanje Zadužbine Ilije M. Kolarca; vol. 91)
- Srpska knjiga : njeni prodavci i čitaoci u XIX veku, Beograd : Državna štamparija Kraljevine Srbije, 1900, IV+118 pp.
- Ustanak na dahije 1804 : ocena izvora, karakter ustanka, vojevanje 1804 : s kartom Beogradskog pašaluka, Beograd, Zadužbina Ilije M. Kolarca,1904, VIII+208 pp.(Izdanje Zadužbine Ilije M. Kolarca; vol. 103)
- Vaskrs države srpske : političko-istorijska studija o prvom srpskom ustanku 1804-1813, 2. popunjeno i popravljeno izd. Beograd, Srpska književna zadruga, 1904, 252 pp.
- Dva dana u Skoplju : 14-15-16 jul 1905, Beograd, Državna štamparija Kraljevine Srbije, 1905, 58 pp.
- Tursko carstvo pred Srpski ustanak : 1780-1804, Beograd: Srpska književna zadruga, 1906, VIII, 429 pp.
- Balkanska pitanja i manje istorijsko-političke beleške o Balkanskom poluostrvu : 1886-1905, Beograd, Izdanje Zadužbine I. M. Kolarca,1906, VIII+ 559 pp.
- Katolička crkva u Srbiji : Pisma vladike J. J.Štrosmajera iz 1881-1885, Beograd, "Dositej Obradović" – Štamparija Ace M. Stanojevića, 1907, 55 pp.
- Ustavno pitanje i zakoni Karađorđeva vremena : studija o postanju i razviću vrhovne i središnje vlasti u Srbiji 1805.-1811. Stojana Novakovića, Beograd, Nova štamparija "Davidović", 1907 IV+131 pp.
- Jovan Sterijin Popović : 1806-1856 :književno-istorijska studija Stojana Novakovića, Beograd, Državna štamparija Kraljevine Srbije, 1907, 121 pp.
- Matije Vlastara Sintagmat : azbučni zbornik vizantijskih crkvenih i državnih zakona i pravila : slovenski prevod vremena Dušanova, Beograd, Državna štamparija Kraljevine Srbije, 1907, LXXXVII+621 pp. (Zbornik za istoriju, jezik i književnost srpskoga naroda. Prvo odeljenje, Spomenici na srpskom jeziku, knj. 4)
- Najnovija balkanska kriza i srpsko pitanje : beleške, razmišljanja, razgovori i politički članci iz 1908-1909, Beograd, Štamparija "Štampa" St. M. Ivković i Komp., 1910, 100 pp.
- Nemanjićske prestonice : Ras - Pauni - Nerodimlja, Beograd, Državna štamparija Kraljevine Srbije, 1911, 54 pp.
- Bibliografija Stojana Novakovića : 1858-1911, Beograd, Državna štamparija Kraljevine Srbije, 1911, 96 pp.
- Zakonski spomenici srpskih država srednjega veka, Knj. 5, Beograd, Srpska kraljevska akademija, 1912 XLII+912 pp. (Posebna izdanja, Srpska Kraljevska Akademija, vol. 37)
- Dvadeset godina ustavne politike u Srbiji : 1883-1903 : istorijsko-memoarske zapiske k tome vremenu i k postanju i praktikovanju Ustava od 1888 i 1901, Beograd, S. B. Cvijanović, 1912, 336 pp.
- Kaludjer i hajduk : pripovetka o poslednjim danima Srbije u XV veku, Beograd, Zadužbina I. M. Kolarca, 1913, 296 pp.
- Selo, Beograd, Srpska književna zadruga, 1965 243 pp. (Introduction and comments, Sima M. Ćirković)
- Prepiska Stojana Novakovića i Valtazara Bogišića (Correspondance entre Stojan Novaković et Valtazar Bogišić), B. M. Nedeljković (ed.), Beograd : Srpska akademija nauka i umetnosti,1968, IX + 264 pp.(Zbornik za istoriju, jezik i književnost srpskog naroda, Odeljenje 1, vol. 28)
- Istorija i tradicija : izabrani radovi, Beograd, Srpska književna zadruga, 1982 XX+478 pp. (comments by S.M. Ćirković)
- Stojan Novaković i Vladimir Karić, ed. M. Vojvodić, Beograd : Clio & Arhiv Srbije, 2003, 615 pp.
- Radovi memoarskog karaktera, Beograd, Zavod za udžbenike, 2007, XVI+500 pp. (Izabrana dela Stojana Novakovića; knj.7)
- Izabrana dela Stojana Novakovića (Selected Works of Stojan Novaković), Belgrade: Zavod za udžbenike 2001-2008, 16 vols. (Zemlje i narod u staroj srpskoj državi, Spisi iz istorijske geografije, Srbi i Turci, Tursko carstvo pred srpski ustanak, Vaskrs države srpske, Balkanska pitanja, Nacionalna pitanja i misao, vol I, Nacionalna pitanja i misao vol. II, Autobiografski spisi, Istorija srpske književnosti, Prvi osnovi slovenske književnosti, Stara srpska književnost vol. I, Stara srpska književnost vol. II, Primeri književnosti i jezika starog srpskoslovenskog, O narodnoj tradiciji i narodnoj književnosti, Srpska bibliografija).

Government offices
Preceded by Nikola Hristić	Prime Minister of Serbia; 1895–1896	Succeeded by Đorđe Simić
Preceded by Petar Velimirović	Prime Minister of Serbia; 1909	Succeeded by Nikola Pašić
Preceded by Kosta Jovanović	Minister of Education of Serbia; 1873	Succeeded by Filip Hristić
Preceded by Filip Hristić	Minister of Education of Serbia; 1874–1875	Succeeded by Alimpije Vasiljević
Preceded by Ljubomir Kaljević	Minister of Finance of Serbia; 1875	Succeeded by Čedomilj Mijatović
Preceded by Alimpije Vasiljević	Minister of Education of Serbia; 1880–1882	Succeeded by Himself, Kingdom of Serbia established
Preceded by Himself	Minister of Education of Serbia; 1882–1883	Succeeded by Đorđe R. Pantelić
Preceded by Nikola Hristić	Minister of Internal Affairs; 1884–1885	Succeeded by Dimitrije Marinković
Preceded by Milan Bogićević	Minister of Foreign Affairs of Serbia; 1895–1896	Succeeded by Đorđe Simić
Diplomatic posts
Preceded by Jevrem Grujić	Serbian ambassador to the Ottoman Empire; 1886–1891	Succeeded by Sava Grujić
Preceded by Vladan Đorđević	Serbian ambassador to the Ottoman Empire; 1897–1900	Succeeded by Čedomilj Mijatović
Preceded by Mihailo V. Vujić	Serbian ambassador to France; 1900	Succeeded by Dragomir Cv. Rajović
Preceded by Slavko Grujić	Serbian ambassador Extraordinary and Plenipotentiary to Russian Empire; 1900–1905	Succeeded by Ljubomir Hristić
Academic offices
Preceded by Sima Lozanić	President of Serbian Academy of Sciences and Arts; 1906–1915	Succeeded by Jovan Žujović
Cultural offices
Preceded by Janko Šafarik	Director of National Library of Serbia; 1869–1874	Succeeded by Jovan Bošković
Preceded by Janko Šafarik	Director of National Museum of Serbia; 1869–1874	Succeeded by Jovan Bošković
Preceded by Post established	President of Srpska književna zadruga 1892–1895	Succeeded by Ljubomir Kovačević
