= Branko Mikašinović =

Branko Mikašinović may refer to:

- Branko Mikašinović (politician) (1924–1999), Yugoslav and Serbian diplomat and politician
- Branko Mikasinovich (academic) (born 1938), Serbian American scholar of Yugoslav and Serbian literature
