= Đorđe M. Pavlović =

Serbian politician, university professor, judge and academic

- Ђорђе М. Павловић

Minister of Foreign Affairs of Serbia
- In office 1875–1876
- Monarch: Milan I of Serbia
- Prime Minister: Ljubomir Kaljević
- Preceded by: Jovan Ristić
- Succeeded by: Jovan Ristić

Personal details
- Born: 16 April 1838 Smederevo, Principality of Serbia
- Died: 9 November 1921 (aged 83) Belgrade, Kingdom of Serbs, Croats and Slovenes
- Education: University of Paris
- Occupation: Politician, judge, university professor

Đorđe M. Pavlović (Serbian: Ђорђе М. Павловић; 1838 – 1921) was a Serbian politician, university professor, judge and academic.

He graduated law at the University of Paris in 1862 and returned to the Principality of Serbia to teach law at Belgrade's Velika škola from 1864 until 1871. Pavlović was co-founded the Credit Bank of Smederevo and later served as President of Serbia's Court of Cassation and Government Minister in several terms. King Milan Obrenović awarded him the Order of the Cross of Takovo.

== Selected works ==
- Hipotekarno pravo u Kneževini Srbiji
- O obaveznostima i ugovorima uopšte
- Objašnjenje građanskog zakona o jamstvu

Government offices
| Preceded by Jovan Ristić | Minister of Foreign Affairs of Serbia; 1875–1876 | Succeeded by Jovan Ristić |
| Preceded by Dimitrije Marinković | Minister of Justice; 1885–1886 | Succeeded by Dimitrije Marinković |
| Preceded by ? | Minister of Industry; 1885–1886 | Succeeded by ? |
