= Milan Piroćanac =

Serbian politician and judge

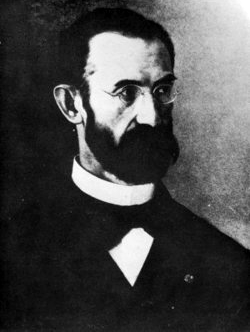

Prime Minister of Serbia
- In office 2 November 1880 – 3 October 1883
- Monarch: Milan I
- Preceded by: Jovan Ristić
- Succeeded by: Nikola Hristić

Personal details
- Born: 7 January 1837 Jagodina, Serbia
- Died: March 1, 1897 (aged 60) Belgrade, Serbia
- Party: Progressive Party
- Occupation: Judge, lawyer, politician and diplomat

Milan Piroćanac (Serbian Cyrillic: Милан Пироћанац; 7 January 1837 – 1 March 1897) was a Serbian jurist, politician, Prime Minister and the leader and founder of the Progressive Party.

== Early life ==
Milan Nedeljković was born in 1837 in Jagodina. His father Stevan Nedeljković, born in Pirot (hence his byname), was a Revolutionary veteran and srez chief of Knjaževac. His mother Milica, from the Jagodina okrug, was earlier married to vojvoda Pavle Cukić.

He finished primary school in Jagodina, a gymnasium in Kragujevac and Belgrade. He continued studies in law at the Belgrade Lyceum (1854–56), after which he at the end of 1856 moved to Paris where he finished the Law University in 1860. In 1861 he studied at Heidelberg, until returning to Belgrade at the end of 1861. He adopted the name Piroćanac during his school years.

== Politics ==
Serbian politician Ilija Garašanin recruited Piroćanac into the Foreign Ministry of Serbia. After Serbia and Montenegro concluded an alliance in 1866, brokered by Prince Mihailo Obrenović and Prince Nikola I Petrović-Njegoš so that the two Serb principalities could jointly fight the Ottoman Empire, Piroćanac spent several months in Cetinje, as a political representative of Serbia, serving, in addition, as a secretary to Prince Nikola. He began a career as a judge in 1868 and was posted at the Court of Cassation in 1872.

Piroćanac was elected Minister of Foreign Affairs in the conservative-liberal alliance cabinet led by Jovan Marinović (November 25, 1874 to January 22, 1875). After the end of his short ministerial term he returned to the Court of Cassation.

Being a prominent member of the younger Western-educated Serbian conservatives, Piroćanac was the founder of the Progressive Party in 1880, gathered around the journal Videlo (Daylight), which propagated loyalty to the Crown and “law, freedom and progress”.

Invited by Prince Milan Obrenović to form a government, Piroćanac formed a Progressive cabinet on October 19, 1880, that during its three years in office introduced significant reforms into Serbian society. Under his government Serbia concluded a commercial treaty with Austria-Hungary and started the strategically important construction of a railway (Belgrade-Niš and Niš-Pirot) in order to link Serbia with both Central Europe and Ottoman Turkey. The Education Minister in his government, Stojan Novaković, made primary school compulsory and modernized school curricula, putting emphasis on liberal and positivist subjects instead of on classical Latin-based education.

Prince Milan, together with his Foreign Minister Čedomilj Mijatović, formalized his relations with Vienna, by preparing and signing the "Secret Convention" in 1881, a document unknown both to the Serbian parliament and the wider public, that put Serbian foreign policy under Austrian tutelage. This was a major point of disagreement between the Prince and his Prime Minister, and in order to avoid any further lack of loyalty from Čedomilj Mijatović, Piroćanac took the office of Foreign Minister to himself, leaving Mijatović solely the post of finance minister. Nevertheless, Mijatović provoked another scandal, during the bankruptcy of l’Union Générale from Paris, by granting them consent to realize a set of state bonds for the railway loan. In order to avoid a financial catastrophe, both Prince Milan and Prime Minister Piroćanac asked for the support of Austria-Hungary, having in mind both the survival of the Progressive party government and the need to avoid any radical change of foreign-policy orientation (i.e. towards Russia). According to Slobodan Jovanović, Piroćanac was convinced that Serbia could rely on Austria without danger, because it would probably turn into a federal state, which Serbia would be able to enter without losing its national and state individuality.

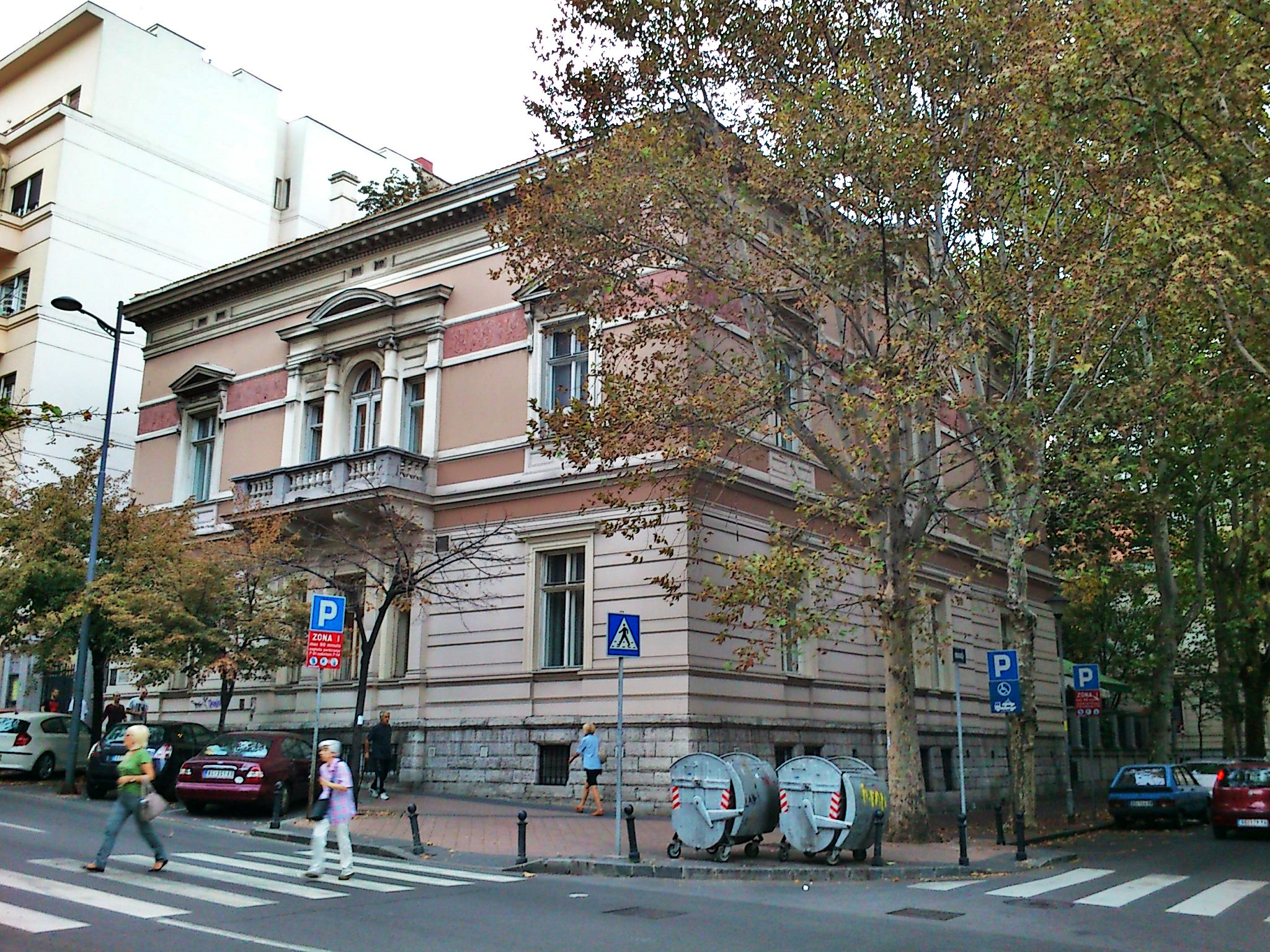
House of Milan Piroćanac in Belgrade

Austrian mediation turned to be quite helpful and Prime Minister Piroćanac, in order to appease the situation, instead of an extensive financial report, presented to the National Assembly a draft law on the proclamation of the Kingdom of Serbia, with Prince Milan Obrenović as its new King (the first Serbian king since the Middle Ages), a proposal which was greeted with joy and approval by the deputies. Acceptance of this proposal on 22 February 22 (old style), strengthened, at least for a while, the position of the Piroćanac cabinet. The Austro-Hungarian occupation of the Bosnia Vilayet and fears of its annexation presented a new challenge. Piroćanac threatened to resign, while in addition negative comments in the Serbian press, as well as Serb press outside Serbia, contributed to the decision in Vienna to postpone the plans for the annexation of Bosnia in 1883.

Facing one crisis after another, Prime Minister Piroćanac, lacking the support of Prince, later King, Milan, had no room left to prepare a new, more liberal constitution that would replace the old one of 1869. Piroćanac, as most other Progressives, was in favour of a two chamber system, advocating the upper chamber of Parliament as an obstacle against populism (“despotism of the masses”), ascribed mostly to the then-opposition National Radical Party of Nikola Pašić. The upper chamber, consisting of intellectuals appointed by the King would, as he proposed, control the irresponsible and uneducated peasant, mostly Radical, deputies.

The Piroćanac government did manage to, however, pass a set of extremely important democratic Western-inspired laws in that would provide the political framework for future democratic development: the law on judicial independence (February 9, 1881), the law on the freedom of the press (March 28, 1881), on political association and organization (April 1, 1881), as well as the law on creating a standing army (January 3, 1883). With other laws promulgated, in particular on free elections, local autonomy and taxation, the Piroćanac government made possible the accelerated modernization and Europenisation of the predominantly patriarchal society of Serbia, therefore being a crucial stage of the country's development, both economic and political.

== Resignation and last years ==
Piroćanac resigned on September 21, 1883 after his party was defeated at the general election held the same month. Piroćanac remained the party leader until 1886. He resigned from the party leadership of the Progressive party and political life in general after a long quarrel with his deputy Milutin Garašanin over the defeat in the war against Bulgaria the previous year (1885).

Piroćanac afterwards returned to practicing law and represented foreign companies in Belgrade. His old mansion in Belgrade, at Francuska street no. 7, is now the seat of the Writer's Union of Serbia.

== Selected works ==
- Medjunarodni položaj Srbije, Beograd 1892.
- Knez Mihailo i zajednička radnja balkanskih naroda, Beograd 1895.
- Beleške povodom jedne diplomatske istorije, Beograd 1896. Reprinted in 2004, Beograd.

== See also ==
- House of Milan Piroćanac

== References and further reading ==
- Živanović, Živan (1925). Politička istorija Srbije u drugoj polovini devetnaestog veka. G. Kon.
- Slobodan Jovanović, Vlada Milana Obrenovića, vol. I-II, BIGZ, Beograd 1990.
- Jovanović, Slobodan (1990). Političke i pravne rasprave. Belgrade: BIGZ.
- Gale Stokes, Politics as Development. The Emergence of Political Parties in Nineteenth-Century Serbia, Duke University Press, Durham & London 1990
- Alex N. Dragnich, The Development of Parliamentary Government in Serbia, East European Monographs & Columbia University Press, Boulder & New York 1978.
- Grgur Jakšić, Iz srpske istorije. Abdikacija Kralja Milana i druge rasprave, Prosveta, Beograd 1956.

Government offices
Preceded by Jovan Ristić	Prime Minister of Serbia; 1880–1883	Succeeded by Nikola Hristić
Preceded by Jovan Avakumović	Minister of Justice of Serbia; 1880–1881	Succeeded by Dimitrije G. Radović
Preceded by Jovan Marinović	Minister of Foreign Affairs; 1874–1875	Succeeded by Milan Bogićević
Preceded by Čedomilj Mijatović	Minister of Foreign Affairs; 1888–1889	Succeeded by Sava Grujić
