= Petar Velimirović =

Serbian politician

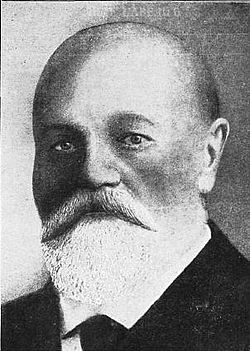
Petar Velimirović

Petar Velimirović also known as Pera Velimirović (16 January 1848 – 23 December 1911) was a Serbian politician and one of the founders of the People's Radical Party in Serbia.

== Biography ==
Velimirović was born in Sikole, Negotin. He graduated in engineering from the Polytechnic Institute (now known as ETH Zurich) in Zurich in 1876.

After being arrested as a follower of Svetozar Marković for his participation in the socialist events in Kragujevac, he escaped to Hungary. After the Timok Rebellion was crushed in 1883, he emigrated to Bulgaria where he briefly taught at a Sofia gymnasium. Later, in the decade he returned to Serbia. where he was appointed as Minister of Public Works in 1887, in the cabinet of Jovan Ristić, and the same department had in the cabinets Đorđe Simić, Nikola Pašić and Sava Grujić. At the end of 1902, Velimirović formed his own cabinet, which was short-lived (one month).

In 1903, Velimirović was Chairman of the National Assembly session, which was decided on the choice of Petar I for the King of Serbia. Velimirović was the head of the cabinet for the second time from 7 July 1908 to 11 February 1909. Velimirović died in Belgrade, aged 63.

== See also ==
- List of prime ministers of Serbia

Government offices
| Preceded by Mihailo Vujić | Prime Minister of Serbia; 1902 | Succeeded by Dimitrije Cincar-Marković |
| Preceded by Nikola Pašić | Prime Minister of Serbia; 1908–1909 | Succeeded by Stojan Novaković |
