= Ministry of Foreign Affairs (Serbia) =

Government ministry of Serbia

- Министарство спољних послова Ministarstvo spoljnih poslova

Ministry overview
- Formed: 17 February 1811; 215 years ago (current form since 1991)
- Jurisdiction: Government of Serbia
- Headquarters: Ministry of Foreign Affairs Building, Kneza Miloša Street 24–26, Belgrade
- Minister responsible: Marko Đurić
- Website: mfa.gov.rs

The Ministry of Foreign Affairs (Serbian: Министарство спољних послова, romanized: Ministarstvo spoljnih poslova) is a ministry in the Government of Serbia which is in the charge of foreign relations. The current minister is Marko Đurić, in office since 2 May 2024.

Its headquarters are located in the Ministry of Foreign Affairs Building.

== Organization ==
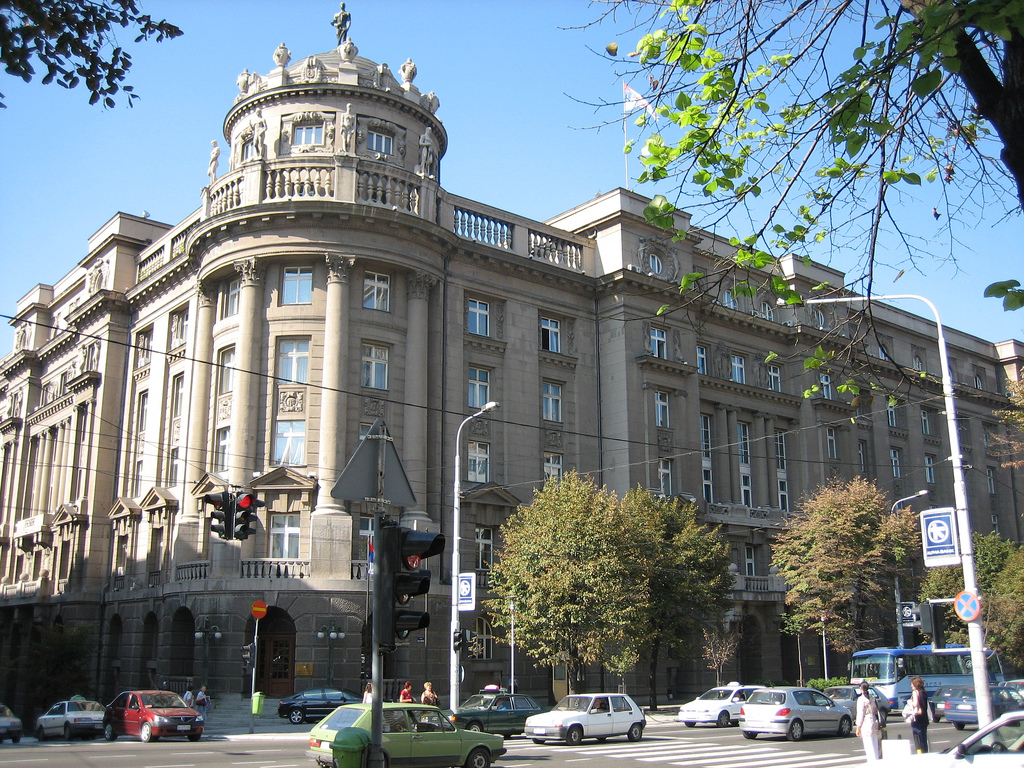
Ministry of Foreign Affairs Building

The ministry is organized as following:

- Secretariat-General
  - Department for Personnel and Legal Affairs
  - Department for Property Legal and Common Affairs
  - Department for International Legal Affairs
  - Department for Finance
  - Department for Security
  - Department for ICT
  - Diplomatic Protocol
  - Diplomatic Archives
  - Diplomatic Academy
- Directorate for Bilateral Cooperation
  - Department for Neighboring and South-East European Countries
  - Department for Europe
  - Department for Russia and Eurasia
  - Department for North America and South America
  - Department for Africa and the Middle East
  - Department for Asia, Australia, and the Pacific
  - Department for Bilateral Economic Cooperation
  - Department for Borders
- Directorate for Multilateral Cooperation
  - Department for the United Nations
  - Department for OSCE and Council of Europe
  - Department for Multilateral Economic Cooperation
  - Department for UN Human Rights System and Humanitarian Issues
- Directorate for the European Union
  - Department for the Institutions of the European Union
  - Department for EU Sectoral Policies
  - Department for Regional Initiatives
- Directorate for Security Policy
  - Department for NATO and Partnership for Peace
  - Department for EU Common Security and Defence Policy
  - Department for Arms Control
- Directorate for Economic Diplomacy
  - Department for Arms Control
  - Department for Promotion of Exports
  - Department for Attracting Foreign Dirwct Investments
- Directorate for Consular Affairs
- Directorate for Cooperation with the Diaspora and Serbs in the Region

=== Diplomatic Archives ===
The Diplomatic Archives of the Ministry of Foreign Affairs were established in 1919 on premises of former diplomatic archives of the Kingdom of Serbia and Kingdom of Yugoslavia.

=== Diplomatic Academy ===
The Diplomatic Academy was formed in 1998 from the former Diplomatic School of the Ministry of Foreign Affairs.

== List of ministers ==
This list includes ministers of foreign affairs (and the acting ministers of foreign affairs) of the Revolutionary Serbia, the Principality of Serbia, and the Kingdom of Serbia from the creation of this post in 1811 to the formation of Yugoslavia after World War I in 1918. The list also includes ministers of foreign affairs of the Republic of Serbia from 1991 to 1993, and after the restoration of independence in 2006. For ministers of foreign affairs for the 1918–1991 and 1993–2006 periods, see List of ministers of foreign affairs of Yugoslavia.

=== Revolutionary Serbia ===
Minister	Took office	Left office	Grand Vožd
Miljko Radonjić; Миљко Радоњић (1770–1836)	4 February 1811	25 December 1812	Karađorđe

=== Principality of Serbia ===
Conservative Party Liberal Party Serbian Progressive Party Non-party

Minister	Took office	Left office	Prince
Dimitrije Davidović; Димитрије Давидовић (1789–1838)	8 June 1834	3 February 1835	Miloš Obrenović
Avram Petronijević; Аврам Петронијевић (1791–1852)	3 February 1835	3 May 1840	Miloš Obrenović
Đorđe Protić; Ђорђе Протић (1793–1857)	3 May 1840	26 October 1842	Mihailo Obrenović
Aleksa Janković; Алекса Јанковић (1806–1869); Acting	26 October 1842	24 September 1843	Alexander Karađorđević
Aleksa Simić; Алекса Симић (1800–1872)	24 September 1843	29 September 1844	Alexander Karađorđević
Avram Petronijević; Аврам Петронијевић (1791–1852)	29 September 1844	10 April 1852	Alexander Karađorđević
Aleksa Janković; Алекса Јанковић (1806–1869); Acting	10 April 1852	13 September 1852	Alexander Karađorđević
Ilija Garašanin; Илија Гарашанин (1812–1874)	13 September 1852	14 March 1853	Alexander Karađorđević
Aleksa Simić; Алекса Симић (1800–1872)	14 March 1853	16 December 1855	Alexander Karađorđević
Aleksa Janković; Алекса Јанковић (1806–1869)	16 December 1855	29 May 1856	Alexander Karađorđević
Stevan Marković; Стеван Марковић (1804–1864)	29 May 1856	16 September 1856	Alexander Karađorđević
Aleksa Simić; Алекса Симић (1800–1872)	16 September 1856	19 June 1857	Alexander Karađorđević
Stevan Marković; Стеван Марковић (1804–1864)	19 June 1857	31 March 1858	Alexander Karađorđević
Stevan Magazinović; Стеван Магазиновић (1804–1874)	31 March 1858	6 April 1859	Miloš Obrenović
Cvetko Rajović; Цветко Рајовић (1793–1873)	6 April 1859	27 October 1860	Miloš Obrenović
Filip Hristić; Филип Христић (1819–1905)	27 October 1860	9 December 1861	Mihailo Obrenović
Ilija Garašanin; Илија Гарашанин (1812–1874)	9 December 1861	3 November 1867	Mihailo Obrenović
Jovan Ristić; Јован Ристић (1831–1899)	3 November 1867	21 November 1867	Mihailo Obrenović
Milan Petronijević; Милан Петронијевић (1831–1914)	21 November 1867	21 June 1868	Mihailo Obrenović
Radivoje Milojković; Радивој Милојковић (1833–1888); Acting	21 June 1868	24 September 1868	Milan Obrenović
Dimitrije Matić; Димитрије Матић (1821–1884); Acting	24 September 1868	10 August 1872	Milan Obrenović
Jovan Ristić; Јован Ристић (1831–1899)	10 August 1872	22 October 1873	Milan Obrenović
Jovan Marinović; Јован Мариновић (1821–1893)	22 October 1873	25 November 1874	Milan Obrenović
Milan Piroćanac; Милан Пироћанац (1837–1897)	25 November 1874	20 January 1875	Milan Obrenović
Milan Bogićević; Милан Богићевић (1840–1929)	20 January 1875	19 August 1875	Milan Obrenović
Jovan Ristić; Јован Ристић (1831–1899)	19 August 1875	26 September 1875	Milan Obrenović
Đorđe M. Pavlović; Ђорђе Павловић (1838–1921)	26 September 1875	24 April 1876	Milan Obrenović
Jovan Ristić; Јован Ристић (1831–1899)	24 April 1876	21 October 1880	Milan Obrenović
Čedomilj Mijatović; Чедомиљ Мијатовић (1842–1932)	21 October 1880	10 October 1881	Milan Obrenović
Milan Piroćanac; Милан Пироћанац (1837–1897)	10 October 1881	7 March 1882	Milan Obrenović

=== Kingdom of Serbia ===
Liberal Party Serbian Progressive Party People's Radical Party Independent Radical Party Non-party

Minister	Took office	Left office	King
Milan Piroćanac; Милан Пироћанац (1837–1897)	7 March 1882	21 September 1883	Milan I
Milan Bogićević; Милан Богићевић (1840–1929)	21 September 1883	7 February 1884	Milan I
Milutin Garašanin; Милутин Гарашанин (1843–1898)	7 February 1884	23 March 1886	Milan I
Dragutin Franasović; Драгутин Франасовић (1842–1914)	23 March 1886	1 June 1887	Milan I
Jovan Ristić; Јован Ристић (1831–1899)	1 June 1887	19 December 1887	Milan I
Dragutin Franasović; Драгутин Франасовић (1842–1914)	19 December 1887	14 April 1888	Milan I
Čedomilj Mijatović; Чедомиљ Мијатовић (1842–1932)	14 April 1888	23 February 1889	Milan I
Sava Grujić; Сава Грујић (1840–1913)	23 February 1889	11 February 1891	Alexander I
Mihailo Kr. Đorđević; Михаило Кр. Ђорђевић (1850–1901)	11 February 1891	21 March 1892	Alexander I
Nikola Pašić; Никола Пашић (1845–1926)	21 March 1892	9 August 1892	Alexander I
Jovan Avakumović; Јован Авакумовић (1841–1928)	9 August 1892	1 April 1893	Alexander I
Andra Nikolić; Андра Николић (1853–1918)	1 April 1893	23 November 1893	Alexander I
Sava Grujić; Сава Грујић (1840–1913)	23 November 1893	12 January 1894	Alexander I
Đorđe Simić; Ђорђе Симић (1843–1921)	12 January 1894	21 March 1894	Alexander I
Sima Lozanić; Сима Лозанић (1847–1935)	21 March 1894	15 October 1894	Alexander I
Milan Bogićević; Милан Богићевић (1840–1929)	15 October 1894	25 June 1895	Alexander I
Stojan Novaković; Стојан Новаковић (1842–1915)	25 June 1895	17 December 1896	Alexander I
Đorđe Simić; Ђорђе Симић (1843–1921)	17 December 1896	11 October 1897	Alexander I
Vladan Đorđević; Владан Ђорђевић (1844–1930)	11 October 1897	8 July 1900	Alexander I
Aleksa Jovanović; Алекса Јовановић (1846–1920)	12 July 1900	5 February 1901	Alexander I
Mihailo Vujić; Михаило Вујић (1853–1913)	5 February 1901	7 October 1902	Alexander I
Vasilije Antonić; Василије Антонић (1860–1929)	7 October 1902	23 December 1902	Alexander I
Sima Lozanić; Сима Лозанић (1847–1935)	23 December 1902	23 March 1903	Alexander I
Pavle Denić; Павле Денић (1855–1939); Acting	23 March 1903	29 May 1903	Alexander I
Ljubomir Kaljević; Љубомир Каљевић (1841–1907)	29 May 1903	21 September 1903	Peter I
Andra Nikolić; Андра Николић (1853–1918)	21 September 1903	20 January 1904	Peter I
Nikola Pašić; Никола Пашић (1845–1926)	26 January 1904	16 May 1905	Peter I
Jovan Žujović; Јован Жујовић (1856–1936)	16 May 1905	2 December 1905	Peter I
Vasilije Antonić; Василије Антонић (1860–1929)	2 December 1905	17 April 1906	Peter I
Nikola Pašić; Никола Пашић (1845–1926)	17 April 1906	7 July 1908	Peter I
Milovan Milovanović; Милован Миловановић (1863–1912)	7 July 1908	18 June 1912	Peter I
Jovan Jovanović; Јован Јовановић (1869–1939)	18 June 1912	27 August 1912	Peter I
Nikola Pašić; Никола Пашић (1845–1926)	30 August 1912	10 March 1918	Peter I
Mihailo Gavrilović; Михаило Гавриловић (1868–1924); Acting	10 March 1918	3 November 1918	Peter I
Stojan Protić; Стојан Протић (1857–1923); Acting	3 November 1918	7 December 1918	Peter I

=== Republic of Serbia ===
Political Party: SPS SPO DS SNS n-p

No.	Portrait	Minister	Took office	Left office	Time in office	Party	Cabinet
1	Branko Mikašinović	Branko Mikašinović (1924–1999)	15 February 1991	31 July 1991	166 days	SPS	Zelenović
2	Vladislav Jovanović	Vladislav Jovanović (1933–2026)	31 July 1991	14 July 1992	349 days	SPS	Zelenović; Božović
(2)	Vladislav Jovanović	Vladislav Jovanović (1933–2026)	30 September 1992	4 March 1993	155 days	SPS	Božović; Šainović
Part of Ministry of Foreign Affairs of FR Yugoslavia and the State Union of Serbia and Montenegro
3	Vuk Drašković	Vuk Drašković (born 1946)	4 June 2006	15 May 2007	345 days	SPO	Koštunica I
4	Vuk Jeremić	Vuk Jeremić (born 1975)	15 May 2007	27 July 2012	5 years, 73 days	DS	Koštunica II; Cvetković
5	Ivan Mrkić	Ivan Mrkić (born 1953)	27 July 2012	27 April 2014	1 year, 274 days	Independent	Dačić
6	Ivica Dačić	Ivica Dačić (born 1966)	27 April 2014	22 October 2020	6 years, 178 days	SPS	Vučić I–II; Brnabić
–	Ana Brnabić	Ana Brnabić (born 1975); Acting	22 October 2020	28 October 2020	6 days	SNS	Brnabić
7	Nikola Selaković	Nikola Selaković (born 1983)	28 October 2020	26 October 2022	1 year, 363 days	SNS	Brnabić II
(6)	Ivica Dačić	Ivica Dačić (born 1966)	26 October 2022	2 May 2024	1 year, 189 days	SPS	Brnabić III
8	Marko Đurić	Marko Đurić (born 1983)	2 May 2024	Incumbent	2 years, 182 days	SNS	Vučević; Macut

== See also ==
- Foreign relations of Serbia
- Ministry of Foreign Affairs (Yugoslavia)
