= Čedomilj Mijatović =

Serbian statesman, economist, historian, writer and diplomat

Count Čedomilj Mijatović Чедомиљ Мијатовић
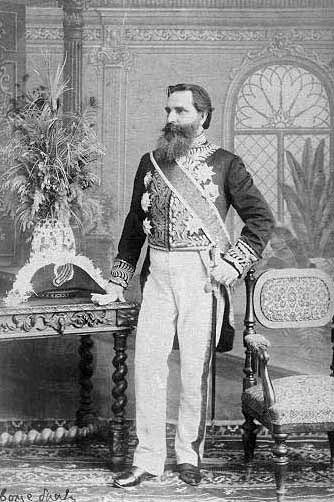

Minister of Finance
- In office 1873–1874; 1875; 1880–1883; 1886–1887; 1888–1889; 1894

Minister of Foreign Affairs
- In office 1880–1881; 1888–1889

Personal details
- Born: October 17, 1842 Belgrade, Principality of Serbia
- Died: May 14, 1932 (aged 89) London, United Kingdom
- Party: Progressive
- Spouse: Elodie Lawton
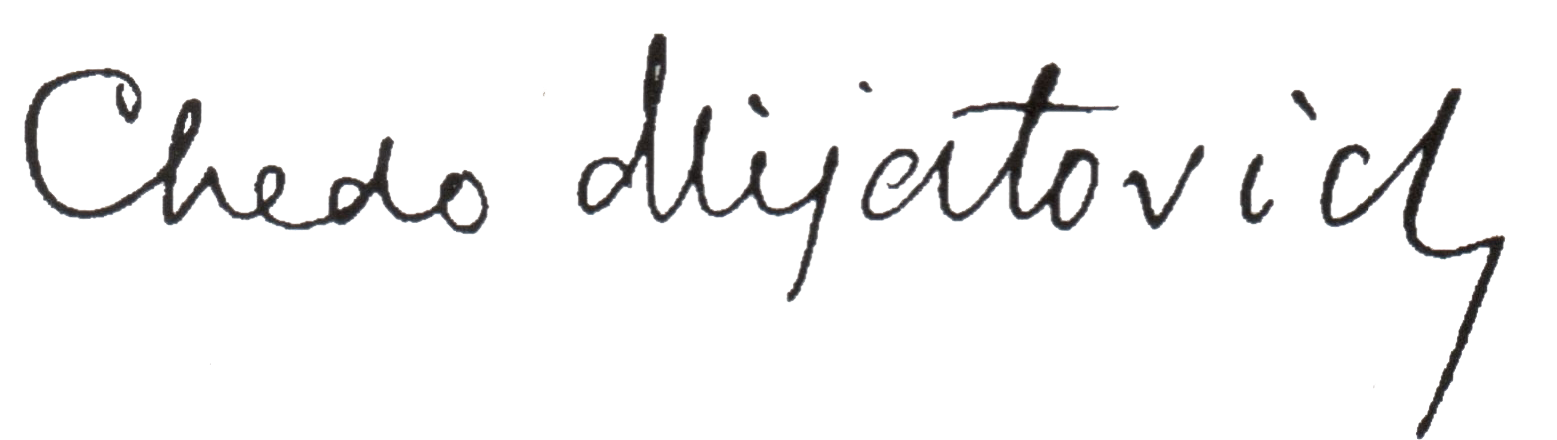
- Signature
- Nickname: Čedo

Count Čedomilj Mijatović (Serbian Cyrillic: Чедомиљ Мијатовић; 17 October 1842 – May 14, 1932) was a Serbian statesman, economist, historian, writer and diplomat.

Mijatović served as the Minister of Finance six times between 1873 and 1894 and as the Minister of Foreign Affairs between 1880 and 1881 and again from 1888 to 1889. He was one of the leaders of the liberal Serbian Progressive Party. He also served as the Minister plenipotentiary of Serbia to the Court of St James's (1884–1885; 1895–1900, and 1902/1903), to Romania (1894), and the Ottoman Empire (1900).

== Biography ==
=== Early life and education ===
His father Milan (1805–1852) was a lawyer who came to Serbia from the southern part of the Austrian Empire and became a teacher of Latin, history, and geography in Belgrade's First Gymnasium (Grammar School). However, Čedomilj Mijatović was primarily influenced by his mother, Rakila Kristina (1826–1901), who was of mixed Serbian-Spanish origin.

Mijatović studied a combination of economic courses and sciences in Munich, Zurich and Leipzig between 1863 and 1865 and completed his education by gaining experience from the National Bank of Austria and Kredit Anstalt in Vienna. He was a student of Lorenz von Stein and Karl Heinrich Rau and also accepted in his book theses the influences of Frédéric Bastiat and Henry Charles Carey. During his studies in Germany, he met his future British wife Elodie Lawton (1825–1908), previously a dedicated abolitionist in Boston, who influenced him significantly, and turned him into a devoted Anglophile. She was the first English-speaking female historian in Serbia and she published The History of Modern Serbia in 1872. Later she published a collection of Serbian folk short stories and a collection of Serbian epic poems.

At the age of 23, he became a professor at the Belgrade's Velika škola, the highest educational institution in Serbia of that age. He taught political economy and wrote three very influential textbooks, two of which were based on Lorenz von Stein. In these works, he demonstrated his affinity for the liberal economy and influenced many later Serbian economists to take similar positions. As a professor, he started campaigning in favor of building a railway through Serbia. He gained many supporters among merchants and educated men for this idea, but many opposed him in Serbia during this campaign. He was also the earliest critic of communist and socialist utopian ideas in Serbia. His translation of Henry Thomas Buckle's book History of Civilisation in England, was published in Serbian in 1871 and influenced several generations of pro-Western Serbs.

=== Efforts to reform the Serbian Orthodox Church ===
Mijatović's wife was a member of the Wesleyan Church and was able to imbue her husband with nonconformist religious devotion. However, he always remained faithful to the Serbian Orthodox Church but wanted to bring some religious zeal into it. That was not a very popular task in Serbia of his time. He found a collaborator in this endeavor in the person of a Belgrade priest Aleksa Ilić who established a religious monthly Hrishchanski Vesnik (Christian Messenger, in Serbian Cyrillic: Хришћански весник), the first journal dedicated to a religious revival in Serbia. A Scottish philanthropist Francis Mackenzie who settled in Belgrade helped this project materially and Mijatović remained one of the main contributors of the journal.

He was the most active and influential Serbian translator from English during the 19th century. The bibliography of his translations includes about a dozen titles. Most of them deal with religious topics. That was his effort to contribute to a religious revival. His translations into Serbian include sermons of well-known British preachers such as Dr. Charles Haddon Spurgeon, Canon Henry Parry Liddon and Dr. Macduff. He also translated John Bunyan's The Pilgrim's Progress and Dr. David Brown's Commentaries to the Gospels.

=== Mijatović as cabinet minister ===
At the age of thirty-one, he was already Minister of Finance at the end of 1873. He started his career as a protégé of the leader of the subsequent Liberal Party, Jovan Ristić, but soon joined the club of so-called young conservatives who turned into a kind of the personal party of the Serbian ruler, Prince Milan Obrenović (Prince from 1868, and King from 1882 till 1889). In the Government of Jovan Marinović, from November 1873 till December 1874 he was Minister of Finance for the second time and in that capacity, he was instrumental in bringing important reforms. He introduced the metric system to Serbia. Serbia joined the Latin Monetary Union and he christened the new domestic currency, the dinar, after Serbia's medieval silver currency. He always considered his most important achievement in this government the law stipulating the amount of property that had to be left to peasants, and could not be confiscated to cover their debts. This minimal amount included peasant's house, a yoke of oxen, the plow, and five acres of land. He was elected for the third time as Minister of Finance in the Government of Danilo Stefanović in 1875. Mijatović along with Dimitrije Matić, Konstantin Cukić, Mihailo Vujić and a couple of others were among the top economists of the last decade of the Constitutionalist period.

The group of young conservatives he joined established the newspaper Videlo and soon came to power in October 1880. In the Government of Milan Piroćanac, Mijatović got two tenures. He was Minister of Foreign Affairs for the fourth time and Minister of Finance. Being a close friend of the ruler and in control of the two key ministries, he was considered by many diplomats as the most influential person of this Cabinet. Prince Milan used him for the most significant missions. The two decisions that shaped Serbia's history for many years were carried out by Mijatović.

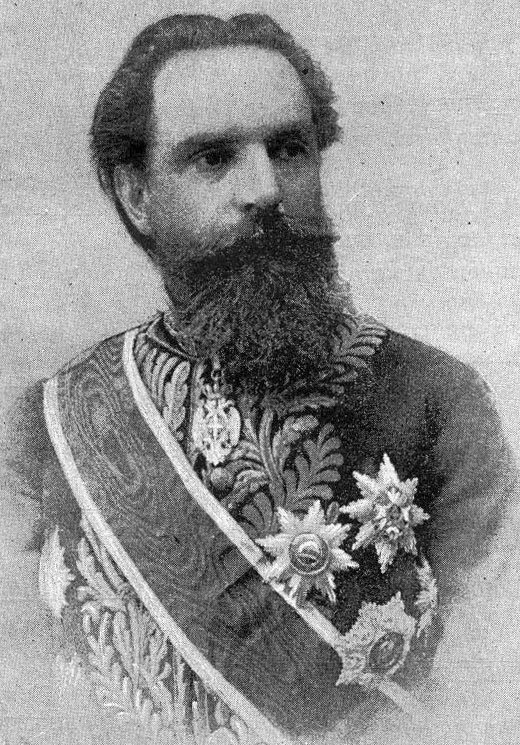
Photograph of Čedomil Mijatović, published in Nova iskra 24 (1899).

When modern political parties were created in Serbia, in 1881, the Progressive Party turned out to be the only of the three Serbian parties (the other two being the mostly pro-Russian Liberal Party and very pro-Russian Radical Party) that was ready to make an agreement with Austria-Hungary, which became the most influential country in Serbia after the Congress of Berlin in 1878. The ruler decided to open a new page in Serbian foreign policy and arranged that a secret convention should be signed with the Habsburg monarchy. Mijatović was gradually entrusted by the ruler to complete this task and on June 28, 1881, he signed the Secret Convention by which Serbia got the diplomatic and political backing of the Habsburg Empire but abandoned her independence in the field of Foreign Policy. When the two other most prominent members of the Cabinet, Prime Minister Piroćanac and Home Minister Garašanin learned about the exact contents of the Convention they decided to resign but had to accept the new reality in the end. In return, Mijatović had to resign his post as Minister of Foreign Affairs and kept only his tenure at the Ministry of Finance. His last act as Minister of Foreign Affairs was to sign a Consular Convention and a Commercial Agreement with the United States of America on October 14. 1881. During talks that preceded the signing of the Secret Convention Mijatović was well received in Vienna by the Emperor Francis Joseph and other dignitaries of the Empire. The Emperor later decorated him with the first class of the Order of the Iron Crown, which entitled its bearer to become an Austro-Hungarian count. Serbian citizens were banned by the Serbian constitution to accept any nobility titles. It is not clear if Mijatović ever officially submitted an application to become an Austro-Hungarian count, yet he used this title openly since 1915, being the only Serb from the Kingdom of Serbia who did it.

=== Affair with Union Général ===
As the Minister of Finance Mijatović had to secure Serbia's commitments from the Berlin Treaty by which she undertook to build the part of the Vienna-Constantinople railway line that went through Serbia. Since Serbia could not finance the project herself a proper foreign creditor had to be found and a Parisian financial society called Union Général was selected in 1881. Unfortunately, it faced bankruptcy as soon as the beginning of 1882, which brought the already shaky state of Serbian finances very close to complete disaster. Learning of the bankruptcy Mijatović urgently traveled to Paris and there supported by Austro-Hungarian diplomacy found a way out. Another financial house Comptoir national d'escompte de Paris (CNEP) took on the projects without detriment to Serbia. In spite of this success, the reputation of Mijatović's party suffered a serious blow and never recovered. It turned out that the agents of the Union Général in Belgrade had tried to bribe many MPs and politicians and the reputation of the Progressivists suffered the most from this. He took personal part in preparing a law on the establishment of the National Bank of Serbia that was passed by the Serbian Parliament in January 1883. He advocated the establishment of such an institution long before and had an opportunity to establish it during his tenure. The Government of the Progressivists resigned in October 1883.

=== Negotiator of the Peace Treaty at Bucharest ===
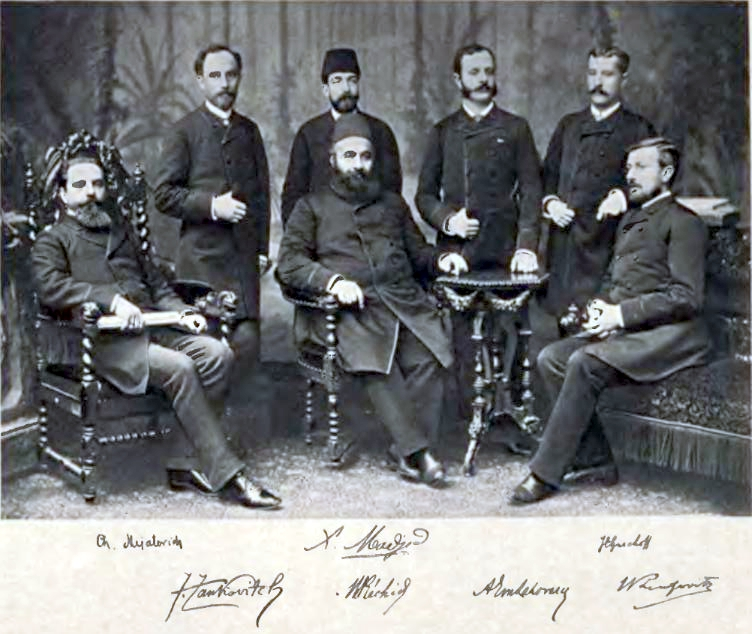
Mijatović was a signee of the Treaty of Bucharest

Being a lonely Serbian Anglophile Mijatović wished to be appointed as the first Serbian Minister in London, but had to wait until October 1884 when he became the second Serbian Minister at the Court of St James's. During this tenure, he came into contact with many influential persons but his diplomatic post in London soon ended since he was appointed to be the sole Serbian negotiator in Bucharest where peace negotiations were scheduled following the Serbo-Bulgarian War. Serbia attacked Bulgaria on November 14, 1885, and within two weeks suffered a humiliating defeat. It was thanks to the Secret Convention signed with Austria-Hungary that Serbia was able to get out of the war without suffering more serious consequences. In Bucharest Mijatović and the Bulgarian representative Ivan Evstratiev Geshov concluded, on March 3, 1886, one of the shortest treaties in diplomatic history with one article only: Article seul et unique. – L’état de paix qui a cessé d’exister entre le Royaume de Serbie et la Principauté du Bulgarie le 2–14 Novembre, 1885, est rétabli à partir de l’échange de ratification du present traité qui aura lieu à Bucharest. Mijatović proved to be a peacemaker since he had ignored instructions from Belgrade that were prepared in such a way that he was supposed to find an excuse for a new war. Apparently, Mijatović was more worried about what sort of reputation he would have in England if negotiations failed than about criticism from Belgrade for his conciliatory approach.

=== First self exile to London ===
Having returned from Bucharest Mijatović became for the fifth time Finance Minister in the Government of Milutin Garašanin in 1886/1887. Finally, in 1887/1889 he was for the second time Foreign Minister in the Government of Nikola Hristić (Hristić). In this capacity, he signed a renewal of the Secret Convention. However, the decision of King Milan to abdicate on March 6, 1889, effectively ended his special position at the Court. The new government encouraged persecution of the members of the Progressive Party. Faced with all these failures he decided to leave Serbia and withdrew to Britain in September 1889.

He found refuge in London where he spent years between 1889 and 1894 and was committed to writing novels in Serbian based on gothic novels of Sir Walter Scott and historical works. Novels that he wrote in these years made him perhaps the most popular Serbian writer of his age. He added to his fame by publishing a book entitled On Conditions for Success [О условима успеха/O uslovima uspeha] in 1892 based on Samuel Smiles' bestseller Self-Help. In Britain, he became well known when he published a book on the last Byzantine Emperor. Owing to this book he was elected to be an honorary member of the Royal Historical Society, being the first Serb to attain such a distinction. Sometime earlier he had become the second President of the Serbian Royal Academy, in 1888, but he resigned this post in 1889. It was in London, where Mijatović obtained introductions to the most celebrated writers in Britain and became a contributor to the Encyclopædia Britannica.

=== Diplomatic career ===
In 1894 he returned from his self-exile to become Minister of Finance for the sixth and last time, but his tenure ended with the resignation of the whole Government after only two months in April 1894. He spent the rest of that year as a Serbian Minister in Bucharest but was recalled at the end of 1894. In April 1895 he got his favorite appointment. He became for the second time Serbian Envoy Extraordinary and Minister Plenipotentiary at the Court of St James's and kept this position until 1900. During this mandate he represented Serbia at the Hague Peace Conference in May–July 1899 where he advocated very progressive views, but both Aleksandar Obrenović and the Serbian Government did not share his enthusiasm for the instruments of international law and international arbitration. In 1900 he was put in the most important diplomatic place for Serbia. He became Serbian Minister in Constantinople but was recalled since he did not agree with the marriage of the Serbian King Alexander with a lady who was a commoner and a widow. He became a Serbian senator in 1901 and stayed in London trying to establish a Serbian Commercial Agency. At the end of 1902, he was appointed for the third time to be Serbian Minister in London, and he presented his credentials to King Edward VII in January 1903.

In the early morning of June 11, 1903, a conspiracy of Serbian officers killed King Alexander Obrenović and his unpopular wife Queen Draga. Having murdered them they threw their naked bodies out of a window. The new government consisted of regicides and it appointed Petar Karađorđević to be the new ruler of Serbia. The very event and composition of the new Cabinet caused widespread condemnation throughout Europe but only Britain and the Netherlands decided to break off diplomatic relations with Serbia. Mijatović was himself horrified and he was the only Serbian diplomat who resigned his post on June 22. This act was never forgiven to him by influential political circles in Belgrade.

Mijatović's name became known around the world thanks to a clairvoyant session that he attended together with a famous Victorian journalist William Thomas Stead. The result of the clairvoyant session that took place on the night of March 20, 1903, in Stead's opinion was that 'the bloody tragedy in the palace was seen clairvoyantly three months before it took place, and described in the hearing of at least a dozen credible witnesses'. Almost all the British dailies, as well as the American and continental press, commented on the prophecy. Later he was very much influenced by Stead and became a leading Serbian adherent of spiritism.

After the May Coup Mijatović stayed in London until the end of his life, though he tendered his resignation when the new Serbian government was formed in 1903. Mijatović was replaced by diplomat Aleksandar Jovičić (1856-1934). In 1908 he published his most popular book in English that went through three British and three American editions entitled Servia and the Servians. His reputation in Serbia after 1903 suffered greatly due to false rumors that he was implicated in a conspiracy to bring Prince Arthur, Duke of Connaught and Strathearn, beloved son of Queen Victoria, to the throne of Serbia. In 1911 he met King Peter Karageorgević in Paris and from this moment he was fully reconciled with the new regime in Serbia. Therefore, it is not surprising that he was considered as an unofficial member of the Serbian delegation in London during the London Conference in December 1912. Being a widower from 1908 he was considered as a favorite candidate of both the Serbian Government and the King to become the Archbishop of Skopje, which had two years earlier been incorporated to the Serbian state. But these efforts failed.

He became very active again at the beginning of the First World War. He wrote many letters and articles to British dailies but his most remarkable action in this field was his visit to the United States and Canada. He was accompanied by the most famous British suffragette, Emmeline Pankhurst, who championed the causes of Britain's small allies (Belgium and Serbia) during World War I. A visit to the United States of America and Canada with such a well-known person caused such a sensation, brought crowds to Mijatović's lectures and enabled him to have well-attended lectures and to give interviews to the leading dailies.

He died in London on May 14, 1932.

He was awarded Order of the White Eagle, Legion of Honour, Order of the Cross of Takovo and a number of other decorations.

== Works in English ==
He published 19 books in Serbian, and 6 books in English:

- Constantine, the Last Emperor of the Greeks or the Conquest of Constantinople by the Turks (A.D. 1453), the first Serbian contribution to Byzantine history in English; after the Latest Historical Researches (London: Sampson Low, Marston & Company, 1892)
- Ancestors of the House of Orange (1892)
- A Royal Tragedy. Being the Story of the Assassination of King Alexander and Queen Draga of Servia (London: Eveleigh Nash, 1906)
- Servia and the Servians (London: Sir Isaac Pitman & Sons, 1908)
- A Short History of Russia and the Balkan States, authored with Sir Donald Mackenzie Wallace, Prince Kropotkin and J. D. Bourchier (London: The Encyclopædia Britannica Company, 1914)
- The Memoirs of a Balkan Diplomatist (London, New York, Toronto and Melbourne: Cassell and Co., 1917)

His book, Servia and the Servians, together with his entries on Serbia in the Tenth and Eleventh editions of the Encyclopædia Britannica, served a very important purpose of offering a more positive view of Serbia to the Anglo-American public at the beginning of the twentieth century during a very turbulent and decisive period for Serbia. He was, arguably, among the first Serbs to contribute to the Encyclopædia Britannica and some of his entries were reproduced up until 1973. The other was Prince Bojidar Karageorgevitch.

== Assessment ==
His long life in Britain made him a cultural bridge between the two nations. His role in British-Serbian relations is unmatched in terms of his influence on mutual relations. Many British Balkan experts were aware of this and had a very high opinion of Mijatović. James David Bourchier, a correspondent of The Times, remarked that "he is generally regarded by his fellow countrymen as the most learned man in Servia." William T. Stead, who met him during the Peace Conference in The Hague, was so delighted with him that he wrote: “It was almost worthwhile creating the Kingdom Servia if only to qualify Čedomilj Mijatovitch for a seat in the Parliament of the Nations.” Stead also had such a high opinion of Mijatović as a diplomat that in 1903 he remarked: “He is far and away from the best known, the most distinguished, and the most respected diplomatist the Balkan Peninsula has yet produced.” The leading British daily The Times covered almost every step Mijatović took during the eighties, especially through its Vienna correspondents. There are almost 300 contemporary articles of The Times mentioning Mijatović. At no time before had any Serbian minister, or any Serb at all, enjoyed such sympathies from The Times as did Mijatović in the last two decades of the nineteenth century. When he resigned his tenure as the President of the Serbian Royal Academy The Times commented: “Of all the statesmen in Servia, M. Mijatovitch is probably the one who holds the highest character in foreign countries. He has filled the principal offices in Servia, not only those that are rewarded for party services, by those conferred by public consent, if not by public acclamation, on men whose abilities are not judged by mere party conflicts.” Mijatović is considered to be the leading Serbian Liberal politician, alongside Slobodan Jovanović.

His whole working life was strongly influenced by the culture of Victorian Britain. In introducing Gothic novels into Serbian literature he was influenced by Sir Walter Scott. The inspiration for his religious pieces originated from Charles Haddon Spurgeon and Cannon Henry Parry Liddon. Even his policy was inspired by British statesmen, especially by William Ewart Gladstone and Lord Salisbury. In Britain, he became familiar with spiritualism, a widespread habit during the Victorian era. Through the influence of William Thomas Stead and Sir Oliver Lodge he gradually became an ardent believer in spiritualism and supernatural phenomena. Another British influence came in the field of parliamentarians. Mijatović wished to copy British budgetary debates but the Serbian parliament consisting mostly of peasant MPs did not quite understand this effort. Finally, he wanted to transmit a Protestant vision of ethics of labor and capital as formulated in bestsellers of Samuel Smiles and in the works of some Presbyterians. For this reason, he was called in a biography published on him in Serbian "a Victorian among Serbs".

== See also ==
- Mihailo V. Vujić
- Konstantin Cukić
- Dimitrije Matić
- List of Serbian historians

== Bibliography ==
- Count Chedomille Mijatovich, The Memoirs of a Balkan Diplomatist (London, New York, Toronto and Melbourne: Cassel and Co., 1917).
- Uroš Džonić, "Čedomilj Mijatović", Godišnjica Nikole Čupića, vol. XLII (1933), pp. 190–212.
- Slobodan Jovanović, Vlada Milana Obrenovića (The Rule of Milan Obrenović), in 2 vol., Belgrade, 1926 and 1927.
- Slobodan Jovanović, Vlada Aleksandra Obrenovića (The Rule of Aleksandar Obrenović), collected works, vol. 12, Belgrade: Geca Kon, 1936.
- Simha Kabiljo-Šutić, Posrednici dveju kultura. Studije o srpsko-engleskim književnim i kulturnim vezama (Mediators between two Cultures. Studies on Serbian-English Literary and Cultural Relations), Belgrade: Institut za književnost i jezik, 1989.
- Slobodan G. Markovich, British Perceptions of Serbia and the Balkans, 1903–1906 (Paris: Dialogue, 2000). ANSES at www.anses.rs...
- Slobodan G. Marković, Grof Čedomilj Mijatović. Viktorijanac među Srbima (Count Chedomille Mijatovich. A Victorian among Serbs), Belgrade, Dosije and Belgrade Law School Press, 2006.
- Slobodan G. Marković, Čedomilj Mijatović. A bridge between two Cultures, Chevening Journal, No. 21 (2006), pp. 42–43.
- Predrag Protić, Sumnje i nadanja, Prilozi proučavanju duhovnih kretanja kod Srba i vreme romantizma (Doubts and Hopes. Contribution to the study of ideas among Serbs in the era of Romanticism), Belgrade: Prosveta, 1986.
- Marković Slobodan G. (2007). "Čedomilj Mijatović, a leading Serbian Anglophile" (PDF). Balcanica (38): 105–132. doi:10.2298/BALC0738105M.

Government offices
| Preceded by Marko Lazarević | Minister of Finance of Serbia; 1873–1874 | Succeeded by Ljubomir Kaljević |
| Preceded by Stojan Novaković | Minister of Finance of Serbia; 1875 | Succeeded by Kosta Jovanović |
| Preceded by Vladimir Jovanović | Minister of Finance of Serbia; 1880–1883 | Succeeded by Aleksa Spasić |
| Preceded by Vukašin Petrović | Minister of Finance of Serbia; 1886–1887 | Succeeded by Mihailo V. Vujić |
| Preceded by Mita Rakić | Minister of Finance of Serbia; 1888–1889 | Succeeded by Mihailo V. Vujić |
| Preceded by Đorđe Simić | Minister of Finance of Serbia; 1894 | Succeeded by Vukašin J. Petrović |
| Preceded by Jovan Ristić | Minister of Foreign Affairs of Serbia; 1880–1881 | Succeeded by Milan Piroćanac |
| Preceded by Dragutin Franasović | Minister of Foreign Affairs of Serbia; 1888–1889 | Succeeded by Sava Grujić |
Academic offices
| Preceded by Josif Pančić | President of Serbian Academy of Sciences and Arts; 1888–1889 | Succeeded by Dimitrije Nešić |
