= Milutin Garašanin =

Serbian politician (1843–1898)

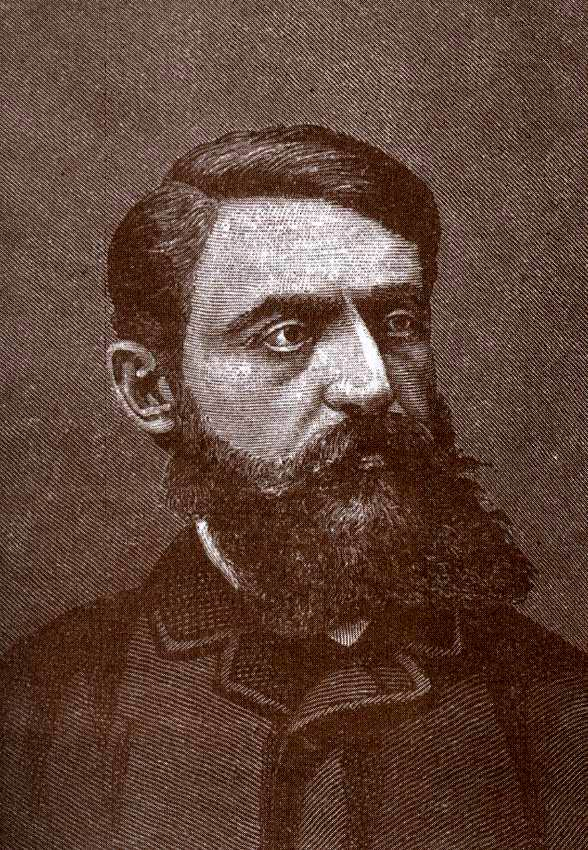

30th Prime Minister of Serbia
- In office 19 February 1884 – 13 June 1887
- Preceded by: Nikola Hristić
- Succeeded by: Jovan Ristić

Minister of Foreign Affairs
- In office 1884–1886
- Preceded by: Milan Bogićević
- Succeeded by: Dragutin Franasović

Minister of Finance
- In office 1884–1885
- Preceded by: Đorđe M. Pavlović
- Succeeded by: Vukašin J. Petrović

Minister of Internal Affairs
- In office 2 November 1880 – 3 October 1883
- Preceded by: Radivoje Milojković
- Succeeded by: Nikola Hristić

Personal details
- Born: 22 February 1843 Belgrade, Serbia
- Died: 5 March 1898 (aged 55) Paris, France
- Party: Serbian Progressive Party
- Occupation: politician, officer, ambassador, author

Milutin Garašanin (Serbian Cyrillic: Милутин Гарашанин; 22 February 1843 – 5 March 1898) was a Serbian politician who held the post of Prime Minister of Serbia, Garašanin also served as President of the National Assembly, Minister of Finance, Internal affairs, Ambassador to France and Ambassador to Austria.

== Biography ==
Garašanin was son of influential politician and twice Prime Minister Ilija Garašanin and went on to finish a prestigious French military school in Metz. Garašanin returned to Serbia and started a business in flour production located on the family estate in Grocka. When Serbian-Turkish Wars (1876–1878) started, Milutin Garašanin took part in the war serving as artillery captain. He was promoted colonel after the war and went to pursue a successful political career, founding the Serbian progressive party and holding a number of important posts.

The Serbian Academy of Sciences and Arts elected Garašanin a full member. Garašanin was considered to be one of the best orators of the Kingdom of Serbia. He was awarded the Order of Prince Danilo I.

== Selected works ==
- Dokolice
- Dva namesništva

Government offices
Preceded by Radivoje Milojković	Minister of Internal Affairs; 1880–1883	Succeeded by Nikola Hristić
Preceded by Đorđe M. Pavlović	Minister of Finance of Serbia; 1884–1885	Succeeded by Vukašin J. Petrović
Preceded by Nikola Hristić	Prime Minister of Serbia; 1884–1887	Succeeded by Jovan Ristić
Preceded by Milan Bogićević	Minister of Foreign Affairs; 1884–1886	Succeeded by Dragutin Franasović
