= Elodie Lawton =

British author

Elodie Lawton Mijatović
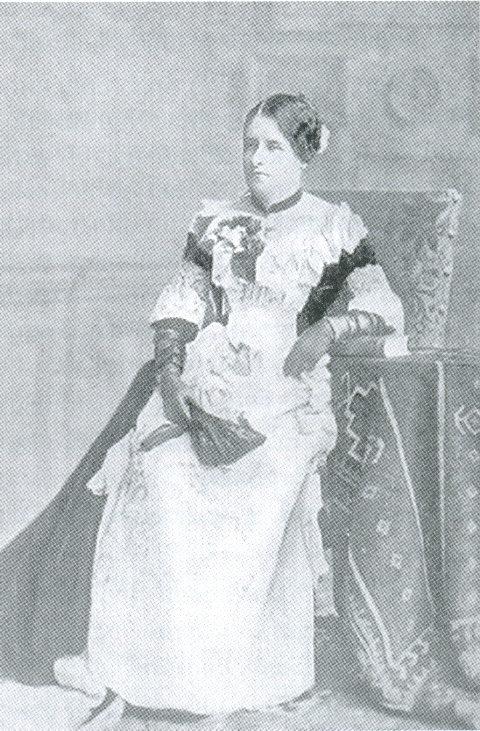
- Born: 1825
- Died: 13 December 1908 (aged 82–83); London, United Kingdom
- Occupations: Writer, translator, abolitionist
- Notable work: Serbian Folk-lore; The History of Modern Serbia
- Spouse: Čedomilj Mijatović

Elodie Lawton Mijatović (also spelled Mijatovics and Mijatovich; 1825 – 13 December 1908) was a British author who lived in Boston in the 1850s, where she was an advocate of the abolitionist movement.

== Biography ==
In 1864 she married Serbian politician, writer and diplomat Čedomilj Mijatović (1842–1932) and lived with him in Belgrade and then in London, where she died.

She translated several works from English into Serbian and published several books on Serbia in English, including The History of Modern Serbia (London: William Tweedie, 1872) and Serbian Folk-lore (London: W. Isbister & Co, 1874). She translated Serbian national songs of the Kosovo cycle into English and tried to organise them into one national ballad: Kossovo: an Attempt to bring Serbian National Songs, about the Fall of the Serbian Empire at the Battle of Kosovo, into one Poem (London: W. Isbister, 1881).
