= Mihailo V. Vujić =

Serbian politician, ambassador, professor, philosopher, historian and academic

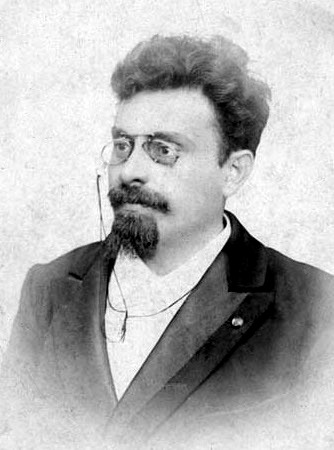
- Born: 26 October 1853; Belgrade, Principality of Serbia
- Died: 1 March 1913 (aged 59); Sušak, Austria-Hungary
- Occupations: politician, ambassador, professor of economics, philosopher, historian and academic

Mihailo V. Vujić (Serbian Cyrillic: Михаило В. Вујић; 26 October 1853 — 1 March 1913) was a Serbian politician, ambassador, professor of economics, philosopher, historian and academic. He was one of the most notable Serbian economists during the latter half of the nineteenth century.

== Biography ==
He completed a gymnasium and received his post-graduate degree in economics at Belgrade's Velika škola. Vujić continued his post-graduate studies in finance, economics and philosophy at the University of Leipzig, where he received a Ph.D. in 1879. Shortly after returning from his studies to Serbia, he joined the moderate wing of the People's Radical Party.

From 1879 to 1887 Vujić taught economics at his alma mater, alongside two other well-known professors, Konstantin Cukić and Čedomilj Mijatović.

He first became Minister of Finance in the liberal-radical government of Jovan Ristić in mid-1887, and at the end of the same year, he transferred to the radical government of Sava Grujić. He was then Minister of Finance in a total of five governments. As Minister of Finance, Vujić eliminated the monopoly of tobacco and salt and put a stop to the exploitation of the Serbian railway system, which until then had been in the hands of foreign companies. He sorted out the finances of the state, bringing the budget from large deficits to balancing the books by 1891. He tried to convert all of Serbia's foreign loans to reduce the burden of repayment.

After King Alexander Obrenović's controversial marriage to Draga Mašin, Vujić became an ambassador in Paris. Already in February 1901, Vujić was Foreign Minister in the government of Aleksa Jovanović, and shortly thereafter (March 20, 1901) he formed his own government and the portfolio of the Foreign Minister. This government was a coalition of forward-radicals and other parties. The reconciliation of Vujić and other moderate radicals caused a split in the Radical Party, from which the younger and more combative elements stood out and formed a new party of Independent Radicals. Vujić's government fell on 7 November 1902.

In the following years, Vujić was Serbia's ambassador in Vienna in 1903, Berlin in 1906 and Rome in 1909.

Vujić was elected a full member of the Serbian Royal Academy in 1901.

== Works ==
Mihailo V. Vujić is best known for his first scientific treatise of Benedetto Cotrugli's "About Commerce and the Perfect Merchant", a lively account of the life of a Ragusian merchant in the Early Renaissance. Cotrugli gave an early description of the double-entry bookkeeping system. Vujić's translation is a scholarly analysis of Kotruljević's work that places the four books into its proper historical context, making it an important contribution to our understanding of the origins of management and trade practices in the eastern shores of the Adriatic Sea during 15th century Ragusa.

In philosophy, he belonged to the Kantian direction.

Vujić also wrote and published:

- Načela narodne ekonomije: Osnovna pethodna pitanja
- Istorijski razvitak nauke o narodnoj privredi, Book I (1895)
- Ekonomo-politički pogledi Dubrovčanina Nikole Vida Gucetica iz druge polovine 16-tog. veka (1900)
- Naša ekonomna politika

== See also ==
- Đorđe Simić

Government offices
Preceded by Čedomilj Mijatović	Minister of Finance of Serbia; 1887–1888	Succeeded by Mita Rakić
Preceded by Čedomilj Mijatović	Minister of Finance of Serbia; 1889–1891	Succeeded by Nikola Pašić
Preceded by Dimitrije Stojanović	Minister of Finance of Serbia; 1893–1894	Succeeded by Đorđe Simić
Preceded by Stevan D. Popović	Minister of Finance of Serbia; 1896–1897	Succeeded by Stevan D. Popović
Preceded by Aleksa Jovanović	Prime Minister of Serbia; 1901–1902	Succeeded by Petar Velimirović
Preceded by Aleksa Jovanović	Minister of Foreign Affairs of Serbia; 1901–1902	Succeeded by Vasilije Antonić
