= Aleksa Jovanović (politician) =

Serbian judge and politician (1846–1920)

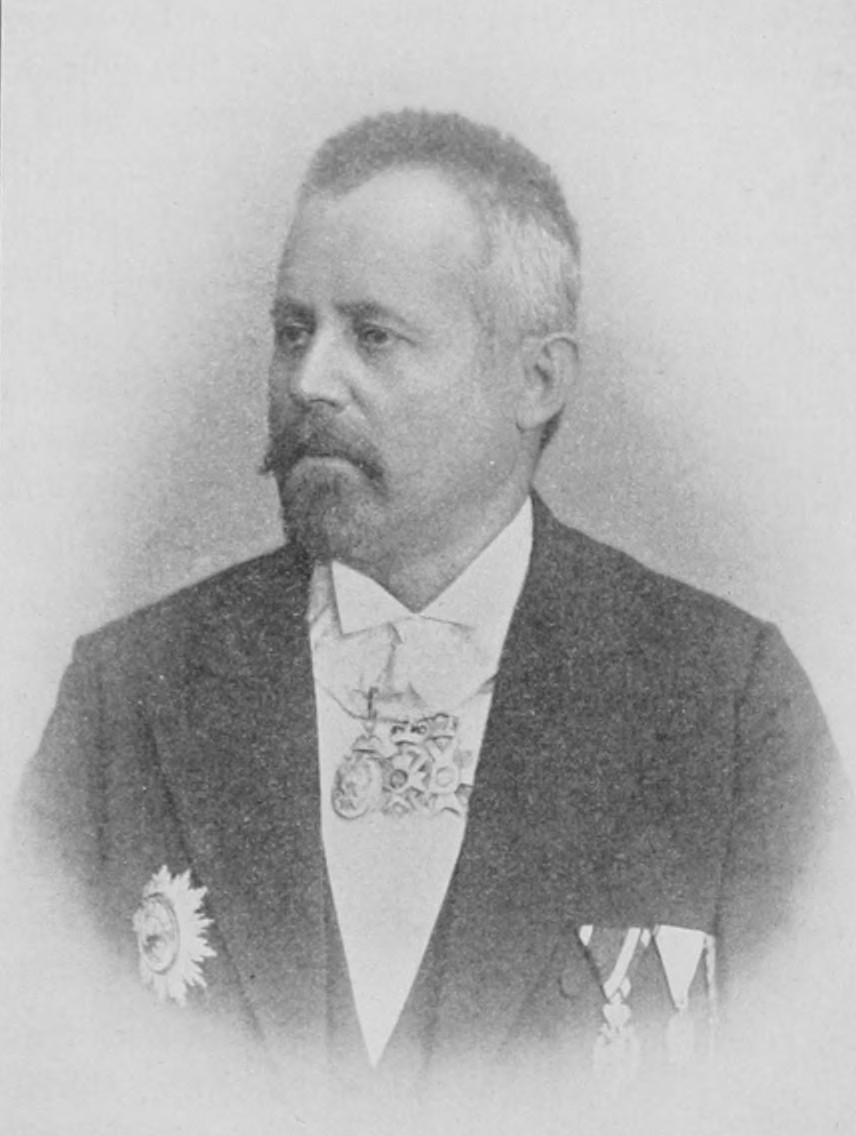
- Born: 19 August 1846; Ćuprija, Principality of Serbia
- Died: 6 May 1920 (aged 73); Belgrade, Kingdom of Yugoslavia
- Occupations: politician, judge

Aleksa Jovanović (Serbian Cyrillic: Алекса Јовановић; 19 August 1846 – 6 May 1920) was a Serbian judge and politician who held the post of Prime Minister of Serbia and Minister of Foreign Affairs.

He was awarded Order of the White Eagle.

== Selected works ==
- Istorijski razvitak srpske zadruge (1896)
- Izborno pravo ženskinja u Kraljevini Srbiji (1898)
- Prinosci za istoriju srpskog prava (1900)
- Ministarstvo Alekse Jovanovića (1906).

Government offices
Preceded by Vladan Đorđević	Prime Minister of Serbia; 1900–1901	Succeeded by Mihailo V. Vujić
Preceded by Vladan Đorđević	Minister of Foreign Affairs; 1884–1886	Succeeded by Mihailo V. Vujić
