= Serbian Progressive Party (Kingdom of Serbia) =

Conservative-liberal political party in the Kingdom of Serbia

Serbian Progressive Party Српска напредна странка
- Leader: Čedomilj Mijatović; Milan Piroćanac; Milutin Garašanin
- Founded: 1881
- Dissolved: 1919
- Merged into: Democratic Party
- Headquarters: Belgrade
- Ideology: Conservative liberalism Classical liberalism Austrophilia
- Political position: Centre

The Serbian Progressive Party (Serbian: Српска напредна странка, romanized: Srpska napredna stranka; abbr. СНС or SNS) was a conservative liberal political party in the Kingdom of Serbia that existed from 1881 to 1919.

== History ==
=== Origins ===
The origin of the Progressive Party can be traced back to 1871. Their leadership mainly consisted of young Western-trained intellectuals who later took part in the Editorial Board of Serbian journal Videlo. This journal was established in January 1880 as an organ of political opposition against the government of Jovan Ristić, in power from October 1878 until November 3, 1880. In the first issue, Stojan Novaković declared: "The younger and generally more active forces of the former so-called conservative party united with the younger forces of the so-called liberal party around a program, the main part of which will be the fight against pseudo-liberalism and sincere work for the promotion of modern, truly liberal public foundations."

The journal advocated freedom of speech, freedom of associations, full personal protection and protection of property rights, constitutional responsibility of cabinet ministers, access of experts to the National Assembly, full independence of the Judiciary, and autonomy of municipalities. In the field of foreign policy, the Progressive Party was not inclined to Russia contrary to the other two political parties in Serbia. It rather advocated close relations with Austria-Hungary. In the economy, the party advocated completely liberal reforms. In terms of political ideologies, the party was what may be termed as Serbian Whiggism. Occasionally faced to choose between democracy and various freedoms the progressivists were prone to advocate and enforce freedoms. This made them too closely tied to the ruler and quickly diminished their popularity among the electorate. Nonetheless, they encouraged and paved the way for the modernization of Serbia by introducing modern institutions and progressive laws.

=== The 1880s ===
The Progressive Party was founded in January 1881. It did not have a clear leader but was rather headed by a quartet consisting of: Milan Piroćanac, Milutin Garašanin, Stojan Novaković and Čedomilj Mijatović. The party was in power in the 1880s and was openly favored by Prince/King Milan Obrenović. Party’s opponents viewed the progressivists as a personal party of the king.

The party advocated freedom of speech, freedom of associations, full personal protection and protection of property rights, constitutional responsibility of cabinet ministers, access of experts to the National Assembly, full independence of the Judiciary, autonomy of municipalities and free market economy. In the field of foreign policy the Progressive Party was not inclined to Russia contrary to the other two political parties in Serbia. It rather advocated close relations with Austria-Hungary. Occasionally faced to choose between democracy and various freedoms the progressivists were prone to advocate and enforce freedoms. This made them too closely tied to the ruler and quickly diminished their popularity among the electorate. Nonetheless, they encouraged and paved the way for the modernization of Serbia by introducing modern institutions and progressive laws.

The first progressivist government was led by Milan Piroćanac from November 2, 1880, until October 3, 1883. In that period he was an unofficial leader of the party. The next Progressivist Government was formed in February 1884 by Milutin Garašanin who thus became a new party leader. He formed three successive but short governments (February 19, 1884 – June 13, 1887). Afterward, the Progressive party was subjected to serious persecutions by its rivals in 1887, and in 1889 after the abdication of King Milan Obrenović. Since Serbia had almost universal male suffrage since 1869, the Progressivists could not win any free elections since their electoral base was only in few towns and the total Serbian urban population was 1900 around 14%. Their victory in 1884 was achieved due to the previous state of emergency introduced to suppress the Timok Rebellion in October/November 1883. In the late 1880s the Progressive party lost its position in Serbia and it never fully recovered.

=== Decline ===
The new Serbian king Aleksandar Obrenović succeeded his father in 1889 but was not of legal age and therefore a Regency was established headed by Jovan Ristić. In 1894 king Alexander staged a coup and took all power. Afterward, he occasionally used Progressivist politicians to fill in places in subsequent governments. However, by the time of the death of Milutin Garašanin in 1898, the party ceased to exist in organizational terms.

It was renewed in 1906 and was headed by Stojan Novaković. It remained a small party that played an important role during the Annexation Crisis (1908–1909). After the World War I, the party merged into the Democratic Party.

== Progressive Prime Ministers ==
Prime Minister of Serbia	Years
Jovan Marinović	1873–1874
Aćim Čumić	1874–1875
Ljubomir Kaljević	1875–1876
Milan Piroćanac	1880–1883
Milutin Garašanin	1884–1887
Stojan Novaković	1885–1886; 1909
Vladan Đorđević	1897–1900

== See also ==
- Serbian Progressive Party politicians
