= Vasilije Antonić =

Serbian military officer, diplomat and politician

- Василије Антонић
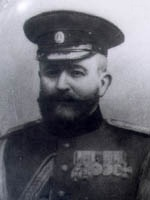

Minister of Foreign Affairs of Serbia
- In office 1902–1903
- Monarch: Milan of Serbia
- Preceded by: Mihailo Vujić
- Succeeded by: Sima Lozanić

Personal details
- Born: 12 April 1860 Rudnik (Gornji Milanovac), Principality of Serbia
- Died: 26 June 1929 (aged 69) Belgrade, Kingdom of Serbs, Croats and Slovenes
- Education: Military Academy in Belgrade
- Occupation: Politician, judge, university professor

Vasilije Antonić (Serbian: Василије Антонић; 1860–1929) was a Serbian army officer, diplomat and politician. After finishing the Military Academy in Belgrade as the second in class he went on to serve on a number of public offices and posts, including the Minister of Foreign Affairs and the Minister of Defence. As a Minister of Defence he initiated several reforms and introduced new modern equipment for the Serbian Army.

Government offices
| Preceded by Mihailo Vujić | Minister of Foreign Affairs of Serbia; 1902–1903 | Succeeded by Sima Lozanić |
| Preceded by Jovan Žujović | Minister of Foreign Affairs of Serbia; 1906 | Succeeded by Nikola Pašić |
| Preceded by Čedomilj Miljković | Minister of Defence of Serbia; 1901–1902 | Succeeded by Milovan S. Pavlović |
| Preceded by Radomir Putnik | Minister of Defence of Serbia; 1905–1906 | Succeeded by Sava Grujić |
