= Pavle Denić =

Serbian engineer, professor, diplomat and politician

Pavle Denić Павле Денић

Minister of Foreign Affairs
- In office 23 March 1903 – 29 May 1903
- Monarch: Alexander I
- Prime Minister: Dimitrije Cincar-Marković
- Preceded by: Sima Lozanić
- Succeeded by: Ljubomir Kaljević

Minister of Construction
- In office 19 November 1902 – 29 May 1903
- Monarchs: Alexander I Peter I

Personal details
- Born: 16 April 1855 Belgrade, Principality of Serbia
- Died: 3 January 1939 (aged 83) Belgrade, Kingdom of Yugoslavia
- Party: Independent
- Occupation: Engineer; professor; politician; diplomat

Pavle Denić (Serbian: Павле Денић; 16 April 1855 – 3 January 1939) was a Serbian engineer, professor, diplomat and politician who served as the Minister of Foreign Affairs in 1903 and as the Minister of Construction between 1902 and 1903.

== Biography ==
Pavle Denić was born on 16 April 1855 in Belgrade. He was the nephew of general Jovan Belimarković and was a member of a popular clan called Baba-Dudići. He graduated from the Military Academy in 1875 as the second in rank. Immediately after that, he participated in the First Serbian-Turkish war in the battles on the Morava in 1876.

He was appointed as the Minister of Construction in the government of Dimitrije Cincar-Marković and he served that role from 12 November 1902 until the May Coup. After the departure of Sima Lozanić he was appointed as the Minister of Foreign Affairs because of his knowledge of French language. During the May Coup, the conspirators were looking for Denić with the intention to liquidate him. After the coup, he retired from political life and in 1939 he died at the age of 83.

Denić was married to Vasilija Pašona, daughter of the Belgrade merchant Janja Pašona. They had one daughter, Zora married Životić, and laa granddaughter Pava Životić, who has no children.

Government offices
Preceded by Sima Lozanić	Minister of Foreign Affairs; 1903	Succeeded by Ljubomir Kaljević
