= Branko Mikašinović (politician) =

Yugoslav and Serbian diplomat and politician

Branko Mikašinović (Serbian Cyrillic: Бранко Микашиновић; 1924–1999), was a Yugoslav and Serbian diplomat and politician who held the office of Serbian Minister of Foreign Affairs in the 90s.
