= Đorđe Simić =

Serbian politician and diplomat

Đorđe Simić Ђорђе Симић
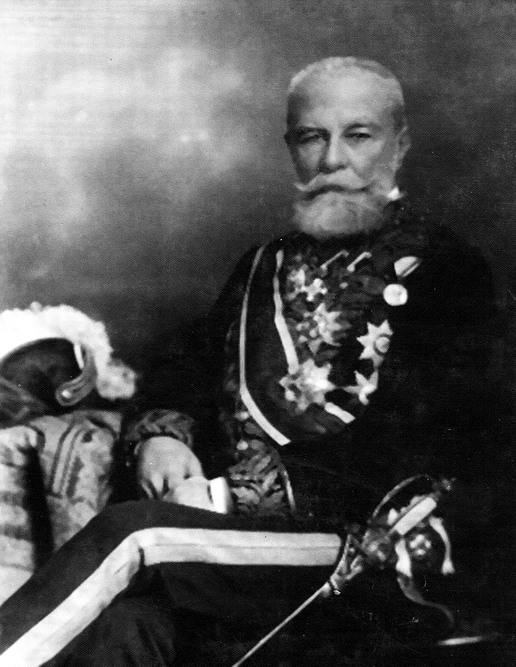

President of the Government of Serbia
- In office 24 January 1894 – 3 April 1894
- Monarch: Alexander I
- Preceded by: Sava Grujić
- Succeeded by: Svetomir Nikolajević

President of the Government of Serbia
- In office 27 December 1896 – 19 October 1897
- Monarch: Alexander I
- Preceded by: Stojan Novaković
- Succeeded by: Vladan Đorđević

Personal details
- Born: 28 February 1843 Belgrade, Serbia
- Died: 11 October 1921 (aged 78) Zemun, Kingdom of Serbs, Croats and Slovenes
- Party: People's Radical Party
- Spouse: Princess Jelena Karadjordjevic

Đorđe S. Simić (28 February 1843, in Belgrade – 11 October 1921, in Zemun), was a Serbian politician and diplomat. He was twice Prime Minister of the Kingdom of Serbia.

== Biography ==
Đorđe S. Simić was the son of Stojan Simić and the nephew of Aleksa Simić, both Serbian politicians. Upon graduation in Belgrade, he studied the state sciences in Berlin, Heidelberg and Paris.

He was hired as a civil servant at the Ministry of Foreign Affairs of Serbia and was head of its political department from 1867 to 1882. From 1882 to 1884 was Consul-General in Sofia, from 1887 to 1890 Serbian Minister to St. Petersburg and from 1890 to 1894 Serbian Minister in Vienna.

Đorđe S. Simić was the Prime Minister of Serbia for the first time from 12 January to 21 March 1894. The government quickly came to a crisis and fall due to the King Aleksandar I, demanding the Simić cabinet to fight the People's Radical Party, which Simić and several other ministers refused to accept.

Simić was again the Serbian envoy in Vienna from 1894 to 1896. He was the Prime Minister for the second time (and also Minister of Foreign Affairs) from 17 December 1896 to 11 October 1897. This government was composed of neutral politicians and radicals. In foreign policy, Simić's second cabinet achieved only partial results in Macedonia; Serbia obtained the right to establish schools in the Serbian language, and a Serbian bishop was temporarily installed in Skopje. In internal politics, the government improved finances and armament of the Serbian Army after the threats to the regional security provoked by the Greco-Turkish War of 1897.

in 1900, Simić was appointed as the Serbian Minister in Rome, then he was Senator and President of the State Council in 1901, permanent Extraordinary Minister Plenipotentiary (ambassador) to Istanbul from 1903 to 1906, and again in Vienna from 1906 to 1912.

One of the founders of Red Cross in Serbia, Simić was its longtime president.

Simić was married, in 1867, to Princess Jelena Karadjordjevic (18 October 1846 – 26 July 1867), daughter of Alexander, Prince of Serbia.

== Work ==
Đorđe S. Simić translated in 1883 the capital work of Benjamin Constant -- Principes de Politique Applicable a Tous Les Gouvernements—on the principles of the political and ministerial responsibilities, considered a reference work by the elite of the Radical deputies.

== See also ==
- List of prime ministers of Serbia

== Bibliography ==
- Ana Stolić, Đorđe Simić. Poslednji srpski diplomata XIX veka, Istorijski Institut, Beograd 2003.

Government offices
| Preceded by Sava Grujić | Prime Minister of Serbia; 1894 | Succeeded by Svetomir Nikolajević |
| Preceded by Mihailo V. Vujić | Minister of Finance of Serbia; 1894 | Succeeded by Čedomilj Mijatović |
| Preceded by Stojan Novaković | Prime Minister of Serbia; 1896–1897 | Succeeded by Vladan Đorđević |
| Preceded by Sava Grujić | Minister of Foreign Affairs; 1894 | Succeeded by Sima Lozanić |
| Preceded by Stojan Novaković | Minister of Foreign Affairs; 1896–1897 | Succeeded by Vladan Đorđević |
