= Vladan Đorđević =

Serbian politician, diplomat, physician and writer (1844–1930)

Vladan Đorđević Владан Ђорђевић
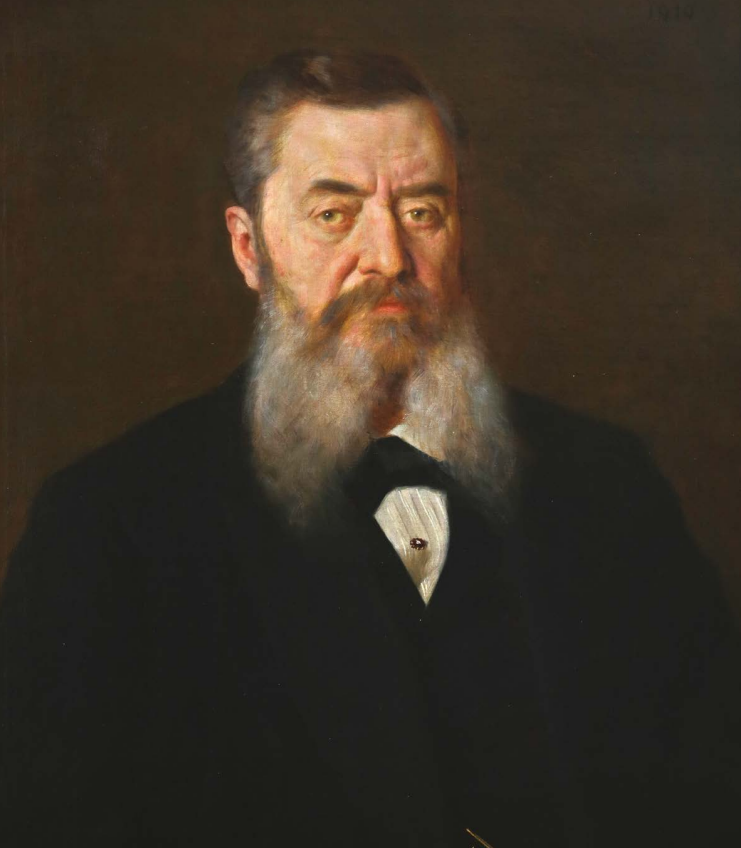

Prime Minister of Serbia
- In office 11 October 1897 – 12 July 1900
- Monarch: Alexander I
- Preceded by: Đorđe Simić
- Succeeded by: Aleksa Jovanović

Personal details
- Born: 21 November 1844 Belgrade, Principality of Serbia
- Died: 31 August 1930 (aged 85) Baden bei Wien, Austria
- Party: Serbian Progressive Party
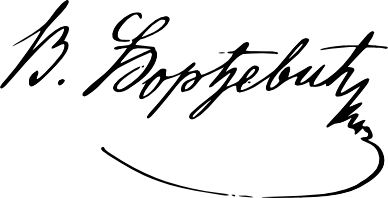
- Signature

Ipokrat "Vladan" Đorđević (pronounced [ʋlǎːdan d͡ʑɔ̝̌ːrd͡ʑe̞vit͡ɕ], Serbian Cyrillic: Владан Ђорђевић, 21 November 1844 – 31 August 1930) was a Serbian politician, diplomat, physician, writer, and organizer of the State Sanitary Service. He held the post of mayor of Belgrade, Minister of Education, Prime Minister of Serbia, Minister of Foreign Affairs and Envoy to Athens and Istanbul.

== Early life ==
Ipokrat Đorđević (Ипократ Ђорђевић) was born in Belgrade, the son of pharmacist Đorđe Đorđević and Marija (née Leko). Both of his parents were Aromanians. He had two siblings. He was named Ipokrat after Hippocrates, by his godfather Kosta German. He later changed his name to Vladan, which had been his pen name, upon the suggestion of his professor at the Lyceum, Đuro Daničić, who Serbianized many names of his students.

His father came from a family that had long been established in Serbia. Vladan Đorđević's mother died when he was only seven years old, but his father brought him up in Sarajevo, where he moved to open a pharmacy. Vladan received an early Serbian education in Sarajevo, where he already showed a strong taste for natural history. For his work Kočina krajina while attending the Sarajevo Lycee he received a prize from the Matica Srpska in recognition of his historical monograph. Đorđević attended the Panslavist Congress at Moscow in 1867, and spoke against the idea of linguistic unity.

== Medical career ==
The medical profession having been selected for him, he began his studies at the prestigious University of Vienna's School of Medicine with a stipend from the Serbian government. While on a scholarship in Vienna he exposed the evils of Austrian rule and consequently had his scholarship taken away from him. A chance meeting with Prince Mihailo Obrenović in Vienna who sympathized with Đorđević, resulted in his scholarship being returned. After graduating as a surgeon he volunteered his services in the Franco-Prussian War. After the conflict, he came back to Belgrade where he made a name for himself as a competent physician. He received the rank of major and chief medical officer in the Serbian Army.

During the Serbian-Ottoman wars of 1876 and 1877-78, he tried to implement Prussian practice of medicine, thus founding the Red Cross of Serbia. In 1879 he was in charge of Serbian Kingdom's health sector and one of the first physicians to work on public health within the state administration, obtained parliamentary support for a law on the establishment of a national health fund. By securing financing for the health service, Đorđević not only ensured its creation but also received official recognition for hygiene being a public good that should be advanced by means of state contributions. In 1880 he married his Viennese sweetheart Paulina, who bore him fifteen children. He was the principal founder of the Serbian Red Cross, the Royal College of Physicians, and its organ, Arhiv, to which he contributed several papers of marked ability. He also led the Progressive Party with Milutin Garašanin, the son of Ilija Garašanin.

== Political career ==
=== Mayor of Belgrade ===
Đorđević served as mayor of Belgrade from 1884 to 1885. When he took over, Belgrade had 4420 houses and buildings and a population of 35,783.

Upon taking the office, he "chased away bureaucrats and protectionists", arranged the quay along the Sava bank and introduced street lanterns. In 1880, the administration introduced the new city tax (trošarina), intended to be used for the construction of waterworks, sewage, schools, cobblestone pavement, etc. A special municipal commission was sent to London, UK, and to other European cities, to check how the communal matters are resolved there. Đorđević decided to use the tax for setting the foundations of the municipal solid waste collecting system. He regulated the disposal of the garbage from private houses and organized "cleaning troops" within the Fire department. In order to make the garbage collecting operational, Đorđević ordered the purchase of carts, one for each quarter of the city, 14 oxen, 13 employees and organized the administrative service. Due to the cholera outbreaks and his medical background, Đorđević envisioned the system primarily for the sanitation and health reasons, thus as a non-profit enterprise so the fee paid by the citizens was symbolic.

As Belgrade expanded, the city’s old cemetery in the neighbourhood of Tašmajdan became inadequate. It became too small to function as Belgrade’s main graveyard and, once being located on the outskirts of the city, as Belgrade grew, Tašmajdan became downtown, close to the Royal court. The city was in financial distress and a large lot for the new cemetery couldn't be purchased, so Đorđević donated a patch of his own land so that new cemetery could be established. In the next decades, the area, including the graveyard itself, was known as "Vladanovac", after Đorđević, but was gradually replaced with the name New Cemetery.

=== Prime minister ===
In 1894 he retired from his position and went to live in Paris. No sooner had he arrived when he was called back to Belgrade and made an envoy to Constantinople.

Vladan Đorđević's years as prime minister (1897–1900) were defined by authoritarianism. His regime has been described as one of "order and labour", Red i Rad (Discipline and Labor).

During his stay in Belgrade, he proclaimed martial law, and carried out his measures of reform with unrelenting sternness, banishing from the town anyone who attempted resistance or stood in his way. When all the reforms were made, he was removed from his post as Mayor of Belgrade. Đorđević fell afoul with the authorities afterwards. He was accused in 1906 of giving out government secrets in his book Kraj jedne dinastije: prolozi za istoriju Srbije (The End of a Dynasty: Contributions to the History of Serbia, 3 vols., Belgrade, 1905, 1906), and convicted to six months in prison. He served his sentence in the Belgrade city jail.

== Legacy ==
Đorđević kept up his interest in literary and historical matters by an extensive correspondence, and his home at Belgrade was the centre of a distinguished literary circle. With friends and colleagues he helped found a new journal, Otadžbina, in which some of his earlier writings, mainly practical hygiene and economic subjects, were published.

Đorđević was made major in the Serbian Army and after a short period, he gave up his commission. In the 1880s, he became a member of the council, in which capacity he distinguished himself by his ability in financial affairs, and his zeal in social reform.

He published an extensive account of the Serbo-Bulgarian War in the two-volume Istorija Srpsko-Bugarskog rata 1885 in 1908.

Đorđević was awarded Order of Saint Sava, Order of the Cross of Takovo and is included in The 100 most prominent Serbs.

An exhibit at the Gallery of the Serbian Academy of Sciences and Arts titled "A portrait of a tireless creator" was opened in November 2020. During the exhibit, Đorđević's autobiography Memories (2500 pages) was presented to the public for the first time.

== Works ==
- Otadžbina (Fatherland), Beograd: Štamparija kraljevine srpske, 1890
- Srbija na Berlinskom Kongresu, Beograd: Štamparija kraljevine srpske, 1890
- Grčka i srpska prosveta, Srpska kraljevska akademija, 1896
- Kraj jedne dinastije: 1899–1900, Štamparija D. Dimitrijevića, 1906
- Moja odbrana pred sudom (My defense before the court), Beograd: Narodna štamparija, 1906
- Srpsko-turski rat: uspomene i beleške iz 1876, 1877 i 1878 godine, Volume 1, Izdanje Ignjata Daničića, 1907
- Istorija srpsko-bugarskog rata 1885: Od Slivnice do Pirota, Nova štamparija "Davidović", 1908
- Evropa i Crna Gora, Sv. Sava, 1912
- Evropa i Balkan: Evropa i Rumunija, Sv. Sava, 1911
- Arnauti i velike sile, Izdavač trgovina Jevte M. Parlovića i kompanija, 1913
- Mladi kralj, Štamparija kraljevine srbije, 1913
- Car Dušan: istorijski roman iz XIV-oga veka, Volumes I-III, Naklada Hrvatskog štamparskog zavoda, 1920
- Golgota: silazak sa prestola, Beograd, 1933

== See also ==
- Jovan Cvijić
- Jovan Hadži-Vasiljević
- Vladimir Karić
- Zarija Popović
- Ami Boué
- Alexander Hilferding

== Books ==
- Kanjuh, Vladimir; Čolović, Radoje; Radojević, Mira; Delić, Jovan, eds. (2020). Vladan Đorđević : on the occasion of the 176th anniversary of his birth (PDF). Serbian Academy of Sciences and Arts. ISBN 978-86-7025-888-4.

== Bibliography ==
- Сузана Рајић, Владан Ђорђевић. Биографија поузданог обреновићевца, Београд 2007.

Government offices
Preceded by Gliša Geršić	Minister of Education of Serbia; 1888–1889	Succeeded by Svetislav Milosavljević
Preceded by Đorđe Simić	Prime Minister of Serbia; 1897–1900	Succeeded by Aleksa Jovanović
Preceded by Đorđe Simić	Minister of Foreign Affairs; 1897–1900	Succeeded by Aleksa Jovanović
