= Mita Rakić =

Serbian economist and writer (1846–1890)

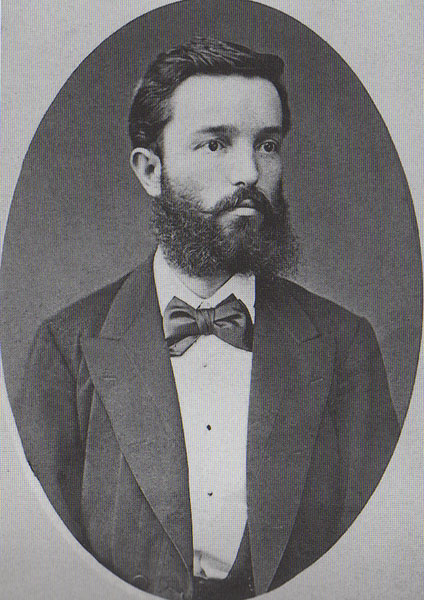
Portrait of Mita Rakić

Dimitrije "Mita" Rakić (15/27 October 1846 – 17 March 1890) was a Serbian writer, historian, politician, translator, philosopher, diplomat and economist. He pursued a philosophy of social mechanism as an administrator for the Ministry of Finance. He is the father of poet Milan Rakić.

== Life ==
Rakić was born on the 15 of October (Old Style) or 27 October (Gregorian Calendar) 1846 into a prominent military family in Mionica, Principality of Serbia. Literature and culture were abiding passions in the family. He studied at the Velika škola in Belgrade and later went abroad to pursue further studies in economics in Munich, Zürich, Göttingen, and London. Upon his return to Serbia he was one of the founders of the political magazine Videlo which became quite influential.

== Death ==
Rakić died on 17 March 1890 in Belgrade, at the age of 43.

== Career and publications ==
Rakić became the administrator of the Ministry of Finance but was fired in June 1880 after a disagreement with Vladimir Jovanović. This incident became controversial after Videlo responded by publishing Rakić's account of the dismissal and the reprinting of Jovanovic liberal articles during the 1860s.

He translated the works of major foreign writers, like Victor Hugo's Les Misérables; Michał Czajkowski's Cossack Tales; John William Draper's History of the Intellectual Development of Europe; and works by Ludwig Feuerbach.

From 1868 to 1876 he edited Škola (School), a tri-monthly scholastic journal. He was a voluminous writer on educational subjects and was the author of various school-textbooks. He authored 100 books, including several novels, and published hundreds of studies, papers, monographs, and learned articles. Among his pedagogical textbooks were: Schools in Serbia (1868); A Study Guide (1869); Pedagogical Studies (1870); School Hygiene (1870); History of Pedagogy (1871); School Discipline (1871); Adolph Diesterweg (1871); Schools for the Rights of Citizens and Responsibilities (1873). The Byzantine imperial city on the slopes of the Radan mountain in the municipality of Lebane was discovered because of Rakić's writings.

In 1881 he received the Order of the Takovo Cross and other equally prestigious awards.
