= Ljubomir Kaljević =

Serbian politician and academic

Ljubomir Kaljević Љубомир Каљевић
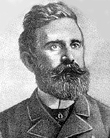

President of the Ministry of Serbia
- In office 8 October 1875 – 6 May 1876
- Monarch: Milan I
- Preceded by: Stevča Mihailović
- Succeeded by: Stevča Mihailović

Personal details
- Born: 1841 Užice, Serbia
- Died: 20 March 1907 (aged 65–66) Belgrade, Serbia
- Party: Serbian Progressive Party

Ljubomir Kaljević (1841, Užice – March 20, 1907, Belgrade) was a Serbian politician and academic who served as the Prime Minister of Serbia.

== Biography ==
Kaljević completed Gymnasium in Belgrade and studied the state sciences in Heidelberg and Paris. Upon his return to Serbia he published from 1867 to 1870 newspaper Serbia, the only opposition newspaper to Prince Mihailo Obrenović around which gathered all the liberal intelligentsia. Kaljević was first elected as a member of parliament in 1871. He began to publish political newspaper Future in 1873. He was Minister of Finance from 25 November 1874 to 20 January 1875.

Kaljević was Prime Minister and Minister of Internal Affairs from 26 September 1875 to 24 April 1876. The government, composed of young liberals and conservatives, prepared the Serbian-Turkish Wars (1876-1878), and issued liberal laws about press and municipalities.

Later he was head of the Ministry of Finance, was one of the founders of the Serbian Progressive Party in 1881, Ambassador in Bucharest from 1881 to 1886, and in Athens from 1886 to 1889, state advisor from 1895 to 1907, Vice President of the Senate in 1901.

As a supporter of the House of Karađorđević, Kaljević became Minister of Foreign Affairs in the cabinet formed after the coup d'etat on 11 June 1903 and the assassination of King Aleksandar Obrenović. He remained in office until 21 September 1903.

== Books ==
Kaljević wrote the book Moje uspomene (My memories) (1908).

== See also ==
- List of prime ministers of Serbia

Government offices
Preceded by Čedomilj Mijatović	Minister of Finance of Serbia; 1874–1875	Succeeded by Stojan Novaković
Preceded by Stevča Mihailović	Prime Minister of Serbia; 1875–1876	Succeeded by Stevča Mihailović
Preceded by Pavle Denić	Minister of Foreign Affairs; 1903	Succeeded by Andra Nikolić
