= Jovan Ristić =

Serbian politician, diplomat and historian (1831–1899)

Jovan Ristić Јован Ристић
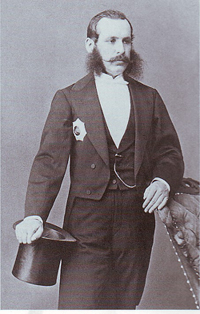

President of the Ministry of Serbia
- In office 15 November 1867 – 3 December 1867
- Monarch: Michael I
- Preceded by: Ilija Garašanin
- Succeeded by: Nikola Hristić
- In office 5 April 1873 – 3 November 1873
- Monarch: Milan I
- Preceded by: Milivoje Petrović Blaznavac
- Succeeded by: Jovan Marinović
- In office 13 October 1878 – 2 November 1880
- Preceded by: Stevča Mihailović
- Succeeded by: Milan Piroćanac
- In office 13 June 1887 – 1 January 1888
- Monarch: Alexander I
- Preceded by: Milutin Garašanin
- Succeeded by: Sava Grujić

Personal details
- Born: January 16, 1831 Kragujevac, Principality of Serbia
- Died: September 4, 1899 (aged 68) Belgrade, Kingdom of Serbia
- Party: Liberal Party
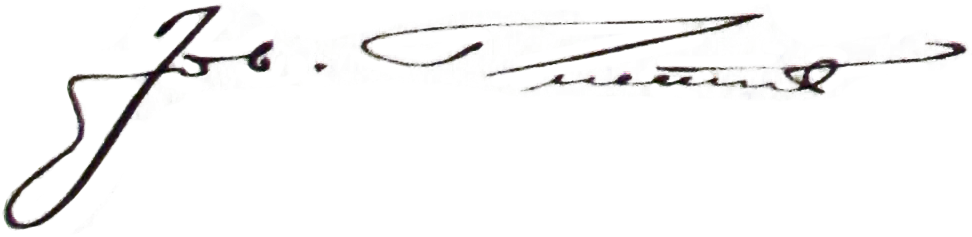
- Signature

Jovan Ristić (Serbian Cyrillic: Јован Ристић; 16 January 1831 – 4 September 1899) was a Serbian politician, diplomat and historian.

== Biography ==
Ristić was born in Kragujevac in a poor family where he attended elementary school. In 1842 he entered high school in Belgrade, and in 1847 the lyceum, where he studied until spring of 1849. As a high school student, Ristić participated in the Serbian movement in Hungary in 1848. He went to study in Germany as a state cadet, where he was s student at the University of Berlin under historian Leopold von Ranke. In 1852 Ristić obtained a doctorate degree from Heidelberg University, after which he went to Paris in where he was until 1854, studying French and attending courses at the Sorbonne University and examining old Serbian manuscripts at the National Library of France upon the invitation of the Society of Serbian Literature. Upon his return to Belgrade Ristić failed to obtain a professorship at Belgrade's Grandes écoles, he received a position in the Ministry of Education, from where he was later transferred to the Ministry of Foreign Affairs, and then to the Ministry of Internal Affairs, where he held various positions from a protocol clerk to a department head.

== Diplomatic and political career ==
He was appointed in 1861 Serbian diplomatic agent at Constantinople. On his return from Constantinople, his brilliant intellectual qualities attracted the attention of the government. He soon became known as the most competent of the government officials. He was immediately offered a ministerial post by Prince Mihailo, who described him as his "right arm", but declined office, being opposed to the reactionary methods adopted by the prince's government. He had already become the recognized leader of the Liberal Party. As a politician, he saw all the dangers that would have to be faced should Serbia embark on a policy of land redemption. The Turkish army, always a formidable fighting force, would overwhelm the Serbs, if it could be wholly massed against them. A Serbian invasion of the rebellious provinces would also, if successful, mean a conflict with Austria-Hungary, in which Russia would probably not interfere, while France was then in no condition to support other nations' plights for freedom. Ristić's reputation was enhanced by the series of negotiations which ended in the peaceful withdrawal of the Turkish troops from the Serbian fortresses in 1867. After the assassination of Prince Mihailo in 1868, he was nominated member of the council of regency, and on 2 January 1869 the third Serbian constitution, which was mainly his creation, was promulgated. When the regency came to an end, and Prince Milan attained his majority in 1872, Ristić became foreign minister; a few months later he was appointed prime minister, but resigned in the following autumn (1873). Later, Old Serbia broke into rebellion, and this was followed by a similar movement in Bulgaria. Ristić again became prime minister in April 1876, and was faced with a dilemma. If Serbia could only act quickly and establish herself in Bosnia-Herzegovina and Old Serbia, it would take time to dislodge her, and meanwhile the example of insurrection would probably spread far and wide over the whole of Turkey in Europe. Also Ristić, Stevča Mihailović, Ilija Garašanin, Nikola Hristić, Miloje Lješanin, Ljubomir Kaljević, Milivoje Petrović Blaznavac, Jovan Marinović, Milan Piroćanac, Sava Grujić, and other distinguished Serbian statesmen have been taught by long experience that with the Powers nothing succeeds like self-help. Possession is nine points of the law. Ristić was able to deduct, if Serbia could maintain a position, however precarious, in the unredeemed Serbian lands, the Serbs could look forward with confidence to being ultimately supported by Russia. Ristić therefore decided to act, and all Serbia was behind him. In that way he gained an international reputation as foreign minister on two important occasions (while prosecuting two wars against Turkey: July 1876; and March 1877 and December 1877; March 1878) by promoting an expansionist policy that he hoped would make Serbia the nucleus for a strong South Slav state.

At the Congress of Berlin Ristić labored with some success to obtain greater advantages for Serbia than had been accorded to her by the Treaty of San Stefano. His personal secretary at the congress was poet and attorney Laza Kostić. The provisions of the Treaty of Berlin provided Serbia with no more than 3,860 square miles (10,000 km^{2}) of new territory and a proclamation of complete independence from Turkey. This, however, disappointed the Serbians, owing to the obstacles now raised to the realization of the national program. The Ristić government became unpopular. He was forced to resign when he refused to sign a trade agreement with Austria-Hungary that he believed would make Serbia economically dependent on that country.

In 1887 King Milan I (who had assumed the royal title in 1882), alarmed at the threatening attitude of the Radical party, recalled Ristić to power at the head of a coalition cabinet; a new constitution was granted in 1889, and later that year the king abdicated in favor of his son, Prince Alexander. Ristić now became head of a council of regency, entrusted with power during the minority of the young king, and a Radical ministry was formed.

In 1892, however, Ristić transferred the government to the Liberal party, with which he had always been connected. This step and the subsequent conduct of the Liberal politicians caused serious discontent in the country. On 1 (13) April 1893 King Alexander, by a successful stratagem, imprisoned the regents and ministers in the palace, and, declaring himself of age, recalled the Radicals to office.

Ristić now retired into private life. He died in Belgrade on September 4, 1899. Though cautious and deliberate by temperament, he was a man of strong will and firm character.

He was awarded Order of the White Eagle and a number of other decorations.

== Works ==
Undated portrait of Ristić

He was the author of several major historical works:

- The External Relations of Serbia from 1848 to 1867 (Belgrade, 1887);
- Spoljašna odnošaja Srbije novijega vremena: 1868-1872 (U Štampariji KraljevineSrbije, Beograd, 1901);
- Istoriski spisci, Vol. I; Srbija i porta posle bombardovanja Beograda, 1862-1867 (Štampano u drzavnoj štampariji, 1881);
- Poslednja godina spoljavanje politike Mihaila (Štamparija kod Proslave, 1895);
- Jedno nammesnnistvo, 1868-1872 (Štampa Lj J. Bogojevića, 1894);
- Pisma Jovana Ristića Filipu Hristiću od 1870 do 1873 i od 1877 do 1880 (Srpska kraljevska akademija, 1931);
- Diplomatska istorija Srbije: Drugi rat 1875-1878 (Slovo ljabve, 1898)
- A Diplomatic History of Serbia (Belgrade, 1896).
- Die neuere Literatur der Serbien—published by F. Schuster & co. in 1852. Also, another German work,
- Kurze Charakteristik des geistigen u sittlichen Zustands von Serbien (H. Rieger, 1850).

Jovan Ristić was a member of the Serbian Royal Academy of Arts and Sciences and the Serbian Learned Society in Belgrade.

== Legacy ==
The character of Ristich-Kudzhitsky in the novel Anna Karenina by Leo Tolstoy was based on Jovan Ristić.

He is included in The 100 most prominent Serbs.

== See also ==
- List of prime ministers of Serbia

Government offices
Preceded by Milivoje Petrović Blaznavac	Prime Minister of Serbia; 1873	Succeeded by Jovan Marinović
Preceded by Stevča Mihailović	Prime Minister of Serbia; 1878–1880	Succeeded by Milan Piroćanac
Preceded by Milutin Garašanin	Prime Minister of Serbia; 1887–1888	Succeeded by Sava Grujić
Preceded by Petar Velimirović	Prime Minister of Serbia; 1909	Succeeded by Nikola Pašić
Preceded by Ilija Garašanin	Minister of Foreign Affairs; 1867	Succeeded by Milan Petronijević
Preceded by Dimitrije Matić	Minister of Foreign Affairs; 1872–1873	Succeeded by Jovan Marinović
Preceded by Milan Bogićević	Minister of Foreign Affairs; 1875	Succeeded by Đorđe Pavlović
Preceded by Đorđe Pavlović	Minister of Foreign Affairs; 1876–1880	Succeeded by Čedomilj Mijatović
Preceded by Dragutin Franasović	Minister of Foreign Affairs; 1887	Succeeded by Dragutin Franasović
Academic offices
Preceded by Milan Đ. Milićević	President of Serbian Academy of Sciences and Arts; 1899	Succeeded by Sima Lozanić
