= Krsta Cicvarić =

Serbian political activist and journalist (1879–1944)

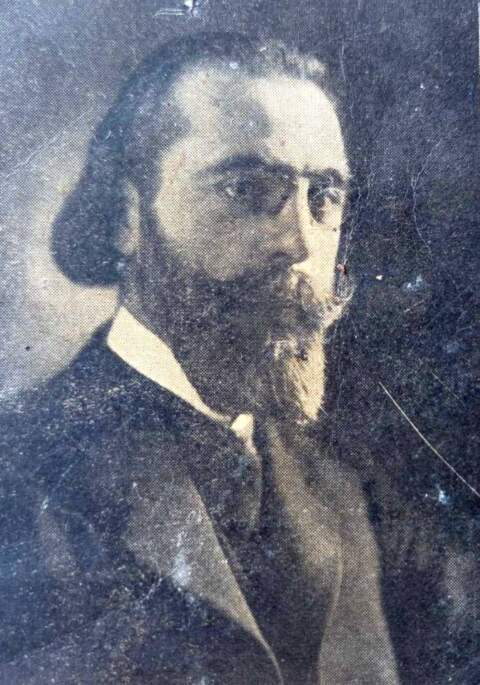
- Born: 14 September 1879; Nikojevići, near Užice, Principality of Serbia
- Died: 31 October 1944 (aged 65); Belgrade, Democratic Federal Yugoslavia
- Cause of death: Execution by firing squad
- Occupation: Journalist

Krsta Cicvarić (Serbian Cyrillic: Крста Цицварић; 14 September 1879 – 31 October 1944) was a Serbian political activist and journalist. During the first decade of the 20th century, he espoused anarcho-syndicalist ideas. However, later in his life, Cicvarić was the editor of several openly antisemitic tabloid journals, and a Nazi collaborator.

He was executed on 31 October 1944 by the Yugoslav Partisans after the Belgrade Offensive.

== Biography ==
=== Early life and education ===
Krsta Cicvarić was born on 14 September 1879 in the village of Nikojevići near Užice, the son of Zaharije and Jovanka. He attended primary school in Mačkat and his earliest known writing includes an article from this period.

He attended the Užice Gymnasium for four years but left in 1896 following a conflict with his physics teacher and prominent Radical, Nastas Petrović. He then moved to Belgrade, where he completed the final two years of gymnasium. Afterward, he enrolled as a part-time student of philosophy, first in Vienna and later at the Velika škola in Belgrade.

In 1898, Cicvarić described himself as a Marxist in several letters to his cousin, Dimitrije Tucović. In these letters, he sided with Georgi Plekhanov in the debate over Eduard Bernstein's revisionism. According to Rafajlo Ješić, Cicvarić likely came into contact with anarchist ideas between 1898 and 1901, and he notes contemporaneous reports of increased anarchist influence among miners in the Podrinje region.

Ješić writes that by 1902 Cicvarić was already a committed anarchist and that he broke with Marxists who had previously been his associates. Tucović claimed that Cicvarić had repeatedly attempted to join the Serbian Social Democratic Party, but that his attempts were rejected because of his anarchist views. Tucović also wrote that Cicvarić was stopped from attending the party's Second Congress and that he was expelled from the party's Fifth Congress in 1907 on the initiative of the party president Dragiša Lapčević, with the approval of the congress.

=== Anarchist political activism ===
Cicvarić was arrested and imprisoned several times for his writings. In 1905 Vasilije Knežević, a member of Cicvarić's group the Equality Workers' Club (Radnički klub Jednakost) founded the anarchist newspaper Bread and Freedom (Hleb i sloboda). Soon after, Knežević started to pay heavy fines for the paper and was imprisoned due to his inability to cover his debts. In this period Cicvarić took over the paper. The paper had only three issues, and Knežević moved to Valjevo after serving his sentence, disillusioned with the anarchists Cicvarić and Petar Munjić. Cicvarić and Munjić later founded the anarchist paper Worker's Struggle (Radnička borba) in 1907. The paper was closed down after the events related to the strike led by sugar workers in Čukarica in February 1907. Cicvarić was imprisoned in Požarevac because of his writing and was later released during the Annexation Crisis in 1908.

In 1911 Cicvarić met Nedeljko Čabrinović who was working on the printing press owned by Živojin Dačić, where Civarić's paper the New Age (Novo vreme) was being printed. Cicvarić gave Čabrinović many books including all of his own works. Čabrinović later smuggled the books to Sarajevo where some were burned by his mother, while some were kept safe and were given to his friends as gifts. From 1911 to 1915, Cicvarić published the daily The Guard (Straža), the "free-minded organ of public thought".

Cicvarić was drafted during the Balkan Wars. He is mentioned by Leon Trotsky in his war correspondence The Balkan Wars: 1912–13 as a "free anarchist" and publisher of The Guard, and as an outspoken critic of the Serbian Social Democratic Party. He writes "Since, in this little country, everyone knows everyone else and does not hesitate to poke his nose into the private lives of his political adversaries, the polemic against the leaders of Social Democracy is carried on in a form that would not bear translation into any European language". He was drafted again in World War I, and surrendered, becoming a prisoner of war of the Austro-Hungarian Empire in Neusiedl am See.

=== Tabloid journalism and Nazi collaboration ===
After World War I, he started writing for Belgrade Daily (Beogradski dnevnik), owned by Dušan Paranos and whose editor-in-chief was Mehmed Žunić. At first, he wrote introductory articles and was the chief polemicist. On 7 August 1922 he was signed as editor and director of the paper. From September 1922 on, the paper bore the title Krsta Cicvarić's Belgrade Daily (Beogradski dnevnik Krste Cicvarića). His main target were the Radicals, as well as Nikola Pašić and Stojan Protić as heads of the party. Pašić was a "thug", "scumbag", "villain" and, ultimately, "the most corrupt person in the entire history of Serbia", and when his son Radomir was beaten, Belgrade Daily wrote that "this act of the youth of the nation in Novi Sad is understandable and must be fully approved". His journalistic writing style in the Kingdom of Yugoslavia was inflammatory, and his scandalous articles were criticized by many, so much that he was even compared with the influential American newspaper publisher William Randolph Hearst.

In 1929 Cicvarić started working in Balkan, owned by Svetolik Savić. Besides journalism, he sold herbs used for treating cancer, tuberculosis, epilepsy, and anthrax. Since Pašić had already died, Cicvarić's main target was president of the Croatian Peasant Party, Vlatko Maček who he calls a "Jewish bastard", and a "long-nose". In his text "To Serbs of the Faith of Moses" from 29 April 1936 Cicvarić writes that "the Jews have ruined our Slavic motherland, Russia, and have spread their evil across the world" and states support for Adolf Hitler.

He spent the final years of his life living in Belgrade, almost completely blind. From May 1940 to March 1941, Savić and Cicvarić published the New Balkan (Novi Balkan), an antisemitic paper sympathetic to Hitler. In 1944 he writes

What does the Jewish spiritual leadership mean in the case of Einstein? He is but a Jew from Hungary ... and besides, Einstein is a juggler mathematician. His famous theory (the so-called Theory of Relativity) is not sufficiently solid and there are strong objections against it. However, the struggle against him was not possible. Holding in their hands a large European press, his compatriots made him into a circus advertisement: they portrayed him as the greatest scientific genius ever born ... So the Jew from Pest became world famous and such an authority that his scientific congresses could not be objected to in his presence. In the scientific world in Europe at the time, there existed a state that can be called the Einstein Obsession. Hitler's revolution marked an end to that obsession in Germany and all across Europe.

— Krsta Cicvarić, The Serbian People, (6 May 1944)

=== Apprehension and death ===
Cicvarić was accused of collaborationism and shot without trial during the night between 30 and 31 October 1944. His burial site remains unknown.

== Works ==
Cicvarić wrote only a couple of books in philosophy, and most of his works were political. He was a columnist in a lot of newspapers and was a fierce critic of the Serbian philosopher and scientist Branislav Petronijević. His early political life was devoted to writing books on anarchism and critique of the Western civilization. He was a fierce opponent of monarchism, communism, social democracy and imperialism.

- Iz аnarhističkog progrаmа, Novа štаmpаrijа S. Rаdenkovićа i Brаtа, Belgrade, 1909.
- Plаvа knjigа o srpskom pitаnju, Gecа Kon i Komp., Cetinje, 1909.
- Socijаlisti na vlаdi. Sv. 1, Štаmpаrijа D. Dimitrijevićа, Belgrade, 1909.
- Ideаlizаm ili mаterijаlizаm, s naročitim pogledom na filosofiju Brаnislаvа Petronijevićа, Štаmpаrijа Srbija, Belgrade, 1909.
- Kаko ćemo pobediti Austriju, Nаumović i Stefаnović, Belgrade, 1909.
- Anarhizаm i аnarhisti, Nаumović i Stefаnović, Belgrade, 1909.
- Dаrvin ili Lаmаrk, pаd dаrvinističke doktrine, Štаmpаrijа Srbija, Belgrade, 1910.
- Svetozаr Mаrković i birokrаtski sistem pred sudom Slobodаna Jovаnovićа, B. Dimitrijević, Belgrade, 1910.
- Socijаlizаm i bаlkаnskа konfederаcijа ili Jedаn krupаn uspeh srpske socijаlne demokrаtije, Štаmpаrijа Srbija, Belgrade, 1910.
- Srpskа socijаlna demokrаtijа na prekretu, Štаmpаrijа Petrа Munjićа i Komp., Belgrade, 1910.
- O Sаnjinu, odbrаna i kritikа, Štаmpаrijа Srbija, Belgrade, 1910.
- Demokrаtijа i socijаlizаm, kritički pogled na njihovu prаksu i njihovu teoriju, Izdаnje piščevo, Belgrade, 1910.
- Štа je metаfizikа, Štаmpаrijа Srbija, Belgrade, 1910.
- Stojаn Protić i naš novi ustаv, Beogrаdski dnevnik, Belgrade, 1919.
