= Dušan A. Popović =

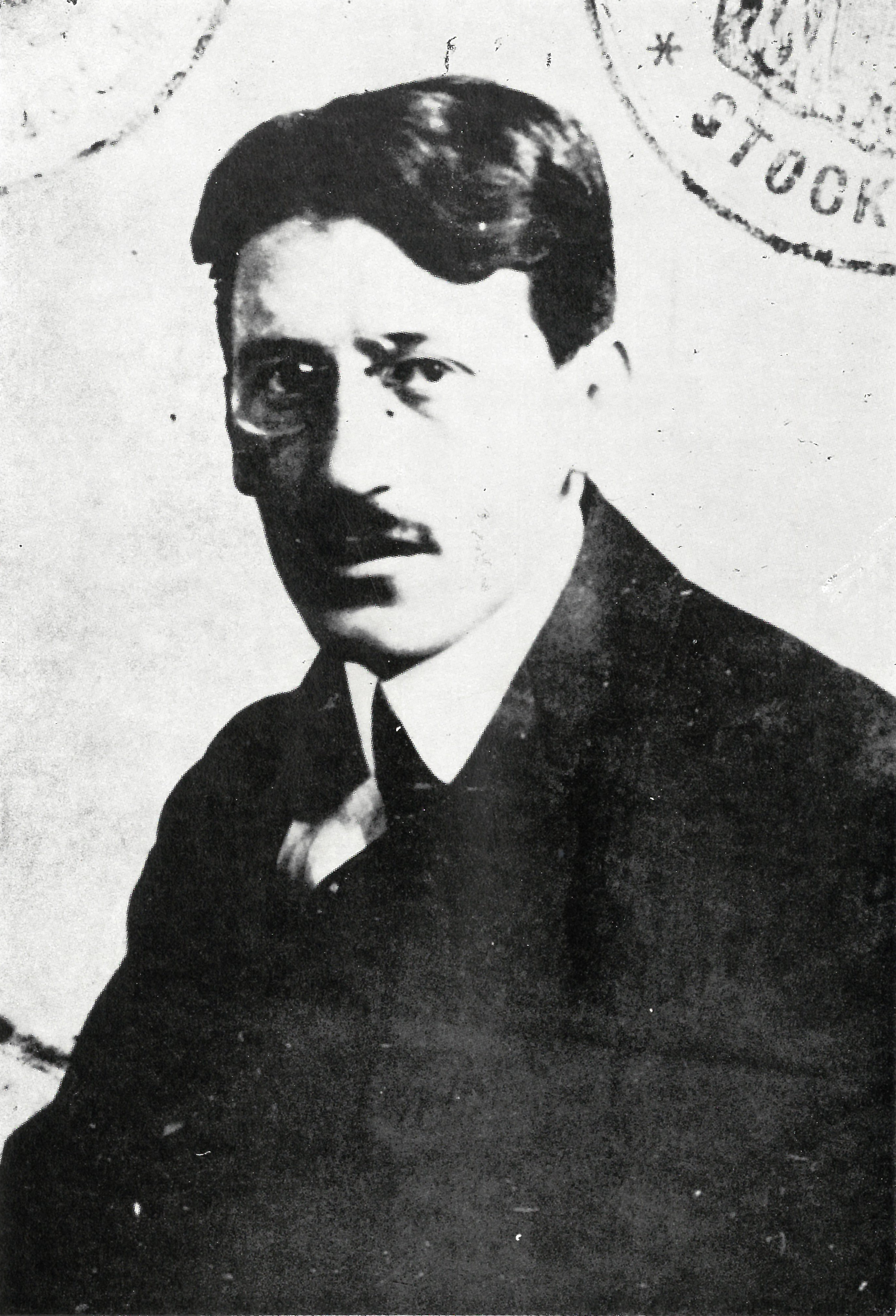
- Popović's passport photograph, 1917
- Born: 6 January 1885; Jagodina, Kingdom of Serbia
- Died: 8 November 1918 (aged 33); London, United Kingdom
- Occupations: Journalist, publicist and politician

Dušan Popović (Serbian Cyrillic: Душан Поповић; 6 January 1885 – 8 November 1918) was a Serbian journalist, publicist and politician. He was secretary of the Serbian Social Democratic Party (SSDP).

In England, he was often styled Doushan Popovitch.

== Early life ==
Dušan A. Popović was born on 6 January 1885 [O.S. 25 December 1884] in the village of Volujak (now part of Dragovo) in the Levač region. His father Aleksa Popović, originally from Vojvodina, was orphaned during the Hungarian Revolution and was adopted as a three-year-old by the Avakumović family in Belgrade in 1848. He went on to become a teacher, and taught in several places, stationed in Volujak at the time of Dušan's birth. Dušan was the seventh child of Aleksa and Jevica (Mileva) Popović.

Dušan spent his childhood in Volujak, where he attended elementary school from 1891 to 1895. Popović attended the first two grades of lower gymnasium in Kragujevac, and the third and fourth in a private school in Jagodina. He passed his finals in Kragujevac. When his older brother Mirko became a substitute teacher at the Užice Gymnasium, Dušan moved in with him and there he attended fifth, sixth and eighth grade. The entire family moved to Užice soon after, and Dušan often returned to his family home in the town later during his life. He attended seventh grade and passed his finals in Belgrade.

== Early activism ==
During his fifth or sixth grade at the Užice Gymnasium, Popović joined the Student group "Progress" (Serbian: Đačka družina "Napredak") in 1901. The group was started several years earlier, but came to be known as Radovan's Socialist School, notably led by Radovan Dragović. There, he first met his future companion Dimitrije Tucović.

After graduating from gymnasium in the fall of 1903, Dušan enrolled at the Faculty of Law. During his second year, he started writing in the Worker's Journal (Serbian: Radničke novine), the official newspaper of the Serbian Social Democratic Party (SSDP). He was active in the Socialist Students' Club of the Belgrade Velika škola, and joined the SSDP soon after, in 1905.

== Activities in the SSDP ==
From 1908 to 1912, Popović was a lecturer at a party school in Belgrade. Alongside Dimitrije Tucović, he launched the Borba newspaper, which was a fortnightly journal of the SSDP, which was published between 1910 and 1914.

Popović emigrated from occupied Serbia in the summer of 1917. He disagreed with the committee of the SSDP in Paris, who supported the Entente in World War I. He wrote to the committee in August 1918, claiming the war was fought with imperialist goals on both sides. Popović supported the ongoing Russian Revolution, as "the best guarantee for world peace" and the "embryo of a new International".

== Death ==
After many years active in the international socialist movement, Popović died on 8 November 1918. He was buried at Highgate Cemetery next to the grave of Karl Marx but in December 1959, his remains were moved to Belgrade and re-interred in the Alley of Greats at the Belgrade New Cemetery.

== Publications ==
Popović D. A. & Katslerovic T. (1918) Memorandum by the Serbian Socialist Party upon the conditions in occupied Serbia Washington, D.C.: Serbian Press Bureau
