= Nastas Petrović =

Serbian and Yugoslav politician

- Настас Петровић
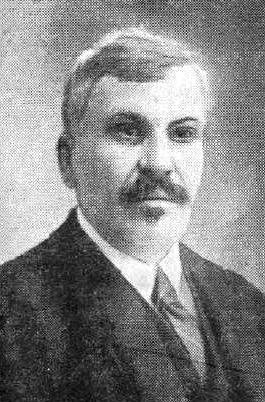
- Image of Petrović taken from the Digital Library of Slovenia

Minister of the Interior of Yugoslavia
- In office 28 July 1924 – 6 November 1924
- Prime Minister: Ljubomir Davidović
- Preceded by: Milan Srškić
- Succeeded by: Božidar Maksimović

Minister of Internal Affairs of Serbia
- In office 12 June 1907 – 12 April 1908
- Prime Minister: Nikola Pašić
- Preceded by: Stojan Protić
- Succeeded by: Marko Trifković

Personal details
- Born: 5 November 1867 Čačak, Principality of Serbia
- Died: 22 February 1933 (aged 65) Belgrade, Kingdom of Yugoslavia
- Party: People's Radical Party
- Education: University of Belgrade
- Occupation: Politician

Nastas Petrović (Serbian Cyrillic: Настас Петровић; 5 November 1867 – 22 February 1933) was a Serbian politician who served as interior minister of Serbia and Yugoslavia.

== Biography ==
Petrović was born in 1867 in the city of Čačak, where he completed his early studies, and later moved to study at the Faculty of Philosophy, University of Belgrade. After graduating in 1892, he began working as a teacher at the Užice Gymnasium, but was dismissed due to his political support for radicalism, for which he was also placed under custody. In 1900 he was reinstated in the workforce, being hired as a teacher at the Jagodina Men's Teachers' College. As a young man he was a follower of the ideas of the late Svetozar Marković; while still a student he became the chairman of the "Nada" association and a teacher of the "Pobratimstvo" association, both of which had radical ideologies. In 1902 he joined the People's Radical Party (NRS) and began to collaborate with radical newspapers such as "Narodni pokret"; by 1907 he was already the chairman of the Serbian Association of Journalists, holding this post for a long time, simultaneously with that of the chairman of the Association of Municipal Education Directors.

Petrović was one of the most famous radical speakers: He was singled out by the media for the strength of his oratory and his temperament. He was first elected to political office in 1901, taking a seat in the National Assembly, and, while not re-elected in 1903, he returned to the Assembly in 1905, retaining the seat in the Serbian elections of 1906, 1908, and 1912 and in the Yugoslav elections of 1920, 1923, and 1925. In 1903 he became the first secretary of the Board of Directors of the People's Radical Party, holding the position until July 1924. He was a deputy to the Corfu National Assembly of 1916 and in late 1915, in the midst of World War I, he created a group of independent radicals who broke away from the party and opposed the leadership of Nikola Pašić. After the end of the war he rejoined the party with his followers, but continued to oppose Pašić, especially on issues concerning Croatia: Petrović tried to cooperate closely with Stjepan Radić, while Pašić distrusted him and the Croatian Peasant Party.

He served twice as interior minister: First in the Kingdom of Serbia during the government of Pašić, between 12 June 1907 and 12 April 1908; his tenure in the ministry was turbulent, as he was charged with murder after the assassinations of Milan Novaković and Maksim Novaković, supporters of the deposed House of Obrenović and opponents of the Black Hand. The debate was brought before the National Assembly three times and was dismissed by the prosecution in 1911.

In 1924, after the death of the party leader, Stojan Protić, he became chairman of the "Independent Radicals", a small parliamentary group advocating a coalition with the Croats. That same year, and being very close to King Alexander I, he was elected as Minister of the Interior for the second time, this time in the Kingdom of Yugoslavia during the government of Ljubomir Davidović; this government, called the "People's Accord Bloc", was an attempt to create a broad coalition of parties, and consisted of Davidović's Democratic Party, Anton Korošec's Slovenian People's Party and Mehmed Spaho's Yugoslav Muslim Organization, with support from Radić's Croatian Peasant Party. However, this coalition government only lasted a few months. After being re-elected to the National Assembly for the last time in 1925, he lost his political influence and did not return to the People's Radical Party. He died in Belgrade in February 1933.

== Bibliography ==
- Fogelquist, Alan (2011). Politics and Economic Policy in Yugoslavia, 1918–1929. Los Angeles. ISBN 978-1-257-94299-2.
- Prodanović, Ј. (1928). Petrović, Nastas (in Serbian). Vol. 3 (Narodna enciklopedija Srba, Hrvata i Slovenaca ed.). Zagreb: Bibliografski zavod. p. 347.
- Jov, В. (2008). Petrović, Nastas (in Serbian) (Enciklopedija srpskog naroda ed.). Beograd. pp. 381–382.
- Taletov, Petar (1928). Savremeni političari: prva serija [Stjepan Radić, Ljuba Davidović, Nastas Petrović] (in Serbian). Vol. 1. Beograd: Francusko-srpska knjižara. pp. 125–152.
- Vlade Srbije (1805–2005) (in Serbian). Beograd. 2005.
- Roter-Crkvenjakov, Dragana, ed. (1992). Sve srpske vlade (in Serbian). Beograd: Republika Srbija, Ministarstvo informisanja. p. 74.
- Popović Obradović, Olga (1998). Parlamentarizam u Srbiji od 1903. do 1914 (in Serbo-Croatian). Beograd. pp. 325–329, 385–389.
- Perišić, M. (2012). Ministarstvo i ministri policije u Srbiji 1811–2011 (in Serbian). Beograd. p. 287.

Political offices
Preceded by Stojan Protić	Minister of Internal Affairs of Serbia; 1907–1908	Succeeded by Marko Trifković
Preceded by Milan Srškić	Minister of the Interior of Yugoslavia; 1924	Succeeded by Božidar Maksimović
