= Vladimir Tucović =

Serbian soldier

- Владимир Туцовић
- Born: 1874; Gostilje, Principality of Serbia
- Died: 26 November 1947 (aged 72/73); Belgrade, FPR Yugoslavia
- Relatives: Dimitrije Tucović (brother)
- Military career
- Allegiance: Serbia (–1918)
- Branch: Royal Serbian Army
- Service years: –1918
- Rank: Lieutenant colonel
- Conflicts: Balkan Wars; World War I

Vladimir Tucović (Serbian Cyrillic: Владимир Туцовић; 1874 – 26 November 1947) was a Serbian lieutenant colonel, participant in the Balkan Wars and World War I, and member of the Black Hand. He was a brother of a socialist politician and writer Dimitrije Tucović.

== Biography ==
Tucović was born in 1874 in the village of Gostilje in the Zlatibor area in the Principality of Serbia. He was the son of the Orthodox priest Jevrem Tucović and the eldest of the three Tucović brothers. His younger brothers were Dimitrije Tucović, one of the first Serbian socialists and Stevan Tucović, an officer.

He was a corpse officer of the Royal Serbian Army, who acquired ranks on the battlefield. He was one of the officers of the conspirators who took part in the May Coup. As a very brave and capable officer, he caught the eye of General Staff officer Dragutin Dimitrijević "Apis", who offered him to join the secret organization "Unification or Death", derogatory called "Black Hand", which was founded in 1911. According to the statute of this organization, he had to introduce five more new members that would make up his group. He then offered membership to Majors Josif Kostić and Petar Živković, but after the discovery of Crown Prince Alexander about their connection with this secret organization, all three were transferred. Tucović was then transferred to the battalion commander in Čačak. Josif Kostić and Petar Živković will become the leaders of the opposing organization "White Hand", which will organize and implement the Thessaloniki process.

During 1912 and 1913, Vladimir Tucović took part in the Balkan Wars for the liberation of the Old Serbia. During these liberation wars, Tucović opposed the massive looting carried out by new officials. Because of these robberies, there was a conflict between the police and the army because the officers tried to resist the robbery. The then Minister of the Interior, Stojan Protić, passed a Decree placing the civil government above the war, which further inflamed this conflict, which was later fatal for the "blacks".

When World War I broke out in 1914, Tucović stood out especially in the Battle of Cer and the Battle of Kolubara. After the Great Retreat, in 1916, new political games began in which the "blacks", and above all Apis, were blamed for all the misfortune. The reason for the confrontation with the members of the "Black Hand" was the failed assassination of Regent Alexander on 11 September 1916 when someone shot at his car near Thessaloniki. Immediately afterwards, Dragutin Dimitrijević Apis and other members of the "Unification or Death" organization were arrested, including cavalry lieutenant colonel Vladimir Tucović.

The trial against Apis and his associates was held in June 1917 in Thessaloniki and is known as the Thessaloniki trial. The biggest uproar in the trial was raised by Tucović. He reacted to the insults from the audience and cursed the lower officers who demanded their death. He got up from the protest, although it was strictly forbidden. In the first verdict, he received, along with Apis, the death penalty, but it was later commuted to twenty years in prison. After the end of the First World War and the return to the newly created state of Yugoslavia, the surviving "blacks", including Tucović were partially pardoned.

After being pardoned, Vladimir Tucović decided to leave the military service. He started trading in wood and soon became one of the largest exporters in the Kingdom of Serbs, Croats and Slovenes. The center of his company was in Travnik, and he exported wood to the whole of Europe. However, he got rich, he did not forget his old friends and he supported the surviving "black hands". He opened a tavern for Muhamed Mehmedbašić in Stolac, where he was expelled from Ilidža, due to the arrival of King Alexander I. He also provided material assistance to Mustafa Golubić, who was in exile in Vienna.

During the German occupation in World War II he lived peacefully in the occupied Belgrade. After the liberation of Yugoslavia, in August 1945 he was elected a councilor of the Anti-Fascist Council of the People's Liberation of Yugoslavia (AVNOJ) and participated in its Third Session.

He died in Belgrade on 26 November 1947.

For his war merits, he was awarded two Orders of Karađorđe's Star.
