= Komarane =

Village in Serbia

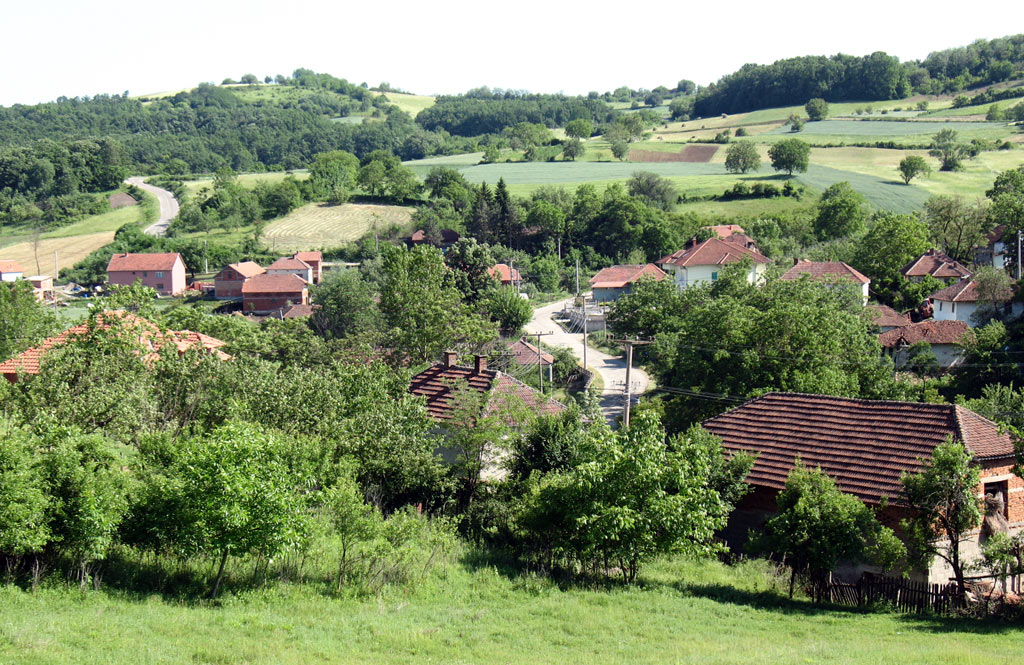
Komarane (2009)

Komarane (Serbian Cyrillic: Комаране) is a village in Central Serbia (Šumadija), in the municipality of Rekovac (Region of Levač), lying at 43°49′55″N 21°04′40″E, at the elevation of 280 m. According to the 2002 census, the village had 254 citizens.
