= Tečić =

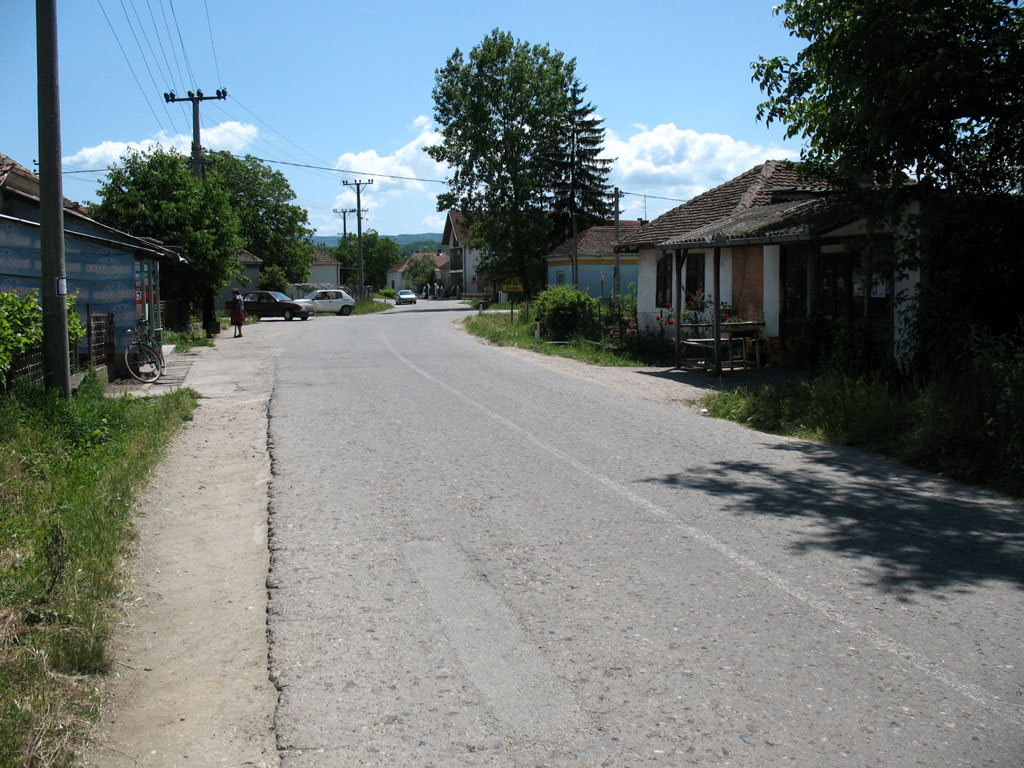

Tečić (Serbian Cyrillic: Течић) is a village in Central Serbia (Šumadija), in the municipality of Rekovac (Region of Levač), lying at 43°50′07″N 21°07′29″E, at the elevation of 210 m. According to the 2002 census, the village had 660 citizens.
