= Nadrlje =

- Village
- Location within Serbia
- Coordinates: 43°48′27″N 20°57′12″E
- Country: Serbia
- Time zone: UTC+1 (CET)
  - Summer (DST): UTC+2 (CEST)

Nadrlje (Serbian Cyrillic: Надрље) is a village in Central Serbia (Šumadija), in the municipality of Rekovac (Region of Levač), lying at 43°48′27″N 20°57′12″E, at the elevation of 520 m. According to the 2002 census, the village had 229 citizens.
