= Bogalinac =

- Village
- Location within Serbia
- Coordinates: 43°49′19″N 21°01′53″E
- Country: Serbia
- Time zone: UTC+1 (CET)
  - Summer (DST): UTC+2 (CEST)

Bogalinac (Serbian Cyrillic: Богалинац) is a village in Central Serbia (Šumadija), in the municipality of Rekovac (Region of Levač), lying at 43°49′19″N 21°01′53″E, at the elevation of 375 m. According to the 2002 census, the village had an estimated 163 residents.
