= Lomnica (Rekovac) =

Lomnica Ломница
- Village
- Location within Serbia
- Coordinates: 43°52′25″N 21°05′56″E
- Country: Serbia
- Time zone: UTC+1 (CET)
  - Summer (DST): UTC+2 (CEST)

Lomnica (Serbian Cyrillic: Ломница) is a village in Central Serbia (Šumadija), in the municipality of Rekovac (Region of Levač), lying at 43°52′25″N 21°05′56″E, at the elevation of 250 m. According to the 2002 census, the village had 169 citizens.
