= Lepojević =

- Village
- Location within Serbia
- Coordinates: 43°44′52″N 21°04′13″E
- Country: Serbia
- Elevation: 1,066 ft (325 m)

Population (2011)
  - Total: 302
- Time zone: UTC+1 (CET)
  - Summer (DST): UTC+2 (CEST)

Lepojević (Serbian Cyrillic: Лепојевић) is a village in Šumadija and Western Serbia (Šumadija), in the municipality of Rekovac (Region of Levač), lying at 43°44′52″N 21°04′13″E, at the elevation of 340 m. According to the 2002 census, the village had 362 citizens.
