= Županjevac =

Village in Serbia

Županjevac (Serbian Cyrillic: Жупанјевац) is a village in Šumadija and Western Serbia (Šumadija), in the municipality of Rekovac (Region of Levač), lying at 43°48′37″N 21°01′34″E, at the elevation of 365 m. According to the 2002 census, the village had 464 citizens.
