= Šljivica =

Village in Šumadija, Serbia

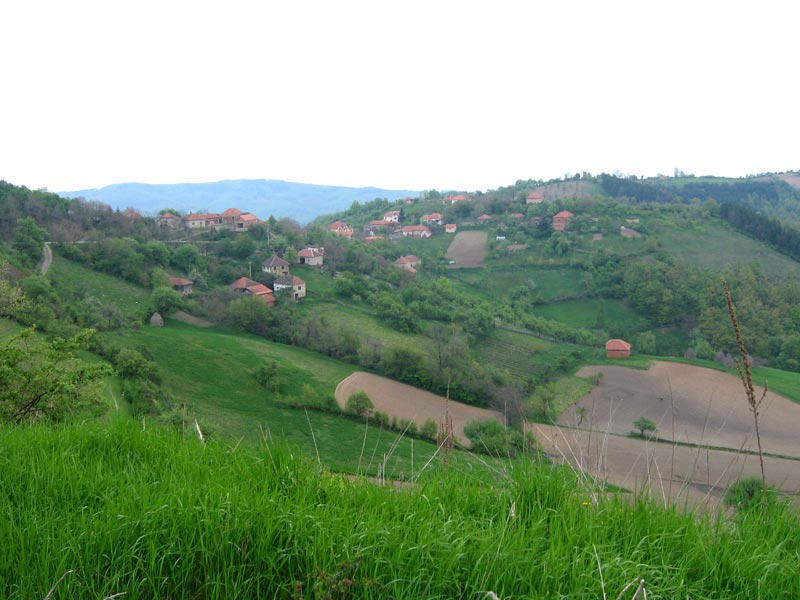

Šljivica (Serbian Cyrillic: Шљивица) is a small village in Šumadija and Western Serbia (Šumadija), in the municipality of Rekovac (Region of Levač). The village has around 157 residents. It lies at 43°45′26″N 20°59′55″E, at the altitude of 680 m.
