= Motrić =

Village in Central Serbia

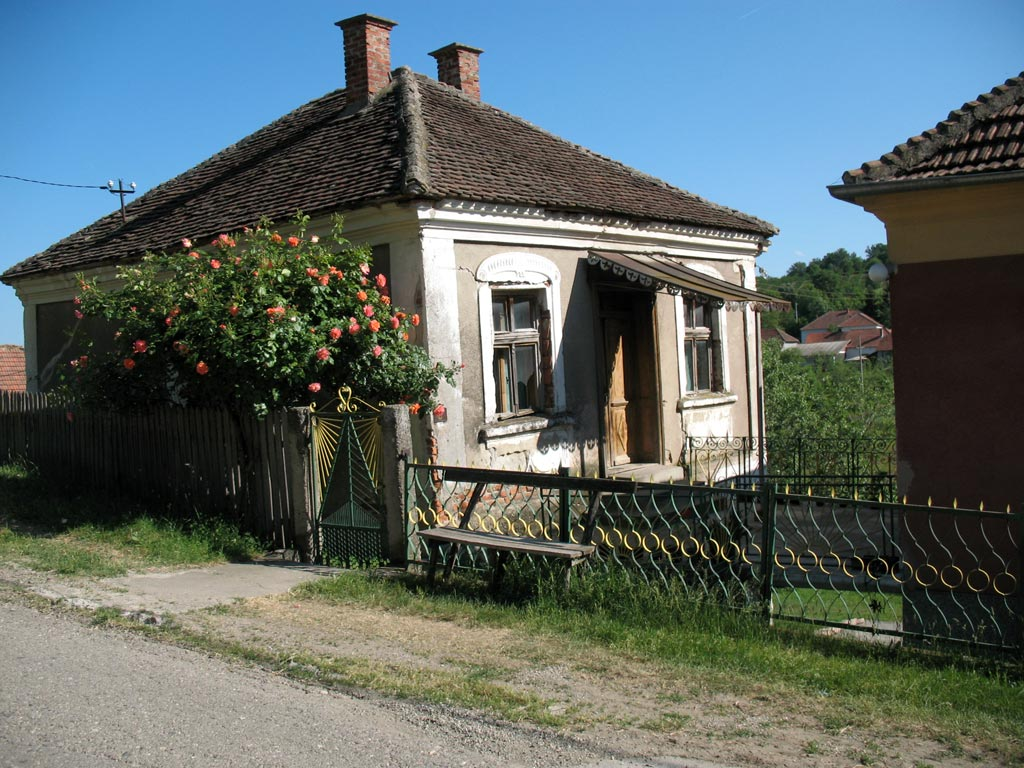

Motrić (Serbian Cyrillic: Мотрић) is a village in Central Serbia (Šumadija), in the municipality of Rekovac (Region of Levač), lying at 43°49′04″N 21°04′28″E, at the elevation of 350 m. According to the 2002 census, the village had 175 citizens.
