= Sekurič =

Village

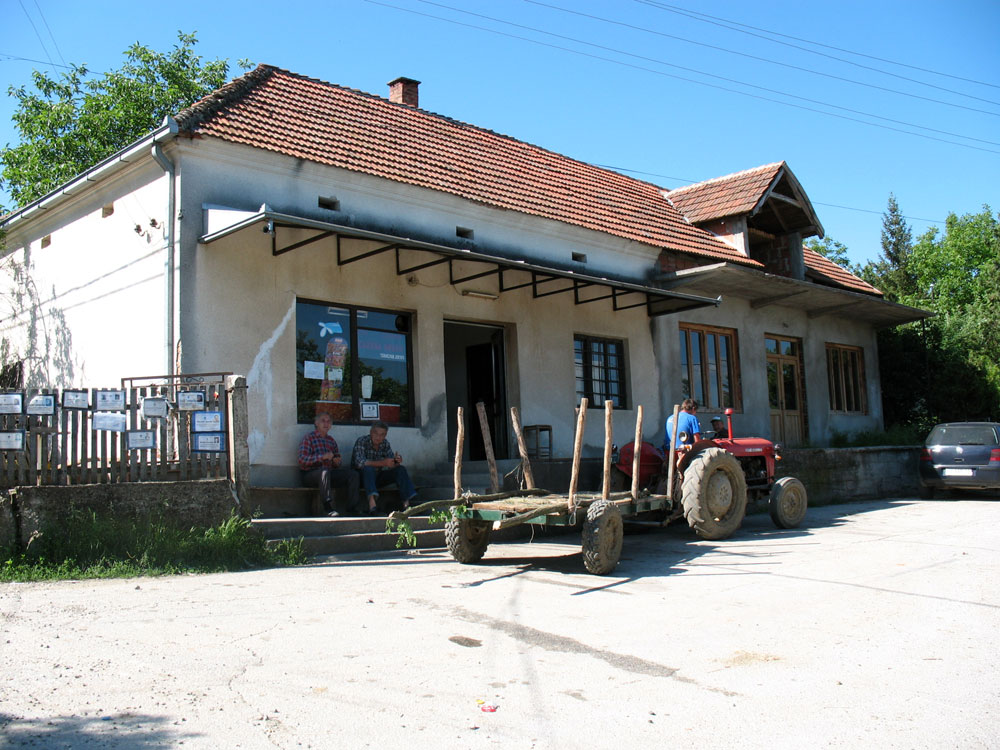

Sekurič (Serbian Cyrillic: Секурич) is a village in Central Serbia (Šumadija), in the municipality of Rekovac (Region of Levač), lying at 43°47′52″N 21°11′03″E, at the elevation of 315 m. According to the 2011 census, the village had 660 citizens.

Since 2013. local tourist organisation is organising beans festival every year - "Pasuljijada".
