= Beočić =

- Village
- Location within Serbia
- Coordinates: 43°50′36″N 21°11′46″E
- Country: Serbia
- Time zone: UTC+1 (CET)
  - Summer (DST): UTC+2 (CEST)

Beočić (Serbian Cyrillic: Беочић) is a village in Šumadija and Western Serbia (Šumadija), in the municipality of Rekovac (Region of Levač), lying at 43°50′36″N 21°11′46″E, at the elevation of 220 m. According to the 2002 census, the village had 572 citizens.
