= Rabenovac =

- Village
- Location within Serbia
- Coordinates: 43°49′45″N 21°08′18″E
- Country: Serbia
- District: Pomoravlje District
- Municipality: Rekovac

Population (2002)
  - Total: 128
- Time zone: UTC+1 (CET)
  - Summer (DST): UTC+2 (CEST)

Rabenovac is a village in the municipality of Rekovac, Serbia. According to the 2002 census, the village has a population of 128 people.
