= Serbian Social Democratic Party =

Serbian Social Democratic Party may refer to:

- Serbian Social Democratic Party (Kosovo)
- Serbian Social Democratic Party (Kingdom of Serbia) (1903-1918)

== See also ==
- Social Democratic Party of Serbia
- Social Democratic Party (Serbia)
- Social Democratic Party (Serbia, 2002)
