= Kaludra (Rekovac) =

- Village
- Location within Serbia
- Coordinates: 43°46′N 21°04′E
- Country: Serbia
- District: Pomoravlje District
- Municipality: Rekovac

Population (2002)
  - Total: 327
- Time zone: UTC+1 (CET)
  - Summer (DST): UTC+2 (CEST)

Kaludra is a village in the municipality of Rekovac, Serbia. According to the 2002 census, the village has a population of 327 people.
