= Brajinovac =

- Village
- Location within Serbia
- Coordinates: 43°46′40″N 21°07′50″E
- Country: Serbia
- District: Pomoravlje District
- Municipality: Rekovac

Population (2002)
  - Total: 221
- Time zone: UTC+1 (CET)
  - Summer (DST): UTC+2 (CEST)

Brajinovac is a village in the municipality of Rekovac, Serbia. According to the 2002 census, the village has a population of 221 people.
