= 1908 Serbian parliamentary election =

- 31 May 1908
- All 160 seats in the National Assembly; 81 seats needed for a majority
- Turnout: 70.0%
Party	Leader	Vote %	Seats	+/–
NRS	Nikola Pašić	43.62	84	−7
SRS	Ljubomir Stojanović	31.07	48	+1
NS–SNS	–	16.29	17	+16
National	Stojan Ribarac	4.08	7	−8
Progressive	Stojan Novaković	2.94	3	−2
SSDP	Dragiša Lapčević	0.76	1	0
This lists parties that won seats. See the complete results below.
Prime Minister before	Prime Minister after
Nikola Pašić; NRS	Petar Velimirović; NRS

Parliamentary elections were held in Serbia on 31 May 1908. The result was a victory for the ruling People's Radical Party, which won 84 of the 160 seats in the National Assembly.

== Results ==
Party	Votes	%	Seats	+/–
People's Radical Party	175,667	43.62	84	–7
Independent Radical Party	125,131	31.07	48	+1
National Party–Progressive coalition	65,608	16.29	17	+16
National Party	16,449	4.08	7	–8
Serbian Progressive Party	11,855	2.94	3	–2
Serbian National Peasant Accord	2,585	0.64	0	0
Social Democratic Party	3,043	0.76	1	0
People's Radical dissidents	1,870	0.46	0	0
Independent Radical dissidents	370	0.09	0	0
Independent lists	106	0.03	0	0
Total	402,684	100.00	160	0
Registered voters/turnout	574,851	–		
Source: Slobodan Antonic
