= Dragovo (Serbia) =

Dragovo (Rekovac)
- Village
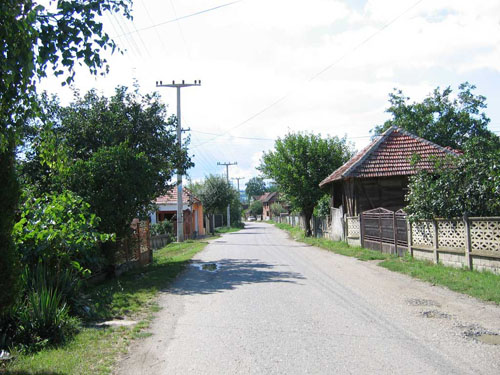
- Dragovo in 2005

- Location within Serbia
- Coordinates: 43°47′27″N 21°05′23″E
- Country: Serbia
- District: Pomoravlje District
- Municipality: Rekovac

Area
  - Land: 7.73 sq mi (20.02 km^{2})
- Elevation: 980 ft (300 m)

Population (2011)
  - Total: 904
- Time zone: UTC+1 (CET)
  - Summer (DST): UTC+2 (CEST)

Dragovo (Serbian Cyrillic: Драгово) is a village in the municipality of Rekovac, in the historical region of Levač, a part of Šumadija.

== History ==
Despite traces of earlier settlements, the first large-scale settlements appeared in Dragovo during the 18th century.

Originally, present Dragovo consisted of three villages - Puljci, Volujak and Dubnica. On 29 August 1900 the three villages were united as Dragovo. The godfathers of Dragovo were King Alexander I of Serbia and Queen Draga Mašin. However, their planned visit to this village was never carried out.

The school in Dragovo was established in 1843, and the church was built in 1894. Dragovo is culturally a part of Šumadija.

== Population ==
In 1864, there were 156 homes and 980 residents totally in Puljci and Volujak. In 1900, Dragovo had 1884 residents and 270 homes. During 20th century, the population of Dragovo increased significantly – 1931. 400 homes and 2190 residents and 1948. maximum of 2987 people in 470 homes. In 2000, Dragovo housed 1621 residents in 381 homes and 924 of them in its biggest part, Puljci.

From the mid-19th century and until recent times, Dragovo was the most populated village in the Levač region, larger than the municipality center of Rekovac.

== Trivia ==
Puljci, a part of Dragovo is birthplace of Milosav Mitrović Losa, whose image is the basis for the traditional logo of nearby Jagodina brewery. After him, "Jagodina Beer" is commonly nicknamed "Čiča" (Serbian: Old man). Mitrović spent his entire life in this village.
