= Vukmanovac =

- Village
- Location within Serbia
- Coordinates: 43°50′07″N 21°09′39″E
- Country: Serbia
- District: Pomoravlje District
- Municipality: Rekovac

Population (2002)
  - Total: 477
- Time zone: UTC+1 (CET)
  - Summer (DST): UTC+2 (CEST)

Vukmanovac is a village in the municipality of Rekovac, Serbia. According to the 2002 census, the village has a population of 477 people.

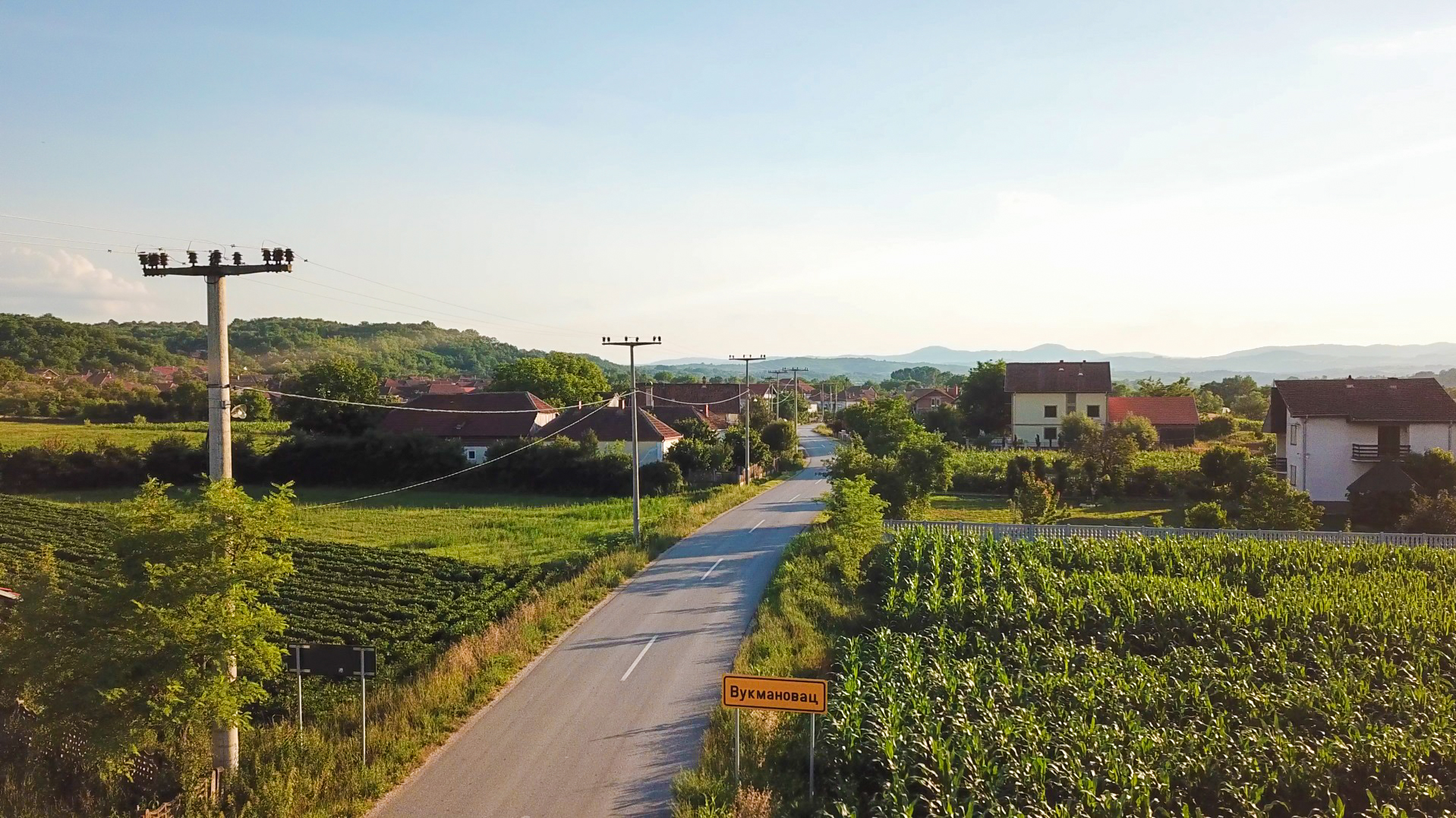
Vukmanovac 2022 summer

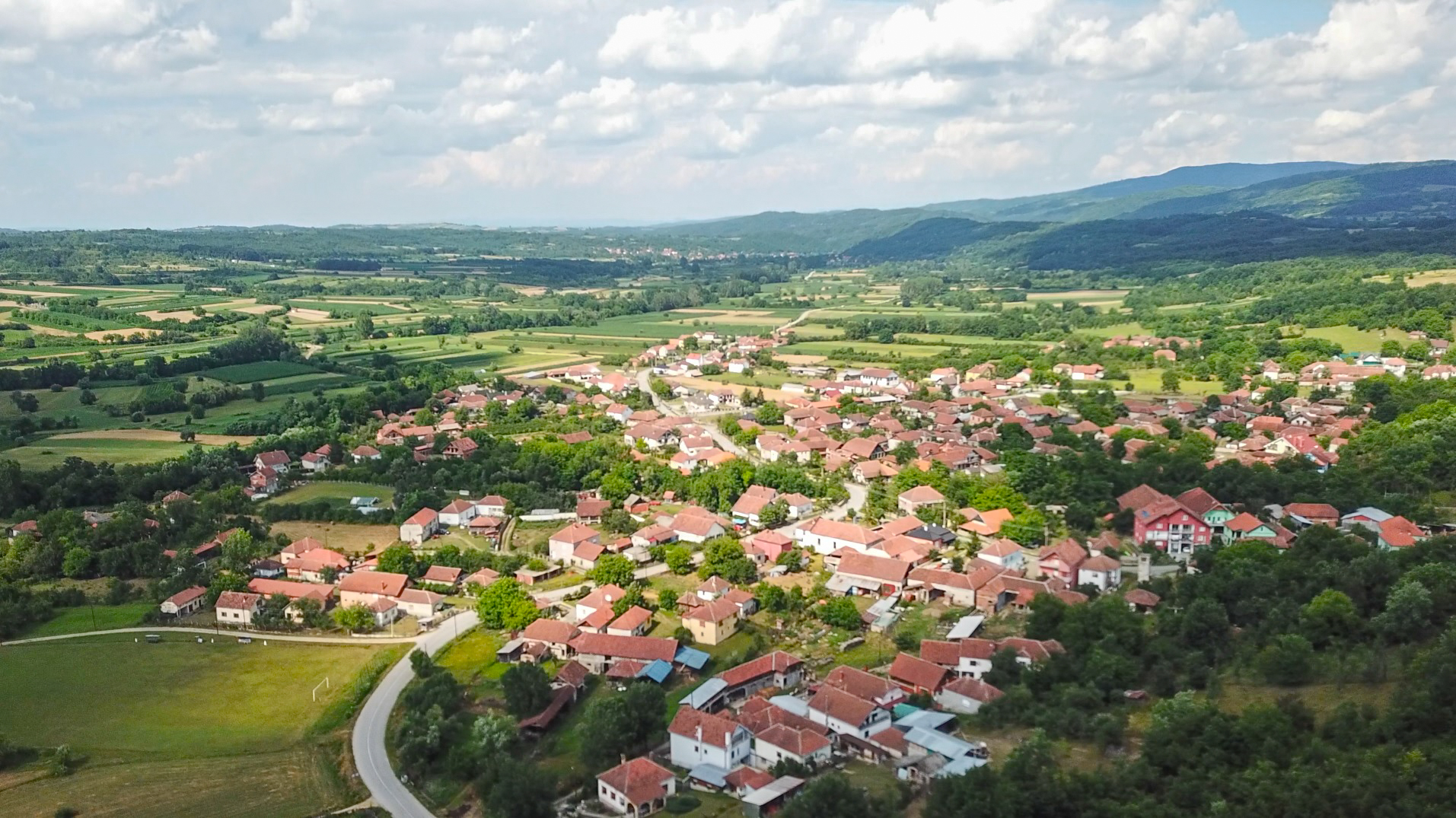
Vukmanovac village, central Serbia, Levach

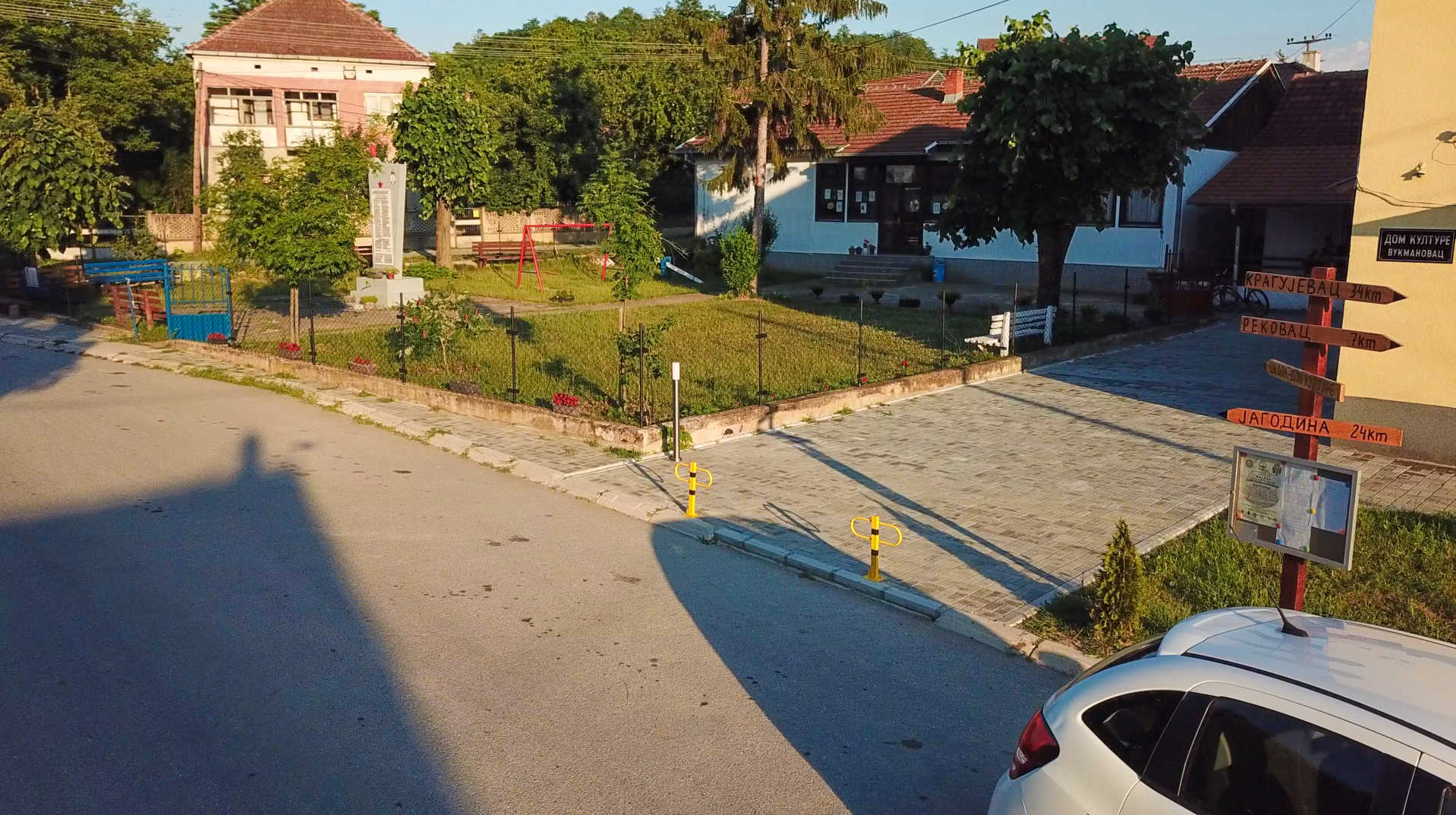
Dom kulture Vukmanovac
