= Nedeljko Čabrinović =

Bosnian Serb conspirator in the assassination of Archduke Franz Ferdinand (1895–1916)

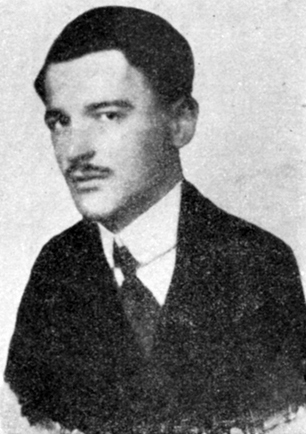
- Nedeljko Čabrinović in custody, 1914
- Born: Nedeljko Čabrinović; 1 February 1895; Sarajevo, Bosnia and Herzegovina, Austria-Hungary
- Died: 23 January 1916 (aged 20); Theresienstadt Fortress, Kingdom of Bohemia, Austria-Hungary
- Occupations: Typesetter, Political Activist
- Organization: Young Bosnia
- Known for: Role in the assassination of Archduke Franz Ferdinand
- Motive: Yugoslav nationalism
- Conviction: High treason
- Penalty: 20 years of hard labour

Nedeljko Čabrinović (Serbian Cyrillic: Недељко Чабриновић; 1 February 1895 – 23 January 1916) was a Bosnian Serb typesetter and political activist, known for his role in the assassination of Archduke Franz Ferdinand in Sarajevo on 28 June 1914. A member of Young Bosnia, a nationalist revolutionary group advocating for the unification of South Slavs, he was one of six conspirators involved in the assassination attempt.

During the attack, Čabrinović threw a hand grenade at the Archduke's motorcade, but the explosive missed its target and detonated beneath the following vehicle. He was apprehended shortly after and later convicted of high treason. Since he was under 21, he was ineligible for the death penalty and received a twenty-year sentence of hard labour at the Theresienstadt fortress in Bohemia. While in prison, he endured harsh conditions and contracted tuberculosis, leading to his death on 23 January 1916. Following World War I, his remains were reinterred in Sarajevo alongside other conspirators in the Vidovdan Heroes Chapel.

== Early life ==
Nedeljko Čabrinović was born on 1 February [O.S. 20 January] 1895 in Sarajevo, Bosnia and Herzegovina, which was under Austro-Hungarian administration at the time. He was one of nine children, and his father, Vaso Čabrinović, operated a café in Sarajevo. Vaso was also known to be an informant for the Austro-Hungarian police, a role that caused frequent friction between them. Čabrinović initially attended the Merchants School in Trebinje, Herzegovina, near his father's birthplace.

In 1908, he moved to Sarajevo to continue his education at the Sarajevo Merchants School, but he failed the final examination. He subsequently pursued various apprenticeships before securing a position at a Serbian printing plant in Sarajevo, where he spent two years training as a typesetter. During this period, Čabrinović became involved in labour organisation. At the age of fourteen, he was elected as the first president of the Printers' Apprentice Guild, seeking to organise apprentices within the printing industry. His employment ended following a physical altercation with a colleague, after which his father expelled him from their home.

== Radicalisation ==
=== Political involvement and radicalisation ===
Čabrinović lived and worked in several cities, including Novi Sad, Karlovci, and Šid, where he was employed at the Socialist Printing House. He later moved to Belgrade, in the Kingdom of Serbia, where he secured a position at Dačić's Printing House, a press known for publishing anarchist literature. During his time in Belgrade, Čabrinović was influenced by fellow workers, particularly Krsta Cicvarić, the editor of Novo Vreme, an anarchist periodical. He attended evening lectures on anarchist thought and began identifying as an anarchist, or, as he later described himself, an "anarchical socialist".

In 1912, Čabrinović returned to Sarajevo, where he found employment at another printing press. During this time, he participated in a workers' strike against his father's wishes. When he refused to disclose the strike leader's identity to the police, he was banished from Sarajevo for five years due to his anarchist activities. He then returned to Belgrade, following the intervention of friends and relatives, his banishment was lifted, allowing him to go back to Sarajevo later that year. There, he became a full-time union member and, in 1912, met Gavrilo Princip for the first time. In March 1913, Čabrinović left Sarajevo and took up work at a Slovene printing plant in Trieste. He later returned to Belgrade in October 1913.

=== Conspiracy and preparation ===
In early 1914, Čabrinović met Princip in Belgrade, where Princip was preparing for his eighth-year examination at the First Belgrade High School. While frequenting cafés popular among Bosnian expatriates and Chetnik veterans of the Balkan Wars, Čabrinović and Princip came across a newspaper article detailing the planned visit of Archduke Franz Ferdinand of Austria to Bosnia in June. Princip, already intent on an assassination, persuaded Čabrinović and Trifko Grabež, the 18-year-old son of a Serbian Orthodox priest, to join the plot to kill the Archduke during his official visit to Sarajevo.

Through Djulaga Bukovac, a Bosnian Muslim and former soldier, the conspirators were introduced to Milan Ciganović, another Bosnian veteran and an associate of the Black Hand, a secretive Serbian nationalist group responsible for the 1903 regicide of King Alexander I of Serbia. Ciganović then arranged a meeting with Major Vojislav Tankosić, a prominent Chetnik leader and a Black Hand member of Bosnian descent, who provided them with weapons and training in their use.

Towards the end of May 1914, Čabrinović, Princip, and Grabež left Belgrade, armed with five Browning pistols, six grenades, and cyanide pills. They were smuggled into Bosnia with assistance from Narodna Odbrana, a nationalist organisation with ties to Serbia's military intelligence. Čabrinović, instructed to travel separately, abandoned his pistol before crossing the border. Upon arriving in Sarajevo in early June, the group was reinforced by additional recruits. Under Princip's direction, his former roommate Danilo Ilić enlisted three more conspirators: Mehmed Mehmedbašić, a Bosnian Muslim carpenter, and two Bosnian Serb students, Cvjetko Popović, aged 18, and Vaso Čubrilović, aged 17.

== Assassination attempt ==
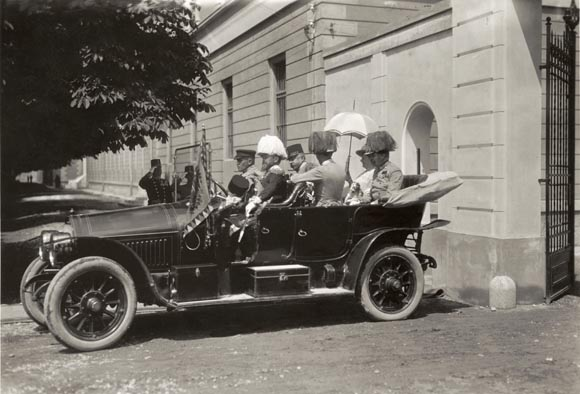
Archduke Franz Ferdinand and Duchess Sophie in their open-top car in Sarajevo on 28 June 1914, moments before the assassination attempt by Nedeljko Čabrinović.

On 28 June 1914, Archduke Franz Ferdinand of Austria and his wife, Duchess Sophie Chotek, arrived in Sarajevo by train shortly before 10 am. Their car was the third vehicle in a six-car motorcade en route to Sarajevo Town Hall. The convertible had its top rolled back to allow the public a clear view of its occupants. All six assassins were positioned along the route, each instructed to assassinate the Archduke when his car reached their location. The first conspirator, Muhamed Mehmedbašić, lost his nerve and allowed the car to pass without taking action. The second, Vaso Čubrilović, was armed with a bomb but also failed to act.

Čabrinović was next along the route. Just before 10:30 am, as the motorcade passed the central police station, he stood on the riverside of the boulevard and threw his M.12 Vasić hand grenade towards the Archduke's car. The bomb, which had a 10-second delay, bounced off the folded hood and detonated beneath the car behind, seriously injuring its two occupants, Eric von Merizzi and Count Alexander von Boos-Waldeck, as well as several people in the nearby crowd.

After throwing the grenade, Čabrinović swallowed a cyanide pill and jumped into the Miljacka River. The poison proved non-lethal, causing only foaming at the mouth and vomiting, while the river was only 4 inches (10 cm) deep due to the dry summer. Čabrinović was apprehended by bystanders and police and immediately taken to Sarajevo central police station.

After Čabrinović's arrest, the Archduke altered his itinerary to visit the wounded officers. As his car was en route, a wrong turn caused the vehicle to slow down in front of Princip. From a few feet away, Princip fired two shots, striking the Archduke in the jugular vein and Duchess Sophie in the abdomen. Both succumbed to their wounds within minutes.

== Trial and sentencing ==
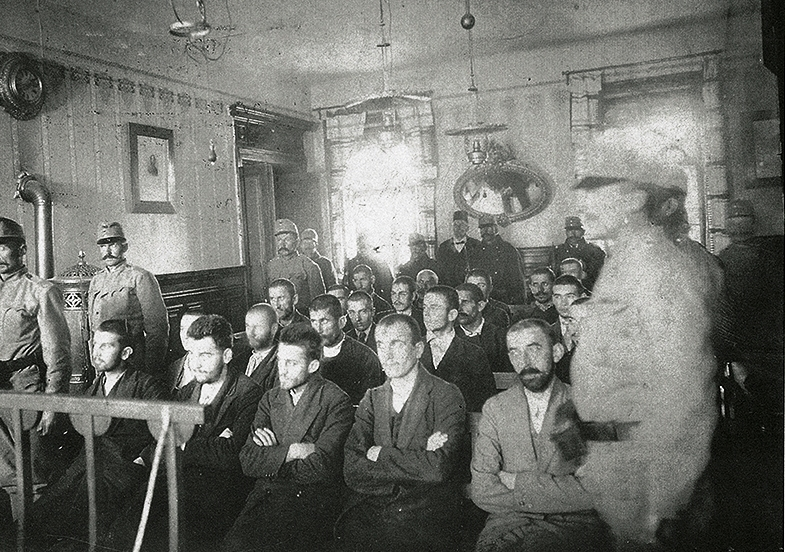
Čabrinović (front row, second from left) during the Sarajevo trial in late 1914, where he was convicted of high treason for his role in the assassination plot against Archduke Franz Ferdinand.

Following the assassination, Nedeljko Čabrinović was arrested along with twenty-four others, as the investigation identified six primary conspirators involved in the plot to kill Archduke Franz Ferdinand. On 28 October 1914, a Sarajevo court found Čabrinović and Gavrilo Princip guilty of high treason. During the trial, Čabrinović admitted to his role in the conspiracy and expressed remorse. He wrote a letter of apology to the Archduke's three children, who reportedly forgave him.

As he was under twenty-one, Čabrinović was spared the death penalty, along with Princip and Trifko Grabež, in accordance with Austro-Hungarian law. Instead, he was sentenced to twenty years of hard labour, the maximum penalty. His sentence also included one day per month without food or water and annual solitary confinement in total darkness on 28 June, the anniversary of the assassination.

Čabrinović's fellow conspirators received varying sentences. Vaso Čubrilović was sentenced to 16 years, while Cvjetko Popović received 13 years. Several others were executed, including Danilo Ilić, Veljko Čubrilović, and Miško Jovanović, who were hanged on 3 February 1915. Mehmed Mehmedbašić evaded capture and escaped to Montenegro.

== Imprisonment and death ==
While imprisoned, Čabrinović's health rapidly deteriorated due to cold, hunger, and prolonged solitary confinement. Towards the end of 1915, he was visited by the Austrian writer Franz Werfel, who later documented the encounter in his diary. Čabrinović died on 23 January 1916. He was among eight of the thirteen conspirators who perished in prison, largely due to the harsh and inhumane conditions of their incarceration.

Following World War I, his remains were exhumed and returned to Sarajevo, where he was interred alongside the other conspirators in a common grave at the Vidovdan Heroes Chapel.

== Sources ==
- Butcher, T. (2015). The Trigger: Hunting the Assassin Who Brought the World to War. Vintage Books. Vintage Publishing. ISBN 978-0-09-958133-8.
- Calic, M.J. (2019). The Great Cauldron: A History of Southeastern Europe. Harvard University Press. ISBN 978-0-674-98392-2.
- Dedijer, Vladimir (1966). The Road to Sarajevo. New York: Simon and Schuster. OCLC 400010.
- Fabijancic, T. (2010). Bosnia: In the Footsteps of Gavrilo Princip. Wayfarer. University of Alberta Press. ISBN 978-0-88864-753-5.
- Hastings, M. (2014). Catastrophe: Europe Goes to War 1914. William Collins. ISBN 978-0-00-751974-3.
- Hoskins, P.M. (2013). The Immigrants. Xlibris AU. ISBN 978-1-4931-0572-4.
- Mitrović, A. (2007). Serbia's Great War, 1914–1918. Central European studies. Purdue University Press. ISBN 978-1-55753-476-7.
- Owings, W. A. Dolph. (1984). The Sarajevo Trial. Chapel Hill, NC: Documentary Publications. ISBN 0-89712-122-8.
- "The Car That Witnessed the Spark of World War I". The New York Times. 2014-07-10.
- Sageman, M. (2017). Turning to Political Violence: The Emergence of Terrorism. University of Pennsylvania Press. ISBN 978-0-8122-4877-7.
- Zalar, C. (1961). Yugoslav Communism: A Critical Study. U.S. Government Printing Office.
