= 1905 Serbian parliamentary election =

- 10 July 1905
- All 160 seats in the National Assembly; 81 seats needed for a majority
Party	Leader	Vote %	Seats	+/–
SRS		36.56	81	+15
NRS	Nikola Pašić	30.15	55	−20
National		15.24	16	−1
Progressive		8.04	3	+2
SNSS		3.68	1	New
NS–SNS		0.96	2	New
SSDP		0.87	2	+1
This lists parties that won seats. See the complete results below.
Prime Minister before	Prime Minister after
Ljubomir Stojanović; Independent Radical Party	Ljubomir Stojanović; Independent Radical Party

Parliamentary elections were held in Serbia on 10 July 1905. The result was a victory for the Independent Radical Party, which won 81 of the 160 seats. Ljubomir Stojanović remained Prime Minister.

== Results ==
Party	Votes	%	Seats	+/–
Independent Radical Party	107,706	36.56	81	+15
People's Radical Party	88,834	30.15	55	–20
National Party	44,912	15.24	16	–1
Serbian Progressive Party	23,700	8.04	3	+2
Serbian National Peasant Accord	10,827	3.68	1	New
People's Radical dissidents	6,309	2.14	0	0
Independent Radical dissidents	5,423	1.84	0	0
National Party–Progressive coalition	2,817	0.96	2	–
Social Democratic Party	2,571	0.87	2	+1
Independent lists	1,503	0.51	0	0
Total	294,602	100.00	160	0
Registered voters/turnout	531,530	–		
Source: Slobodan Antonic
