= Vasić M12 =

Hand grenade designed in Serbia in 1912

- Type: Hand grenade
- Place of origin: Kingdom of Serbia

Service history
- In service: 1912-1945
- Used by: Kingdom of Serbia; Kingdom of Montenegro; Kingdom of Yugoslavia
- Wars: First Balkan War; Second Balkan War; World War I World War II

Production history
- Designed: 1912

Specifications
- Filling: black powder or Amatol
- Filling weight: 100–150 g
- Detonation mechanism: 5 second delay

The Vasić M-12 Grenade is a hand grenade that was designed in Serbia in 1912. It was adopted by Serbia and Montenegro in 1912. It also was in service with the Royal Yugoslav Army during World War II. In 1914, Nedeljko Cabrinovic, a member of the black hand, used an M12 Vasic grenade at the car in which Archduke Franz Ferdinand and his wife, Sophie were being driven through Sarajevo in 1914. The assassination attempt was unsuccessful as the delay on the bomb fuse was such that Ferdinand's car had passed by the danger before the device exploded.

== History ==
=== Bulgarian Hand Grenades ===
In 1895, the president of the newly established Macedonian Committee, Naum Tyufekchiev, formed the first workshop in Sofia for the production of primitive hand grenades intended for the Macedonian Revolutionary Organization. The bombs were filled with a mixture of 84% potassium chlorate and 16% powdered sugar, a glass ampoule with sulfuric acid served as the igniter.

The Bulgarian government denied Tufekchiev assistance in 1896 and closed the workshop. The weapon proved to be an excellent tool in guerrilla operations, and number of primitive workshops appeared throughout Macedonia. The bodies were cast from various materials, and were spherical, pear-shaped and cubic, with a chemical (sulfuric or nitric acid), percussion igniter or Bickford fuse.

The Bulgarian army officially became interested in this weapon in 1902, when experiments with different types of bombs were carried out in the Sofia Second Pioneer Battalion . Learning from the experiences of the Russo-Japanese War, in which grenades used on a large scale, on March 23, 1906, the Bulgarian Engineering Army Directorate on the production of 24,000 spherical bombs with grooves, 2,000 smooth- cubic bombs, and 2,000 cubic bombs with grooves from Tufekchiev.

=== Serbian Use ===
The Serbian Chetniks first learned about the construction of a hand grenade through the executive committee of the Serbian Chetnik Action in Vranje (founded on August 19, 1903). On August 29, 1903, a Chetnik detachment, allegedly under the command of Andjelko Aleksić, came into contact with the Bulgarian Skopje-Kumanovo Komite Company of Nikola Petkov Puškarov, the president of the Skopje Revolutionary Committee of the Internal Macedonian Revolutionary Organization, at Ovče Polje, near the Đuriš Monastery. The Bulgarians were threatened by Turkish pursuit and were transferred to Serbia; on August 30, they were stationed in Vranje and were received by Živojin Rafajlović.

Pushkarov trained the members of the Committee in making hand grenades during his seven-day stay in Vranje. Apparently, it was an older type of hand grenade, with a friction igniter (one end of the Bickford fuse was covered with red phosphorus that ignited by friction on an uneven surface).

A makeshift workshop was created in Vranje, in the basement of the house of Jančo Jovanović Baldžija. Tasa Nerandžić, owner of the Belgrade “Fabrik Sita i Žica”, supplied the committee with two graphite crucibles; former consul Todor Stanković and the local veterinarian Božidar Dragičević collected bronze in Niš for casting the grenades, while pharmacist Petar Kušaković supplied the workshop with potassium chlorate and powdered sugar. Locksmith Petar Miljković Pepek cast the grenades, which were filled with explosives by Lazar Ilijev, a wounded Bulgarian who remained in Vranje. The bombs were kept in the vault of the Vranje Monopoly Tobacco Supervision, under the key of district supervisor class Milan Graovac. According to the memoirs of Vasilije Trbić, this weapon was primitive and relatively weak.

=== M1904 Grenade ===
Several copies of these bombs were delivered to the Kragujevac Military Technical Institute, namely to the manager of the Pyrotechnic Workshop, Major Miodrag Vasić.

Vasić began making two basic prototypes – with cast iron bodies in the shape of a cube and a cuboid with an equilateral base Operatives objected that this shape was impractical to carry, so a new body in the shape of a flattened cuboid, with a rectangular base was made.

During 1904, the Pyrotechnics of the Kragujevac VTZ began producing hand grenades, known as the Kragujevac (Kragujevka) System, Vasić (Vasićka) or VTZ. The bomb body was cast in sand molds. After joining the halves, a hole was left at the upper end for screwing in the fuse, and a hole for filling with explosives was left at the lower end, which was closed with a cast iron plug.

The first prototype from 1904 was filled with 100 g of Serbian black powder . The brass, impact-pyrotechnic fuse was of simple construction; the M1904 bombs detonated after 10–11 seconds.

=== M1912 Grenade ===
Vasić modernized the bomb by 1912: the body was lightened, the circular support for the capsule outlet was made in the form of a vault with three semicircular cuts, and the combustion time of the propellant mixture was shortened to about 5 seconds. The throwing distance of the M1904 and M1912 bombs was about 25–30 m, with a blast radius up to 200 meters .

The grenades prove very useful during the First Balkan War, especially during the Siege of Adrianople.

Before the beginning of the Second Balkan War, General Stepa Stepanović ordered that bomb equipped squads (consisting of one non-commissioned officer and 16 soldiers each.) should be formed in all companies of the 4t 3th, 14th, 15th and 20th Infantry Regiments of the Timočka Division.

By the beginning of the First World War, the VTZ pyrotechnic department had a daily production of 800 grenades, which increased number to 1,000 units. In the absence of schneiderite, TNT was used for the basic charge (otherwise intended for 120 mm shells) alongside confiscated Austrian ammonal as well as French Cheddite.

Albert Charles Wratislaw, described in his memoirs how in 1915 a British naval officer transported four bags of Serbian hand grenades from Belgrade to Athens with the aim of testing them at the Dardanelles.
