= September 1903 Serbian parliamentary election =

- 21 September 1903
- All 160 seats in the National Assembly; 81 seats needed for a majority
Party	Leader	Vote %	Seats
NRS	Nikola Pašić	35.99	75
SRS	Ljubomir Živković	33.28	66
National	Stojan Ribarac	17.75	17
Progressive	Stojan Novaković	5.99	1
SSDP	Dragiša Lapčević	0.99	1
This lists parties that won seats. See the complete results below.
Prime Minister before	Prime Minister after
Jovan Avakumović; Liberal Party	Sava Grujić; NRS

Parliamentary elections were held in Serbia on 21 September [O.S. 8 September] 1903. Following the elections, Sava Grujić of the People's Radical Party formed a government in coalition with several independents.

== Results ==
Party	Votes	%	Seats
People's Radical Party	95,883	35.99	75
Independent Radical Party	88,650	33.28	66
National Party	47,298	17.75	17
Serbian Progressive Party	15,958	5.99	1
Independent Radical dissidents	8,644	3.24	0
People's Radical dissidents	6,159	2.31	0
Social Democratic Party	2,627	0.99	1
Independent lists	1,181	0.44	0
Total	266,400	100.00	160
Registered voters/turnout	503,385	–	
Source: Slobodan Antonic
