= Serbia and Albania =

Serbia and Albania: A Contribution to the Critique of the Conqueror Policy of the Serbian Bourgeoisie
- book cover
- Author: Dimitrije Tucović
- Language: Serbian
- Subject: the Serbian-Albanian conflict
- Publication place: Kingdom of Serbia
- Media type: book

Serbia and Albania: A Contribution to the Critique of the Conqueror Policy of the Serbian Bourgeoisie is a book by Serbian socialist Dimitrije Tucović, in which he analyzes the roots of Serbian-Albanian conflict.

After the outbreak of the Balkan Wars 1912, Tucović was mobilized in the Serbian Army and participated in the Serbian military campaign in Albania. He sent letters from the front about war crimes against the Albanian population which were regularly published in the Worker's Newspaper (Radničke novine). After returning from the Balkan war, he published Serbia and Albania in which he criticizes the militaristic policy of the Serbian bourgeoisie:

Unlimited enmity of the Albanian people against Serbia is the foremost real result of the Albanian policies of the Serbian government. The second and more dangerous result is the strengthening of two big powers in Albania, which have the greatest interests in the Balkans.

== Reviews ==
Some consider the book to be "among the most important Marxist contributions on the national question in the Balkans".
