= 1912 Serbian parliamentary election =

- 1 April 1912
- All 166 seats in the National Assembly; 81 seats needed for a majority
Party	Leader	Vote %	Seats	+/–
NRS		39.75	84	0
SRS		24.91	41	−7
NS–SNS		15.80	18	+1
National		5.10	9	+2
SSDP		5.37	2	+1
NRS dissidents		4.08	7	+7
Progressive		3.20	5	+2
This lists parties that won seats. See the complete results below.
Prime Minister before	Prime Minister after
Milovan Milovanović; People's Radical Party	Milovan Milovanović; People's Radical Party

Parliamentary elections were held in Serbia on 1 April 1912. The result was a victory for the ruling People's Radical Party, which won 84 of the 160 seats in the National Assembly.

== Results ==
Party	Votes	%	Seats	+/–
People's Radical Party	182,479	39.75	84	0
Independent Radical Party	114,345	24.91	41	–7
National Party–Progressive coalition	72,509	15.80	18	+1
National Party	23,411	5.10	9	+2
Social Democratic Party	24,665	5.37	2	+1
People's Radical dissidents	18,744	4.08	7	+7
Serbian Progressive Party	14,679	3.20	5	+2
Independent Radical dissidents	5,561	1.21	0	0
National Party dissidents	703	0.15	0	New
Independent lists	1,928	0.42	0	0
Total	459,024	100.00	166	+6
Registered voters/turnout	670,746	–		
Source: Slobodan Antonic
