= Užice Gymnasium =

- Ужичка гимназија Užička gimnazija
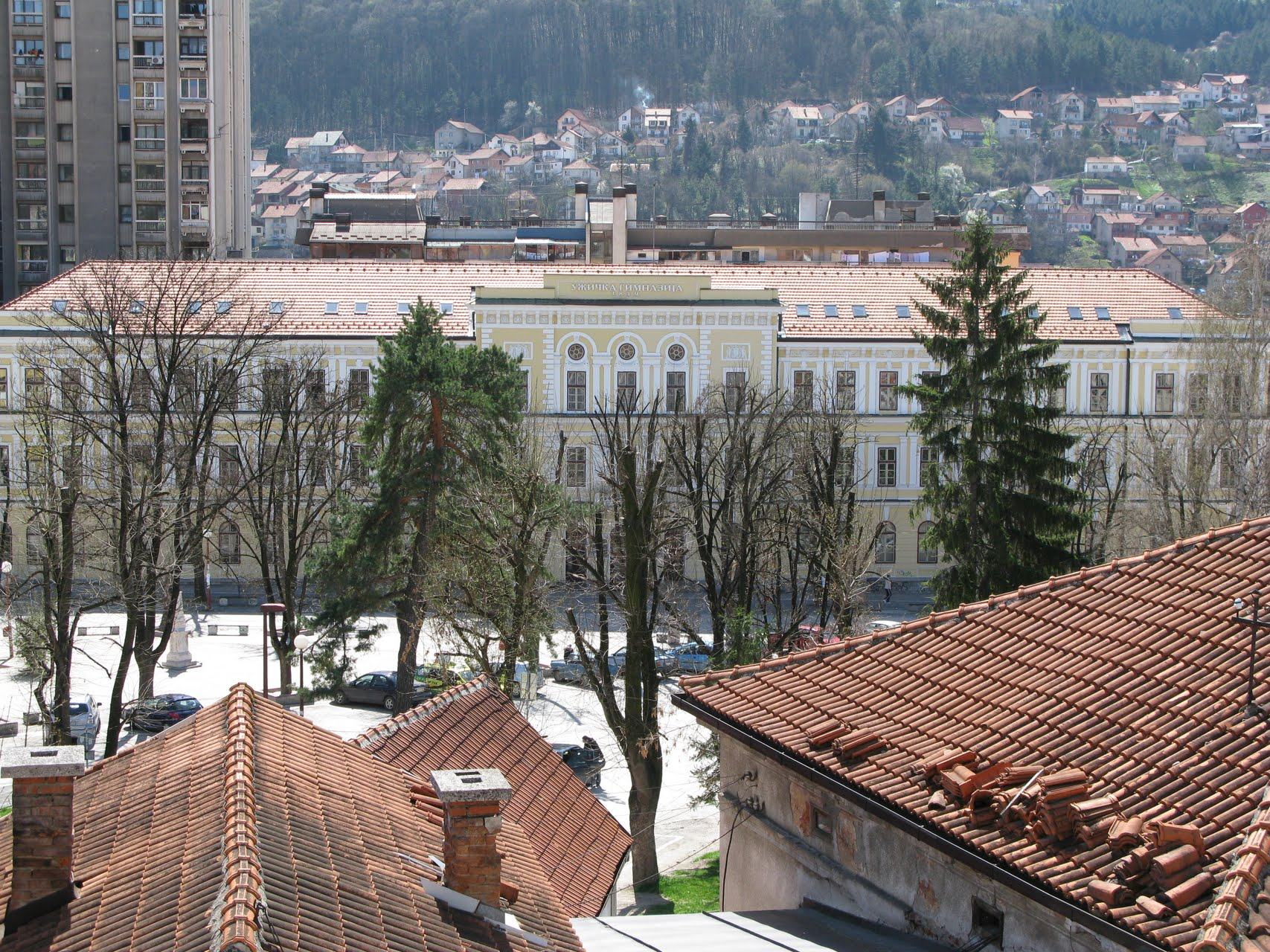

Location
- Saint Sava Square 6 Užice; Serbia
- Coordinates: 43.855697°N 19.843544°E

Information
- School type: Public, comprehensive high school
- Established: 9 September 1839; 186 years ago
- Status: Open
- Classes: 6
- Average class size: 30
- Language: Serbian
- Song: Gaudeamus igitur
- Website: UzickaGimnazija.edu.rs

Gymnasium of Užice (Serbian: Ужичка гимназија, romanized: Užička gimnazija) is a secondary school in Užice, Serbia.

== Early history ==
Construction of the school began in 1838, there being a serious interest among Užice craftsmen and traders for the development of education in the city. The school opened in 1839 and the only professor was Milan Mijatovic. The curriculum included katehizis, Serbian grammar, vsemirnu (general) history, mathematics zemljopisanije, čislenicu (account), jestastvenu history (natural history) and nemecki textbook (German language).

In September 1842, as a result of the efforts of Bishop Užice, Nikephoros Maksimovic passed a decree which resulted in the closure of the school. The Užičani spent the next twenty-three years fighting for the re-opening of the gymnasium. On 9 June 1865, a decree was published on the reopening of the school. The first classes were held in 1865/66.

The period between 1862 and 1880 represented a "golden age" for Užice, which probably influenced the decision of the Minister of Education that from 1874 that in Užice dvorazredna Gimnazijska realka into Polugimnaziju, and already in 1881 it had grown into a full Real Gymnasium.

=== The first graduating generation ===
A photograph exists of the first generation of high school graduates from 1888. They are members of the reviewing committee including the Dobrosav Ruzic, professor and poet.

At that time classes were held in five separate buildings of which four were unfit to be used as classrooms. There was an obvious need for new, modern school buildings and better facilities.

== New building ==
When the foundations of the new buildings were laid in 1891, Realke Ljubomir Simovic in Užice wrote:

July 29, 1891, when they are at the Square of St. George, across from the Cathedral, officially laid the foundation for building the high school. The Užičani, by their old custom, celebrated by ringing bells and firing guns (prangija).

Two years later, in September 1893, at a ceremony in which the whole town participated, the architect, Venceslav Čihak and the contractor, Lika Mileticwith handed over the keys of the newly built grammar school to its director, Peter Zivkovic. The Užičani celebrated with their guns, prangijama and orchestras. The facade of the new school was inscribed in gold letters with "Kr. Aug. Realka".

== Curriculum ==
Students enrolling in the 1990/1991 school year had a new secondary school curriculum which included such specialisms as socio-linguistics and mathematical/natural sciences. Only minor changes to the curriculum have taken place since then.

== Notable alumni ==
- Ljubomir Davidović, politician
- Dragiša M. Djurić, academic
- Miloš Perović, writer
- Nastas Petrović, politician
- Simeon Roksandić, sculptor
- Ljubomir Stojanović, statesman, politician, philologist and academic
- Milutin Uskoković, novelist
