= Nikojevići =

Coordinates: 43°44′57″N 19°51′06″E

- Village
- Interactive map of Nikojevići
- Country: Serbia
- Time zone: UTC+1 (CET)
  - Summer (DST): UTC+2 (CEST)

Nikojevići (Serbian Cyrillic: Никојевићи) is a village located in the Užice municipality of Serbia. In the 2011 census, the village had a population of 366.
