= Dimitrije Tucović =

Serbian theorist

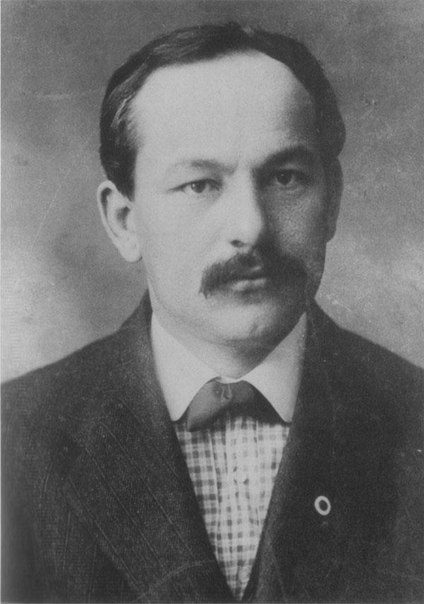
- Tucović in 1910
- Born: 13 May 1881; Gostilje, Serbia
- Died: 20 November 1914 (aged 33); Vrače Brdo, Serbia
- Resting place: New Cemetery, Belgrade, Serbia
- Education: University of Belgrade
- Occupations: Editor, journalist, politician, soldier, theorist
- Political party: Social Democratic
- Movement: Socialism
- Military career
- Allegiance: Kingdom of Serbia
- Branch: Royal Serbian Army
- Service years: 1912–1914
- Rank: Captain
- Nickname: Mita
- Conflicts: Balkan Wars; World War I; Battle of Kolubara
- Memorials: Dimitrije Tucović Square

Dimitrije "Mita" Tucović (Serbian Cyrillic: Димитрије Туцовић, Serbian pronunciation: [dimǐtrije tûːtsoʋitɕ]; 13 May 1881 – November 1914) was a Serbian theorist of the socialist movement, politician, writer and publisher. He was founder of the Serbian Social Democratic Party.

Tucović devoted his entire life to fighting for workers' and human rights, gender equality, universal suffrage, social justice and civil liberties in the Kingdom of Serbia. Some of the ideas that he advocated as a pioneer, today are widely accepted values in contemporary Republic of Serbia.

== Life ==
Tucović was born 13 May 1881 in the Gostilje village on Mount Zlatibor, near Čajetina. His brother was Vladimir Tucović, a lieutenant colonel in the Royal Serbian Army.

He was already an adherent to socialist ideas when he came to Belgrade in 1899 to finish high school after previously spending six years in Užice. In 1901, the Belgrade Workers' Society was renewed and Tucović recreated a socialist group of gymnasium students and became one of the leaders of the Society. He attempted to create modern unions.

In 1902 he organised student demonstrations in the Senate against Nikola Pašić. With Tucović's and colleague Radovan Dragović's help, the "Panel for Movement Leadership" was created again and they made the "Central Committee", with a goal of setting the grounds for creating a party. Tucović led the March demonstrations against King Aleksandar Obrenović on 5 March 1903. He was forced to emigrate to Zemun in the neighbouring Austria-Hungary and later to Vienna.

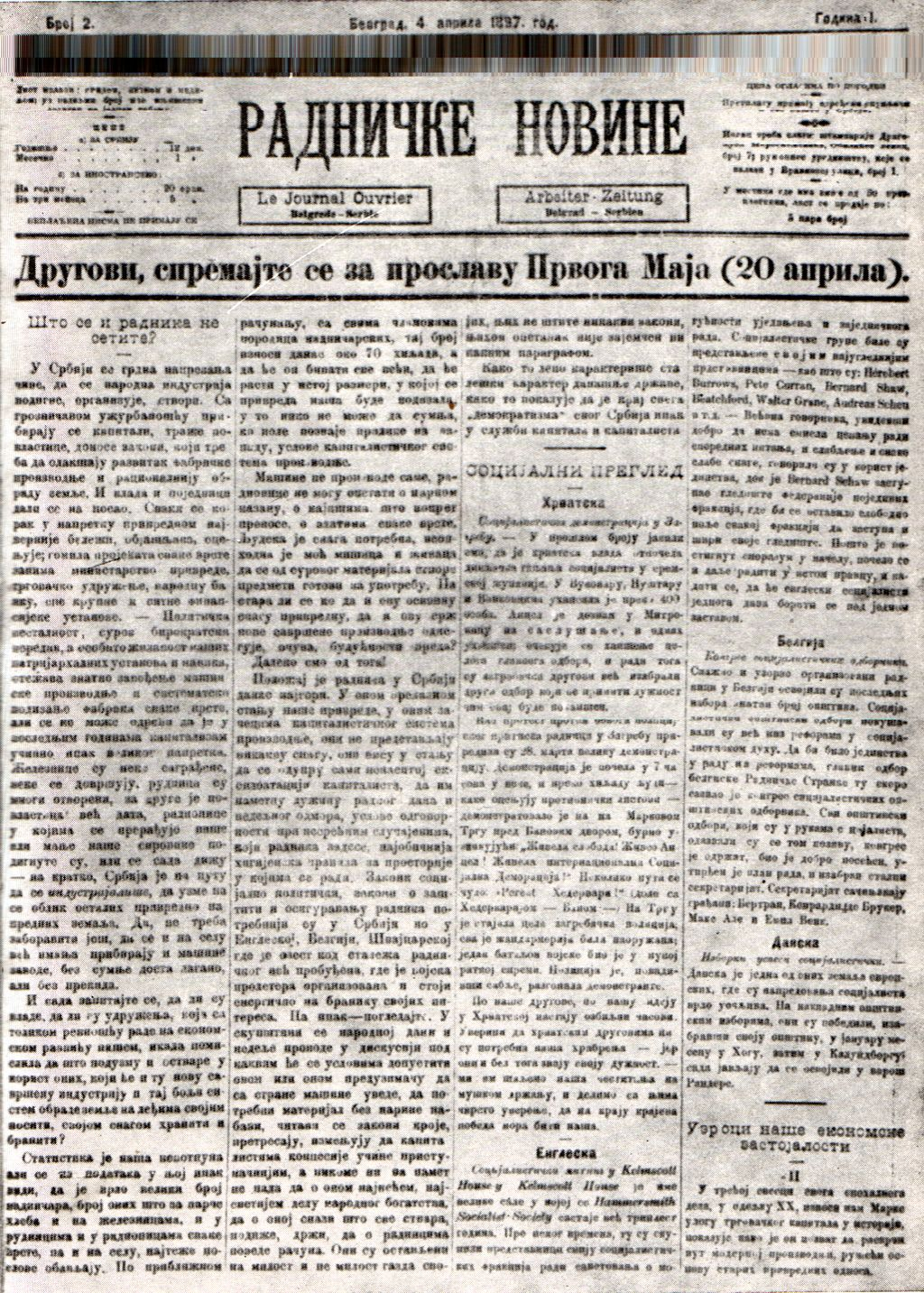
Radničke novine (Worker's Newspaper) from 1897.

On 2 August 1903, the Social-Democratic Party was formed, with Tucović and Dragiša Lapčević as one of the leaders. The editor of their newspaper, "Worker's Newspaper" was Tucović. During the Second Congress of a workers union SSDP (1904), Tucović gave a lecture on union organisations. Tucović confronted Dragiša Lapčević, who adopted centralist and right-wing opportunist positions.

In 1906, he graduated from the University of Belgrade's Law School. After coming back from Berlin, he gave up on his doctorate and started spending his time in socialist and labour movement, as a secretary of the SSDP. The SSDP was modeled upon German Social Democracy.

Tucović was the organizer and leader of the first Balkan Socialist Conference, held in Belgrade from 7-9. January 1910, aimed at creating a Balkan federation.

Grouping and mutuality of countries and peoples in the Balkans is the only road that leads to economic, national and political liberation.

In 1910, the party established a theory magazine Borba – Tucović was the editor. He participated at the International Socialist Congress in Copenhagen the same year and gave an important speech criticizing the position that Austrian social-democrats took on the national issue, especially the Austro-Hungarian annexation of Bosnia and Herzegovina. In a debate with Karl Renner he pointed out the colonial-enslaving politics of Austro-Hungary and the fact that social-democrats were supporting the government on the issue.

After the outbreak of the Balkan Wars 1912, he was mobilized in the Royal Army and participated in the Serbian military campaign in Albania. He sent letters from the front about war crimes against civil population which were regularly published in the Worker's Newspaper. Writing of the massacres of Albanians during the Serbian takeover of Kosovo from Turkey (1912), he stated:

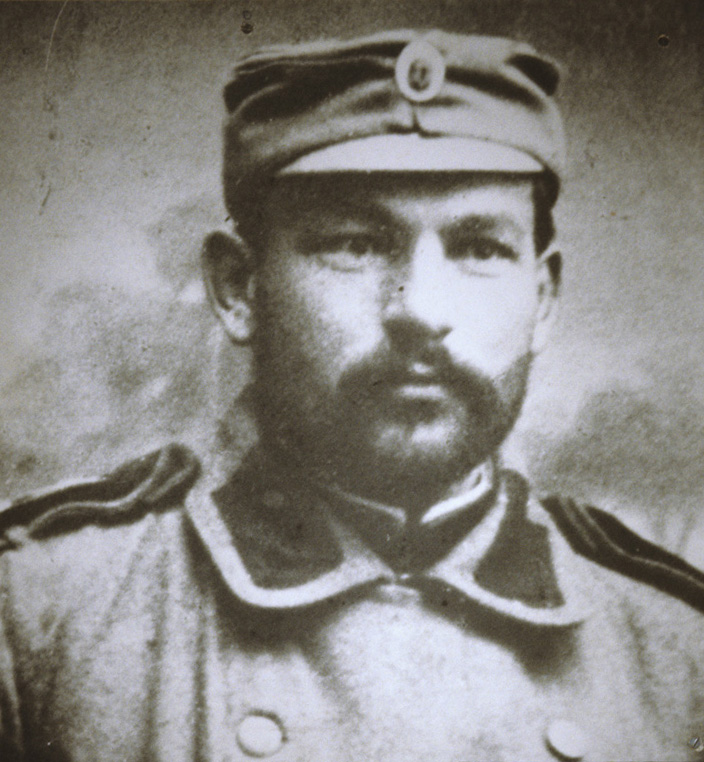
Captain Dimitrije Tucović

We have carried out the attempted premeditated murder of an entire nation. We were caught in that criminal act and have been obstructed. Now we have to suffer the punishment.... In the Balkan Wars, Serbia not only doubled its territory, but also its external enemies.

After returning from the Balkan War, he published his influential book Serbia and Albania: A Contribution to the Critique of the Conqueror Policy of the Serbian Bourgeoisie, which analyzes the roots of Serbian-Albanian conflict and consider "among the most important Marxist contributions on the national question in the Balkans".

He died on the frontlines in World War I at Vrače brdo. He died as a member of Morava division in November 1914 in a Battle of Kolubara against Austro-Hungarian army at Ljig's bank. In 1915, Leon Trotsky wrote about the political impact of his death:

How many harbingers of the Balkan Federation have fallen in the wars of the last years! The heaviest blow for Serbian and all Balkan social-democracy in the war was the fate of Dimitrije Tucovic who was one of the noblest and most heroic figures of the Serbian workers' movement.

The Slavija Square in Belgrade was renamed in Tucović's honor in 1947 until the early 2000s, when it was changed back to Slavija. He has streets named after him in Skopje, Užice, Belgrade, Kragujevac, and many other cities and towns of former Yugoslavia.

== Selected works ==
- Union Organization (Sindikalne organizacije) 1904.
- Unions and Party (Sindikati i partija) 1904.
- Austria-Hungary in the Balkans (Austro-Ugarska na Balkanu) 1908.
- Labor Law and Social Democracy (Zakon o radnjama i socijalna demokratija) 1908.
- The labor movement in Serbia (Radnički pokret u Srbiji) 1909.
- Balkan Conference (Balkanska konferencija) 1910.
- First Balkan Social Democratic Conference (Prva balkanska socijaldemokratska konferencija) 1910.
- The Albanian question (Albansko pitanje) 1910.
- War and Peace (Rat i mir) 1910.
- Women's liberation (Oslobođenje žene) 1910.
- Tactics and action (Taktika i akcija) 1910.
- Bourgeois and proletarian Serbia (Buržoaska i proleterska Srbija) 1911.
- Marx and Slavs (Marks i Sloveni) 1911.
- Serbia and Albania (Srbija i Arbanija) 1914.
