= 1906 Serbian parliamentary election =

- 11 June 1906
- All 160 seats in the National Assembly; 81 seats needed for a majority
Party	Leader	Vote %	Seats	+/–
NRS	Nikola Pašić	42.65	91	+36
SRS		29.25	47	−34
National		12.49	15	−1
Progressive		7.97	5	+2
NS–SNS		3.06	1	−1
SSDP		0.91	1	−1
This lists parties that won seats. See the complete results below.
Prime Minister before	Prime Minister after
Nikola Pašić; NRS	Nikola Pašić; NRS

Parliamentary elections were held in Serbia on 11 June 1906. The result was a victory for the People's Radical Party, which won 91 of the 160 seats. Nikola Pašić remained Prime Minister.

== Results ==
Party	Votes	%	Seats	+/–
People's Radical Party	157,857	42.65	91	+36
Independent Radical Party	108,258	29.25	47	–34
National Party	46,238	12.49	15	–1
Serbian Progressive Party	29,512	7.97	5	+2
National Party–Progressive coalition	11,338	3.06	1	–1
Serbian National Peasant Accord	9,494	2.56	0	–1
Social Democratic Party	3,381	0.91	1	–1
Independent Radical dissidents	1,068	0.29	0	0
People's Radical dissidents	851	0.23	0	0
Independent lists	2,151	0.58	0	0
Total	370,148	100.00	160	0
Registered voters/turnout	547,392	–		
Source: Slobodan Antonic
