= Gostilje =

- Village
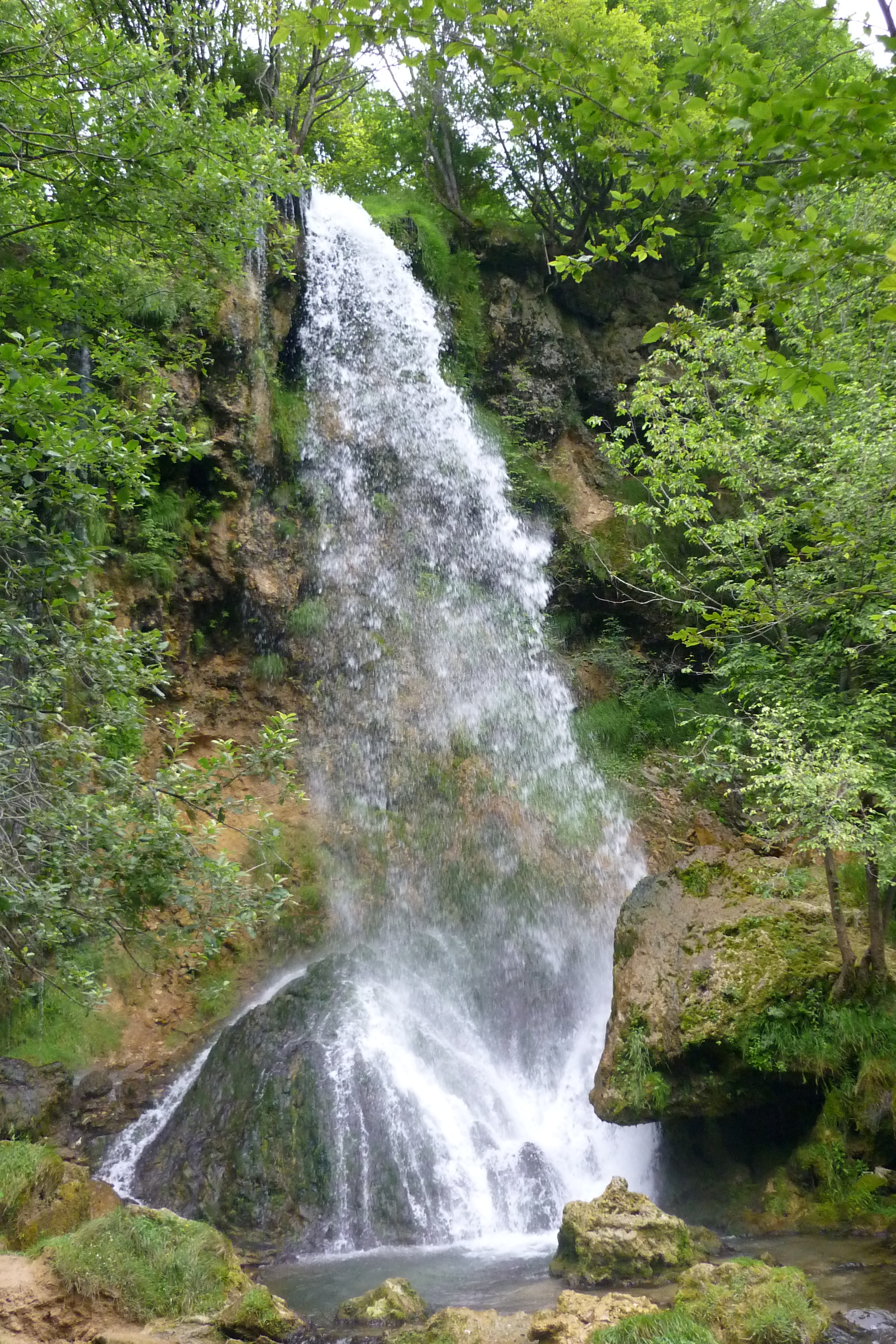
- Gostilje Waterfalls

- Location within Serbia
- Coordinates: 43°39′N 19°49′E
- Country: Serbia
- District: Zlatibor District
- Municipality: Čajetina

Area
  - Total: 22.19 km^{2} (8.57 sq mi)
- Elevation: 867 m (2,844 ft)

Population (2011)
  - Total: 242
  - Density: 10.9/km^{2} (28.2/sq mi)
- Time zone: UTC+1 (CET)
  - Summer (DST): UTC+2 (CEST)

Gostilje is a village in the municipality of Čajetina, western Serbia. According to the 2011 census, the village has a population of 242 people.
