= Dragiša Lapčević =

Serbian politician, journalist, and historian

Dragiša Lapčević Драгиша Лапчевић
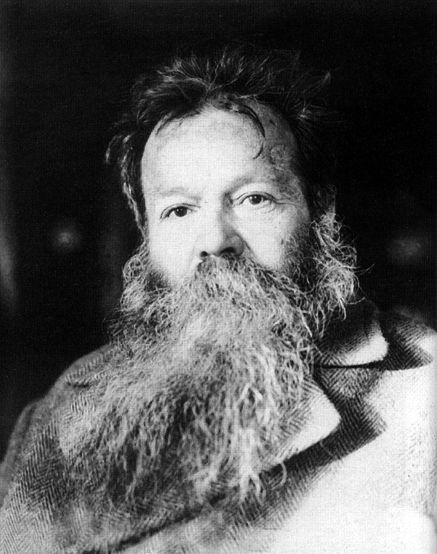

Member of the National Assembly
- In office 1905–1908
- In office 1912–1919

Personal details
- Born: 27 October 1867
- Died: 14 August 1939 (aged 71)
- Party: Serbian Social Democratic Party

Dragutin "Dragiša" Lapčević (Serbian Cyrillic: Драгутин "Драгиша" Лапчевић; 27 October 1867 – 14 August 1939) was a Serbian politician, journalist, and historian. He was one of the founders, alongside Dimitrije Tucović, of the Serbian Social Democratic Party (existed 1903–1918), that supported a Balkan Federation during the Kingdom of Serbia.

== Life ==
Dragiša was born in Užice in 1867. The family moved to Požega when Lapčević was the age of three or four. There he completed his grammar school education, after which he continued to educate himself by attending lectures in political science and economics and reading smuggled socialist material into the Kingdom of Serbia at a time when Anti-Socialist Laws were instituted. Initially, he worked as an unskilled laborer, first in a bakery and in a mechanic shop. Later, he was appointed as a municipal clerk. There he gained a reputation as a brilliant public speaker and was elected president of the municipal opposition in 1893, but the Serbian government annulled it. Influenced by Svetozar Marković, he supported the ideas of Karl Kautsky and opposed those of Georgi Plekhanov.

In polemics with the left wing of the party, headed by Dimitrije Tucović, Lapčević often adopted centrist and right-opportunist positions. From 1905 to 1908 and again from 1912 to 1919, he was a deputy in the Skupština, where he won a great international reputation by voting against war budgets ahead of the Balkan Wars of 1912–13 and World War I, advocating a Balkan Federation. In the post-war period, he refused to join the Bolsheviks. He was an opponent of Bolshevik influence in the workers' movement of the then Yugoslavia.

From 20 to 23 April 1919, delegates from Social democratic parties of Serbia, Bosnia and Herzegovina, Vojvodina, Montenegro, Croatia-Slavonia and Macedonia met to found the Socialist Workers' Party of Yugoslavia which immediately joined the Communist International against the advice of Lapčević. At the organization's Second Congress held in Vukovar from 20 to 24 June 1920, the less radically inclined centrist faction were led by Lapčević and Žarko Topalović; they were expelled from the party in November of the same year for issuing an anti-Bolshevik manifesto. In 1921 Dragiša Lapčević was one of the organizers of the reformist Socialist Party of Yugoslavia. In the early 1920s, Lapčević left politics and withdrew from the workers' movement, not wanting to take further part in the polemics of the opposing parties.

He was the author of many works on ethnology and the history of the economy and the workers’ movement in Serbia, among them The History of Socialism in Serbia (1922). He was a staunch opposer of Greater Serbia.

== Major works ==
- Istorija socijalizma u Srbiji (History of Socialism in Serbia, 1922)
- Rat i srpska socijalna demokratija (War and Serbian Social Democracy, 1925)
- Položaj radničke klase u Srbiji (Position of the Working Class in Serbia, 1928)
