= Serbian Social Democratic Party (Kingdom of Serbia) =

Left-wing political party in the Kingdom of Serbia

Serbian Social Democratic Party Српска социјалдемократска партија
- Leader: Dragiša Lapčević; Dimitrije Tucović; Dušan A. Popović
- Founded: 2 August 1903
- Dissolved: 25 April 1919
- Merged into: SRPJ(k)
- Newspaper: Radničke novine (The Workers' Journal)
- Ideology: Social democracy; Marxism; Antimilitarism
- Political position: Left-wing to far-left
- International affiliation: Second International

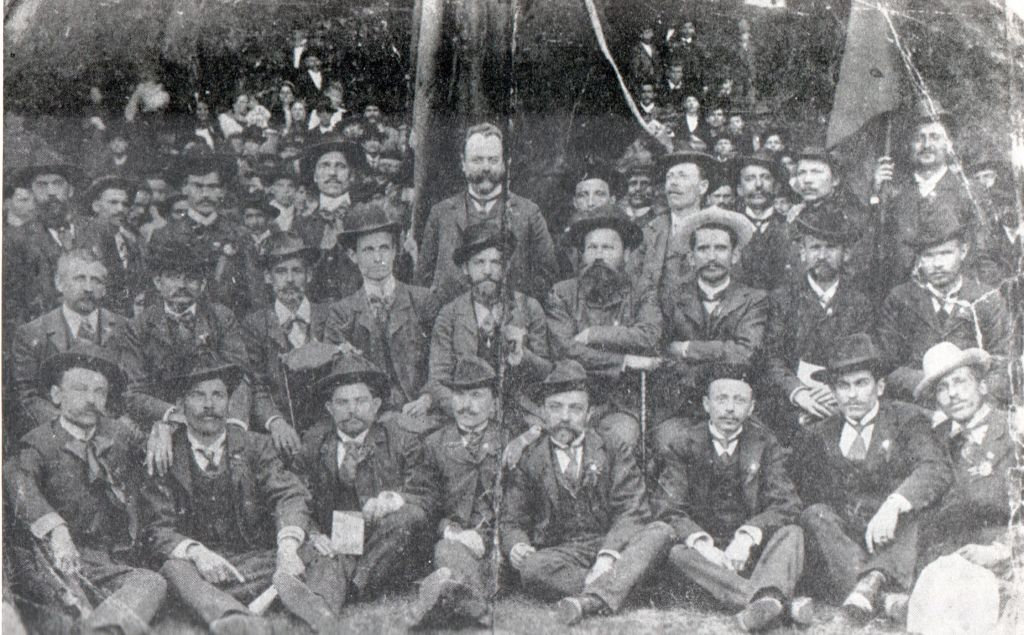
Members of the party shown at a May Day celebration in 1905.

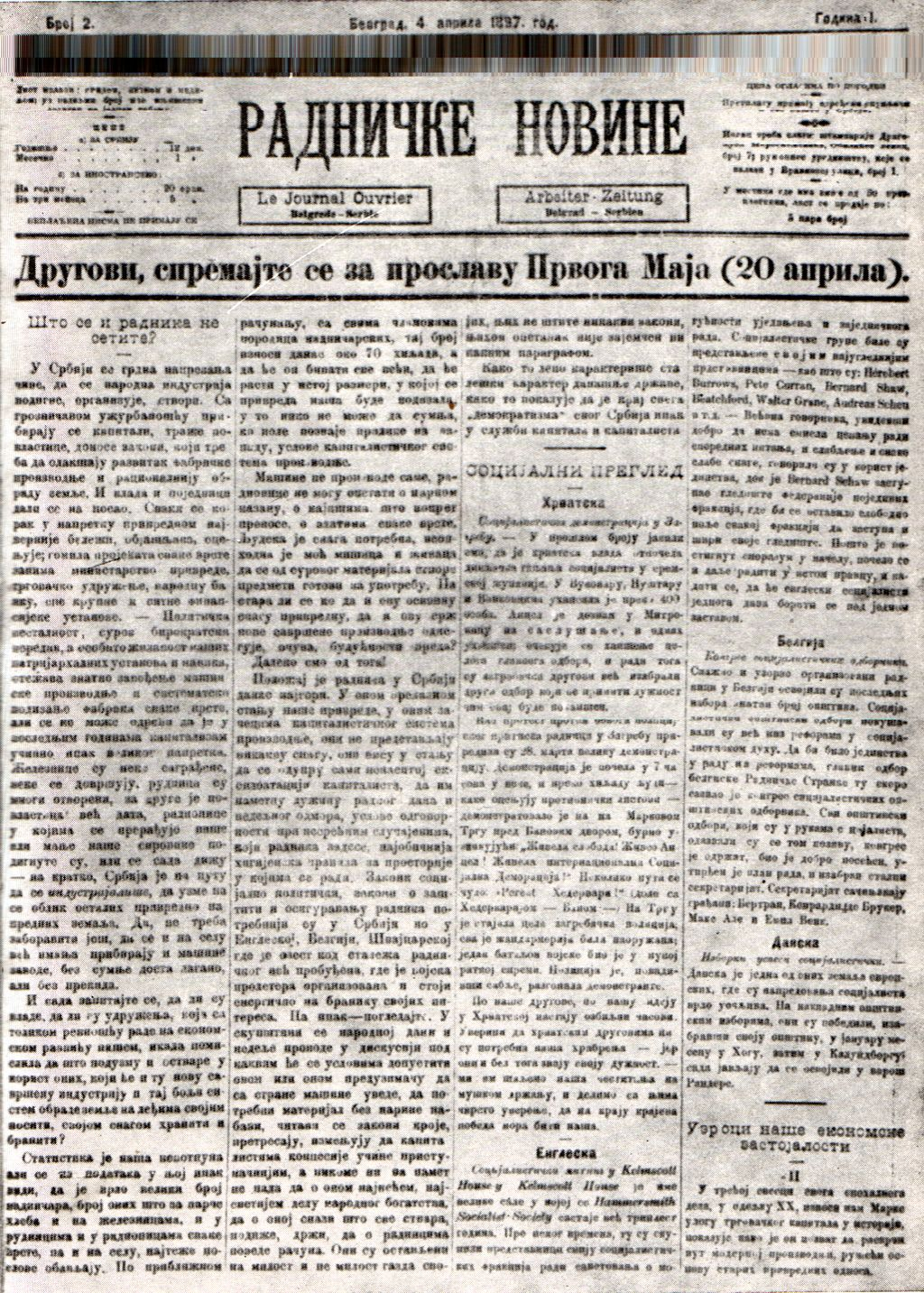
The party was organized around a paper called Radničke novine (the Workers' Journal)

The Serbian Social Democratic Party (Serbian: Српска социјалдемократска партија, romanized: Srpska socijaldemokratska partija; abbr. ССДП or SSDP), also known simply as the Serbian Socialist Party was a left-wing political party in Kingdom of Serbia that was formed in 1903. Prominent leaders included Dimitrije Tucović, Dragiša Lapčević, and Dušan A. Popović.

It ceased to exist after World War I with the creation of the Kingdom of Serbs, Croats and Slovenes, when in 1919 the social democrats joined the new Socialist Workers' Party of Yugoslavia (of Communists) (Socijalistička radnička partija Jugoslavije (komunista)), the predecessor of the Communist Party of Yugoslavia.

== History ==
The Serbian Social Democratic Party was founded on 2 August 1903 in Belgrade. The founding congress adopted a program modeled after the Erfurt Program of the German Social Democratic Party.

In 1903 a split emerged within the SSDP between the Marxists, led by Radovan Dragović and Dimitrije Tucović, and the so-called "opportunists", who insisted on the primacy of trade unionism over political struggle. In December 1904 the opportunists were expelled from the party.

In 1909 and 1910 the Marxist wing struggled against the anarcho-syndicalist wing.

The SSDP participated in the First Balkan Socialist Conference held on 7–9 January 1910 in Belgrade.

At the outbreak of World War I the Social Democratic deputies to the National Assembly refused to vote for war credits. The mobilization and the Austro-Hungarian occupation of the Kingdom of Serbia from October 1915 weakened the SSDP. During the revolutionary upswing that occurred in Serbia under the influence of the October Revolution, the SSDP merged with the Socialist Workers’ Party of Yugoslavia (of Communists) at the latter’s first (Unification) Congress, held in April 1919.

== Electoral performance ==
Year	Popular vote	% of popular vote	# of seats	Seat change	Government
1903	2,627	0.99%	1 / 160	▲1	opposition
1905	2,571	0.87%	2 / 160	▲1	opposition
1906	3,381	0.91%	1 / 160	▼1	opposition
1908	3,043	0.76%	1 / 160	Steady	opposition
1912	24,665	5.37%	2 / 166	▲1	opposition
