= Ljubomir Stojanović =

Serbian politician, philologist and academic

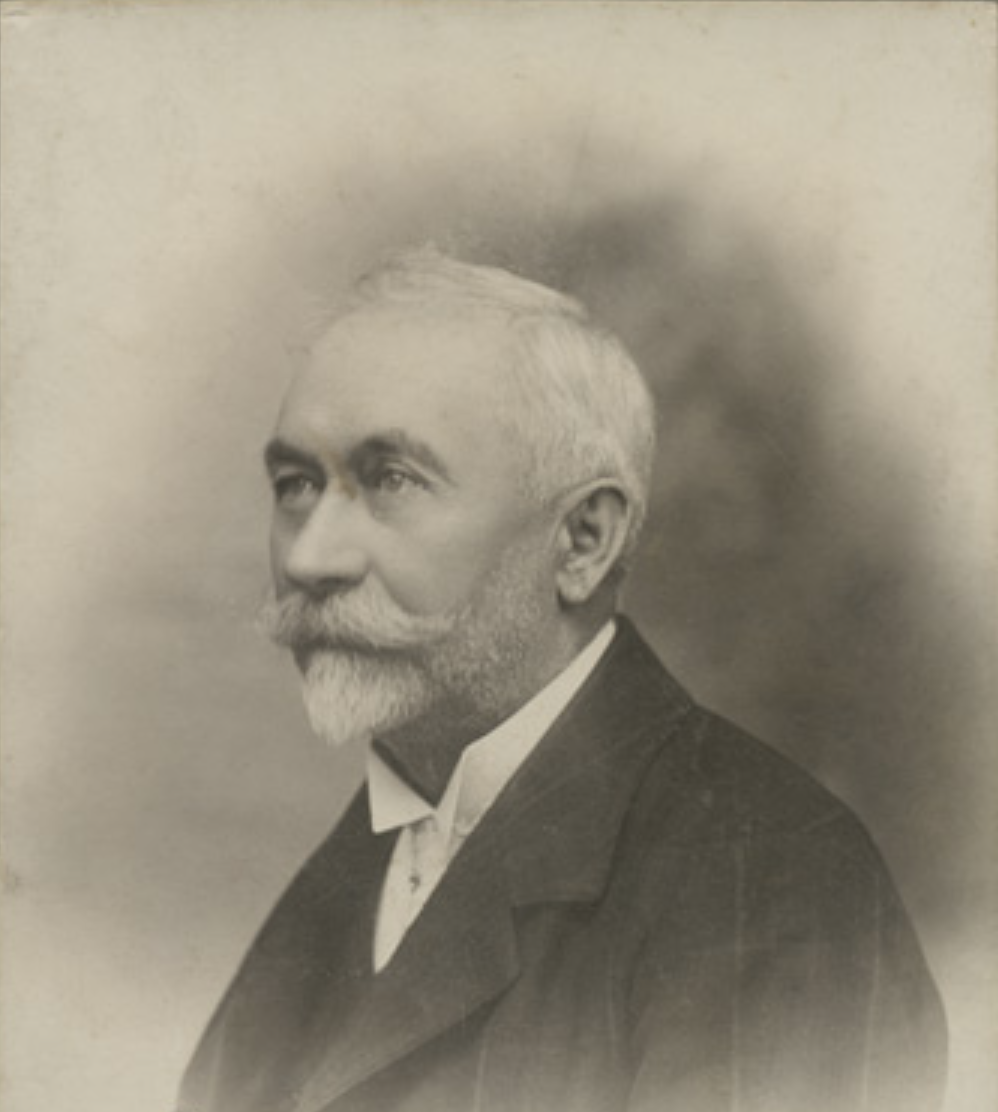
- Born: 6 August 1860; Užice, Principality of Serbia
- Died: 16 June 1930 (aged 69); Belgrade, Kingdom of Yugoslavia
- Occupations: politician, philologist, author, professor

Signature
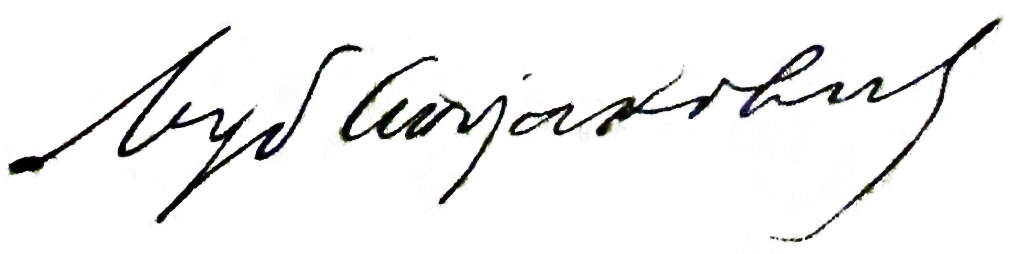

Ljubomir Stojanović (Serbian Cyrillic: Љубомир Стојановић, sometimes mentioned as Ljuba Stojanovic) (6 August 1860 – 16 June 1930) was a Serbian politician, philologist and academic.

== Biography ==
He was born in Užice. Stojanović was a philologist and historian, who graduated from the School of Philosophy at the Velika škola in Belgrade. Afterwards he went on to post-graduate studies in Vienna, St. Petersburg and Leipzig. At first a grammar school professor, he was appointed university professor at his alma mater, the Velika škola (1891-1899). Opposed to the royal absolutism of King Aleksandar I Obrenović, Stojanović joined the People's Radical Party of Nikola Pašić in 1897.

After the split with the older generation of Radicals who accepted the compromise with the Crown in 1901, Stojanović led the younger group of Radicals, forming the Independent Radical Party (Samostalna radikalna stranka). As a founding member and a leader of the Independent Radical Party in Serbia, Stojanović was several times Minister of Education and Religious Affairs (1903, 1904, 1906, 1909), and Prime Minister from May 1905 to March 1906, under the democratic and constitutional rule of King Peter I Karađorđević.

After the First World War Stojanović was one of the founders of the Yugoslav Republican Party and its first president. Stojanović was often described as a puritan moralist in politics.

From 1913 to 1923 he was Secretary of the Serbian Royal Academy, future Serbian Academy of Sciences and Arts. Stojanović was very prolific in various scientific fields, publishing a dozen volumes of medieval Serbian manuscripts and documents including Miroslavljevo Jevandjelje (Miroslav Gospel), and Stari srpski zapisi i natpisi (Old Serbian inscriptions and records) (in six volumes), along with medieval Serbian charters and letters as well as medieval Serbian genealogies and annals. Stojanović published the catalogues of medieval Serbian manuscripts and old books in the National Library of Serbia in Belgrade as well as the catalogue of manuscript collection at the Serbian Royal Academy.

A scholar of erudition, energy and determination, Stojanović published 17 volumes of works of Vuk St. Karadžić, the main reformer of the Serbian alphabet, including several volumes of his correspondence. He also wrote a detailed biography on Karadžić. Stojanović wrote grammar textbooks for Serbian secondary schools, published scholarly studies of old Serbian printing MA, Serbian churches from 15th to 16th century, the Archbishop Danilo II (Serbian: Архиепископ Данило II).

== Selected works ==
- Lekcije iz srpskoga jezika za I razred gimnazije, sastavio Ljub. Stojanović, Belgrade, u Državnoj štampariji kraljevine Srbije, 1891.
- Katalog rukopisa i starih štampanih knjiga, zbirka Srpske Kraljevske Akademije, sast. Ljub. Stojanović, Srpska kraljevska akademija, Belgrade, Državna štamparija, 1901.
- Miroslavljevo jevanđelje ( Évangéliaire ancien serbe du prince Miroslav), Preface (in Serbian and French) and notes (pp. 203–229) by Ljubomir Stojanović. - "Édition de sa majesté Alexandre I roi de Serbie" p. [iv], Fotografska reprodukcija i štampa c. i k. dvorskog umetničkog zavoda Angerera i Gešla, Vienna, 1897.
- Katalog Narodne biblioteke u Beogradu, Rukopisi i stare štampane knjige, edited by Ljomir Stojanović, Belgrade, Državna štamparija 1903.
- Republikanski pogledi na nekoliko savremenih pitanja, Ljub. Stojanović, Belgrade, Geca Kon Publishing House, 1920.
- Stari srpski rodoslovi i letopisi, par Ljubomir Stojanović, Sremski Karlovci, Srpska kraljevska akademija, 1927.
- Stari srpski zapisi i natpisi, vol. I- VI, edited and composed byLjubomir Stojanović, Srpska kraljevska akademija, Sremski Karlovci, Srpska manastirska štamparijia, 1926.
- Stare srpske povelje i pisma. Knjiga I, Dubrovnik i susedi njegovi. Drugi deo, edited and composed by Ljubomir Stojanović, Belgrade - Sremski Karlovci, Srpska manastirska štamparijia, 1934.
- Život i rad Vuka Stefanovića Karadžića (26. okt. 1787 - 26. jan. 1864), Belgrade, Geca Kon Publishing House, 1924, XXIV-783 p.
- Srpska gramatika za III razred gimnazije, Belgrade, Geca Kon Publishing House, 1921.

== Legacy ==
He is included in The 100 most prominent Serbs.

Government offices
Preceded by Nikola Pašić	Prime Minister of Serbia; 1905–1906	Succeeded by Sava Grujić
Preceded by Petar Velimirović	Prime Minister of Serbia; 1909	Succeeded by Nikola Pašić
Preceded by Živan Živanović	Minister of Education of Serbia; 1903	Succeeded by Dobrosav M. Ružić
Preceded by Dobrosav M. Ružić	Minister of Education of Serbia; 1903–1904	Succeeded by Ljubomir Davidović
Preceded by Stojan Protić	Minister of Internal Affairs; 1905	Succeeded by Ivan Pavićević
Preceded by Jovan Žujović	Minister of Education of Serbia; 1905–1906	Succeeded by Andra Nikolić
Preceded by Andra Nikolić	Minister of Education of Serbia; 1909	Succeeded by Jovan Žujović
