= Levač =

Geographical subregion of Šumadija, Serbia

Coordinates: 43.8678°N 21.0847°E

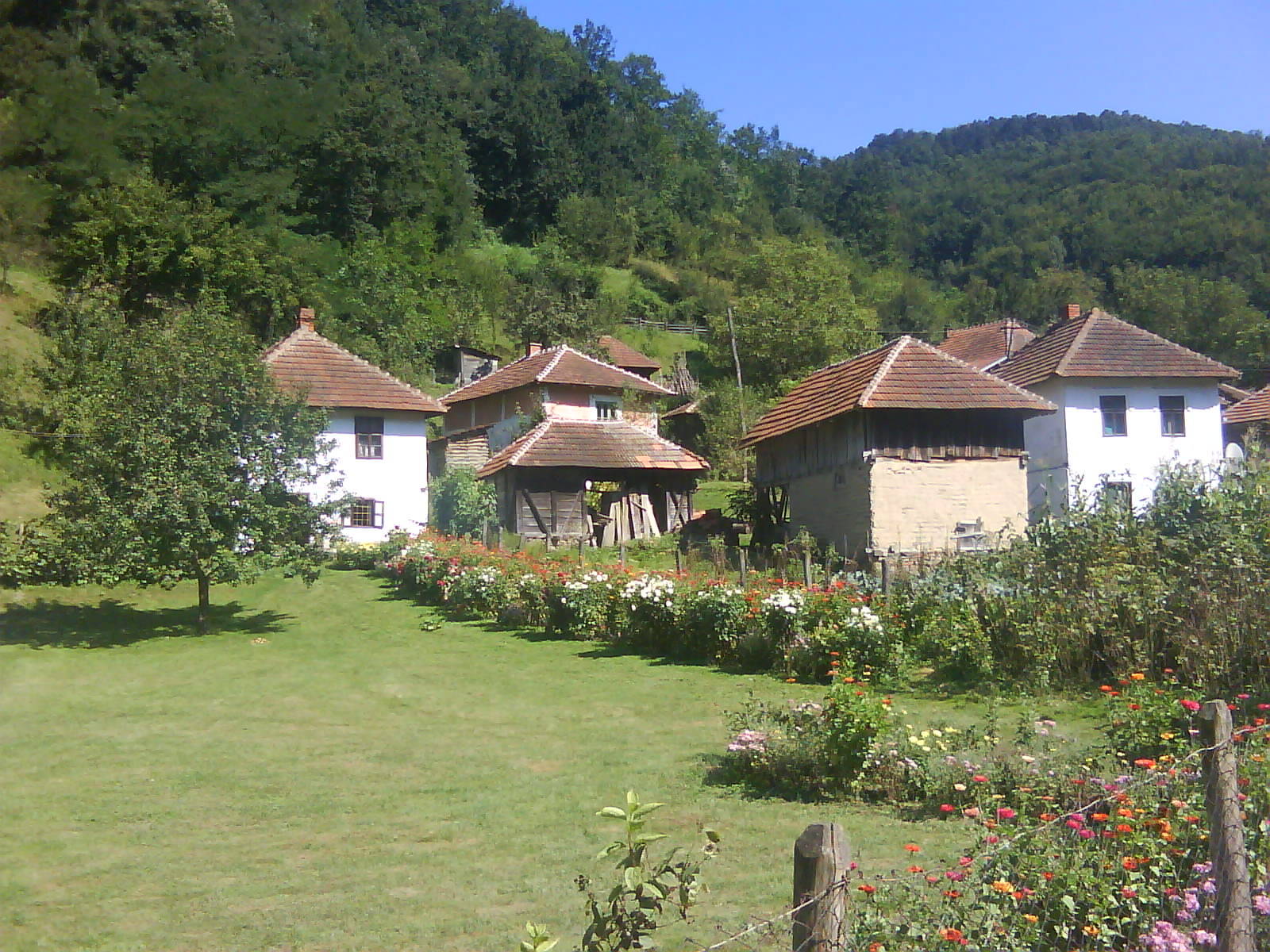
Old village architecture in Levač

Levač (Serbian Cyrillic: Левач) is a geographical and historical subregion of Šumadija in central Serbia. The most notable settlement is Rekovac.

== Geography ==
Levač is located between Juhor mountain on east and Gledić Mountains on west. It basically covers the territory of the Rekovac municipality.

== See also ==
- List of regions of Serbia

== Sources ==
- Јашовић, Голуб, et al. "Левач: тематски зборник." (2023): 1-412.
- Симоновић, Ђорђе. "Левач I–Територија и насеља од краја XII до почетка XX века." (1983).
- Бушетић, Тодор. "Левач." Београд: Српска краљевска академија (1903). Српски етнографски зборник, СКА, књ. 5, Насеља српских земаља, књ. 2
- Митровић, Адам. "Левач у Народноослободилачкој борби 1941-1945." (1985).
- Obradović, Mirjana. "Toponimija Levča." Универзитет у Крагујевцу (2024).
