= Rekovac =

Rekovac Рековац (Serbian)
- Village and municipality
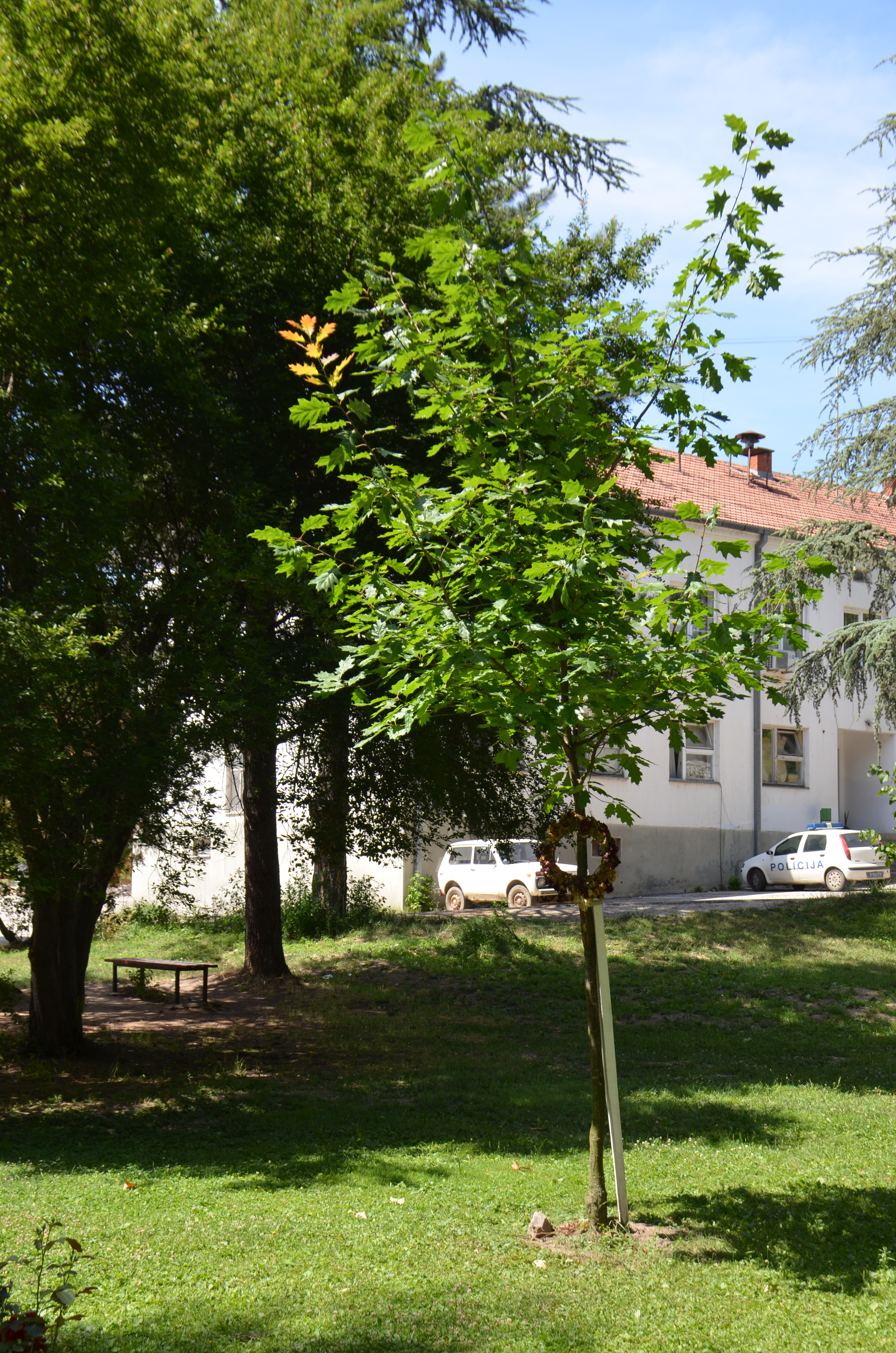

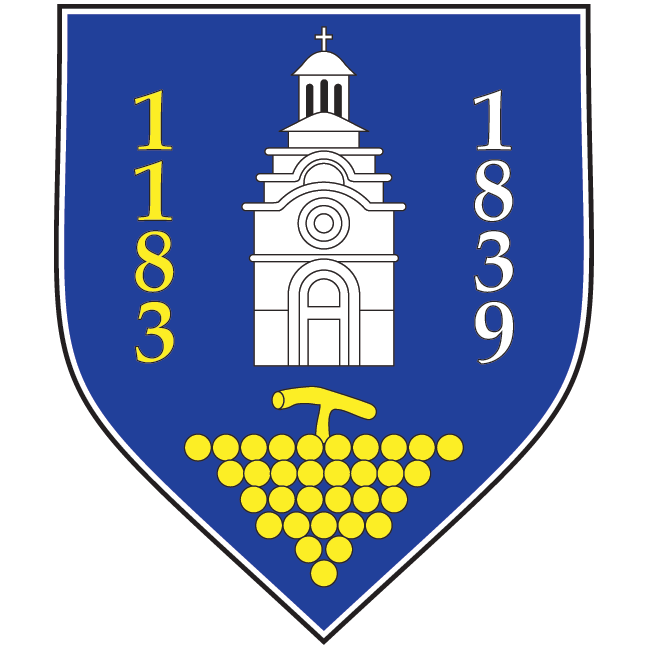
- Coat of arms

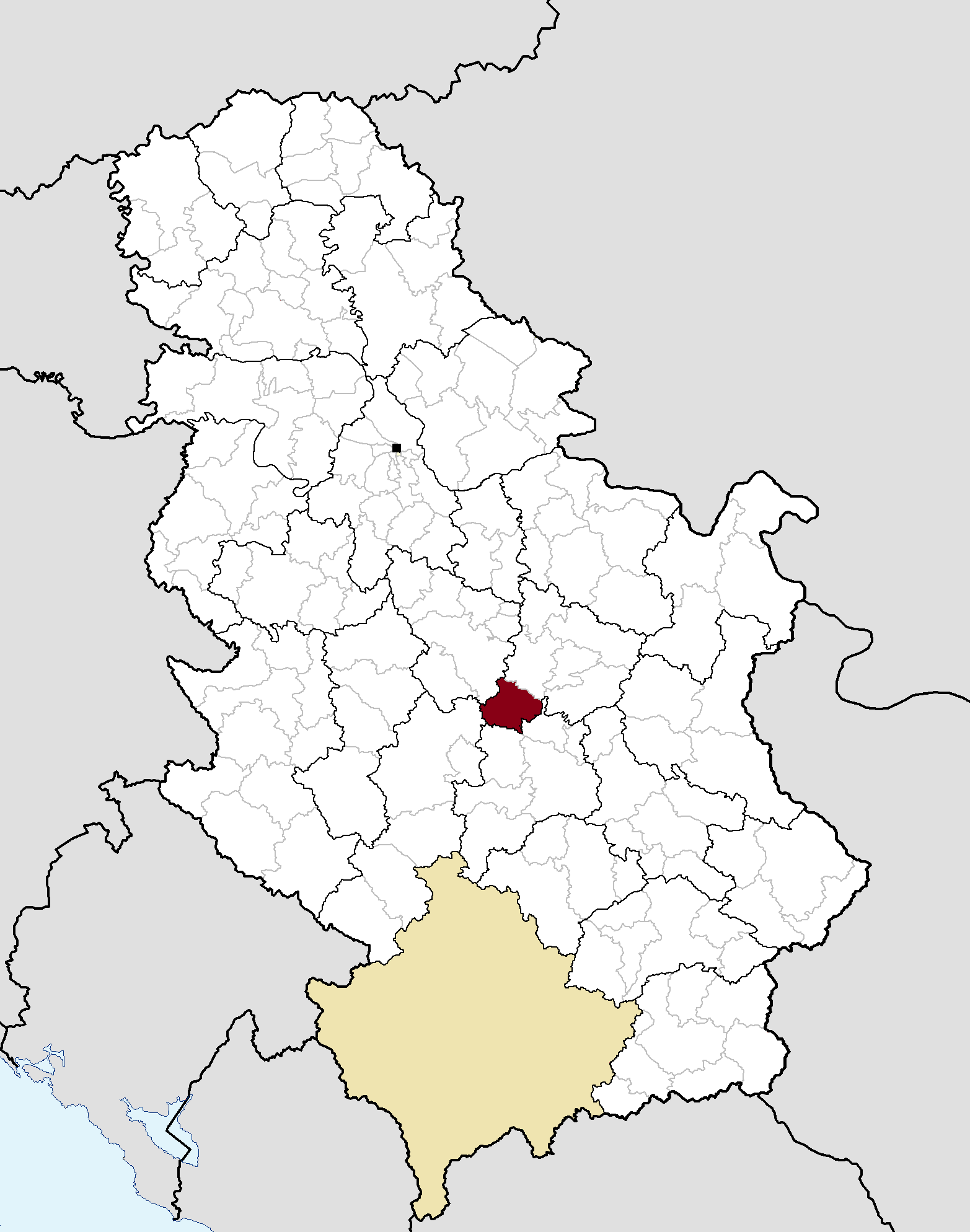
- Location of the municipality of Rekovac within Serbia
- Coordinates: 43°52′N 21°08′E
- Country: Serbia
- Region: Šumadija and Western Serbia
- District: Pomoravlje
- Settlements: 32

Government
  - Mayor: Dragiša Tomić (SNS)

Area
  - Municipality: 366 km^{2} (141 sq mi)
- Elevation: 241 m (791 ft)

Population (2022 census)
  - Town: 1,283
  - Municipality: 8,116
- Time zone: UTC+1 (CET)
  - Summer (DST): UTC+2 (CEST)
- Postal code: 35260
- Area code: +381(0)35
- Car plates: JA

Rekovac (Serbian Cyrillic: Рековац) is a small town and municipality located in the Pomoravlje District of central Serbia. According to 2022 census, the population of the town is 1,283, while population of the municipality is 8,116. Rekovac is the center of small geographical region called Levač.

The town has a river called Dulenka, named after one of the settlements in the municipality. There are two schools in Rekovac: a primary school called Svetozar Marković, and a highschool called Poljoprivredno-veterinarska škola.

== History ==
From 1929 to 1941, Rekovac was part of the Morava Banovina of the Kingdom of Yugoslavia.

== Demographics ==
Historical population
Year	Pop.	±% p.a.
1948	28,101	—
1953	28,085	−0.01%
1961	25,520	−1.19%
1971	22,710	−1.16%
1981	19,877	−1.32%
1991	17,011	−1.54%
2002	13,551	−2.05%
2011	11,055	−2.24%
2022	8,116	−2.77%

== Economy ==
The following table gives a preview of total number of employed people per their core activity (as of 2017):

Activity	Total
Agriculture, forestry and fishing	48
Mining	22
Processing industry	125
Distribution of power, gas and water	29
Distribution of water and water waste management	8
Construction	13
Wholesale and retail, repair	155
Traffic, storage and communication	102
Hotels and restaurants	50
Media and telecommunications	8
Finance and insurance	15
Property stock and charter	-
Professional, scientific, innovative and technical activities	22
Administrative and other services	28
Administration and social assurance	115
Education	215
Healthcare and social work	126
Art, leisure and recreation	14
Other services	24
Total	1,119
