= March 1893 Serbian parliamentary election =

- March 1893
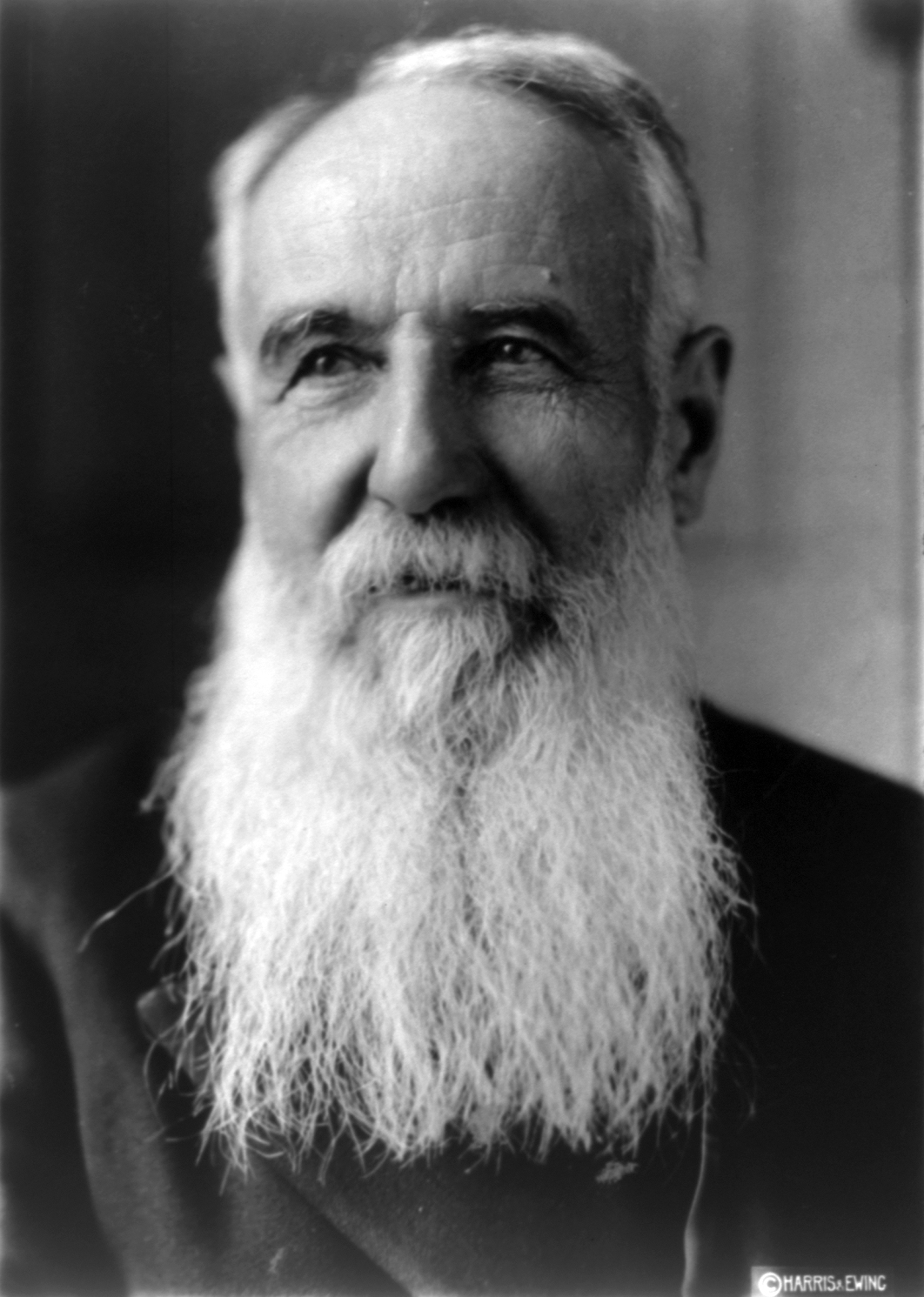

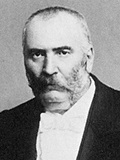

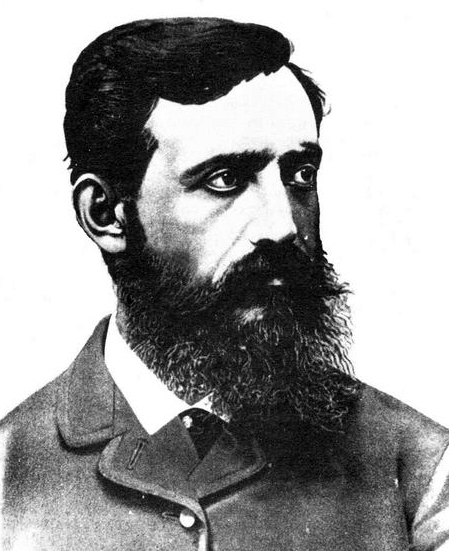
	First party	Second party	Third party
Leader	Nikola Pašić	Jovan Avakumović	Milutin Garašanin
Party	NRS	Liberal	Progressive
Seats won	64	64	4
Prime Minister before election
Jovan Avakumović
Liberal
Prime Minister after election
Lazar Dokić
NRS

Parliamentary elections were held in Serbia in early March 1893. Although the People's Radical Party had won a large majority in the 1889 elections, by 1893 a Liberal government led by Prime Minister Jovan Avakumović was in place.

The Liberals and People's Radical Party both won 64 seats, with the Progressive Party winning four. However, Liberals had manipulated the elections, which would have otherwise resulted in a majority for the People's Radical Party. As a result, the People's Radical Party threatened to boycott the Assembly, meaning the quorum of 68 members could not be achieved.

A coup d'état was carried out by King Alexander on 13 April, with the Liberal government of Jovan Avakumović removed from office and replaced by a cabinet headed by Lazar Dokić and composed of People's Radical Party members. The National Assembly was dissolved, and fresh elections called.

== Results ==
Graph of the party split among 132 seats.
Party	Seats	+/–
People's Radical Party	64	–46
Liberal Party	64	+49
Progressive Party	4	New
Total	132	+15
Source: The Times
