= 1890 Serbian parliamentary election =

Parliamentary elections were held in Serbia on 14 September 1890 to elect members of the National Assembly. The result was a landslide victory for the People's Radical Party.

== Background ==
The elections were the first held under the 1888 constitution. Following the introduction of the new constitution, an Electoral Act was passed in March 1890, which provided for nearly universal male suffrage and introduced the secret ballot.

== Results ==
The People's Radical Party won over 100 seats, while the Liberal Party won 14 and the Serbian Progressive Party just one (won by its leader Milutin Garašanin).

| Party | Votes | % | Seats |
|---|---|---|---|
| People's Radical Party | 152,935 | | >100 |
| Liberal Party | 23,548 | | 14 |
| Serbian Progressive Party | 8,895 | | 1 |
| Total | | | |
Source: Protić

== Aftermath ==
Nikola Pašić was appointed president of the National Assembly and Dimitrije Katić as vice president. When Pašić became Prime Minister in February 1891, Katić replaced him as president while Pavle Vuković became vice president.
