= 1887 Serbian parliamentary election =

Parliamentary elections were held in Serbia on 17 September 1887 to elect the 156 elected members of the National Assembly, with a further 52 appointed by the king.

== Background ==
Following the April 1886 elections a government was formed by Milutin Garašanin of the Serbian Progressive Party. However, it collapsed on 1 June 1887. It was replaced by a new government consisting of the People's Radical Party and Liberal Party and led by Liberal Jovan Ristić. The new government's first action was to dissolve the National Assembly. A decree on 13 August set the election date as 17 September.

== Results ==
The People's Radical Party won 81 seats and the Liberal Party 61, with the Progressives failing to win a seat. Not all seats were filled and supplementary elections were held later. The king appointed 36 Liberals and 16 Radicals to balance the result.

== Aftermath ==
Todor Tucaković was appointed president of the National Assembly and Paja Vuković as vice president.

The coalition government led by Ristić remained in office until December, when it was replaced by a Radicals-only government headed by Sava Grujić. A decree on 11 January 1888 dissolved the National Assembly and set early elections for March 1888.
