= 1895 Serbian parliamentary election =

- 7 April 1895
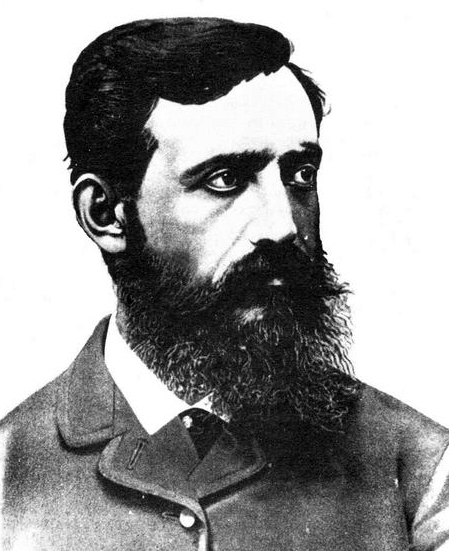

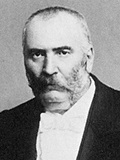

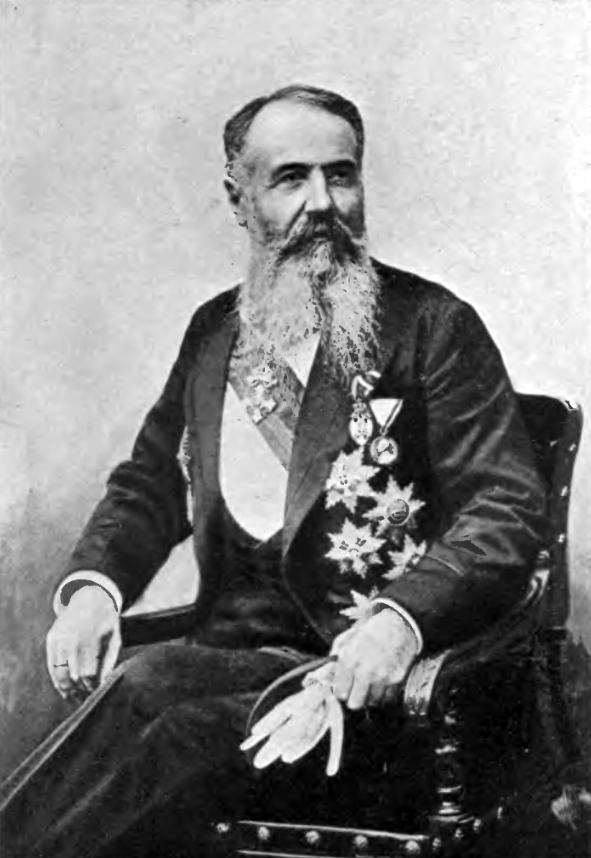
	First party	Second party	Third party
Leader	Milutin Garašanin	Jovan Avakumović	Nikola Pašić
Party	Progressive	Liberal	NRS
Seats won	208	30	2

Parliamentary elections were held in Serbia in April 1895. They followed a royal coup d'état by King Alexander in May 1894, in which he suspended the 1888 constitution and restored the 1869 constitution.

== Background ==
Whilst the 1888 constitution had increased the number of people eligible to vote, reverting to the 1869 constitution saw the government given the right to appoint one-third of the members of the National Assembly, whilst in many constituencies the Assembly members were elected indirectly through electoral colleges. The changes were expected to reduce the number of candidates of the People's Radical Party elected to the assembly.

== Results ==
The People's Radical Party boycotted the election, citing government interference.

The elections resulted in a victory for the Progressive Party government. Only six members of the People's Radical Party were elected, as well as 30 Liberals. Of the sixty appointed members, 49 were supporters of the government.
