= Jovan Djaja =

Serbian professor

Jovan Djaja (1846–1928) was a Serbian professor, journalist, translator and politician. He was one of the earliest leaders of the People's Radical Party.

== Biography ==
Jovan Djaja was born in a village in the vicinity of Dubrovnik. His Serbian parents were members of the Serb Catholic circle in the town. He was a Dubrovnik high school graduate who studied philosophy at the University of Vienna before settling in Belgrade. It was there that he first began to demonstrate an interest in politics, but did not join Radical Party until 1883 when they were on the verge of becoming prominent. An important moment in the transformation of the party's organization occurred during the Timocka buna of 1883, which was a setback not only for the party but put its survival at risk. The Timok Rebellion was a popular, peasant uprising, provoked by King Milan Obrenović's attempt to disarm the population as part of ongoing reform in the army. Milan ordered the entire executive board of the Radical Party arrested and imprisoned on the ground of instigating the revolt. The central leadership was made up of journalists, university professors, and merchants who were, obviously, not revolutionary types who freely talk about revolution, but are surely not about to start one. When arrested, Jovan Djaja entered prison wearing a top hat, Pera Todorović entered the prison gates with gloves and a walking stick; and professor Giga Geršić was found by the police in his favorite coffee-house, drinking his traditional coffee. After his arrest, Jovan Djaja somehow succeeded to escape to Bulgaria with three others, including Nikola Pašić. Later, he returned to Serbia once he was pardoned.

== Journalistic and literary pursuits ==
As a writer, he was very active contributing to the Party's press – Samouprava and Odjek – throughout the 1880s and 1890s. From 1896 to 1906, he was editor-in-chief and leading writer of the newspaper Narod (People). which was owned by Kosta Tausanovic. He authored two important works – Pictures of the Classical Age (1882) and The Union of Serbia and Bulgaria (1904).

In the mid-1890s, Jovan Djaja who stood on the right wing of the Radical Party's political spectrum along with Kosta Taušanović and as a result of their opposition to Nikola Pašić, they were both ousted for refusing the official party line. At the turn of the century, Djaja went on to serve in the Ministry of Education, Ministry of Foreign Affairs and the Ministry of the Interior. Even though the Serbian Orthodox Church was the state religion did not hamper the elections of candidates of other faiths such as Djaja, a Roman Catholic, and the Protestant, Ljubomir Klerić, who was Minister of Education and Economy. Djaja also headed diplomatic missions in Athens (Greece) and Sofia (Bulgaria).

== Works ==
After politics, Djaja spent the rest of his life devoting himself to literature, translating the work from Italian, French, and Latin authors. From Italian, he translated Alessandro Manzoni's "The Betrothed"; from French, Victor Hugo's Quartevingt-seize (Ninety-three); and from Latin, Tacitus's Annals.
