= May 1893 Serbian parliamentary election =

Parliamentary elections held in Serbia in 1893

- 31 May 1893
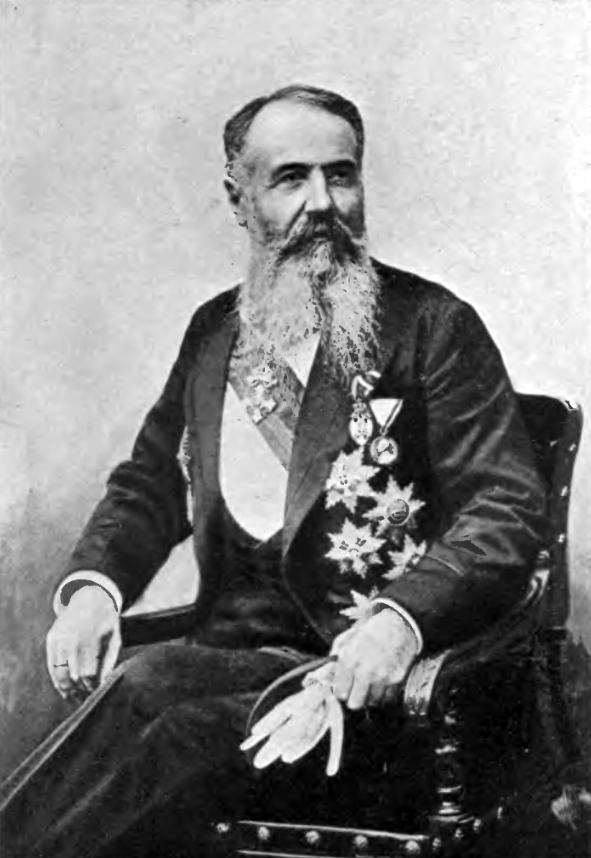

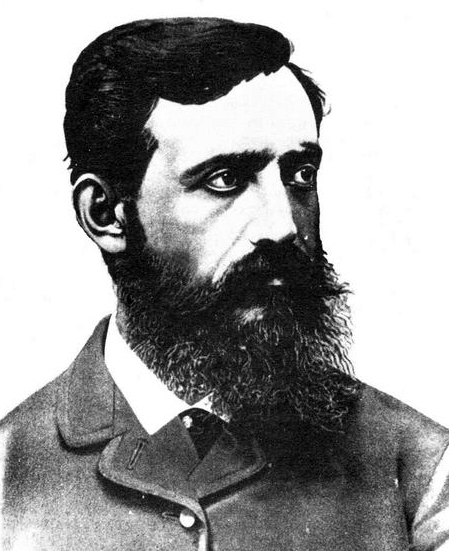
	First party	Second party
Leader	Nikola Pašić	Milutin Garašanin
Party	NRS	Progressive
Seats won	121	11
Prime Minister before election
Jovan Avakumović
Democratic Liberal
Prime Minister after election
Jovan Dokić
NRS

Parliamentary elections were held in Serbia on 31 May 1893. They were held following a coup d'état by King Alexander in April, which removed the Liberal government which had remained in power following the March 1893 elections. The People's Radical Party won a large majority.

== Results ==
Party	Seats	+/–
People's Radical Party	121	+57
Progressive Party	11	+7
Liberal Party	1	–63
Others	1	–
Total	134	+2
Source: The Times
