= 1884 Serbian parliamentary election =

← 1883	25 January 1884	1886 →
- 130 of the 174 seats in the National Assembly; 88 seats needed for a majority
Party	Leader	Seats	+/–
Conservative	Nikola Hristić	58	New
Progressive	Milan Piroćanac	55	+31
NRS	Nikola Pašić	14	−58
Liberal	Jovan Ristić	3	−27
Royal appointees	–	44	0
This lists parties that won seats. See the complete results below.
Prime Minister before	Prime Minister after
Nikola Hristić; Conservative	Milutin Garašanin; Progressive

Parliamentary elections were held in Serbia on 25 January 1884 to elect members of the National Assembly. The governing Conservative Party won 58 of the 130 seats. King Milan appointed a further 44 members. Following the elections, Milutin Garašanin of the Progressive Party became prime minister.

== Results ==
Party	Seats
Conservative Party	58
Progressive Party	55
People's Radical Party	14
Liberal Party	3
Appointed by the King	44
Total	174
Source: The Times
