= 1897 Serbian parliamentary election =

Parliamentary elections were held in Serbia on 22 June 1897 to elect members of the National Assembly.

== Results ==
A total of 191 members were elected, with a further 63 appointed. The elections were boycotted by the Liberal Party, while the Serbian Progressive Party had dissolved itself prior to the elections. As a result, the People's Radical Party won all the seats. However, several members of the Liberals and Progressives were named amongst the appointees to the National Assembly.

== Aftermath ==
Nikola Pašić was appointed president of the National Assembly and Dimitrije Katić as vice president.

The Radical Party's Đorđe Simić remained Prime Minister, but was dismissed by the king in October 1897 and replaced by Vladan Đorđević, who headed a cabinet whose members (with the exception of the Minister of War) were appointed by the king, largely composed of independents and Progressives, with a single Liberal. On 14 March 1898 the Assembly was dissolved, with the intention of holding new elections. A decree was issued on 18 April setting the election date as 23 May.
