= 1883 Serbian parliamentary election =

Parliamentary elections were held in Serbia on 7 September 1883 to elect the elected members of the National Assembly. The result was a victory for the opposition People's Radical Party and Liberal Party, which together won 102 seats. The government led by Milan Piroćanac resigned, but King Milan I refused to allow the Radicals to form a government, instead appointing Nikola Hristić as prime minister.

== Background ==
The National Assembly elected in 1880 was dissolved on 11 January 1883. A royal decree set elections for 7 September.

== Results ==
The People's Radical Party won 72 seats and the Liberal Party 30, with the Progressives winning only 24. The king appointed a further 44 members. Due to unrest, elections were not held in eight districts.

Party	Seats
People's Radical Party	72
Liberal Party	30
Serbian Progressive Party	24
Appointed members	44
Total	170
Source: Mitrinović & Brasić

== Aftermath ==
The new Assembly convened on 15 September and was formally opened on 22 September. Sima Nestorović was appointed president of the National Assembly and Arsa Drenovac as vice president.

However, the Timok Rebellion broke out around a month later. Most of the Radical Party's committee were jailed, although its leader Nikola Pašić managed to flee abroad. The National Assembly was reconvened on 30 December, but dissolved on the same day, with early elections called for January 1884.
