= Andrija Radenić =

Serbian historian and writer

- Born: 4 April 1913; Boka (Sečanj), Austria-Hungary
- Died: 7 February 2012; Belgrade, Serbia
- Occupations: Historian and writer.
- Writing career
- Period: 1955-2006
- Subjects: History of Serbia and Vojvodina 1848-1918

Andrija Radenić (Serbian: Андрија Раденић; née Andrija Steigenberg; 1913–2012) was a Serbian historian and writer.

== Early life and education ==
Andrija Steigenberg was born on April 4, 1913, in a poor Jewish family in the village of Boka in Banat (at that time in Austria-Hungary), as the son of a poor merchant Alexander Steigenberg and Jelisaveta Miller. He finished high school in Petrovgrad (today's Zrenjanin) in 1932, and the Faculty of Philosophy in Zagreb in 1939. He studied history, German and French language.

== Career ==
After completing his studies, he taught history at a private high school in Zagreb. The April war in 1941. found him serving his military service in Sarajevo. He was captured after fighting with the Ustaše in Mostar, and spent the war in German captivity, as a translator in a hospital for prisoners of war. He was liberated by the units of the Red Army at the end of April 1945. His parents, two younger brothers and a sister were killed in 1941 in a German concentration camp. He was admitted to the Communist Party of Yugoslavia in 1947ː on the form for admission to the party, he declared himself a Serb. During the 50s, after the first published works, he changed his surname to Radenić.

After the war, he worked as an official in the Federal Ministry of Education and the Federal Committee for Science and Culture (1945–1946), as a history teacher in a high school (1947), as an official in the Federation of Trade Unions of Yugoslavia (1948), and in 1949 in the presidency of Serbian Academy of Sciences and Arts. After 1950, he worked at the Institute of History in Belgrade. He obtained the doctorate of historical sciences in 1956 with the dissertation "The position and struggle of the peasantry in Srem from the end of the 19th century to 1914". At the Institute of History, he dedicated his work to the history of Serbia and Vojvodina from 1848 to 1918, and he wrote and published a number of books and scientific papers on that matter between 1955 and 2006. In the period from 1992 to 1997, he published several works on the history of Jews in Serbia.

== Death ==
He died in Belgrade in 2012, age 98.

== Selected works ==
- Persecution of political opponents in the regime of Aleksandar Obrenović 1893-1903 (Serbian: Прогони политичких противника у режиму Александра Обреновића 1893-1903), printed in 1973 in Belgrade.
- The Radical Party and the Timok Rebellion (Serbian: Радикална странка и тимочка буна), printed in 1988 in Zaječar. A book about the early history of the Serbian People's Radical Party (1881–1883) and Timok Rebellion (1883) of the Serbian peasants against king Milan Obrenović.
- Serbia's foreign policy in controversial historiography: from Načertanije in 1844 to the creation of Yugoslavia in 1914-1918 (Serbian: Спољна политика Србије у контроверзној историографији : од Начертанија 1844. до стварања Југославије 1914-1918.), printed in 2006 in Belgrade.
