= November 1888 Serbian parliamentary election =

Parliamentary elections were held in Serbia in November 1888, electing a Great National Assembly that would draft a new constitution. The result was a victory for the People's Radical Party.

== Electoral system ==
The Parliament 628 members; 88 directly elected in 23 boroughs and 540 indirectly elected to represent rural constituencies. In rural areas voters would first elect electors, who would in turn elect the MPs. Around 32,000 people were registered to vote.

== Campaign ==
The People's Radical Party were largely funded by Russian backing. Many of their candidates claimed that Serbia did not need an army, but should instead rely on militia.

== Conduct ==
On 28 November King Milan annulled the elections held in rural seats on the basis that the elections had not been free. The People's Radical Party had complained of interference by the police, whilst the Progressive Party had complained that the Radicals had conducted a violent campaign. The King ordered voting to restart on 3 December with three royal commissioners to attend each constituency.

== Results ==
The People's Radical Party were expected to have a majority of around 40 following the original elections, but after the rural constituencies voted for a second time, the majority was increased to nearly 200. The Progressive Party won several seats in the original elections, but were almost wiped out in the second vote.

| Party | Seats |
|---|---|
| People's Radical Party | 450 |
| Liberal Party | 150 |
| Progressive Party | 2 |
| Others | 26 |
| Total | 628 |
Source: The Times
