= 1888 Constitution of Serbia =

Constitution of Serbia

Constitution of the Kingdom of Serbia
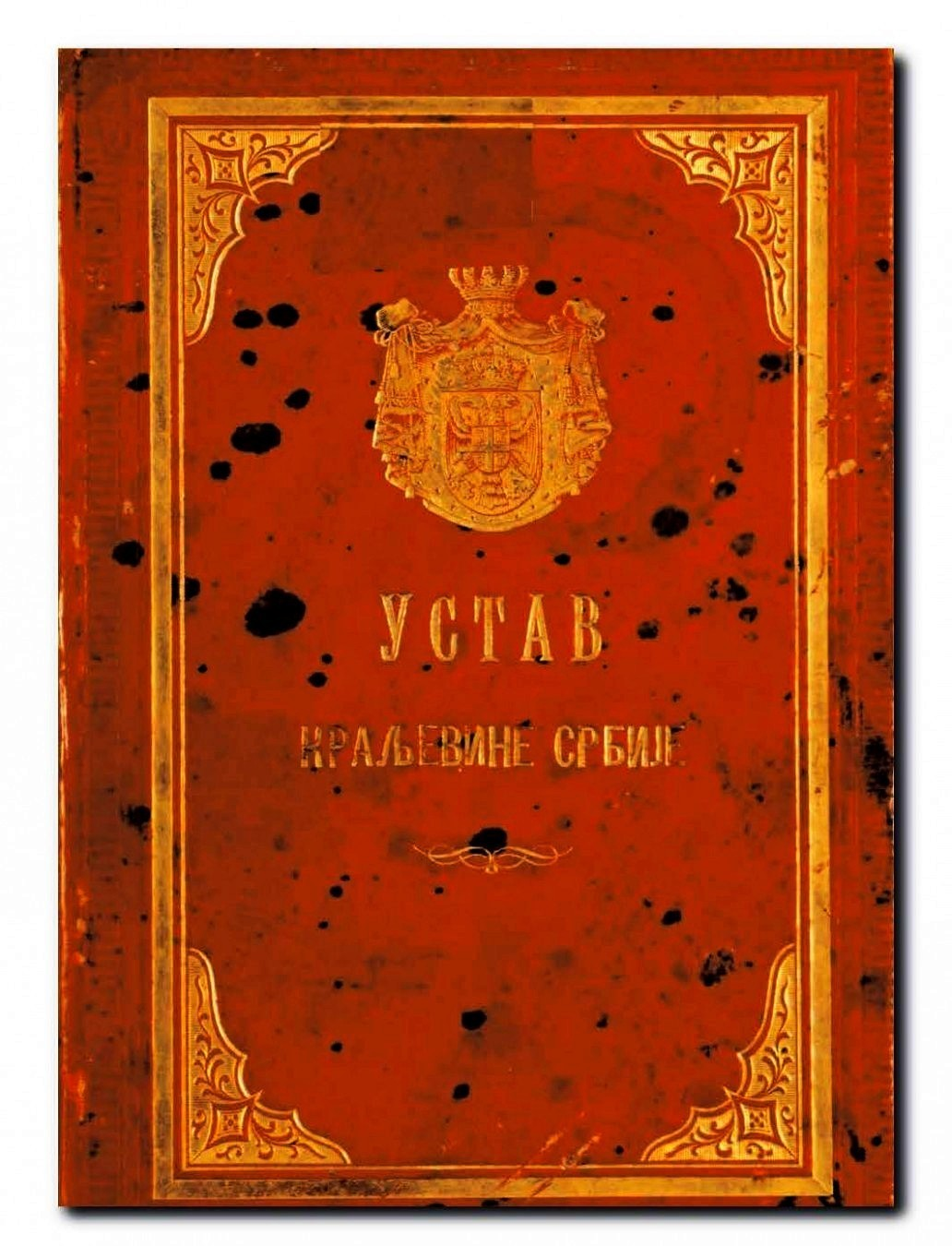
- Front page of the Serbian Constitution of 1888

Overview
- Jurisdiction: Kingdom of Serbia
- Presented: December 2, 1888
- Ratified: December 21, 1888 (January 2, 1889, according to the Julian calendar)
- System: Civil, constitutional, parliamentary monarchy
- Repealed: May 9, 1894 (King Alexander carried out the second coup d'état, and reinstated the Constitution from 1869)

The Constitution of the Kingdom of Serbia from 1888 (also known as the Radical Constitution) was the fourth constitution of Serbia that was in use from 1889 to 1894. It was adopted by the Great National Assembly, at its session on January 2, 1889 (December 21, 1888 according to the Gregorian calendar). In the Timok Rebellion of 1883, the conflict between the democratic aspirations of the masses and the absolutist aspirations of King Milan reached its climax. Numerous external and internal problems that called into question the future of the Obrenović dynasty on the throne forced the king to adopt that constitution.

The Constitution of 1888 elaborated the basic progressive ideas of the European constitutionalism of the time - the people's representative is an equal participant in legislature with the monarch; the parliament gets full budget rights, as well as the right to ask questions, interpellation in electoral and purely administrative matters¸ the Government is politically accountable to the parliament; elections are direct, and the parliamentary mandate is assigned according to the principle of proportional representation; civil rights are precisely regulated by the Constitution and are directly guaranteed by the Constitution; the judicial branch is independent; municipal, county and district self-government was introduced. At the same time, the broad masses of peasants were especially satisfied with the self-government of the districts, counties, and municipalities, which supported the radicals because the peasants were more bitter about centralism and the state police than they were enthusiastic about parliamentarism, which was still a new thing for them. The shadow on these democratic institutions is cast by the institution of qualified MPs, namely, two persons with special qualifications who are directly elected as MPs in each district. Those persons, in addition to the general conditions required for the election of MPs, also had to possess a university degree or a qualification specified in the Constitution. That was the price the radicals had to pay for opposing the progressives' proposal to introduce a second chamber into the National Assembly, the purpose of which was to limit the power of the majority. The right to vote was not universal; there was an obligatory tax census and other legal and constitutional restrictions.

== Background ==
In the late 1870s and early 1880s, three political parties were formed in Serbia: the People's Radical Party, the Liberal Party and the Serbian Progressive Party.

In Serbia, the formation of political parties began after the wars. Under the influence of the socialist ideas of Svetozar Marković, the radical party was formed, and conservative elements, which strived for reforms in Serbia in the spirit of the age, formed, together with some liberal dissidents, the progressive party.

After the adoption of the 1869 constitution, the Liberal Party, which was the only one that could create a serious opposition, became the ruling party. Newly created parties—progressives and radicals—dissatisfied with the existing situation put the reform of the constitution at the forefront of their political program.

In their proposal for a new constitution, the progressives advocated, among other things, giving the Parliament the power it has in countries with a parliamentary regime but with two chambers, both based on high censuses.

The radical party, whose origin was the socialist movement of Svetozar Marković, criticized the bureaucratic system from an economic point of view in the 1870s. But in the early 1880s, when they formally organized themselves as a political party, the radicals focused their attention on the relationship between the Government and the Assembly, seeking a new constitution that would give the Assembly supreme power.

On October 19, 1880, the Liberal Party of Jovan Ristić stepped down from power, and its place was taken by the Progressive Party, with whose support Prince Milan signed the so-called Secret Convention with Austria. According to it, Austria guarantees Prince Milan and his descendants the throne of Serbia, as well as diplomatic support in the event of Serbia's southward expansion. In return, Prince Milan promises that Serbia will not conduct any agitation in Bosnia and Herzegovina (already under Austrian occupation at that point) and that, without a prior agreement with Austria-Hungary, it will not conclude political agreements with other countries.

The People's Radical Party grew stronger and had the support of the vast majority of the peasant population, which made up nearly 90% of the country's population. The Liberal and Progressive parties had the support of merchants, rural householders, bankers, and industrialists. As early as 1882, there was a conflict between the People's Radical Party and the ruling Progressive Party and a serious parliamentary crisis. The collapse of the joint-stock company, Bontu's "General Union", which at the time of bankruptcy owed Serbia more than 34 million dinars (Serbia's budget at the time did not amount to more than 26 million) dealt a heavy blow to the progressive government and contributed to the growth in popularity of the radical opposition. It was the only topic for months. The government was considering resigning, but Prince Milan was against it. The government needed a victory to overshadow Bontu's bankruptcy, and because of this, the ministers requested that Serbia be proclaimed a kingdom. Prince Milan agreed, and the kingdom was proclaimed on February 22, 1882. This led to a short-lived jubilance among the people, but after a few days, the opposition set an ultimatum to the government to respond to the interpellation about Bontu's demise within 24 hours. When the government refused, the opposition (radicals and liberals) left the assembly and thus left it without a quorum (which was then 3/4 of the total number of MPs). Attempts to fill the vacant seats in by-elections failed, as radical MPs were twice re-elected to the assembly. However, after the second election, the progressive government annulled all the votes received by the excluded MPs, and those who received the most votes behind them entered the assembly. Some of the MPs who entered the assembly based on this principle did not receive more than two votes, which is why they earned the name "two-votes", and the whole assembly "two-votes parliament".

The popularity that the radicals gained among the people was the reason for harsh attacks and persecution by the ruling Progressive Party and King Milan, who used all legal and illegal means against the radicals. In the atmosphere of intensified fights among the parties and the king's profound intolerance towards the radicals, in the fall of 1883, the Timok Rebellion broke out in eastern Serbia, which Milan used to deal with the Radical Party and its most prominent leaders.

Encouraged by the new situation and freed from the trepidations of the radicals, the king makes another risky international move. In November 1885, with the justification that he was protecting the balance of power in the Balkans, he declared war on Bulgaria, which shortly before that, in September of the same year, annexed Eastern Rumelia, an autonomous province of the Ottoman Empire, with a Christian general governor. Insufficiently armed, unprepared, and exhausted in the previous wars (1876–78), the Serbian army suffered defeat at Slivnica and then at Pirot. With the Treaty of Bucharest and the mediation of Austria, the territorial status quo was established. Defeat in the war with Bulgaria made the position of King Milan difficult, and he thought about abdication. The opposition, which had calmed down after the Timok Rebellion, had raised its voice again. To re-establish the authority of his dynasty, which was undermined by the unpopular war with Bulgaria, Milan needed the support of the Radical Party. For these reasons, a coalition government of liberals and radicals was formed (in June 1887) in place of the previous progressive one, and from September, it was purely radical.

With the proclamation of October 14, 1888, King Milan ordered elections for the Great National Assembly in order to change the constitution. The king also made it known that the new constitution must be a joint work of all parties and that he will approve only that on what all parties agree on. The new constitution was confirmed and published on December 22, 1888.

The Constitutional Committee, which was appointed on October 15, was tasked with preparing the draft of the new constitution. The king kept the position of chairman of the committee for himself, while Jovan Ristić, Milutin Garašanin and Sava Grujić were appointed as vice-chairmen of the board. From the ranks of this committee, which numbered over 80 people, a Short Committee of 12 members was elected, which worked from October 22 to November 24. The new Constitution, which was adopted and published on December 22, 1888, was based mainly on the draft given by the Short Committee.

== The Peoples Radical Party ==
The Radical Party was the first to organize. In its statutes, which were created in 1881, the most important thing is that, in addition to one main board that sat in Belgrade, there are also local boards throughout the country. Until then, no party had one of these local committees; however, only with the help of such committees could the party enter into closer ties with the people and draw them into its organization.

Since the statutes of the radical party were finished, its agitators dispersed throughout the country to interpret the party's program and to give the first instructions for the formation of local committees. Only after the ground had been prepared in this way did they start enrolling peasants in the radical party. At first, the enrollment process was not easy. It was a new thing for the peasant. During the police state of the Defender of the Constitution and Prince Mihailo, the peasants were told that it was not their place to lead politics and criticize the actions of the government. It is his duty to listen to and respect the government.

When the radicals started calling the peasants to join their party, the peasants were afraid that the police wouldn't take them into questioning, and that they wouldn't end up in prison because they wanted to engage in politics publicly.

Radicals were the first to carry out party recruitment of peasants en masse, first to go with party lists from place to place, and first to establish local committees as a kind of party enforcer, which would keep the peasant mass under constant supervision and leadership.

Among the people, Pera Todorović has the most credit for the creation of a radical party. One of the dearest students of Svetozar Marković and the main collaborator of his political newspaper "Тhe Public", Todorović, much more than Pašić, was considered Marković's successor and the guardian of his doctrine.

Todorović did not imagine the radical party as an ordinary party. For him, as for the Russian revolutionaries, politics was a matter of faith.

In his memoirs, Todorović writes that radicalism showed all the signs of religious fanaticism, and that it did not take long for it to become a "powerful religious sect", which would cross the borders of our country and spread throughout the Balkans.

=== Clashes of King Milan and the Radicals ===
In the battle between the progressives and the radicals, the progressives had the king on their side, and the radicals had the people. The king "progressed" and the peasant "radicalized". The struggle between the progressives and the radicals turned into a struggle between the king and the people. The radicals sought the government for themselves as the party with the majority of the people's support. Since they have the trust of the people, the king should also give it to them. King Milan was of the opinion that the party seeking government must, in addition to the majority of the people, also have the ability to manage state affairs.

The conflict between King Milan and the Progressive Party, on the one hand, and the People's Radical Party, on the other, was getting more and more intense. King Milan intended to use Ilka's assassination in 1883 to deal with the radicals, but the investigation did not establish their involvement, and Jelena-Ilka Marković remained silent and did not accuse anyone of helping her. In the same year, shortly after the victory of the radicals in the elections of September 7, 1883, the Timok Rebellion broke out, which the king used to deal with the radicals.

Many radicals were sentenced to long prison sentences, including some members of the main board of the party. Several were sentenced to death, but none were executed. Nikola Pašić emigrated to Bulgaria and thus avoided the execution of his death sentence, while the other death row inmates from among the radicals were pardoned. Slobodanka Stojičić states that the Timok Rebellion was the main turning point in the events surrounding the constitutional reform. According to her, the Radical Party, after the Timok Rebellion and the king's confrontation with it, was no longer exclusive and was prepared to negotiate and compromise with the court (especially the Belgrade leadership of the party).

== Adoption of the Constitution ==
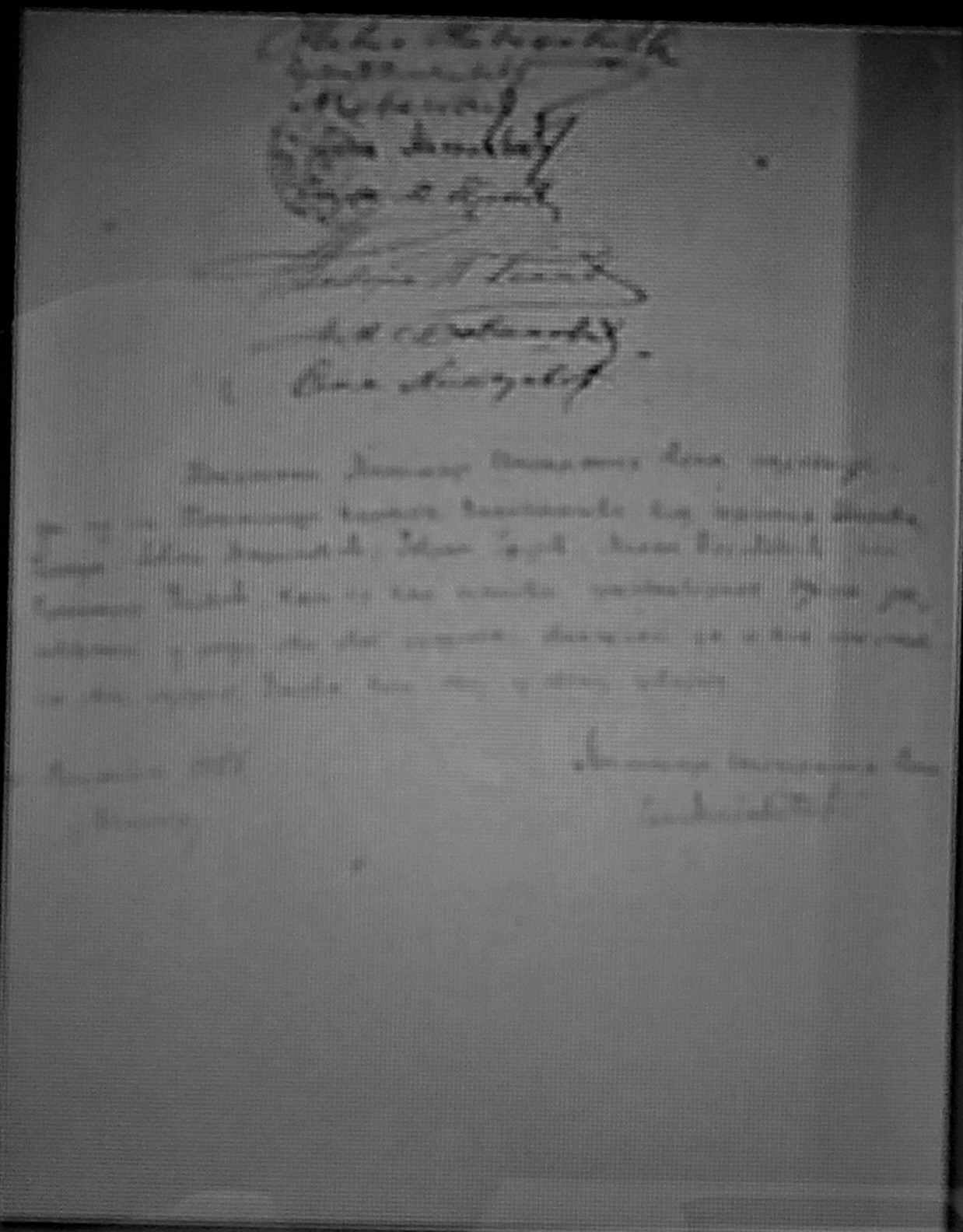
Signatures on the draft of the Constitution 1888

As an independent kingdom, Serbia formally adopted three constitutions in 1888, 1901, and 1903. Given that the 1903 constitution was essentially a reinstated constitution of 1888, there were actually two constitutional texts in total.

That constitution was adopted by the Great National Assembly in December 1888. The constitution was voted on by the Great National Assembly on December 21, 1888, and the king ratified it on December 22, at a ceremonial session.

Work on the preparation of the new constitution began in October 1888. Then King Milan established a constitutional committee of about 80 members, which included representatives of the three parties at the time (progressive, liberal and radical) and experts. Based on his understanding that the constitution is a "bilateral contract between the king and the people", King Milan demanded that the text adopted by the constitutional committee must be adopted by the Grand National Assembly as well, without any changes, or reject it in total.

=== Method of adoption and reform ===
King Milan presented the constitution as a "bilateral contract between the Crown and the people", from which its characteristic as a constitutional pact clearly emerged. It was adopted by the Great National Assembly "from cover to cover"—without the possibility to intervene in the proposed text, which is why it did not even discuss the proposal for a whole day. The adopted text was ratified and proclaimed by King Milan.

The constitution provided a procedure for amending and supplementing the constitutional text, according to a very complicated procedure. The Radical Constitution was amended in a similar way as the Regency Constitution—through the constitutional pact system. A proposal to amend, supplement, or interpret something in the Constitution could be made by the king or the National Assembly. In such a proposal, all points of the Constitution that would have to be reformed, supplemented, or interpreted had to be named. First, the proposed reforms had to be adopted by the regular National Assemblies resulting from two consecutive elections, and then the Grand National Assembly (twice as many as the regular one) would be convened. If it also adopted the proposed reforms, the king would finally have to approve them. It is interesting that the Constitution of 1888 did not regulate the possibility of adopting a completely new constitution but only; its amendments were mentioned. The institution of the Great National Assembly, which was introduced by Prince Mihailo in 1861, was criticized in theory as an unnecessary constitutional factor. One of the key arguments against such an institution was that it has no significant comparative application because, apart from Serbia, it was recognized in Europe only by Bulgaria and Greece and in the Americas only by Paraguay and El Salvador. It was also considered that, due to the excessive number of members, the Great National Assembly was incapable of constitutional work.

== Contents of the Constitution ==
=== State polity ===
The key value of the Constitution of 1888 is that it enabled the parliamentary system of government, the essence of which is that ministers are not appointed to that position and do not remain in it at the will of the monarch but at the will of the parliamentary majority. In other words, this constitution enabled the transition from a constitutional to a parliamentary monarchy. The Constitution did not set as a condition that only MPs can be elected as ministers ("Westminster" model of the parliamentary system), but it did not foresee the incompatibility of those two attributes either, i.e., that the MP elected as a minister loses his parliamentary mandate.

With the adoption of the Constitution of 1888, the Kingdom of Serbia joined the ranks of European states with a liberal democratic constitutionalism. This constitution introduced a parliamentary system (albeit in its worst form, the dual or Orleans variant), with a well-balanced division of powers and an independent judicial branch. The National Assembly finally became a true legislative authority, and a proportional system of mandate distribution and free political mandates were introduced as well.

=== Form of government, state religion and state territory ===
The Kingdom of Serbia is a hereditary constitutional monarchy with a People's Representative body. The coat of arms of the Kingdom of Serbia is a double-headed white eagle on a red shield with a royal crown. The national colors are red, blue, and white.

The state religion in Serbia is Eastern Orthodox Christianity. The Serbian Church is autocephalous. It does not depend on any foreign church but maintains unity in dogmas with the Eastern Universal Church.

The state territory of the Kingdom of Serbia could neither be alienated nor separated. It could neither be reduced nor exchanged without the consent of the Great National Assembly. But in cases of correction of uninhabited borders of minor importance, the consent of the ordinary National Assembly was also sufficient. The Kingdom of Serbia was divided into 15 districts. Districts were divided into regions, and regions into municipalities.

=== Organization of government ===
Constitutional provisions indirectly introduced the principle of separation of powers. The central political institutions under the Constitution of 1888 were the National Assembly, the King, and the Government (Council of Ministers). Legislative power was exercised jointly by the king and the National Assembly.

The right to propose laws belonged to both members of the legislative authority. Each law required the consent of both members of the legislature. The law has no retroactive effect to the detriment of rights acquired by earlier laws (prohibition of retroactivity).

Executive authority was carried out by the king through ministers.

The judicial branch was independent; court rulings and verdicts were pronounced and executed in the name of the king and based on the law.

The State Council is retained in the system of the highest state bodies.

==== The King ====
The king is defined as the "head of state" who "has all the rights of state authority". He had the prerogatives that a monarch has in a constitutional parliamentary monarchy; he was the holder of executive powers, but he also had an effective role in the exercise of legislative power (the right of legislative initiative) and the role of the holder of state authority. The king approved and proclaimed laws. No law could be considered valid until the king proclaimed it. The monarch had the right to convene, adjourn, and dissolve the National Assembly, with the condition that the act of dissolution must contain an order for new elections within two months at the latest. The king appointed and dismissed ministers, who were accountable for their work both to him and to the National Assembly. He appointed all the judges in the country and half of the State Council members.

The king's person was inviolable. The king could not be held accountable for anything, nor could he be sued. The king and his Court had to be of the Eastern Orthodox faith. The king was the protector of all recognized religions in Serbia. The heir to the throne and other members of the royal family could not marry without the king's permission. The king appointed all civil servants. All authorities in the country exercised their authority in his name and under his supreme supervision. The king was the supreme commander of all state power; he awarded military ranks, decorations, and other awards established by law. The king had the right to coin money according to the law. The king had the right of amnesty and also had the right of pardon for criminal offenses. He could convert the punishment adjudicated against the guilty party into a punishment of a second, lesser degree, reduce it, or completely forgive the culprit.

The king represented the country in all relations with countries abroad. He declared war, signed treaties of peace, alliances, and others, and imparted them to the National Assembly if and when the interests and security of the country allowed it.

But commercial contracts and executed agreements that required payment from the state treasury, changes in state laws, or limited the public or private rights of Serbian citizens were valid only after they were approved by the National Assembly.

The king lived in the country permanently. If it was necessary for the king to leave the country for an extended period of time, he was legally represented in the exercise of constitutional royal authority by the heir to the throne if he was of legal age. If the heir to the throne was not of age or if he was prevented from representing the king, the royal constitutional authority would be exercised by the Council of Ministers according to the instructions given to them by the king within the limits of the Constitution.

The king convened the National Assembly in regular or extraordinary sessions. He opened and closed the sessions of the National Assembly personally, either with a speech from the throne or, through the Ministerial Council, with an epistle or a decree. The throne speech, the epistle, and the decree were countersigned by all ministers. He had the right to adjourn the sessions of the National Assembly, but that adjournment could not be longer than two months, nor could it be repeated in the same session without the consent of the National Assembly. He had the right to dissolve the National Assembly, but the act of dissolution had to contain an order for new elections to be called within the next two months at the latest and an order to reconvene the National Assembly no later than three months from the date of dissolution. The decree of dissolution of the Assembly was countersigned by all the ministers.

The king could not be the head of another state simultaneously without the consent of the Great National Assembly.

No royal act that was related to state affairs had legal authority and could not be executed if it was not countersigned by the competent minister, who was therefore accountable for it.

The king and the heir to the throne are considered adults when they reach the age of eighteen. In the event of the king's death, the heir to the throne, if he is of age, would immediately begin his rule and receive the crown as a constitutional king. The king announced his accession to the throne to the people with a proclamation. He would then convene the National Assembly within ten days after the announcement of the passing of the deceased king in order to take the oath prescribed by the Constitution before it. If the National Assembly was previously dissolved and a new one has not yet been elected, the old National Assembly would be convened to perform this task. These constitutional provisions were also valid in cases when the king handed over the throne to his heir.

In accepting the royal authority, the king took the oath before the National Assembly, which read as follows:

I (name), by ascending the throne of the Kingdom of Serbia and accepting the royal authority, swear by Almighty God and everything that is most sacred and dear to me in this world that I will protect the independence of Serbia and all its territories, that I will keep the state Constitution intact, that I will rule according to it and the laws, and that in all my aspirations and actions I will have the good of the people before my eyes. By solemnly swearing this oath of mine before God and the people, I call as a witness the Lord God, to whom I will answer at his terrible judgment. So the Lord God helped me! Amen!

In the event of the king's death, if the heir to the throne was not of legal age, the royal constitutional authority would be exercised by the regents, composed of three persons, until he came of age. The regents were elected by the National Assembly, specially convened for that purpose, from among the six persons that the deceased king had designated as regency candidates in his testament. That testament had to be written and signed by the king himself. It was not countersigned by the ministers. All the members of the Council of Ministers signed the back of the testament as witnesses. The testament was written in three copies, each of which was marked by the royal seal. One of them was handed over to the State Council, another to the Court of Cassation, and the third to the keeper of the state seal. If the king did not designate candidates for regents in his will, the Great National Assembly was convened to elect the regents. The Great National Assembly was then convened no later than a month after the passing of the king.

Regents could only be Serbian citizens by birth, of the Eastern Orthodox faith, who enjoyed all civil and political rights, who are 40 years old, and who are ministers, or state advisers, military generals, or ministers accredited to foreign courts, or ones that used to be. The election of the regents was always done by secret ballot.

The civil list (salary) of kings was determined by laws. Once determined, the civil list could not be increased without the consent of the National Assembly, nor could it be reduced without the consent of the king. It was determined that each regent would receive 60,000 dinars per year from the king's civil list during the performance of his duties as a regent.

Before accepting the royal authority, the regents took an oath in front of the Assembly that elected them: that they would be faithful to the king and that they would rule according to the Constitution and the laws of the country. They then announced to the people with a proclamation that they had received royal authority in the name of the king.

During the time the king is under age, no changes could be made to the Constitution.

If the king was prevented from exercising royal authority, the heir to the throne would rule in his name if he is of legal age. But if the heir to the throne is a minor, the king could appoint temporary regents.

If the king, during his lifetime, abdicated the throne in favor of his underage heir, he had the right to appoint three regents at that time. All the provisions of this Constitution relating to regents elected by the National Assembly were valid for regents appointed in this manner .

In the event that a member of the Regency dies or becomes so ill that, according to the opinion of three doctors appointed by the State Council at the invitation of the other two regents and in agreement with them, he would no longer be able to perform his duties, or finally if he resigns, the remaining two regents would handle state affairs until the next session of the National Assembly, which will elect the third regent. If one of the three regents had an urgent need to leave the country for a period of time, the other two regents could conduct unrestricted state affairs during his absence. But in that case, he was obliged to leave a written statement to his comrades saying that he agreed in advance to everything that they would do within their authority prescribed by the Constitution.

"

In all cases in which, according to the provisions of this Constitution, regents were to be elected, the Council of Ministers temporarily exercised royal constitutional authority as its responsibility. The Council of Ministers was then obliged to immediately announce to the people with a proclamation that, as a result of specified circumstances, it had accepted royal authority. In the event that the throne is left without an heir, according to the provisions of this Constitution, the Council of Ministers would take up royal authority. It was then obliged to convene a Great National Assembly no later than a month from the day of the king's death to decide on the future of the throne.

==== National Assembly ====
The National Assembly was given a central place in the Constitution because more than a quarter of its articles were dedicated to it. According to the provisions of this constitution, the National Assembly received for the first time the right of legislative initiative, i.e., the right to propose laws, as well as the right to elect its representatives by secret ballot. It was elected for three years. The National Assembly met regularly once a year, starting on November 1. With the Constitution of 1888, the Assembly finally received the right of legislative initiative; it had the exclusive right to cut taxes and full budget rights (the king, of course, had the right to extend the budget, but for a maximum of four months).

===== Election of people's representatives =====
The constitutional reform included the free election of people's representatives. The condition of freedom of elections was that the elections follow the principles of direct elections and secret ballots, but the constitutional committee was not unanimous in this decision. The prevailing opinion was that the secret ballot voting system should be implemented (it was done with the use of marbles), which represented the democratic legacy of the Constitution of 1888. Elections were direct, and all MPs were elected. Government MPs were abolished. The Constitution sought to make the elections and the composition of the Assembly completely independent from the influence of the executive authority.

The right to vote was given to citizens who turned 21 and paid at least 15 dinars in direct taxes to the state (tax census). Collective members have the right to vote, regardless of how much they pay in direct taxes. Officers and soldiers did not have active or passive voting rights. Even police officials did not have the right to be elected, while other officials, if elected, had to leave the civil service. Regarding the distribution of mandates, two basic principles were adopted: 1) grouping of all voters by electoral district and voting for the district candidate list, not for a person; and 2) division of parliamentary seats by a quotient in proportion to the number of votes from all lists in the respective electoral district, ensuring the participation of the minority in the National Assembly. This principle of proportional representation, the so-called D'Hondt method, was new in European constitutional practice and provided in the Danish constitution. The constitution fully guarantees parliamentary immunity of MPs.

===== The structure of the National Assembly =====
In regards to the structure of the assembly, an extensive debate developed in the committee. Supporters of the bicameral assembly explained their position by citing the need to ensure the participation of the intelligentsia in the legislation in order to raise the educational structure of the assembly and the efficiency of its work. However, the liberals and progressives tried to enable the representatives of the bourgeois classes, whose political representatives they were, to enter the assembly and thus create a balance between the radical peasant MPs. Instead of the upper house and government MPs, the Constitution of 1888 introduced qualified MPs. In addition to MPs with general electoral requirements, two MPs are elected in each electoral district with special requirements: that they have graduated from a university or higher vocational school at the level of a university, in the country or abroad. In this way, the request for the participation of the intelligentsia in the legislation was satisfied. The reasoning that was usually given for these proposals needed to be raised.

===== Legislation =====
The Constitution introduced equality in legislation between the ruler and the National Assembly. Legislative proposals could be submitted by the king to the assembly and the assembly to the king, i.e., the assembly received the right of legislative initiative, which it did not have under the previous constitution. No law can be issued, repealed, amended, or interpreted without the consent of the National Assembly. Adoption of emergency laws was not possible. Without the assembly, nothing could be changed in the legislation even temporarily.

Laws adopted by the National Assembly can be approved or rejected by the king. Having established the equality of the king and the National Assembly in legislation, the Constitution assumed that the king and the Assembly would always be in agreement so that the legislative body could function properly. Any disagreement between these two legislative factors would lead to an appeal to the people. In that case, the decision of the people should establish harmony between the ruler and the Assembly.

===== Budget rights =====
Budget rights are one of the most important rights that a parliament has. It is also the primary right of the parliament, with the help of which it has succeeded over time in introducing the political accountability of ministers and establishing parliamentary rule. The Constitution of 1888 granted full budget rights to the National Assembly. Every year, the National Assembly approves a budget that is only valid for one year. The budget must be submitted to the Assembly at the beginning of its work, together with last year's final balance sheet. This is how the supervision of the Assembly over budget execution was established. If the assembly does not establish the budget on time, it can extend last year's budget temporarily until the new budget is established. The king can extend the old budget only if the National Assembly is dissolved or postponed, and for a maximum of four months.

===== Political accountability of ministers =====
The new constitution expanded the rights of the National Assembly in the sense that MPs were given the right to question and interpellate ministers. Ministers are obliged to answer them in the same session. The National Assembly has the right to investigate electoral and purely administrative matters. The Assembly has the right to deliver to the ministers petitions, requests, and appeals addressed to it, and the ministers are obliged to provide all necessary responses on the content of those requests whenever the Assembly requests it. Through the right of questioning, interpellation, and investigation, the assembly is guaranteed the right to control the government, from which it clearly follows that the National Assembly could topple the government whose work it was not satisfied with. This meant that a system of parliamentary rule was introduced in Serbia.

==== Great National Assembly ====
In addition to the ordinary assembly, there is also a Great National Assembly, which was provided in the previous constitution as well. The Great National Assembly was twice as big as the ordinary one, and no qualified MPs were elected to it. It decides on the throne, elects the regents, decides on amendments to the constitution, on the reduction or exchange of any part of the state territories, and when the king finds it necessary to hear the Great National Assembly.

==== Council of Ministers ====
The Council of Ministers was "at the top of the civil service" and stood "directly beneath the king". The Council of Ministers was made up of ministers authorized for certain areas of administration and the president of the Council of Ministers, who may be without a specific department. All ministers and the president of the Council of Ministers were appointed by the king's edict. Upon taking office, the ministers took an oath that they would be faithful to the king and that they would conscientiously adhere to the Constitution and the law. The minister could only be a Serb by birth or a native Serb who has lived in Serbia for five years. No member of the Royal House could become a minister.

Ministers could be members of parliament simultaneously (the mixed government), which was not possible according to the Constitution of 1869. They were no longer considered the king's officials but as politicians who came to power on the basis of the parliament's trust. MPs in the National Assembly could pose questions and interpellations to ministers, and they were accountable for their "official acts" both to the king and to the National Assembly. The dual accountability of ministers is a characteristic of the so-called dual or Orleans model of the parliamentary system, as it existed in the French Charter of 1830. Every act of the king had to be countersigned by the competent minister, which made the ministers take political responsibility for the acts of the head of state.

In addition to political accountability, ministers also had criminal accountability, and upon accusation by the king or the National Assembly, they were tried by a special State Court (composed of members of the State Council and the Court of Cassation). Regarding the criminal accountability of ministers, changes were introduced in relation to the previous constitution. The King and the National Assembly could accuse ministers of the same acts as in the previous constitution, but the statute of limitations for committed acts only started four years after the act was committed. The motion to accuse a minister had to be made in writing, it had to contain the points of accusation and be signed by at least twenty MPs, and the decision on the accusation had to be made by the Assembly with a two-thirds majority of the MPs present. The king could neither pardon nor reduce the sentence of a convicted minister without the consent of the National Assembly.

Both the king and the National Assembly had the right to accuse the ministers: 1) of betraying the country and the monarch; 2) of violating the Constitution and the constitutional rights of Serbian citizens; 3) of accepting bribes; 4) for harming the state out of self-interest; and 5) of violating the laws determined by a special law on the accountability of the ministers.

==== State Council ====
The State Council, which was deprived of legislative power even by the Regency Constitution, retained its place among the constitutional bodies but was no longer the state body of the highest rank. Of its 16 members, eight are appointed by the king and eight are elected by the National Assembly. The king proposes to the Assembly a list of 16 candidates, from which it elects eight, whom the king appoints as advisors. The National Assembly, for its part, proposes to the king a list of sixteen candidates, of whom the king appoints eight as advisors. The vacancies in the State Council are also filled according to this procedure. The competences of that body were precisely determined by the Constitution.

State councilors could be Serbian citizens who have reached the age of 35, who graduated in Serbia or abroad from a university or a higher professional school that was of university-level education, and who spent 10 years in the civil service.

State councilors were appointed for life. They enter the ranks of other civil servants. Councilors could not be removed from their positions against their will or transferred to other positions in the civil service. They could not be retired against their will unless they had spent 40 years in the civil service, reached 65 years of age, or were so ill that they could no longer perform their duties. The president and vice president of the State Council were appointed by the king from among the council for a period of three years.

If the state councilor becomes a minister, his place in the council is not filled, and when he ceases to be a minister, he returns to his place in the council. Only if there were fewer members left in the Council than the number required by the law on the order of business in the State Council, the seats necessary for the council to work were filled immediately.

The education of the underage king would be taken care of by the regents if the underage king succeeded the deceased king; if he came to the throne after the abdication of the former king, the king who handed over power to him would take care of his education. The property of the underage king was looked after by the guardians appointed by the deceased king in his testament or appointed by the regents in agreement with the State Council if the deceased king did not appoint them. If the king did not leave a male offspring after his death but the queen was pregnant at the time of his death, the royal authority would be exercised by temporary regents: the president of the State Council, the president of the Court of Cassation, and the Minister of Justice, until the queen gave birth.

The State Council had the following duties:

2) to examine the legislative proposals submitted by the Government to the Assembly or which originated from the Assemblies initiative and to give its opinion on them. This opinion of an advisory nature was not binding for neither the Assembly nor the Government, but it had to be conveyed to the National Assembly in its entirety before it took the legal proposal in question into consideration. The Assembly and the Government could each set a deadline for their proposals by which the council has to submit its opinion; the council could request that this deadline be extended. But if, even after the extended deadline, the Council did not submit its report and its opinion, the Assembly would proceed to deliberation and resolution without it;

3) to draw up a list of candidates for vacant positions in the Main Control and in the Court of Cassation and Court of Appeals;

4) to make final decisions on appeals concerning elections for district assemblies and committees and municipal elections;

5) to judge civil servants as a disciplinary court;

6) to consider and resolve appeals against decisions of the ministers in disputed administrative matters. These types of decisions of the State Council were binding for the ministers;

7) to resolve disputes between administrative authorities;

8) to approve exceptional accession to Serbian citizenship;

9) to approve settlements between the state and individual persons, that would prove beneficial for the state's interests;

10) to decide whether, according to the law, there is a place for the seizure of real estate property for the needs of the general public (expropriation);

11) to carry out the tasks assigned to it by law.

==== Judicial branch ====
1) to prepare legislative proposals and drafts of administrative orders of public importance at the request of the Government, and to give the Government its opinion on the Government submitted cases;

There is only one Court of Cassation for the whole of Serbia, which does not judge the deed but only the law. This Court of Cassation also resolves disputes between the judicial and administrative authorities. The President of the Court of Cassation held the office of State Counselor.

No court may prosecute or hold anyone accountable if it is not competent under the law. In order to administer justice in the courts, there had to be at least three judges. Only for cases of minor importance, both criminal and civil, could the law establish courts overseen by only one judge. Justice was administered in the name of the king.

The court trials were public, except in cases where the court finds it necessary to exclude the public for the sake of order or morality. The judges consult and vote in secret, and the verdict is proclaimed out loud and publicly. In every judgment and decision, the reasons and legal provisions on which they are based must be stated.

The Constitution dedicates 11 articles to the judicial branch of government. It stipulated that the courts are independent and that they pass judgment only in accordance with the law. The judiciary was organized in three instances, consisting of first-instance courts, courts of appeals, and the Court of Cassation. It is strictly forbidden for the legislative and executive authorities to perform judicial duties, as well as vice versa. The establishment of extraordinary or special courts or trial commissions is prohibited under all circumstances. Judges enjoyed permanence and immovability, and other important principles of judicial authority were also provided: jury participation, convening and public trials, mandatory presence of defense counsel in criminal and misdemeanor proceedings, etc. All judges were appointed by the king.

A judge could only be a Serb who, in addition to other legal requirements for civil service, regularly graduated from law school in Serbia or abroad. In the first-instance court, only one who has reached the age of 25 could be a judge, and in the higher court, one who has reached the age of 30.

Judges held their titles permanently. A judge cannot be deprived of his title or, under any pretext, removed from duty against his will without a sentence of the regular courts or a disciplinary sentence of the Court of Cassation. A judge cannot be sued for his judicial work without the approval of the Court of Cassation.

A judge may be transferred only through a new appointment with his written consent.

A judge cannot be retired against his will, except when he reaches 60 years of age, 40 years of civil service, or when he becomes so ill physically or mentally that he cannot perform his duties. But in the last case, a judge cannot be retired without a decision of the Court of Cassation.

A judge cannot accept the performance of any other state service, except for a part-time professorship at the Faculty of Law.

A special law determined the composition, organization, and jurisdiction of military courts, as well as the requirements that their members must have.

From the entire part of the Constitution devoted to judicial power, the effort to organize the judiciary according to the highest standards already introduced in Europe is visible.

— Miodrag Jovičić

==== Main Control ====
Relatives: by blood in the direct line in any degree, in collateral up to the fourth degree final, and in-laws up to the second degree final, could not be judges at the same time in one court, nor could they judge together.

The members of the Main Control could be those Serbian citizens who graduated from law school in Serbia or abroad and completed 10 years of civil service, or who were finance ministers, or who have served 10 years as senior officials in the financial profession. But the president of the Main Control and two of its members had to be lawyers.

The positions of the president and members of the Main Control were immovable. They could not be dismissed from public office without the verdict of regular courts, nor could they be transferred to other positions without their written consent. They could only retire if they had completed 40 years of civil service, were 65 years of age, or were so ill that they could no longer perform their duties.

The main control reviewed, corrected, and liquidated the accounts of the general administration and all accountants to the state treasury. It made sure that budget expenditures were not exceeded and that there was no transfer of sums from one budget group to another. It finalized the accounts of all state administrations and was responsible for collecting all the evidence and all the necessary notices. The general state account was submitted to the National Assembly with comments from the Main Control, no later than two years, starting from the end of each budget year.

The organization and scope of work of the Main Control, as well as the manner in which its staff will be appointed, were to be determined in more detail through laws.

==== The Army ====
Every Serb was obliged to serve in the army. The term of military service, the method of service, and exemptions from personal service are prescribed by law. The law also determined what ranks there are in the army, how those ranks are obtained, and how they are lost. The organization of the army was prescribed by law, and its formation was determined by the king through a decree. The number of standing troops was determined every year by the budget law. Standing soldiers were tried for their crimes by military courts, according to the provisions of military laws. Provisions on military discipline and disciplinary punishments were prescribed by the king in a decree. No one could hold public office, if they had not, according to the provisions of the military laws, served their term in the army or had been released from military service. A foreign army could not be recruited into the state service. A contract for a foreign army to occupy or cross Serbian land was not valid without the approval of the National Assembly, just as the Serbian army could not be placed in the service of another country without the approval of the National Assembly.

=== Human rights ===
Great attention was given to the constitutional rights of Serbian citizens. This constitution, like the previous one, prescribed classic personal rights (that all Serbs are equal, personal freedom, inviolability of residence, inviolability of property, freedom of conscience, etc.). This constitution introduces political rights for the first time (freedom of the press, the right of assembly, the right of association, the right to petition and appeal, etc.), which were, in practice, directly guaranteed by the constitution. In addition, the declared human and civil rights were exercised directly on the basis of the Constitution, which is the best guarantee of their inviolability. A number of specifics have been introduced to protect those rights not only from abuses by the executive authority but also from restrictive interpretation by the legislative authority, which "completed" the Belgian model.

For the audit of state accounts, there was a Main Control as a special authority and a Court of Accounts. The Main Control had a president and four members. Both the president and the members of the Main Control were elected by the National Assembly from a list of candidates drawn up by the State Council, on which twice as many candidates were proposed as there were vacant positions. The members of the Main Control held the offices of judges of the Court of Cassation, and its president held the office of state advisor.

It was established in such a manner that is unsurpassed in the constitutional history of Serbia.

— Miodrag Jovičić

Catalog of citizen rights:

Disagreements in the constitutional committee arose in regards to the death penalty for political crimes, which was the subject of debate for a long time. The abolition of the death penalty was mainly advocated by radicals but also by members of other parties. King Milan was decisively in favor of the death penalty for political crimes, and he called the requests to abolish it a glorification of the Timok Rebellion. The committee proposed, and the Great National Assembly adopted, the provision on the abolition of the death penalty for purely political crimes, except for the assassination or attempted assassination of the king and members of the royal house, or in cases where, in addition to the political crime, another act punishable by death was committed, as well as for crimes punishable by death according to the military penal code.

The representatives of all three parties in the constitutional committee advocated for the freedom of the press. The Constitution contained all the guarantees for the freedom of the press in one extensive article: the press is free; censorship cannot be introduced under any circumstance; nor can any other measure prevent the release, sale, or distribution of writings or newspapers; no prior approval was required for the publication of a newspaper; nor could a bond be demanded from the writer, publisher, editor, or printer. Newspapers were banned in three cases: for insulting the king or members of the royal family; for insulting foreign rulers and their royal houses; and for calling citizens to take up arms. And in those cases, the government is obligated to take the case to court within 24 hours after the ban is issued, and the court is also obligated to enforce or cancel the ban within 24 hours. The press could not be subjected to any warnings from the government administration. The criminal responsibility of the writer is stipulated by the Constitution. In the absence of a writer, the editor, printer, or distributor is responsible.

The existence of freedom of assembly and organization and freedom of association are necessary prerequisites for securing and organizing public opinion as one of the conditions of the parliamentary regime. In the previous constitution, these freedoms did not exist at all.

==== Constitutional rights of Serbian citizens ====
How Serbian citizenship was obtained and lost, what rights it granted, and how those rights ended, were all determined by this Constitution and laws. All Serbs are equal before the law. The citizens of Serbia could not be given or recognized with the titles of nobility.

Personal freedom was guaranteed by this Constitution. No one could be held accountable except in the cases envisioned by the law and in the manner prescribed by the law. No one could be detained or deprived of liberty without the written and reasoned decision of the investigating judge. This decision had to be announced to the person being detained at the very moment of detention. Only when the culprit was caught in the act could he be detained immediately, but again, the decision on detention had to be communicated to him no later than 24 hours after he was detained.

The right to appeal to the court of first instance against the detention decision was available. If the detainee did not file this appeal within three days of the detention decision being announced to him, the investigating judge had to send the case to court without an appeal within 24 hours after the deadline for appeal had passed. The court had to issue its decision within 24 hours of receiving the case, through which it confirms or annuls the decision of the investigating judge on detention. This was an executive decision of the court. Authorities who violated these provisions would be punished for illegal deprivation of liberty.

Laws determined in which cases the court is obliged to release the detainee without bail or on bail, personal or monetary. No one could be tried by an incompetent court. No one could be convicted until he had been competently heard or legally summoned to defend himself. The punishment could only be established by law and applied only to acts for which the law had stipulated in advance that it would penalize them with that punishment.

A Serbian citizen could not be exiled from the country. He could not be exiled from one place to another in the country except for the cases expressly envisioned by the law.

Private residence is inviolable. The authorities cannot undertake any search or investigation in the domicile of Serbian citizens, except in the cases envisioned by the law and in the manner prescribed by the law. Before the search, the authorities were obliged to deliver to the person whose residence is being searched the written decision of the investigating judge on the basis of which the search is being conducted. The resident had a right to appeal this decision to the court of first instance. But the appeal did not prevent the search from being executed. The search was always carried out in the presence of two Serbian citizens. Immediately after the search was concluded, the authorities were obliged to deliver to the person whose residence was searched a certificate of the outcome of the search and a signed list of confiscated items for further investigation. Under no circumstances may the search be carried out at night.

Property is inviolable, no matter what kind it is. No one can be forced to cede their property to the state or other public interests, nor can the right to private property be limited for those reasons, except when the law allows it and with legal compensation. The penalty of seizure of property (confiscation) could not be instituted. But certain things could be confiscated that were either the product of a punishable act, were used as an accessory to it, or were intended to be used for it.

Freedom of conscience is unrestricted.

All recognized religions are open and under the protection of the law, as long as the performance of their rituals does not upset public order or morality. Any action directed against the Eastern Orthodox faith in Serbia (proselytism) is prohibited. Serbian citizens could not be spared their civil and military duties by referring to the beliefs of their religion.

Schooling is free if its performance does not upset public order or morality. Elementary education is mandatory, and it is free in public elementary schools.

The secrecy of letters and telegraphic dispatches is inviolable, except in cases of criminal investigation and war. The law determined which state authorities were responsible for violating the secrecy of letters and telegraphic dispatches.

Serbian citizens have the right to assemble peacefully and without weapons, while conducting themselves in accordance with the law. No notification to the authorities is required for gathering in a closed space. For open-air gatherings, which are subject to special laws and regulations, the authorities had to be notified beforehand. Serbian citizens had the right to assemble for purposes that were not against the law. This right could not be subjugated to any preventive measures.

Every Serb had the right to address the authorities in his own name with a petition that could be signed by one or more people. As a collective, only authorities and legal entities could submit petitions.

Every Serb has the right to appeal the illegal actions of the authorities. If the higher authority finds that the appeal is unfounded, it is obliged to inform the appellant of its decision and the reasons for not accepting the appeal. Every Serb had the right to sue state officials, as well as presidents of municipalities, serfs, and municipal officials directly and without any approval, if they violated his rights while carrying out their official duties.

Special provisions applied to ministers, judges, and soldiers in service.

Every Serbian citizen is free to withdraw from Serbian citizenship once he has fulfilled the obligations of military service and other duties he would have towards the state or towards private individuals.

Foreigners who are on Serbian soil enjoy the protection of Serbian laws regarding their person and their property. However, they are obliged to bear municipal and state tax burdens, if international agreements do not oppose it.

=== Territorial organization ===
The Constitution of 1888 retained the traditional territorial division of the country into districts, counties, and municipalities. It introduced self-governance as one of the most important democratic reforms. Self-governance was supposed to mitigate centralism and transfer certain government affairs to the authority of bodies elected by the people. Self-governance was introduced in districts and municipalities. There were fifteen districts, and in them, along with the state authorities, there were district assemblies and a permanent district committee as self-governing bodies. The Constitution did not contain a definition of counties, which represented the mid-level local self-governance, while municipalities, as the simplest and most basic units of local self-governance in the Kingdom of Serbia, had "their own self-governance", and as municipal bodies, the municipal court, the municipal committee, and the municipal assembly were envisioned, who were in charge "of carrying out municipal affairs". The task of the district committees is to take care of the improvement and preservation of educational, economic, traffic, health, and financial interests in the district. In short, the constitutional solutions of territorial organizations stood halfway between deconcentration and decentralization of government. Compared to the previous period, the new solutions represented a big improvement.

=== Institutions in the state ===
==== Church, School and Charitable Institutions ====
The internal administration of the Eastern Orthodox Church belonged to the Council of Bishops. For other religions, the internal administration belonged to their spiritual authorities. Spiritual authorities, both of the Eastern Orthodox Church and of all other recognized religions in Serbia, were under the supervision of the Minister of Church Affairs. The organization of the church authorities and theological schools of the Eastern Orthodox Church was established by law in accordance with the agreement of the Minister of Church Affairs with the Council of Bishops. Church authorities tried priests for crimes committed in the course of their priestly duties, excluding those crimes punishable by criminal law. Complaints against abuses by church authorities, regardless of the religion in the country, were submitted to the Minister of Church Affairs. Clergy and ecclesiastical institutions, in terms of civil relations and property, are subject to secular laws. The correspondence of the spiritual authorities of the Serbian Eastern Orthodox Church with church authorities abroad, councils, and synods was carried out with the approval of the Minister of Church Affairs. Official correspondence of other religions in Serbia with church authorities abroad, such as councils and synods, had to be submitted to the Minister of Church Affairs for inspection and approval. Official letters or orders of church authorities, councils, and synods abroad could not be publicized or executed by any church authority in Serbia without the knowledge and approval of the Minister of Church Affairs

All public and private schools and other educational institutions were under the supervision of the state government.

Charitable institutes or endowments for education and other similar institutions, which are founded by people during their lifetime or, in case of death, with their private property or funds, could endure only with the approval of the state authority. But the property of these institutes could not be considered state property and could not be used for anything other than its original intention or in any other way than originally intended. Only if, over time, according to changed social and other conditions, it turns out that this is not possible, this property could be used for other similar purposes, with the approval of the legislative authority and at the proposal of the manager of the property in question. The law specifies the manner in which this will be done, as well as the rights and duties of these property managers and state supervision of charitable endowments and funds.

=== State finances, state economy and state property ===
Every citizen of Serbia paid taxes to the state. The tax was paid according to wealth. No one could be exempt from paying taxes except in the cases envisioned by law. The king and the heir to the throne did not pay taxes to the state. No pensions, charity, or reward could be given from the state treasury unless it was prescribed by law.

Every year, the National Assembly approved the state budget, which was only valid for one year. The budget had to be submitted to the National Assembly at the very beginning of its work. Simultaneously, last year's final account was submitted to the National Assembly. All state revenues and expenditures had to be included in the budget and the final account. The Assembly could increase, decrease, or omit the proposed individual parts of the budget. The savings from one party's budget could not be spent on fulfilling the needs of another party without the approval of the legislative authorities. If the National Assembly could not determine the new budget before the beginning of the fiscal year, it could temporarily extend the budget of the expired fiscal year until the new budget is determined. If the National Assembly was dissolved or adjourned before deciding on the budget, the king could extend the budget of the current fiscal year by a maximum of four months.

The right to monopoly belonged to the state. The state could delegate that right to someone else, but only through law and for a certain period of time. Privileges (concessions) were granted only through law and again for a certain period of time.

State property consists of all movable and immovable property and all property rights, which the state acquires and holds as its own. Ores and minerals are state property. Only through law could state property be alienated, or it and its income pledged or otherwise encumbered. The king's private property was different from the state property, which the king freely used during his lifetime and in the event of his death, according to the provisions of the Civil Code. The expenses for the maintenance of those estates that were ceded to the king for his utilization were paid by the king.

=== Civil service ===
It is the birthright of all Serbian citizens to have equal rights to all positions in all professions of the civil service, if they only meet the conditions required by law. Natural-born Serbian citizens had the right to civil service only if they had lived in Serbia for five years. Foreigners, as well as those naturalized Serbian citizens who have not yet been settled in Serbia for five years, could be admitted to the civil service only under a contract and in certain cases that were expressly envisioned by law.

When appointing and promoting officials, attention was paid to excellent governance, ability, and vocational qualifications. In order to prove vocational qualifications, state exams were introduced in all professions of the civil service.

Each official is accountable for their official acts. Officials took an oath when entering the civil service: that they would be faithful and obedient to the king and that they would conscientiously adhere to the Constitution and the law.

The titles and salaries of public officials in all professions are determined by law.

The pension institution for civil servants has been retained. The law determines the grounds on which a civil servant can be entitled to a pension as well as the grounds on which a civil servant can be retired. A special fund was kept for the pension of the children and the widow of the deceased official, which was established by contributions from officials' salaries and pensions.

== Constitution in practice ==
Despite the fact that the text of the 1888 Constitution was prepared by a committee in which all three political parties had their representatives, there is no doubt that that constitution was the result of a political compromise between the abdicating king Milan Obrenović and the strongest political party in the country, the Radical Party. That is why that constitution is often, somewhat pejoratively, called the "Radical Constitution", even though a large part of the decisions from the constitutional project of that party did not find their place in it. The compromise was that, on the one hand, the Obrenović dynasty would keep the throne, but on the other hand, King Milan would agree to the introduction of a parliamentary system (Slobodan Jovanović calls the period of that constitution the "age of parliamentarianism").

Beginning in 1888, Serbian constitutionalism approached the models of the most liberal constitutional tendencies. Regarding the Constitution from 1888, "in our science and the public, there is a generally accepted assessment that it is the best Serbian constitution, of course along with its slightly more 'supplemented and corrected edition', the Constitution of 1903". Although that constitution also contained certain decisions that today seem very retrograde (for example, the state was not separated from the church), it was a very progressive constitution at the time it was adopted and long after as well. Therefore, the Constitution of 1888 is an extremely good constitutional text, taking into consideration the time and circumstances in which it was adopted. But perhaps its greatest weakness lies precisely in the fact that it was too modern for Serbian society at the time; that is, it was not a "mirror" of social reality in Serbia at that time. Even King Milan himself agreed with such an assessment:

Everyone was crying and demanding for a constitution to be as free as possible; that's why I granted it, wanting to bring the issue to the point of absurdity and thus prove that such a constitution is not yet for Serbia.

— King Milan Obrenović

".

Soon, unfortunately, it turned out that King Milan was right. From the moment it was adopted, the Constitution of 1888 was only in use for a little longer than five years because King Alexander suspended its implementation in a coup d'état in 1894 and reinstated the Constitution of 1869. The Constitution of 1888 experienced its "second youth" when the Karađorđević dynasty returned on the throne, in a somewhat amended and supplemented text, and it was formally applied as the new Constitution of 1903 (although it was essentially a repeated Constitution of 1888) until the "merging" of Serbia into the Kingdom of SCS. In both the first and second periods of use of that constitutional text, Serbia was a constitutional parliamentary monarchy, following the then-most modern trends of European constitutionalism.

Although it seemed that its adoption ended the struggle between the monarch and the people in favor of the people, it turned out not to be so. The constitution still allowed the monarch a great deal of power. He remained an untouched state body. The monarch remained the supreme commander of the standing army, which was a strong support for his power. The conservative political groups gathered around the king were not broken up and did not put up with the liberal conviction that the Constitution of 1888 gave to Serbia, which soon became evident. In addition, its provisions assumed a more developed social and civil environment than that of Serbia in the last decades of the 19th century.

The Constitution of 1888 deserved the high praise that it got. The constitutional provisions on the organization of government based on democratic foundations, the rule of law based on the law, and the freedoms and rights of citizens followed in the footsteps of the highest standards of European constitutionalism at the time. The implementation of those constitutional provisions, which required a lot of good will, patience, and subtlety in handling, encountered almost insurmountable obstacles. On one side were the opponents of the democratic and parliamentary system, embodied by King Alexander and former King Milan Obrenović. On the other side, the People's Radical Party, to whose credit the aforementioned provisions were mostly included in the Constitution, understood the parliamentary government as the government of the majority in a very literal way. When they got the majority in the Assembly, instead of appointing their own ministers and forming the Government, which is the essence of a parliamentary government, the radicals considered all positions in the state administration and the judiciary to be political positions, so they began to fill them with their own party members. The parliamentary regime, when understood literally and absolutely, quickly turned into a party regime or a party-state regime.

=== Quality of the text ===
The Constitution of 1888 has 204 articles, 15 parts and special transitional orders. The constitution was written, legally speaking, at an enviable level.

From a nomotechnical point of view, the constitutional text was almost flawless, devoid of ambiguous provisions and legal loopholes. The Constitution was prepared seriously, with the use of rich comparative experiences, mainly according to the Belgian model of constitutional parliamentary monarchy: "During the drafting of the Constitution of 1888, with the exception of the organization of popular representation and the electoral system, the Belgian Constitution of 1831 served as a model.".

== The end of constitutions reign ==
=== Coup d'état ===
The first of the three coups d'état that characterized the reign of Aleksandar Obrenović, was carried out at the persuasion of his father, the former king of Milan, on April 1, 1893. With the help of the army, Alexander prematurely declared himself of legal age, overthrew the regency, and changed the Government. This change initially suited the radicals, who returned to power, but soon, in January of the following year, with the return of Milan to Serbia, they were forced to retreat. The political game between Milan and Aleksandar continued through negotiations with the other two parties, liberals and progressives.

Harsh attacks by the opposition press and the fear of radicals returning to power after elections that would have had to be called according to the still-valid Constitution of 1888 were the reasons why Alexander decided on a new coup d'état. With the proclamation of May 9, 1894, he suspended the Constitution of 1888 and reinstated the Regency Constitution of 1869. Simultaneously, Alexander promises that the new constitution will be adopted as soon as the situation in the country calms down. The Regency constitution, however, was retained for another seven years.

In the Constitution of 1888, the provisions on the constitutional rights of citizens are elaborated more extensively and in greater detail than in the Regency Constitution, where no sanctions were outlined for their violation. The rights of citizens as individuals and the protection of their freedom from the highhandedness of state authorities are ensured. Exile of Serbian citizens from the country is prohibited, and exile from one place to another is allowed only in cases envisioned by law. The inviolability of the residence is guaranteed, and the manner in which the search can be carried out is prescribed. Other personal rights are guaranteed, and sanctions are provided for the violation of those rights.

By combining various parties with each other, he (Alexander) thought to keep them in balance with each other and, again, to be the master of the situation... On the other hand, he had a natural gift for political intrigues and combinations, and he managed to almost completely disband progressive and liberal parties, which he mostly used for his neutral ministries, and to form his own "fourth party" from their elements, which he could count on at every opportunity. The country was once again ruled by one party, only this time it was not a people's party but a party of the court.

— Slobodan Jovanović

Slobodan Jovanović writes about this period:

Pressure from Russia, to which he was turning more and more after the cooling of relations with Austria, pressure from the radicals, who after Milan's death took a harsher attitude towards the king, as well as the desire to quell the discontent over his marriage to Draga Mašin, were the reasons that made Alexander finally decide to change the constitution in 1901. This change was made by another unconstitutional act—the bestowing of the constitution.

=== "The Second Youth" - Constitution of 1903 ===
The development of trade, the growth of industry, and the increase in foreign trade changed economic and social relations in Serbia at the end of the 19th century. Discontent with the rule of Aleksandar Obrenović, whose personal regime was characterized by legal and social uncertainty, culminated in the murder of King Aleksandar and his consort, Queen Draga on June 11, 1903 (May 29, 1903 on the Julian calendar used at the time). The officers, who, under the leadership of Dragutin Dimitrijević Apis and with the help of a detachment of the Belgrade garrison, staged a coup, simultaneously declared Petar I Karađorđević as the new king of Serbia. The new king was officially elected at the session of the Assembly and the Senate, after having previously sworn on the new Constitution, on June 12, 1903.

The more political circles were in agreement with the election of the new king, the more opinions differed on the issue of the constitution. The older radicals advocated keeping the Constitution from 1901, while the younger ones, composed mainly of intellectuals, demanded the return of the Constitution from 1888, in which, with the support of other political parties, they succeeded.

The new constitution was promulgated on June 5, 1903, and although some changes were made in relation to the Constitution of 1888, its basic content remained the same. The Constitution of 1903 further restricted the powers of the king and increased the accountability of state officials. The right of the king to extend the previous year's budget for four months if the Parliament does not vote on the submitted budget is limited by the consent of the State Council.

After the adoption of the Constitution, some laws were restored that guaranteed the personal rights of citizens. These were the laws that, together with the Constitution of 1888, were abolished by King Alexander in 1894:

Law on Elections of Members of Parliament from March 25, 1890;

Law on order of business in the National Assembly from November 1, 1889;

Law on ministerial accountability from January 30, 1891;

Law on public assemblies and associations from March 31, 1891;

Press Act of March 31, 1891

Dragoslav Janković sees the reasons for political parties to opt for the Constitution of 1888 as ensuring the full power of the bourgeoisie instead of the monarch and says:

The power of the Bourgeoisie was secured through the parliament (National Assembly), and the reign of King Peter I Karađorđević is marked in our historiography as the age of parliamentarism.

— Dragoslav Janković

In order to describe the new situation in Serbia after the adoption of the constitution in 1903, we will once again use the words of Slobodan Jovanović:

In the new state, the royal authority almost completely disappeared. In a constitutional monarchy, two systems are possible: either the king rules under the supervision of the Assembly or the Assembly rules under the supervision of the king. In both systems, the king has a certain role: in the first, he is the one who takes the initiative and gives direction; in the other system, he is the one who resists and directs the government of the parliamentary majority. The first system was impossible according to the Constitution of 1888, but even that constitution left the king with that much power that he could have been a barrier and a check to the parliamentary majority. But the radical party believed that the king should not even perform this supervisory role because a true constitutional ruler must be passive. After Alexander's personal regime, which lasted for ten years and which they only remembered badly, the radicals did not want to hear about any kind of interference by the ruler in state affairs. In the new state, the royal power ceased to function, although formally, according to the text of the constitution, it still existed.

— Slobodan Jovanović

== The importance of the constitution ==
The Constitution of 1888 meant the victory of civil democratic principles for which the people of Serbia had been fighting since the first reign of Prince Miloš. Serbia was built as a monarchy, and from the beginning it had to overcome the basic contradiction in its internal organization: to preserve the democratic traditions of national self-governance and at the same time to build a strong state. The struggle over that took the form of a struggle between the monarch and the people. The rulers justified their personal regimes with the need to build a strong state authority, and the popular masses demanded constitutionality, parliamentarism, civil liberties, democratization of state administration, and self-governance. Just as the Constitution of 1869 was the work of liberals, the Constitution of 1888 was the work of radicals. With this constitution, Serbia became a civil, constitutional, and parliamentary monarchy.

The Constitution of 1888 was the final point of the struggle between the radicals and King Milan. The constitution was an expression of compromise between them because both the radicals and King Milan experienced political defeats, so the constitutional solutions represented concessions from both parties. The king was aware that constitutional change could not be achieved without the Radical Party, which was the strongest party in the country. After the Timok Rebellion, the Radical Party was no longer exclusively a peasant party, it increasingly became a party of the bourgeoisie, more inclined to compromise and eager to participate in government.

The compromise characteristic of the Constitution of 1888 did not result only from the agreement reached between the parties but also as a product of real social, economic, and political circumstances in Serbia. Given that Serbia at that time was not yet a bourgeois state with a developed civil class and appropriate social and economic institutions, it was understandable that the constitution retained a strong monarchical power and the remains of a strong executive power and bureaucratic mechanism. However, there is no doubt that this constitution based the political system of Serbia on the principles of parliamentarism and bourgeois democracy and that it represented one of the most advanced civil constitutions in Europe at that time.

The catalog of citizens' rights was established in a way that is unprecedented in Serbian constitutional history. The part of the Constitution entitled "Constitutional Rights of Serbian Citizens" contained all essential personal freedoms and political rights. In addition, the declared human and civil rights were exercised directly on the basis of the Constitution, which is the best guarantee of their inviolability. A number of specifics have been introduced to protect those rights not only from abuses by the executive authority, but also from restrictive interpretation by the legislative authority which "completed" the Belgian model.

== Literature ==
- Jevtić, Dragoš; Jovičić, Miodrag (1988). Constitutions of the Principality and Kingdom of Serbia (1835—1903). Belgrade: Science book.
- Jovanović, Slobodan (2005). Reign of Milan Obrenović III. Belgrade: Publishing company Geca Kon Prosveta.
- Jovičić, Miodrag (1999). Lexicon of Serbian constitutionalism(1804—1918). Beograd: Filip Višnjić.
- Krestić, Vasilije; Ljušić, Radoš (1992). Programs and statutes of Serbian political parties until 1918. Belgrade.
- Krkljuš, Ljubomirka (2007). Legal history of the Serbian people. Belgrade: University of Belgrade - Faculty of Law.
- Marković, Ratko (2020). Constitutional law. Belgrade: University of Belgrade - Faculty of Law.
- Mirković, Zoran (2019). Serbian legal history. Belgrade: University of Belgrade - Faculty of Law.
- Mrđenović, Dušan (1988). Constitutions and governments of the Principality of Serbia, the Kingdom of Serbia, the Kingdom of SCS and the Kingdom of Yugoslavia (1835—1941). Belgrade: New Book.
- Novaković, Stojan (1912). Twenty years of constitutional politics in Serbia (1883—1903). Belgrade.
- Orlović, Slobodan (2008). The principle of separation of powers in the constitutional development of Serbia. Belgrade: University of Belgrade - Faculty of Law.
- Petrov, Vladan; Stanković, Marko (2020). Constitutional law. Belgrade: University of Belgrade - Faculty of Law.
- Petrov, Vladan; Simović, Darko; Šurlan, Tijana; Krstić-Mistridželović, Ivana (2015). Constitution of the Kingdom of Serbia from 1888 - 125 years since its adoption (collection of papers from the scientific meeting). Belgrade: University of Belgrade - Faculty of Law.
- Popović, Milivoje (1939). The origin and origin of the constitution from 1888. Belgrade.
- Јевтић, Драгош; Поповић, Драгољуб (2003). Народна правна историја. Београд: Савремена администрација.
