= Dimitrije Katić =

Serbian politician

Dimitrije Katić (21 June 1843 – 20 March 1899) was a Serbian economist, politician and president of the National Assembly. He is known for his concise and clear and evidence-based speeches.

== Biography ==
Dimitrije Katić was born on 21 June 1843, in Crkvenac, near Svilajnac in the Resava district. In some sources, it appears that he was born in 1845. He attended a high school class in Svilajnac, then moved to the Belgrade School of Commerce at the Velika škola, which he completed in 1860. He worked in Belgrade for two years as a merchant. After his father's death, he returned to Crkvenac because he was the only male head in the family. He gained a great reputation in the village as an exemplary and literate man. He introduced newspapers in agriculture and animal husbandry, so his advice was also heard by the villagers of the surrounding regions. For the first time, he was elected Member of Parliament in 1874 and was almost constantly elected Member of Parliament (with the exception of 1884 and 1898). For many years, he was a Resava MP. He first belonged to the Liberal Party for a short time, then joined the group of Adam Bogosavljević. Even when he belonged to liberals, he criticized the liberal government, often more sharply than radical opposition. He moved to the People's Radical Party dissatisfied with the conclusion of a railway contract with Austria. He distinguished himself with courage in the Second Serbo-Turkish War, in which he was the squadron commander. He is the father of structural engineer Sima Katić.

== Political career ==
He immediately became a member of the Main Committee of the People's Radical Party. At the beginning of 1882, there was a final split of radicals and progressors over financial issues and relations with Russia. On 30 January 1882, Dimitrije Katić announced in the Assembly a break between radicals and progressives. Before the Timok Rebellion occurred at a secret radical meeting, he allegedly suggested that in the event of a rebellion all officials should be killed.

King Milan Obrenović IV was his political opponent, and unlike most radical leaders, he could not win him civil service or concessions. He was a member of the Constitutional Committee for the drafting of the Constitution of 1888. He opposed the existence of qualified MPs, who enter the assembly without elections. In contrast, most radicals have relented in this regard. He demanded unsuccessfully that the principle of national sovereignty be introduced into the Constitution, that is, that all power comes from the people. Unlike other radicals, at the Constitutional Committee session, together with Ranko Tajšić, he voted against the draft of the new constitution of 1888.

When the Radicals came to power, Dimitrije Katić and Ranko Tajsić also treated them as if they were the opposition. They were often known to be harsher critics of the radical government than the entire opposition. He embarrassed many radical ministers and chairmen of the parliamentary committees, who would have to receive their proposals, as Katić mostly won over the majority of MPs. In the assembly, he accused radical ministers of being mollusks and incompetent. When the opposition sometimes pressured the radical government hard, he did not obey the discipline of his party's parliamentary club but knew that he was on the opposition's side. He and Tajšić argued for the peasantry to be taxed as little as possible and to reduce official salaries, whether the radicals were in power or the opposition. They succeeded in their efforts to reduce the land tax and to increase the clerk's tax. The party often had to endure its opposition to the majority view. He served several times as Vice President of the National Assembly.

He was elected Speaker of the National Assembly in 1891. He conducted the assembly sessions with a lot of tact, interpreting the assembly rules as if he were a law professor. He was considerate of MPs and objectives with everyone. He enjoyed the voice of the Speaker of the National Assembly, who was able to rise above the party passions and clashes between parliamentary groups.

The Great Crisis occurred when 1891 voted to expel Queen Natalia Obrenović. Along with several Radicals and the opposition, he voted against the expulsion of Queen Natalia. He was outraged that the Radical Party, at the behest of King Milan, had violated the Constitution by opposing the Queen and opposed the people's wishes. Immediately after that, he resigned from his post as Speaker of the National Assembly. He remained a member of the Main Committee of the Radical Party until his death in 1899. In 1897, he founded a peasant cooperative, the second in Serbia.

== Sources ==
- Spomenica Beogradske trgovačke Omladine 1880–1930, belgrade, page 145-147.

== See also ==
- Kosta Riznic
- Vladimir Matijević
- Mihajlo Pavlovic
