= Raša Milošević =

Serbian politician (1851–1937)

Raša Milošević (1851–1937) was a Serbian politician and one of the leaders and a theorist of the People's Radical Party. His wife Dr. Draginja Draga Ljočić Milošević was the first female physician in Serbia.

== Biography ==
He was educated in Belgrade and St. Petersburg in Imperial Russia. He was seen as the major theorist of the People's Radical Party until 1883. He was a National Assembly deputy from 1880 to 1883, a trying time, and was sentenced to death for masterminding the Timok Rebellion, but received clemency prior to execution. In 1886 he served as the Minister of the national economy in multiple administrations, however, in the 1890s he withdrew from active politics, keeping the position of CEO of the national monopoly agency.

Milošević contributed to all Radical publications, wrote numerous articles, important brochures, and his political memoirs appeared in 1923.

Momčilo Ninčić was his son-in-law.
