= 1898 Serbian parliamentary election =

Parliamentary elections were held in Serbia on 23 May 1898 to elect members of the National Assembly. The result was a victory for the Liberal Party, which won 112 of the 194 seats.

== Background ==
The parliamentary elections of June 1897 had been boycotted by the Liberal Party, while the Serbian Progressive Party had been dissolved prior to the elections. As a result, the People's Radical Party won all seats in the National Assembly.

The Radical Party's Đorđe Simić remained Prime Minister, but was dismissed by King Alexander I in October 1897 and replaced by Vladan Đorđević.

On 14 March 1898 the Assembly was dissolved, with the intention of holding new elections. A decree was issued on 18 April setting the election date as 23 May. 194 members were elected, up to 65 additional members appointed.

== Campaign ==
The Liberal Party contested the elections in an alliance with the Serbian Progressive Party, while the People's Radical Party ran alone after failing to agree any alliances.

== Results ==
Amidst manipulation by the police, the Liberal Party won a majority of the seats. The Progressives finished second, while the People's Radical Party won only one seat. The appointed members were largely supporters of the Liberal Party.

| Party | Seats |
|---|---|
| Liberal Party | 112 |
| Serbian Progressive Party | 62 |
| People's Radical Party | 1 |
| Independents | 19 |
| Total | 194 |
Source: Hoare

== Aftermath ==
Sima Nestorović was appointed president of the National Assembly and Dragomir Rajović as vice president. Vladan Đorđević remained Prime Minister.
