= Association of Serbian Youth =

Student organisation in Serbia

The Association of Serbian Youth (Serbian: Дружина младежи српске / Družina mladeži srpske) was the first student organisation in Serbia, founded in 1847 by the students of the Lyceum of the Principality of Serbia.

The society was founded in Belgrade on 20 June 1847 by Lycée professor Sergije Nikolić and a few students, namely Jevrem Grujić and Milovan Janković. Later, their number grew with Petar Protić-Sokoljanin (1827-1954) and Dimitrije Petrović, who were the best known, and shortly before its demise in 1851 the society had some fifty regular members.

This organisation was banned and disestablished in 1851 because of their criticism of the Defenders of the Constitution.

== See also ==
- Liberal Party (Kingdom of Serbia)
