= 1889 Serbian parliamentary election =

- 26 September 1889

117 seats in the National Assembly 59 seats needed for a majority
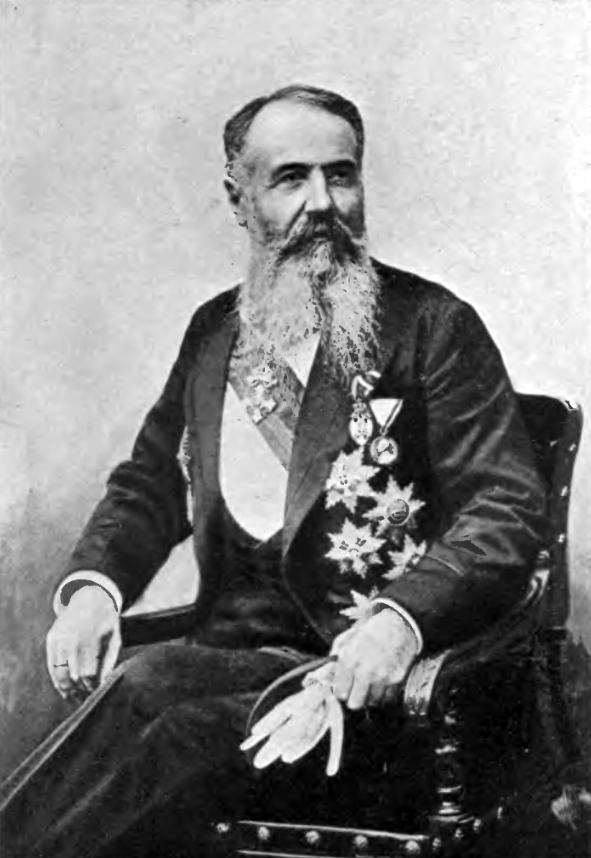

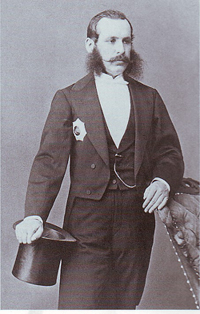
	First party	Second party
Leader	Nikola Pašić	Jovan Ristić
Party	NRS	Liberal Party
Seats won	102	15
Popular vote	158,635	21,874
Percentage	87.88%	12.12%
Prime Minister before election
Sava Grujić
NRS
Prime Minister after election
Sava Grujić
NRS

Parliamentary elections were held in Serbia on 26 September 1889. The result was a victory for the People's Radical Party, which won 102 of the 117 seats in the National Assembly.

== Background ==
The elections were originally planned for November, but was later rescheduled for September. After King Milan abdicated in February 1889, it was thought that fresh elections would be held shortly afterwards, but it was decided by the regents later in March that there would be no early election on the basis that Crown Prince Alexander was a minor and could not be required to take the Constitutional Oath before the National Assembly, and as the Regents had taken their oath in the presence of King Milan, the National Assembly was not required. This was in violation of the constitution, which required the regents to immediately call an election.

The Progressive Party chose not to contest the election.

== Results ==
Party	Votes	%	Seats
People's Radical Party	158,635	87.88	102
Liberal Party	21,874	12.12	15
Total	180,509	100.00	117
Valid votes	180,509	100.00	
Invalid/blank votes	0	0.00	
Total votes	180,509	100.00	
Registered voters/turnout	254,000	71.07	
Source: The Times

== Aftermath ==
The newly elected Assembly met for the first time on 13 October.
