= Lazar Dokić =

Prime Minister of the Kingdom of Serbia

Doctor Lazar Dokić

35th Prime Minister of Serbia
- In office 1 April 1893 – 5 December 1893
- Monarch: Alexander I
- Preceded by: Jovan Avakumović
- Succeeded by: Sava Grujić

Personal details
- Born: 27 September 1845 Belgrade, Serbia
- Died: 13 December 1893 (aged 48) Opatija, Austria-Hungary
- Party: People's Radical Party

Lazar Dokić (Serbian Cyrillic: Лазар Докић; 27 September 1845 – 13 December 1893) was a Serbian doctor, professor of anatomy, politician, academic and a tutor to king Alexander Obrenović. He served as Prime Minister of the Kingdom of Serbia as well as Minister of Education and Religious Affairs from 1 April to 4 June 1893 then to 16 June to 5 December 1893.

== Biography ==
Dokić finished elementary school and gymnasium in Belgrade and studied medicine in Vienna and Prague, back in Serbia he worked as a county doctor in Užice for fifteen years. During the Serbo-Turkish War he was a military doctor in the Šumadija Corps. After the war, he was Professor of Anatomy, Zoology and Physiology at the University of Belgrade. In 1883 he became a personal doctor of the Royal family and tutor of the young heir Crown Prince Alexander Obrenović. Known as a pro-Obrenović Radical, Dokić served as the President of the State Council (1889 onwards).

On 1 April 1893, the sixteen-year-old prince, while dining with members of the Regency, supported by the army and government members, but without the support of the constitution and the law, declared himself an adult and proclaimed himself the new Serbian king. The outcome of the coup d’état was the collapse of the Regency and of the cabinet. The young ruler appointed Lazar Dokić as President.

With the exception of the Ministry of the Military, the Cabinet of Lazar Dokić was purely Radical. Only two months later, Dokić got sick, and the king entered into conflict with the ministers which resulted with the departure of the Minister of the Military, Dragutin Franasović, replaced by Sava Grujić.

Dokić resigned on 5 December 1893. He died in Opatija on 13 December 1893.

He was a member of the Serbian Learned Society, an independent institution dedicated to the development of critical thinking, from 25 January 1870, and an honorary member of the Serbian Royal Academy from 15 November 1892.

== See also ==
- List of prime ministers of Serbia
- Sava Petrović
- Vladan Đorđević

Government offices
Preceded by Jovan Avakumović	Prime Minister of Serbia; 1893	Succeeded by Sava Grujić
Preceded by Jovan Đorđević	Minister of Education of Serbia; 1893	Succeeded by Milenko Vesnić
