= Ranko Tajsić =

Serbian politician

Ranko Tajsić (1843–1903) was a Serbian politician and people's tribune. He was a radical-socialist Member of Parliament, first elected to the National Assembly in 1874, and was one of the founders and vice-president of the People's Radical Party.

== Biography ==
Unlike other radicals, he voted against the draft of the new constitution of 1888 at a session of the Constituent Committee together with Dimitrije Katić. He fell as the last victim of the Obrenović absolutism.

He was sentenced to death after an assassination attempt on Milan Obrenović on Saint John's Eve, 1899 (in Serbian known as Ivanjdan according to Old Calendar), but the sentence was not carried out because Tajšić was already in exile in Montenegro under the protection of the royal family there. After an amnesty, he returned to Serbia where he died in 1903.

Broken down by persecution, trials, emigration, exhausted by illness and affliction, Tajsić is remembered to have stood upright in defense of freedom, parliamentary system, and democratic values.

== Literature ==
The source of most of the information on Tajsić is the thorough and informative Narodni tribun: Ranko Tajsić by Dragoje M. Todorović (published in Belgrade, Srpska akademija nauka i umetnosti, Posebna izdanja 550, 1983).
