= March 1888 Serbian parliamentary election =

- 4 March 1888
Prime Minister before	Prime Minister after
Sava Grujić; NRS	Sava Grujić; NRS

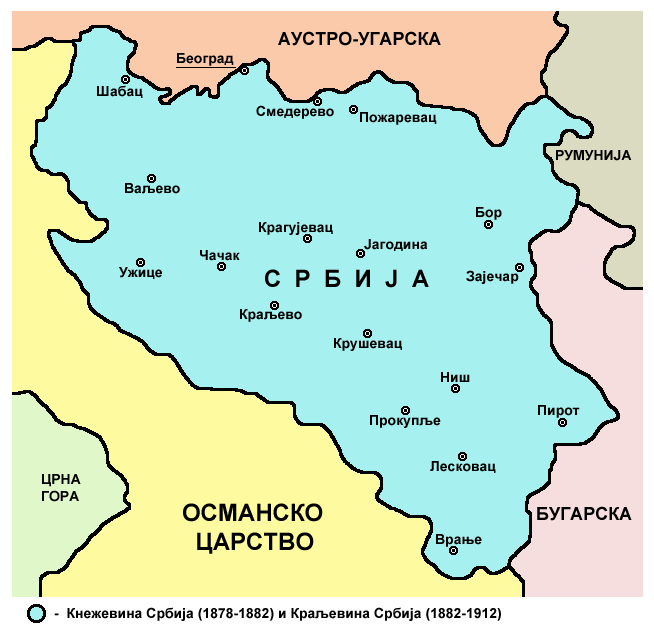
Principality of Serbia (1878-1882) and Kingdom of Serbia (1882-1912)

Parliamentary elections were held in Serbia on 4 March 1888 to elect members of the National Assembly. The result was a "great triumph" for the People's Radical Party, which won a large majority of seats. Of the 142 seats in Parliament, supporters of Jovan Ristić won only 13.

== Background ==
At the start of 1888 King Milan allowed the People's Radical Party under Sava Grujić to form a government. Being in power at the time of the election allowed the party to conduct the election as it wished.
