= Aca Stanojević =

Serbian politician

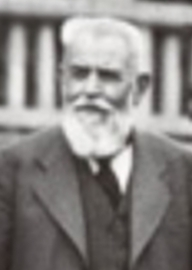
Stanojević in 1935.

Aleksa "Aca" Stanojević (1852 – 1947) was a Serbian and Yugoslav politician, one of the founders and leaders of the People's Radical Party.

Stanojević was a member of the People's Radical Party since its founding in 1881. He was long-term Party MP, he also served as Speaker of the National Assembly of the Principality and later Kingdom of Serbia for several terms.

After the death of Nikola Pašić in 1926, he was elected chairman of the main committee and a new leader of the party. Although he was a loyalist to the Karađorđević dynasty, he opposed the establishment of the 6 January dictatorship in 1929 by King Alexander I.
