= 1886 Serbian parliamentary election =

- 26 April 1886
Party	Leader	Seats	+/–
NRS	Nikola Pašić		
Progressive	Milutin Garašanin		
Liberal	Jovan Ristić		
This lists parties that won seats. See the complete results below.
Prime Minister before	Prime Minister after
Milutin Garašanin; Progressive	Milutin Garašanin; Progressive

Parliamentary elections were held in Serbia on 26 April 1886 to elect members of the National Assembly.

== Background ==
A new government was formed in Serbia in early 1886. Attempts by Jovan Ristić to form a government failed after King Milan refused to dissolve Parliament on the grounds that it was not a good time to have a general election during the Bulgarian Crisis. It was also thought that whoever controlled the government would be able to influence the election results.

However, after Milutin Garašanin formed a government, the King granted his request to dissolve Parliament.

== Aftermath ==
The new Parliament opened in July. Whilst Ristić could not be elected due to being in receipt of a government pension, his supporters won around 15 seats, with the remainder of the 78 opposition seats being held by members of the People's Radical Party. Pro-government groups held 82 seats, although 40 of them were appointed by the King. However, prior to the election of a new government, the incumbent government had several opposition members arrested or disqualified from voting, reducing them to 68 seats.
