= People's Radical Party =

Former political party in Kingdom of Serbia and Kingdom of Yugoslavia

People's Radical Party Народна радикална странка Narodna radikalna stranka
- Leader: Nikola Pašić; Sava Grujić; Stojan Protić; Aca Stanojević
- Founded: 8 January 1881
- Dissolved: 30 November 1945
- Headquarters: Belgrade
- Newspaper: Samouprava
- Ideology: Populism; After 1910s: Conservatism; Serbian nationalism; Yugoslavism; Until 1910s: Radicalism; Until 1890s: Socialism; Agrarianism
- Political position: Big tent; Until 1910s: Left-wing
- Sister party: Serb People's Radical Party (1905–18)

The People's Radical Party (Serbian: Народна радикална странка, romanized: Narodna radikalna stranka, abbr. NRS) was a populist political party in Serbia and later Yugoslavia. Led by Nikola Pašić for most of its existence, its ideological profile changed significantly throughout its history, shifting from socialism and radicalism towards conservatism in the early 20th century.

== History ==
The founding of the party was related to the circle of Serbian youth followers of Svetozar Marković and Nikola Pašić in Zurich. The leaders of this group proposed a political program in which they called for:

- change of the constitution
- freedom of the press and open politics
- judicial independence
- reform of the education system
- enhanced local self-government

The first main assembly of the People's Radical Party was in July 1882 in Kragujevac. The Radical's program, inspired by French Radicalism, was adopted, and Nikola Pašić was elected as the president of the central committee. The Radical Party had its own daily newspaper (Samouprava, "Self-Government"), which was critical of the ruling monarchy and demanded democracy, public liberties, and liberal reforms of the bureaucratic system. The Radical leaders, mostly educated at home and abroad, Pera Todorovic, Nikola Pašić, Pera Velimirović, Sima Lozanić, Lazar Paču, Jovan Djaja, Andra Nikolić, Ranko Tajsić, Lazar Dokić, Raša Milošević, Đura Ljočić, Gliša Geršić, Svetomir Nikolajević, Kosta Taušanović, etc. with other urban and provincial elites (Stojan Protić, Adam Bogosavljević, Aca Stanojević, Dimitrije Katić, Sava Grujić), were the first that successfully mobilized Serbian peasantry and the provincial middle classes (including teachers, peasant leaders and priests). Among others, Radicals attracted important intellectuals, diplomats, and university professors, such as Milovan Milovanović, Milenko Vesnić, Mihailo Vujić, Đorđe Simić, Jovan Žujović.

In September 1883, the Timok Rebellion broke out in eastern Serbia when King Milan Obrenović declared that peasants' arms should be confiscated by the army. He charged the Radicals that with their article Disarmament of the people's army in Samouprava, they had encouraged the peasants to refuse to give up their weapons. The rebellion was set down in ten days. Most of the party head committee was captured in the aftermath, apart from Pašić himself and a few others, who escaped to the Principality of Bulgaria. The régime sentenced many of these Radicals to death, including those who were in absentia. However, after some time, amnesty was given to certain Radicals who agreed to enter Obrenović's government in 1887.

The Radicals were instrumental in the adoption of the 1888 Serbian Constitution, which established parliamentary democracy, almost all of the political programs. The parliamentary rule was introduced, rights were guaranteed as well as the freedom of citizens and local self-government. Radicals disposed of, after 1889, with almost 80 percent of the popular vote. The Radicals were ardent supporters of the unification of all Serb-inhabited lands in the Balkans and adopted the slogan "Balkans to the Balkan nations". In foreign policy, strongly anti-Austrian, it was mostly Russophile and Francophile, supporting the Franco-Russian Alliance and the Triple Entente.

After the compromise with the Crown in 1901, the younger group within the People's Radical Party formed a dissident faction in 1901 that in 1905, after failed reconciliation efforts with Pašić emerged as a new political party, the "Independent Radical Party", led by Ljubomir Stojanović and Ljubomir Davidović that was in power only in 1905 and 1906. After the Great War, Independent Radicals were transformed into the Republican and Democratic Party.

After the return of the Karađorđević dynasty to the throne of Serbia in 1903 (following the May Overthrow), under the newly elected king Peter I Karađorđević, a single-chamber National Assembly was introduced, and the new 1903 Constitution was slightly revised version of the 1888 Constitution, annulled by Aleksandar I Obrenović in 1894. Serbia became a parliamentary and constitutional monarchy. After the revolutionary government in 1903, the Radicals of Pašić formed several governments that began the important reforms of the nation.

The Radical governments led the Kingdom of Serbia through its Golden Age (1903–1914), as well as through the First World War. In 1917, the Yugoslav Committee signed the Corfu Declaration with Nikola Pašić, calling for the formation of a South Slavic state. After the war, the State of Slovenes, Croats, and Serbs was formed from lands previously part of the Austro-Hungarian Empire by the Croatian Parliament and others. Prince Alexander, citing the Corfu Declaration, declared the Kingdom of Serbs, Croats, and Slovenes. The Croatian Parliament voted to incorporate itself into the National Assembly of the State of Slovenes, Croats, and Serbs, and it was represented by it. The representatives of the National Assembly agreed to merge with the Kingdom of Serbia.

The Kingdom's prime ministers from 1918 to 1928 were all Serbian with the People's Radical Party holding the prime ministry for eight of the years. In the National Assembly, outdated electoral rules and Yugoslav police actions against opponents of the royal family favoured the Radical Party. For example, in the 1923 elections, the party received a quarter of the kingdom's vote, but census results from 1910 assigned Serbia a greater representation, and the Radical Party took just over a third of the Assembly's seats.

After Pašić's death in 1926, Aca Stanojević became the party's president. In 1929, King Alexander declared a personal rule banning the People's Radical Party and others. Certain members of the party entered into Alexander's governments, and Stanojević called for the end of the royal dictatorship and the return to parliamentary democracy and local self-government.

== Radical Prime Ministers ==
Prime Minister of Serbia	Years
Sava Grujić	1888; 1889–1891; 1893–1894; 1903–1904; 1906
Nikola Pašić	1891–1892; 1904–1905; 1906–1908; 1909–1911; 1912–1918
Lazar Dokić	1893
Đorđe Simić	1894; 1896–1897
Svetomir Nikolajević	1894
Mihailo Vujić	1901–1902
Petar Velimirović	1902; 1908–1909
Milovan Milovanović	1911–1912
Marko Trifković	1912

Prime Minister of Kingdom of Serbs, Croats and Slovenes	Years
Nikola Pašić	1918; 1921–1924; 1924–1926
Stojan Protić	1918–1919; 1920
Milenko Vesnić	1921–1922
Nikola Uzunović	1926–1927
Velimir Vukićević	1927–1928

== Electoral performance ==
=== Kingdom of Serbia ===
Year	Leader	Popular vote	% of popular vote	# of seats	Seat change	Status
1883	Nikola Pašić	Unknown		72 / 170	▲72	government
1884	Nikola Pašić	Unknown		14 / 174	▼58	opposition
1886	Nikola Pašić	Unknown		78 / 160	▲64	government
1887	Nikola Pašić	Unknown		78 / 208	0	government
Mar 1888	Nikola Pašić	Unknown		156 / 208	▲78	government
Nov 1888	Nikola Pašić	Unknown		500 / 628	▲422	government
1889	Nikola Pašić	158,635	87.88%	102 / 117	▼320	government
1890	Nikola Pašić	Unknown		102 / 116	0	government
Mar 1893	Nikola Pašić	Unknown		57 / 128	▼45	government
May 1893	Nikola Pašić	Unknown		126 / 136	▲69	government
1895	Nikola Pašić	Unknown		2 / 240	▼124	opposition
1897	Nikola Pašić	Unknown		254 / 254	▲252	government
1898	Nikola Pašić	Unknown		1 / 194	▼251	opposition
Sep 1903	Nikola Pašić	95,883	36.00%	75 / 160	▲74	government
1905	Nikola Pašić	88,834	30.20%	55 / 160	▼20	opposition
1906	Nikola Pašić	157,857	42.70%	91 / 160	▲36	government
1908	Nikola Pašić	175,667	43.60%	84 / 160	▼7	government
1912	Nikola Pašić	182,479	39.80%	84 / 160	0	government

=== Kingdom of Yugoslavia ===
Year	Leader	Popular vote	% of popular vote	# of seats	Seat change	Coalition	Status
1920	Nikola Pašić	284,575	17.7%	91 / 419	▲91	–	government
1923	Nikola Pašić	562,213	25.9%	108 / 312	▲17	–	government
1925	Nikola Pašić	702,573	28.8%	123 / 315	▲15	–	government
1927	Aca Stanojević	742,111	31.9%	112 / 315	▼9	–	government
1931	Aca Stanojević	Banned		0 / 305	▼112	–	opposition
1935	Aca Stanojević	Did not participate		0 / 370	0	–	opposition
1938	Aca Stanojević	1,643,783 (Note: Coalition total)	54.1%	306 / 371	▲306	JRZ	government
1945	Aca Stanojević	Election boycott (Note: Shortly after the election, the People's Radical Party and other political parties were banned by the new communist government.)		0 / 354	▼306	–	opposition

== Bibliography ==
- Bataković, Dušan T., ed. (2005). Histoire du peuple serbe [History of the Serbian People] (in French). Lausanne: L’Age d’Homme. ISBN 9782825119587.
- Alex N. Dragnich, Nikola Pašić, Serbia and Yugoslavia, New Brunswick, New Jersey 1974.
- Alex N.Dragnich, The Development of Parliamentary Government in Serbia, East European Monographs, Boulder Colorado 1978.
- Michael Boro Petrovich, The History of Modern Serbia 1804-1918, 2 vols. I-II, Harcourt Brace Jovanovich, New York 1976.
- Gale Stokes, Politics as Development. The Emergence of Political Parties in Nineteenth-Century Serbia, Durham and London, Duke University Press 1990.
- Milan St.Protić, «The French Radical Movement and the Radical party in Serbia. A Parallel Analysis of Ideologies», in: Richard B. Spence, Linda L. Nelson (eds.), Scholar, Patriot, Mentor. Historical Essays in Honor of Dimitrije Djordjević, East European Monographs, Boulder Colorado 1992.
- Раденић, Андрија (1988). Радикална странка и тимочка буна : историја Радикалне странке : доба народњаштва [The Radical Party and Timok Rebellion]. Vol. 2. Зајечар: Историјски архив Тимочка крајина.
