= Kosta Taušanović =

- Kosta Taušanović in 1889
- Born: Коста Таушановић; April 5, 1854; Aleksinac, Principality of Serbia
- Died: January 26, 1902 (aged 47); Rijeka, Austria-Hungary
- Occupation(s): politician, minister and banker
- Known for: prominent member of the People's Radical Party

Kosta Taušanović (May 4, 1854 in Aleksinac – January 26, 1902 in Rijeka) was a Serbian politician, minister and banker. He studied agriculture in Tábor (then in Austria-Hungary, today in the Czech Republic) and commerce in Hohenheim (Germany). Taušanović was a prominent member of the People's Radical Party, among its founding members and one of the closest collaborators of its leader Nikola Pašić. A Russophile, and an opponent of the Obrenović dynasty, Taušanović was persecuted by the Royal government on several occasions. After the Timok Rebellion (1883) he was, along with many other Radical leaders, sentenced to eight years in prison, but was pardoned in early 1886. He was a negotiator of the Liberal-Radical Coalition of 1886. He was again in trouble with the authorities due to his Radical affiliation after the assassination attempt against ex-King Milan Obrenović (1889), as well as during the so-called Čebinac affair (1894).

== Career ==
A Radical deputy in the Serbian Parliament (1880-1883), serving as a chairman of the Great Constitutional Assembly, he was one of the key figures in the process of the adoption of the highly liberal 1888 constitution of Serbia. Besides being a deputy in the Serbian parliament, Taušanović was, after the abdication of King Milan Obrenović, a Minister in several governments (Minister of Interior 1889-1891 in Grujić's cabinet, Minister of Economy 1891-1892 in Pašić's Cabinet), and founder of the first insurance company in Serbia, as well as the Serbian Lottery (Srpska Lutrija) and the Serbian Shipping Company (Srpsko Brodarsko Drustvo). In 1895 he was instrumental in founding the Serbian Bank in Zagreb. As Minister of Interior, he was criticized for not acting strongly against attacks by a mob on the members of the Progressive party in the streets of Serbian cities in May 1889. He was elected president of the Serbian Society of Journalists in 1899. Jointly with another prominent Radical leader, Jovan Đaja, Kosta Taušanović launched the Narod (The People) daily. In the mid-1890s, he distanced himself from Pašić and formed a separate faction within the National Radical Party. In 1899, sentenced for alleged participation in the assassination attempt against ex-king Milan, Taušanović was sentenced to nine years in prison only to be pardoned again in 1900. He left prison in bad health.

Taušanović was considered one of the most entrepreneurial Serbian politicians, an expert for both the banking and insurance system. He was highly successful in business, serving as chairman of Beogradska zadruga, Trgovačka zadruga and Izvozna Banka. In Beogradska zadruga (Belgrade Co-op) he founded the first Serbian insurance society; in Trgovačka zadruga (Merchant Co-op), he redirected their business into export of livestock; at Izvozna banka (Export Bank) he contributed greatly to the company's establishment as a serious enterprise. Only in Ottoman-held Macedonia did Taušanović's attempt to establish financial institutions not provide expected results.

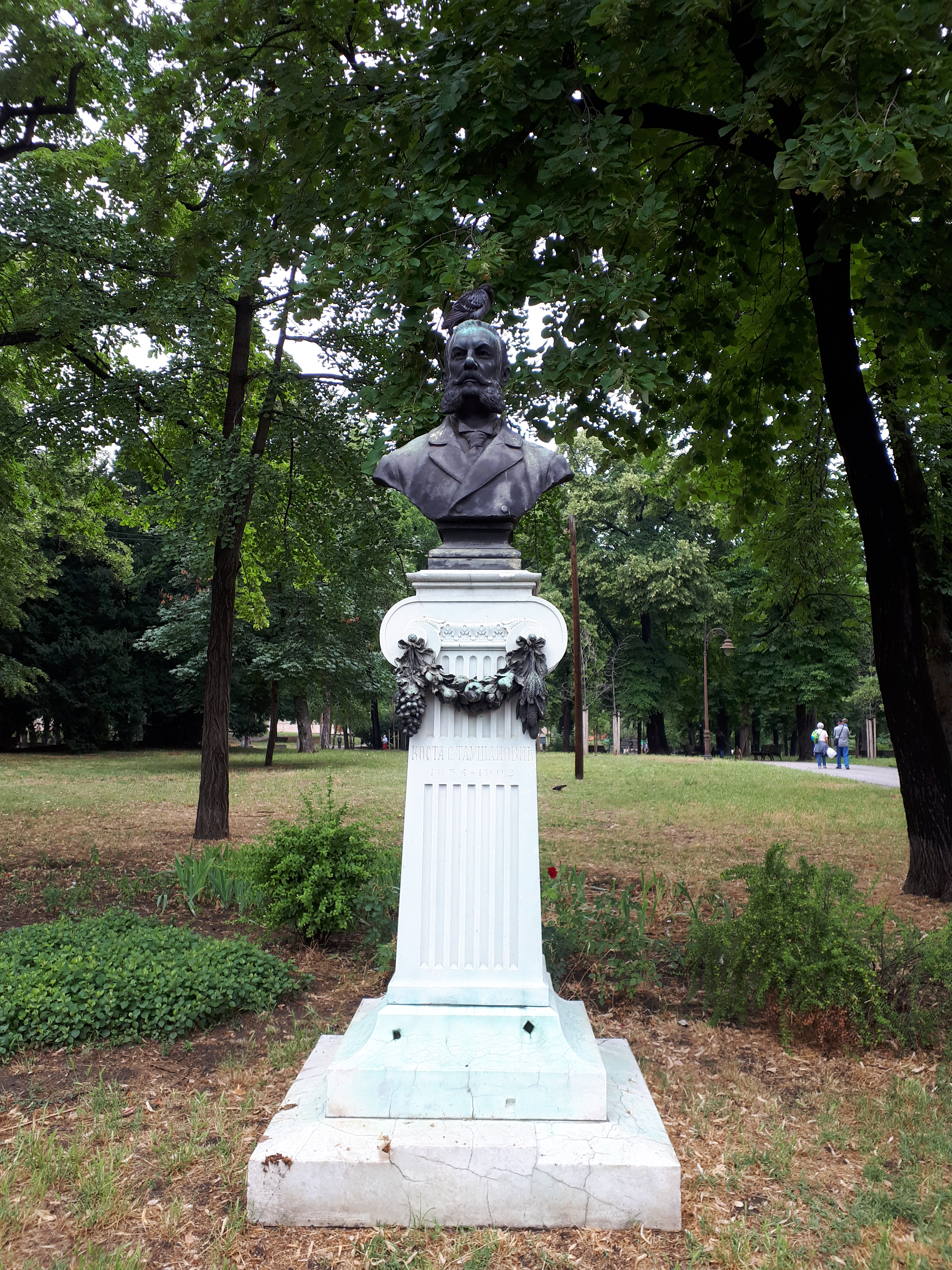
The bust of Kosta Taušanović at the entrance of the Kalemegdan Park

His friends and admirers erected a monument of him at the entrance of the Kalemegdan Park (formerly the city fortress) in downtown Belgrade.

== Work ==
In 1879, Kosta Taušanović translated Čeněk Hevera's Švýcarsko, jeho ústava, jeho vláda, jeho samospráva ("Switzerland, Her Constitution, Government, and Self-Government") which was published the following year.
