= Liberalism in Serbia =

Liberalism in Serbia is limited to liberal parties with substantial support, mainly proved by having had a representation in parliament. The sign ⇒ denotes another party in that scheme. For inclusion in this scheme it is not necessary so that parties labeled themselves as a liberal party.

== Introduction ==
Liberal parties were active in former Serbia and later in Yugoslavia. After the restoration of democracy liberal factions became active again.

== The timeline ==
=== From Liberals to Nationalists ===
- 1848: Beginning of differentiating of political currents, liberals noticeable next to the conservatives
- 1858: Liberals organized themselves though not yet as political party in the modern sense
- 1881: The group established the Society for the promotion of Serbian Literature (Дружина за помагање српске књижевности) NGO
- 1883: The organization is formed into a political party: Liberal Party (Либерална странка)
- 1904: A left-wing faction seceded as the ⇒ Liberal Democratic Party (Либерално демократска странка) returning to original liberal ideas, the remainder continues as the National Party (Национална странка) straying far away from liberalism
- 1905: The ⇒ Liberal Democratic Party reunited the National Party into the People's Party (Народна странка) of the liberal center
- 1919: The party merged with the Independent Radical Party and the Serbian Progressive Party (among many others) into the ⇒ Yugoslav Democratic Party

=== Progressive Party ===
- 1842: The Constitution-defenders (Уставобранитељи) are organized, first forefathers of the progressives
- 1868: The Young Conservatives are organized, although not yet as a political party
- 1881: The Serbian Progressive Party (Српска напредна странка) is founded with many strong liberal ideas
- 1896: The party dissolved
- 1906: The party is reestablished, fully reformed
- 1914: The conservative faction seceded as the Serbian Conservative Party (Конзервативна странка)
- 1919: The party merged with the People's Party and the Independent Radical Party (along with many others) into the ⇒ Yugoslav Democratic Party
- 1920: The party is reestablished by the remainder that didn't join into the Democrats
- 1925: The party ceased to exist

=== Radical Party ===
- 1881: People's Radical Party (Народна радикална странка) was founded as a classical radical party.
- 1903: Liberal wing secedes from the People's Radical Party and forms the Independent Radical Party (Самостална радикална странка)
- 1919: The Independent Radical Party merges with the ⇒ Serbian Progressive Party and the People's Party, along with many other political forces from former Austria-Hungary into the pan-Yugoslav ⇒ State Party of Serbian, Croatian and Slovene Democrats

=== From Democrats to Liberals ===
- 1919: The Independent Radical Party merges with the Serbian Progressive Party and the People's Party, along with many other political forces from former Austria-Hungary into the pan-Yugoslav State Party of Serbian, Croatian and Slovene Democrats (Државотворна странка демократа Срба, Хрвата и Словенаца / Državnotvorna stranka demokrata Srba, Hrvata i Slovenaca)
- 1919: A group of hard-core republicans secedes
- 1920: The republican dissidents form the Republican Democratic Party (Републиканска демократска странка / Republikanska demokratska stranka)
- 1921: Republican Party is renamed as Yugoslav Republican Party (Југословенска републиканска странка / Jugoslovenska republikanska stranka)
- 1921: The party is formally named as the Yugoslav Democratic Party (Југословенска демократска странка / Jugoslovenska demokratska stranka) gaining a statute
- 1924: A faction formed the ⇒ Independent Democratic Party (Самостална демократска странка / Samostalna demokratska stranka)
- 1929: monarchic dictatorship is established and parties are banned
- 1935: preserving structure, the Democrats return into politics with the reintroduction of multi-parliamentarism
- 1945: Parties are again banned, JDS goes into pacifist resistance to Communism
- 1948: JDS is destroyed by Communists, but "Our Word" (Naša reč) emigrant newspaper is organized maintaining Democrats' ideology
- 1963: emigrants reform the party as the Democratic Alternative (Demokratska alternativa) emigrant movement abroad
- 1968: student liberal demonstrations in Belgrade, opposition to Communist dictatorship formed => Committee for the Protection of Human Rights (Комитет за заштиту људских права / Komitet za zaštitu ljudskih prava), considered predecessor of the modern Democratic Party
- 1982: Democratic Alternative ceases to exist
- 1989: Reestablishment of the party declared (Democratic Party (Serbia)
- 1990: The party is reorganized as a political party, but just in Serbia
- 1990: "Our Word" stops editing
- 1991: A nationalist group seceded as the Serbian Liberal Party (Српска либерална странка / Srpska liberalna stranka)
- 1992: Conservative wing seceded as the Democratic Party of Serbia (Демократска странка Србије / Demokratska stranka Srbije)
- 1996: A faction seceded as the Democratic Center (Демократски центар / Demokratski centar)
- 2001: The party changed its ideology to social democracy
- 2004: The ⇒ Democratic Centre returned into the Democratic Party
- 2005: A faction led by Čedomir Jovanović seceded as the Liberal Democratic Party
- 2007: ⇒ Civic Alliance of Serbia merged into the Liberal Democratic Party

=== From Union of Reform Forces of Yugoslavia to Reformist Party ===
- 1989: The pan-Yugoslav Union of Reform Forces of Yugoslavia (Savez reformskih snaga Jugoslavije) is founded
- 1991: The party is renamed in Serbia into the Reformist Party (Reformska stranka)
- 1992: The party merged with the Republican Club (Republikanski klub) into the Civic Alliance of Serbia (Građanski savez Srbije)

=== Civic Alliance of Serbia ===
- 1992: The ⇒ Reformist Party merged with the Republican Club (Republikanski klub) to form the Civic Alliance of Serbia (Građanski savez Srbije)
- 1996: A left wing faction seceded as the ⇒ Social Democratic Union (Socijaldemokratska unija)
- 2007: The party merged into the ⇒ Liberal Democratic Party

== Liberal leaders ==
- Boris Tadić
- Čedomilj Mijatović
- Milan Piroćanac
- Milutin Garašanin
- Stojan Novaković
- Ljubomir Davidović
- Milan Grol
- Zoran Đinđić

== See also ==
- History of Serbia
- Politics of Serbia
- List of political parties in Serbia
