= Adam Bogosavljević =

Serbian politician (1843–1880)

Adam Bogosavljević (Serbian Cyrillic: Адам Богосављевић; 1843–1880) was a Serbian politician, representative of the radicals and supporters of the ideas of Svetozar Marković. In the National Assembly, he represented the farmers and demanded a reduction in clerical salaries and the dismantling of the bureaucratic system. Together with Svetozar Marković and Nikola Pašić, Bogosavljević formed the "Zaječar trojka" of early Serbian Radicalism. Unlike the other two, he came from a wealthy agrarian family.

== Biography ==
He was born in Koprivnica near Zaječar in the Krajina district, son of a well-to-do cattle trader and landowner. He enrolled in the Faculty of Philosophy of the Velika škola in Belgrade, but at the end of his studies, he returned to his birthplace in order to devote himself to agriculture and to help his fellow villagers in modernizing their production and their overall emancipation, both social and political. During his studies, he was devoted to the work of the Student Society "Srbadija", a branch of United Serbian Youth, where he was among the most successful students of the generation.

Returning to his birthplace, he wrote for the Društvo za polsku privredu (Society for Agriculture) that published a newspaper, Težak (Peasant) and for the first half of the 1870s pursued a vigorous, but not so successful, effort to improve Serbian agriculture. It received informal support from the government and from the establishment in general, although few of its members were actually rural folk like Bogosavljević. In the newspaper, he presented his ideas on the improvement of agriculture and the education of the people. He held the office of President of the Municipality of Koprivnica for the rest of his life.

Bogosavljević was elected to the National Assembly in 1874 and soon became the leader of a small group of radical-socialist MPs. In the elections of 1875, the Radical-Socialists significantly increased their popularity strength in numbers in the assembly but during the Balkan Crisis of 1875-1878 remained a minority party just the same. They adopted the First International program and advocated free socialist communities that found greater support among the Serbian peasantry than government bureaucrats. Bogosavljević's victories in the assembly were few, but they increased his support among the general public.
