= Jovan Avakumović =

Serbian lawyer, criminologist, statesman, and Prime Minister of Serbia

Jovan Avakumović Јован Авакумовић
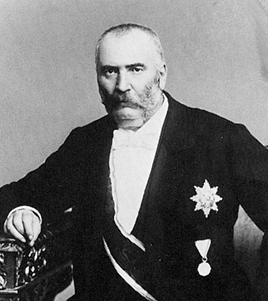

President of the Ministry of Serbia
- In office 22 August 1892 – 13 April 1893
- Monarch: Alexander I
- Preceded by: Nikola Pašić
- Succeeded by: Lazar Dokić

President of the Ministerial Council
- In office 11 June 1903 – 4 October 1903
- Monarch: Peter I
- Preceded by: Dimitrije Cincar-Marković
- Succeeded by: Sava Grujić

Personal details
- Born: 1 January 1841 Belgrade, Principality of Serbia
- Died: 3 August 1928 (aged 87) Rogaška Slatina, Kingdom of Serbs, Croats and Slovenes
- Party: Liberal Party

Jovan Avakumović (1 January 1841 – 3 August 1928) was a Serbian lawyer, criminologist, statesman, and Prime Minister of Serbia.

== Biography ==
Born in Belgrade, a descendant of a respected Serbian merchant family of Baba-Dudići, Avakumović was a nephew of General and Royal Regent Jovan Belimarković. He graduated from the University of Belgrade Faculty of Law, and studied law and state science (1862–1868) in Germany, France, and Switzerland. He was a member of the Liberal Party.

In 1873 he was appointed the First Secretary of Cassation, and in 1875 mayor of Belgrade, then head of the police department of the Ministry of the Interior in the Liberal government of Stevča Mihailović until 1880. That year he briefly became a justice minister in the cabinet of Jovan Ristić, but already in October the same year, the government fell and he was replaced by the Progressive Milan Piroćanac. In 1881–1887 he was a judge in the Court of cassation. In 1887 he was briefly Minister of Justice in Liberal-Radikal coalition government but resigned from the end of the year when the radicals formed a cabinet. Avakumović became operational head of the Liberal party and the opposition leader. Liberals then used tactics to oppose the ruling Radicals.

When on 9 August 1892 the Radical fell Avakumović became the Prime Minister and Minister of Foreign Affairs. The government was dominated by young liberals. All government actions were aimed at the parliamentary elections scheduled for 25 February 1893. After fierce fighting, in which the government used dubious methods, the result was a draw, and on 1 April 1893 King Aleksandar I Obrenović dismissed the Avakumović government and gave the mandate to Radicals. The Radical majority in the Assembly organized a political trial of Avakumović and some members of his government but they were granted an amnesty by the king before the verdict.

Avakumović became Prime Minister again immediately after the assassination of King Aleksandar Obrenovic and Queen Draga Mašin on 11 June 1903 (29 May under the calendar used in Serbia the time). Peter Karađorđević became the Serbian king and the Constitution of 1888 was restored.

During First World War the Austrian occupation forces captured him in 1915 and interned him in the camp Cegléd in Hungary and then Hietzing in Austria where he stayed until the end of the war. After returning from the captivity he withdrew from politics.

Avakumović was one of the best attorneys in Belgrade, especially in the field of criminal law. He has written many papers, and his most important works are: The theory of criminal law (1887–1891). Avakumović became a regular member of the Serbian Royal Academy in 1893.

He died in Rogaška Slatina, aged 87. Avakumović was awarded Order of the Cross of Takovo.

== Legacy ==
In 1902 Capital punishment for theft and other property, crimes were abolished by law. This amendment to the Penal Code was necessary because the 1901 Constitution had enumerated all capital crimes, excluding property crimes from that list. For many decades the main proponent of this reform was Jovan Avakumović.

== See also ==
- List of prime ministers of Serbia

Government offices
Preceded by Stojan Veljkovićl	Minister of Justice of Serbia; 1880	Succeeded by Milan Piroćanac
Preceded by Dimitrije Marinković	Minister of Justice of Serbia; 1887	Succeeded by Gliša Geršić
Preceded by Nikola Pašić	Prime Minister of Serbia; 1892–1893	Succeeded by Lazar Dokić
Preceded by Nikola Pašić	Minister of Foreign Affairs; 1892–1893	Succeeded by Andra Nikolić
Preceded by Dimitrije Cincar-Marković	Prime Minister of Serbia; 1903	Succeeded by Sava Grujić
