= Timok Rebellion =

1883 uprising in Serbia

Date	3–13 November 1883
Location	Timok Valley, Kingdom of Serbia
Result	Rebellion suppressed

Belligerents
(Kingdom of Serbia) Serbian Rebels: People's Radical Party; National Militia (part)	Kingdom of Serbia: Royal Serbian Army

Commanders and leaders
Aca Stanojević; Nikola Pašić	Milan I Tihomilj Nikolić

Strength
Around 3,000	2 regiments of the regular army

Casualties and losses
21 executed, 700 locked up	Unknown

The Timok Rebellion (Serbian Cyrillic: Тимочка буна, romanized: Timočka buna) was a popular uprising that began in eastern Serbia (now the region of the Timok Valley) on 28 September 1883, led by the People's Radical Party. It has been called the most important event in Serbia between independence (1878) and the First Balkan War (1912). The first battle occurred at Lukovo on 21 October, when the rebels defeated Royal Serbian Army forces sent to suppress them.

According to the Radical politician Pera Todorović, at a planning meeting of the Radicals' Executive Committee before the rising, one member suggested killing all bureaucrats. In the words of the Great Soviet Encyclopedia, the rebels were motivated by "such vestiges of feudalism as payment in labor and bondage imposed for the nonpayment of debts, as well as an unbearable tax burden, bureaucratic tyranny, and the growing power of commercial and usurious capital." Among their demands were a reduction in taxes, greater local self-government and the maintenance of the national militia. On 2 November, peasants across the region refused to hand over their weapons to military units unless they were given modern replacements. It took the reformed Royal Army only a couple of weeks to crush the poorly organised rebellion, which at its height had controlled almost half the country and had threatened the line between Belgrade and Niš. At the start of the rebellion, King Milan I was afraid that the soldiers would not "be willing to fire into the flesh of their own people", but his decision to pay officers double what top bureaucrats earned and to give bonus pay to soldiers who fought the rebels proved his fears ungrounded. The consul of Austria-Hungary in Belgrade noted that "a new page was written in the history of the Serbian people when the army launched its first shell at the rebels."

After the rebellion, many Radical leaders, including Nikola Pašić, fled abroad. Of the participants who remained, 809 were put on trial. Of these, 567 were sentenced to forced labour, 68 to prison, 5 to detention and 75 were released. The remaining 94 were sentenced to death: twenty were executed right away, one committed suicide, ten escaped and fled abroad and 63 were eventually pardoned.

== Map ==
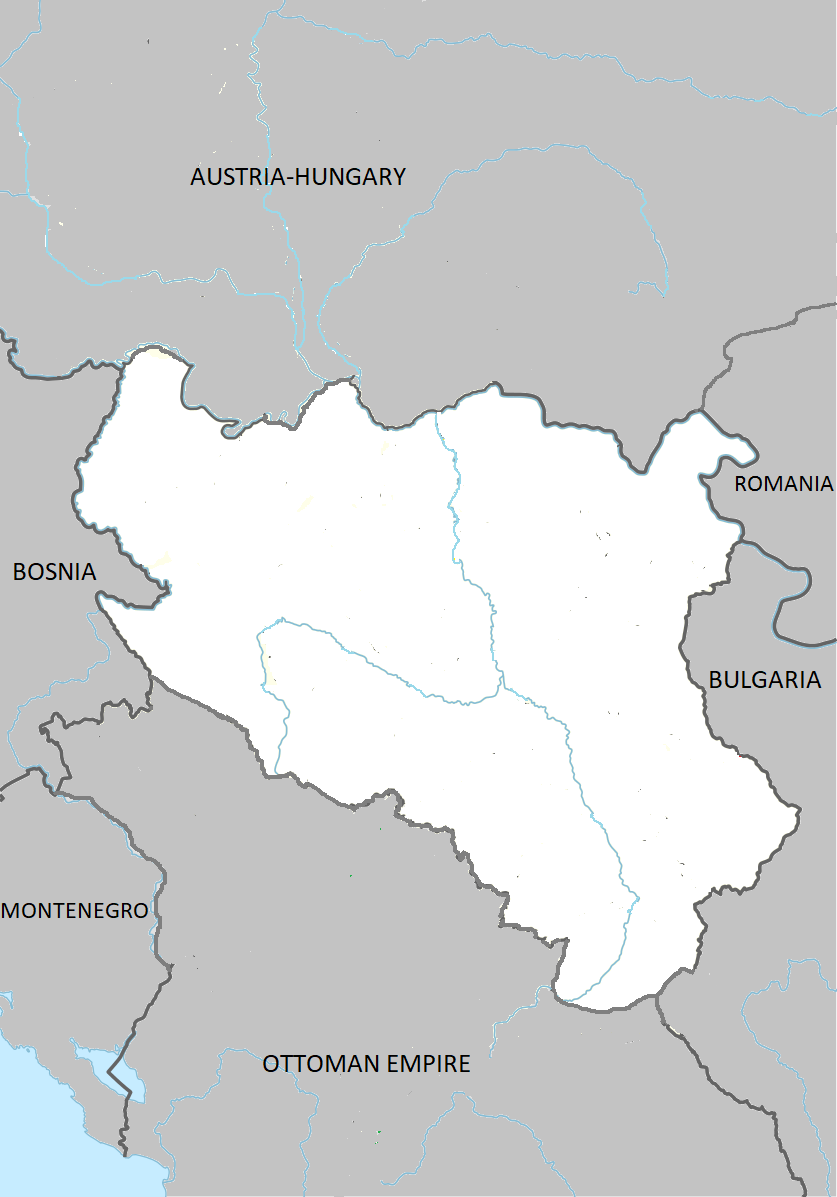
Timok Rebellion on the map of the Kingdom of Serbia in 1883. Towns and villages that have joined the rebellion are marked green.
