= Liberal Party (Kingdom of Serbia) =

Liberal political party in the Kingdom of Serbia

Liberal Party Либерална странка
- Leader: Jovan Ristić; Jovan Avakumović
- Founded: 1883
- Preceded by: Association of Serbian Youth; United Serb Youth
- Headquarters: Belgrade
- Ideology: Liberalism; National liberalism; Russophilia
- Political position: Center

The Liberal Party (Serbian: Либерална странка, romanized: Liberalna stranka; abbr. ЛС or LS) was a political party in the Kingdom of Serbia that was led by historian Jovan Ristić and lawyer Jovan Avakumović (1841–1928).

== History ==
The "Liberals" (либерали / liberali), an opposition group formed in the 1840s, established the Association of Serbian Youth in 1847 (banned in 1851 by the Defenders of the Constitution). These liberals participated in the May Assembly (1–3 May 1848) in Sremski Karlovci and the Petrovdan Assembly (29 June 1848) in Kragujevac. The liberals had an important role in the overthrow of the regime of Prince Aleksandar Karađorđević in 1858, which resulted in the return of the rival Obrenović dynasty. Liberals founded the United Serb Youth. Their ideas were close to those of Jovan Ristić (the later leader of LS).

The Liberals were Russophiles and Obrenović-supporters, closely linked with the Serbian Orthodox Church and especially with Metropolitan Mihailo who himself was a liberal. In national politics, they had the aim of liberation of all Serbs and were Serb nationalists. On the political spectrum, the Liberals were between the Conservatives and the Markovićevci (followers of Svetozar Marković, who later founded the People's Radical Party in 1881).

Liberals founded the Society for the Promotion of Serbian Literature (Дружина за помагање српске књижевности) in 1881, then transformed the organization into a political party, the Liberal Party, in 1883.

== Leaders ==
- Jovan Ristić (1831–1899), historian and diplomat, party leader in 1883–89
- Jovan Avakumović (1841–1928), lawyer, party leader in 1889–95

== Liberal Prime Ministers ==
Prime Minister of Serbia	Years
Jovan Ristić	1867; 1873; 1878–1880; 1887–1888
Radivoje Milojković	1869–1872
Stevča Mihailović	1875; 1876–1878
Jovan Avakumović	1892–1893; 1903

== See also ==
- Liberalism in Serbia
