= Miloš N. Đurić =

Serbian philosopher, translator, and professor (1892–1967)

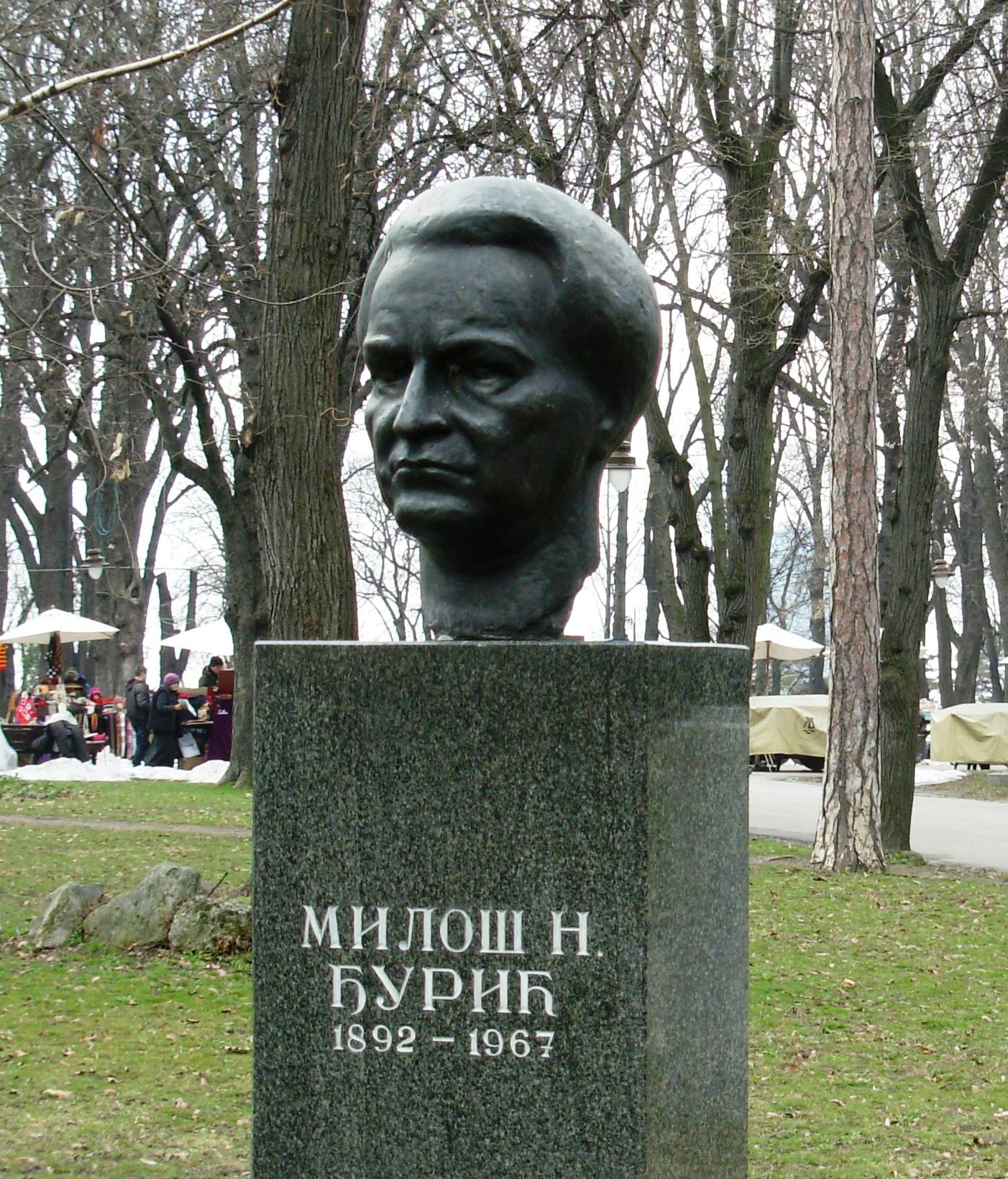
- A bust of professor Đurić in Kalemegdan Park
- Born: 14 January 1892; Benkovac, Croatia, Austrian Empire
- Died: 5 December 1967 (aged 75); Belgrade, SFR Yugoslavia
- Occupations: Classical philologist University professor Classical translator
- Children: Rastko

Miloš N. Đurić OSS (Serbian Cyrillic: Милош Н. Ђурић), was a Serbian classical philologist, hellenist, classical translator, philosopher, university professor and a full member of Serbian Academy of Sciences and Arts. Đurić's textbooks and translations of classic literary works such as the Iliad, the Odyssey and Poetics are still in use. According to Dr. Ksenija Maricki Gađanski, Đurić's numerous contributions to Serbian culture puts him on a scale of earlier Serbian enlighteners such as Saint Sava and Dositej Obradović.

== Biography ==
Born the eldest son of a family of eight, Đurić's father, Nikola, was a teacher and writer who introduced him to Serbian epic poetry, which would influence his future career. He began to write and publish poetry and literary criticism early in life. In 1918, Đurić was living in Osijek, where he tried to publish a work on Serbian epic poetry titled Smrt majke Jugovića. Austro-Hungarian state censors based in Osijek banned the paper on the grounds that it "threatens the national interests". Đurić graduated from the University of Belgrade Faculty of Philosophy and defended his PhD thesis at the University of Zagreb in 1929.

He worked as a teacher at a gymnasium in Zemun and Sremska Mitrovica where he published poems and essays in a local journal Serbia. He went on to work as a university professor teaching the history of Ancient Greek literature, a post which he held for four decades.

The puppet government of Serbia forced him into early retirement and sent him to the Banjica concentration camp. His only son Rastko died on the front in Slavonia in 1945. Đurić dedicated all of his works from that point on to him.

The Kornelije Stanković Musical Society of Belgrade elected him a full member, and Đurić later served as the president of the organisation. Between 1952 and 1957 Đurić served as the president of the Serbian Literary Guild, chief editor of several academic journals and a contributor to 96 journals and magazines. The Belgrade Psychoanalytical Society made him a full member, and he translated some of the most influential works of psychoanalytical literature into Serbian.

A complete bibliography of Đurić's works consists of around 400 titles containing more than 10,000 pages.

== Ethics professor ==
The World War II puppet government of Serbia demanded that notable intellectuals sign a document that demanded "order and obedience" from them and "patriotism in the fight against communists". Đurić refused to sign it on the grounds that more than half of his students were part of the Yugoslav Partisans. When a music professor stopped him and warned him the Germans would not forget his disobedience, Đurić answered: "It's easy for you. You play diple, while I teach students ethics!" This statement became a symbol of personal integrity in Serbian and Yugoslav society.

== Awards and legacy ==
Đurić was awarded the city of Belgrade's October Award, the Seventh July Award, the Order of Saint Sava and the Yugoslav Order of Labour. A street in Karaburma is named after him. The Association of Literary Translators of Serbia has awarded the Miloš N. Đurić Award annually since 1969. It is considered the most important Serbian prize for translation. Mihailo Pupin wrote highly of his work and philosophy. The title of one of Milovan Vitezović's poetry collections—Na času kod profesora Miloša N. Đurića—honours him.

His personal items and works are kept by the Belgrade University Library.

== Works ==
Original works

- Vidovdanska etika, 1914
- Smrt Majke Jugovića, 1918
- Filosofija panhumanizma, 1922
- Mit o sunčevoj sestri, 1925
- Pred slovenskim vidicima, 1928
- Racionalizam u savremenoj nemačkoj filosofiji, 1928
- Problemi filosofije kulture, 1929
- Ogledi iz grčke filosofije i umetnosti, 1936
- Etika i politika u Eshilovoj tragediji, 1937
- Aristotelovo etičko učenje, 1940
- Helenska agonistika i likovne umetnosti, 1940
- Istorija helenske književnosti u vremenu političke samostalnosti, 1951
- Sofisti i njihov istorijski značaj, sa bibl. dotadašnjih radova, 1955
- Kroz helensku istoriju, književnost i muziku (studije i ogledi), 1955
- Sofoklove tebanske tragedije, 1955
- Istorija starih Grka do smrti Aleksandra Makedonskog, 1955
- Na izvorima umetničke lepote, ogledi o Homeru, 1957
- Iz helenskih riznica (essays), 1959
- Aristotel, 1959
- Platonova akademija i njen politički rad, 1960
- Istorija helenske etike, 1961
- Patnja i mudrost, 1962
- Značenje izraza "radojički" u pesmi Do pojasa Laze Kostića, 1968
- Antologija stare helenske lirike, 1962
- Istorijski izvori istorija i filosofija, 1997
- Selected works, I-VI, 1997

Translator and editor

- Iliad, Homer
- Odyssey, Homer
- Poetics, Aristotle
- The Suppliant, Aeschylus
- The Persians, Aeschylus
- Seven Against Thebes, Aeschylus
- Prometheus Bound, Aeschylus
- Oresteia, Aeschylus
- Antigon, Sophocles
- Oedipus Rex, Sophocles
- Medea, Euripides
- Hippolytu, Euripides
- Iphigenia in Tauris, Euripides
- Daphnis and Chloe, Longus
- Symposium, Plato
- Ion, Plato
- Apology, Plato
- Phaedrus, Plato
- Phaedo, Plato
- Crito, Plato
- Criticism of Parallel Lives, Plutarch
- Enchiridion of Epictetus, Arrian
- De Vita Beata, Seneca the Younger
- Epistulae Morales ad Lucilium, Seneca the Younger
- Grčke tragedije, a compilation, 1982
- Various shorter works by Alfred Adler, Carl Jung, Maxim Gorky, Will Durant, Nikolai Berdyaev and Rabindranath Tagore
- Srpske narodne pesme, I-XIV, editor
- Srpske narodne pripovetke, I-II, editor
- Antologija stare helenske lirike, 1962, editor

== See also ==
- Milan Kujundžić Aberdar
- Jovan Došenović
- Vladimir Jovanović
- Božidar Knežević
- Svetozar Marković
- Dimitrije Matić
- Ljubomir Nedić
- Milan Budimir
- Emanuilo Janković
- Laza Kostić
- Branislav Petronijević
- Mita Rakić
