= Ljubomir Nedić =

Serbian philosopher (1858–1902)

- Љубомир Недић
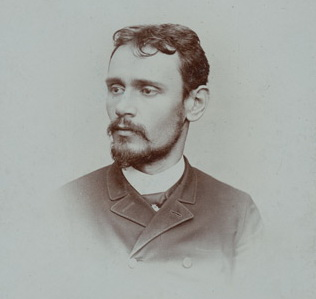
- Ljubomir Nedić circa 1890, portrait by Milan Jovanović
- Born: 25 April 1858; Belgrade, Principality of Serbia
- Died: 29 July 1902 (aged 44); Belgrade, Kingdom of Serbia

Education
- Education: University of Leipzig
- Thesis: Die Lehre von der Quantification des Prädikats in der neueren englischen Logik (The Doctrine Concerning the Quantification of the Predicate in Recent English Philosophy) (1885)
- Doctoral advisor: Wilhelm Wundt

Philosophical work
- Era: 20th-century philosophy
- Region: Western philosophy
- Institutions: Belgrade Higher School
- Main interests: Logic; Experimental psychology

Ljubomir Nedić (Serbian: Љубомир Недић; 25 April 1858 – 29 July 1902) was a Serbian philosopher and literary critic.

Having received academic training in philosophy at the University of Leipzig, Nedić taught at the Belgrade Higher School beginning in 1885, after having defended his doctorate thesis on Sir William Hamilton's logic. During the 1890s, Nedić left philosophy and began his career as a literary critic. His criticisms were controversial during his time and targeted many highly respected Serbian writers such as Jovan Jovanović Zmaj, Laza Kostić and Milan Milićević. Nedić advocated an interpretation of literary works with minimal attention to biographic and social circumstances in which they arose.

Despite his innovative and modern approach to Serbian literature, Nedić has been criticized for his lack of academic training in literary criticism, as well as his subjective and overly critical assessments of his political opponents, influenced by his staunch social conservative political views. His goal of clearing the path for a new generation of Serbian writers was carried out by Bogdan Popović soon after Nedić's death in 1902.

== Early life and education ==
Ljubomir Nedić was born in Belgrade on 25 April 1858. He finished his primary and secondary education in his hometown. As a young man, Nedić was interested in the natural sciences, translating several short works, as well as providing a translation of an account of the travels of James Cook from German. He enrolled in medical school in Germany in 1878. He later abandoned medicine for physiology and psychology, and finally graduated in philosophy at Leipzig University in 1882.

Nedić defended his doctoral thesis on contemporary British logic in 1885 at Leipzig University, primarily focusing on the logic of Sir William Hamilton. Having spent a year in London, he completed his doctorate titled Die Lehre von der Quantification des Prädikats in der neueren englischen Logik (The Doctrine Concerning the Quantification of the Predicate in Recent English Philosophy) under the mentorship of Wilhelm Wundt.

== Professorship ==
Soon after completing his doctorate, Nedić obtained a professorship at the Belgrade Velika škola, with the support of Minister of Education Alimpije Vasiljević. Nedić was first offered the position of substitute in 1884, becoming a full professor in 1886.

He taught history of philosophy based on the writings of George Henry Lewes, Eugen Dühring and Friedrich Ueberweg. Similarly to his predecessors Milan Kujundžić Aberdar and Alimpije Vasiljević, his course on logic was based on John Stuart Mill and A.W. Benn. According to Slobodan Žunjić, Nedić was not purely an ardent supporter of Sir William Hamilton's formal logic, as opposed to John Stuart Mill's inductive logic. His teachings at the Belgrade Higher School reflect a very balanced approach to the subject. He outlined both interpretations in his courses, from which notes were published in the late 1880s by his students. Also, according to Žunjić, he did not fully commit to either position, but he did at times describe his understanding of logic as broader than Hamilton's formal and "purely extensional" perspective.

During the late 1880s, Nedić would go on to publish a few works of popular philosophy such as O hipnotizmu (On Hypnotism), O snu i snovima (On Sleep and Dreams) in 1888 and O sofizmima (On Sophisms) in 1889. Losing interest in teaching philosophy, in some part because of his progressing illness, Nedić ventured more deeply into literary criticism and politics. This led to his dismissal from his teaching position at the subject of the history of philosophy, where he was succeeded by Mihailo Šljivić in 1889. Šljivić would take up Nedić's course on logic in 1895, after which Nedić lost his tenure in 1899.

== Literary criticism ==
In contrast to his contemporaries, the "natural criticism" of Svetislav Vulović inspired by Ludwig Börne and the utilitarian and political criticism of the early socialist Svetozar Marković, Nedić advocated a style of criticism of a work "in itself", devoid of biographical and political circumstances that led to its writing, focusing instead on style and a psychological analysis of the work. His stern belief in objective aesthetic norms, as well as his hard-line social and political conservatism, led to Nedić publishing a sharp critique of highly lauded Serbian writers, such as Jovan Jovanović Zmaj, Laza Kostić, Ljubomir Nenadović and Milan Milićević. His criticism was very controversial during his time, when evaluating the relatively young Serbian literary community with anything but the highest praise was taboo. In their stead, Nedić highly valued the lyricism of Vojislav Ilić. Initially, he praised Đura Jakšić, later condemning him for his solidarity with Svetozar Marković's socialist movement. During this time, Nedić was a member of the conservative Progressive Party.

In the 1890s, two groups emerged in Serbian literary criticism: one led by Nedić, and the other by the critics gathered around the literary journal Delo. Nedić served as editor of the periodical Srpski pregled (Serbian Review). The journal was politically conservative and was published during 1895. Beside his own journal, Nedić published several articles in the journals Red in 1894 and Zora from 1899 to 1901. In 1898, he translated the novel The Vicar of Wakefield into Serbian.

Nedić's largest works were his published books – Iz novije srpske lirike (A Selection from Recent Serbian Lyricism) in 1893, Noviji srpski pisci (Recent Serbian Writers) in 1901 and the posthumously published Kritičke studije I (Critical Studies Vol. 1) in 1910.

Jovan Skerlić applauded Nedić as a brave, intelligent and unrelenting critic who worked to tear down established norms and strived for a Serbian literature up to par with its European contemporaries. He criticized him for his rigid social traditionalism and political conservatism, his lack of academic training, and his departures from his own aesthetic norms against writers who were his political adversaries. According to Skerlić, Nedić's criticism was, in the end, highly destructive and cynical, at the same time inaugurating a new and more modern era in literary criticism in Serbia. Jovan Deretić was mostly in agreement with this view, and was particularly critical of Nedić's analysis of Zmaj, which he had claimed was particularly under the influence of the two's opposing political ideologies.

== Death and legacy ==
Nedić died in Belgrade on 29 July 1902.

His attempt at setting a new standard of Serbian literature was carried out during the following decades by a younger critic, Bogdan Popović.

== Bibliography ==
- O hipnotizmu (On Hypnotism), 1888.
- O snu i snovima (On Sleep and Dreams), 1888.
- O sofizmima (On Sophisms), 1889.
- Iz novije srpske lirike (A Selection from Recent Serbian Lyricism), 1893.
- Vekfildski sveštenik (The Vicar of Wakefield), 1898. (a translation)
- Noviji srpski pisci (Recent Serbian Writers), 1901.
- Kritičke studije I (Critical Studies Vol. 1), 1910.

== See also ==
- Petar II Petrović Njegoš
- Milan Kujundžić Aberdar
- Jovan Došenović
- Božidar Knežević
- Svetozar Marković
- Dimitrije Matić
- Konstantin Cukić

== Notes ==
=== References ===
- Ivić, Pavle (1995). "Twentieth century literature; by Novica Petković". The History of Serbian Culture. Middlesex: Porthill Publishers. ISBN 1-870732-31-6.
- Skerlić, Jovan (1967). Istorija nove srpske književnosti (in Serbian) (4th ed.). Belgrade: Prosveta.
- Žunjić, Slobodan (2014). Istorija srpske filozofije (in Serbian) (2nd ed.). Belgrade: Zavod za udžbenike. ISBN 978-86-17-18580-8.
- Krleža, Miroslav, ed. (1965). Enciklopedija Jugoslavije. 6, Maklj-Put (in Serbo-Croatian). Zagreb: Jugoslavenski leksikografski zavod.
