= Cabinet of Stevča Mihailović II =

- 29th Cabinet of Principality of Serbia
- 1876–1878
- Coat of arms of Principality of Serbia
- Date formed: 24th April, 1876
- Date dissolved: 1st October, 1878

People and organisations
- Head of state: Milan Obrenović IV
- Head of government: Stevča Mihailović

History
- Predecessor: Cabinet of Ljubomir Kaljević
- Successor: Cabinet of Jovan Ristić III

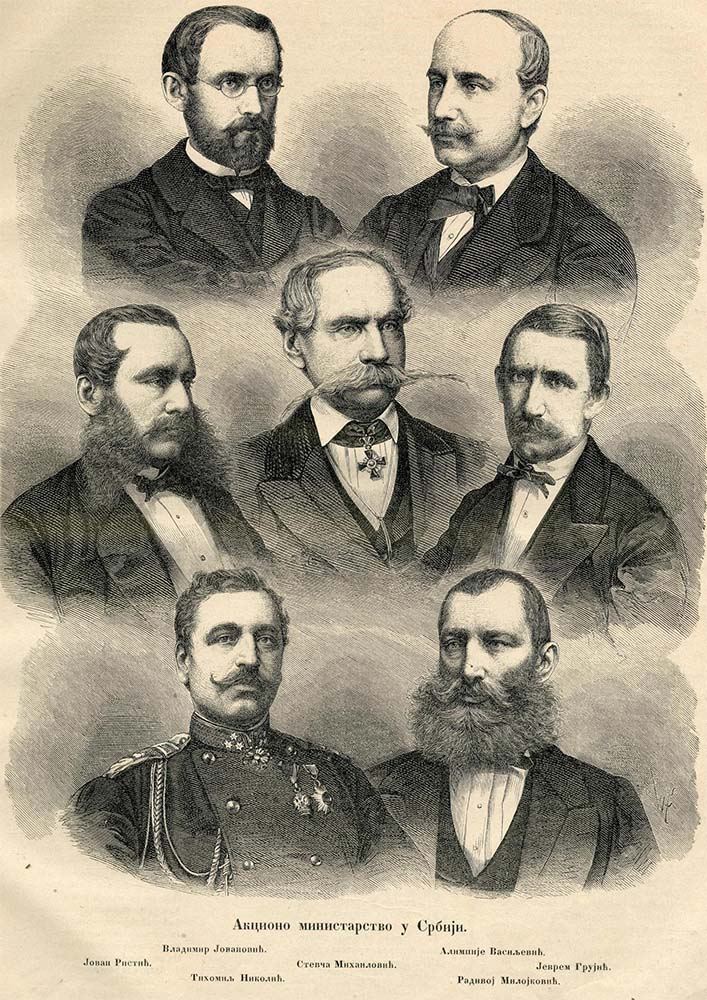
Cabinet Members in 1876

The Second Cabinet of Stevča Mihailović was a cabinet of the Principality of Serbia that was formed on 24th April, 1876, and dissolved on 1st October, 1878. This Cabinet saw some of the most decisive moments in the history of Modern Serbia, such as wars with the Ottoman Empire that finally led to the full independence of Serbia from the Ottomans. In 1876, Serbia attacked the Ottoman Empire with the intent of reconquering "Greater Serbia", this cabinet then beginning the First Balkan War in 1877 and the independence of Serbia in 1878. This was due to the Berlin Treaty being signed to end the war, and Serbia gaining its full internationally recognized independence and territorial expansion. Jovan Ristić, the Minister of Foreign Affairs, was Serbia's representative in Berlin.

== Cabinet members ==
| Position | Portfolio | Name | Image | In Office |
|---|---|---|---|---|
| Prime Minister | General Affairs | Stevča Mihailović | | May 6, 1876 – Oct 13, 1878 |
| Deputy Prime Minister | General Affairs | Jovan Ristić | | May 6, 1876 – Oct 13, 1878 |
| Minister | Foreign Affairs | Jovan Ristić | | May 6, 1876 – Oct 13, 1878 |
| Minister | Internal Affairs | Radivoje Milojković | | May 6, 1876 – Oct 13, 1878 |
| Minister | Justice | Jevrem Grujić | | May 6, 1876 – Oct 13, 1878 |
| Minister | Finance | Vladimir Jovanović | | May 6, 1876 – Oct 13, 1878 |
| Minister | Education and Church Affairs | Alimpije Vasiljević | | May 6, 1876 – Oct 13, 1878 |
| Minister | Army | Tihomilj Nikolić | | May 6, 1876 – Nov 16, 1876 |
| Minister | Army | Sava Grujić | | Nov 16, 1876 – Oct 13, 1878 |

== See also ==
- Principality of Serbia
- Stevča Mihailović
- Jovan Ristić
