= Milan Kujundžić Aberdar =

Serbian philosopher and politician (1842–1893)

- Милан Кујунџић Абердар

President of the National Assembly of Serbia
- In office 19 September 1885 – 23 September 1885
- Preceded by: Đorđe Pavlović
- Succeeded by: Đorđe Pavlović
- In office 6 May 1884 – 16 June 1884
- Preceded by: Sima Nestorović
- Succeeded by: Đorđe Pavlović
- In office 25 November 1882 – 31 December 1882
- Preceded by: Aleksa Popović
- Succeeded by: Sima Nestorović

Minister of Education
- In office 4 April 1886 – 13 June 1887
- Preceded by: Stevan D. Popović
- Succeeded by: Alimpije Vasiljević

Personal details
- Born: Janićije Kujundzić Aberdar; 1842 Belgrade, Principality of Serbia
- Died: 1893 (aged 50–51)
- Occupation: poet, philosopher and politician
- Known for: one the first 16 academicians of the Serbian Royal Academy

Milan Kujundžić Aberdar (Serbian Cyrillic: Милан Кујунџић Абердар; 1842–1893) was a Serbian poet, philosopher and politician.

== Biography ==
He was born in Belgrade and given the name Janićije but later he changed it to Milan. His pseudonym Aberdar came from his collected poems.

He studied at the gymnasium in Belgrade and Pančevo, and enrolled the legal faculty of the Belgrade Lyceum. With the Turkish bombardment of Belgrade in 1862, he stopped his studies and joined the Serbian army.

After that, he received a scholarship from the Serbian government to study philosophy in Vienna, Munich, Paris, and London. Before finishing his studies at Oxford, in 1866 he was back in Serbia, recalled by the Minister of Education, to take over the Department of Philosophy at the Velika škola.

He was a professor of philosophy at Belgrade's Velika škola, Secretary of the Serbian Learned Society (from 1873 to 1882), President of the National Assembly (from 1880 to 1885), Minister of Education (1886-1887), envoy of Rome, Youth Editor of Srbadije and poet.

King Milan Obrenović appointed him on 5 April 1887 the first 16 academicians of the Serbian Royal Academy, among them was Milan Kujundžić Aberdar.

He participated in the Serbian-Turkish wars of 1876–1878, and for that reason, he was promoted to Major, and later to Lieutenant-Colonel. Among the many decorations he received, the most significant are: the medal of the regeneration of the Serbian kingdom, the Order of the Cross of Takovo III degree, the Order of the White Eagle III degree, and the Order of the Cross of Takovo IV degree with swords.

== Works ==
- Kratki pregled harmonije u svetu (A Short Outline of the Harmonies in the World)
- Filozofija u Srba (Philosophy Among Serbs)
- Šta je i koliko u naš urađeno na lođici? (What and How Much Was Done in Logic in Our Country?)
- Ide li svet na bolje ili na gore? (Is the world going for better or for worse?)
- Filozofska i društveno-politička shvatanja (Philosophical and Sociopolitical Conceptions)

== See also ==
- Ljubomir Nedić
- Branislav Petronijević
- Ksenija Atanasijević
- Petar II Petrović Njegoš
- Jovan Došenović
- Božidar Knežević
- Svetozar Marković
- Dimitrije Matić
- Konstantin Cukić
