= Radenik =

Newspaper in Serbia

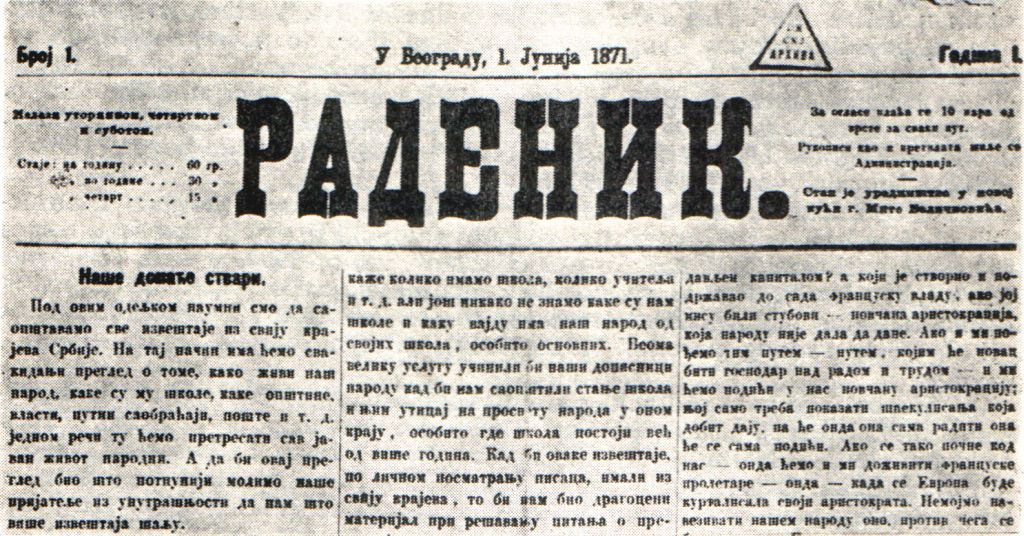
- First issue of Radenik, dated 1 June 1871
- Owner: Svetozar Marković
- Publisher: Đura Ljočić
- Editor: Đura Ljočić (until April 1872); Steva Milićević (April–May 1872)
- Founded: 29 April 1871
- Ceased publication: May 1872
- Political alignment: Socialism
- Language: Serbian
- Headquarters: Belgrade, Serbia
- Readership: 1,500 (according to a "socialist source")

Radenik (Serbian: Раденик, lit. 'The Worker') was a socialist newspaper that existed in the Principality of Serbia from April 1871 to May 1872. Founded by Svetozar Marković, its editor-in-chief was Đura Ljočić and later Steva Milićević. It was the first socialist newspaper in the Balkans and was published three times a week, mostly covering domestic politics. The newspaper published content about the First International, The Civil War in France, and often cited works by Karl Marx such as Das Kapital (the first volume) and The Communist Manifesto. Radenik supported free education and the unification of South Slavs, while being opposed to the Greater Serbia policy.

The newspaper was under constant threat from the authorities and became heavily censored in 1872, with Marković's associates occasionally beaten and jailed. This, alongside other allegations against Marković, forced Marković to illegally escape to Austria. The newspaper was banned in May 1872. Marković returned to Serbia in 1873 and launched the socialist Javnost newspaper.

== History ==
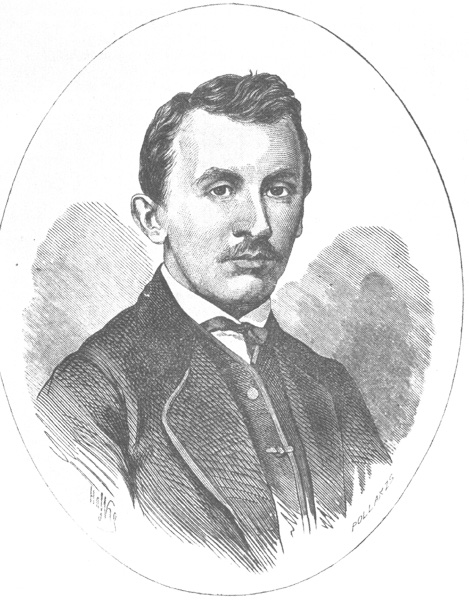
Svetozar Marković, the founder of Radenik

The sample issue of Radenik (English: The Worker) was released on 29 April 1871 (O.S. 17 April 1781), in which the newspaper's programme was published. The first issue was published on 13 June 1871 (O.S. 1 June 1781). Radenik was established by Svetozar Marković as the first socialist newspaper in the Principality of Serbia, as well as in the Balkans. Headquartered in Belgrade, Đura Ljočić was the newspaper's nominal editor, publisher, and financier, though Marković was the main contributor to the newspaper. The literary critic Jovan Skerlić described him as "the soul of the paper" (duša lista). Ljočić had previously been an associate of Marković, financially funding the socialist movement in Serbia. Contributing writers to the newspapers included Atanasije Vučković, Anta Aleksić, Nikola Pašić, Pavle Mihajlović, Mita Cenić, Jovan Alavantić, Đoka Mijatović, Jevrem Marković, Stevan D. Popović, Mihajlo Niketić, and Kosta Arsenijević. Radenik was published three times a week.

Radenik mostly wrote on domestic politics. Due to high censorship in the aftermath of the Paris Commune, which ended in May 1871 when authorities massacred about 20,000 participants, Radenik did not initially publish political programmes or manifestos, but rather content about daily life in Serbia from a socialist perspective. In the first issue, it published content about schools in the Studenica srez as well as the establishment of a society for business in Belgrade. Skerlić wrote that the newspaper appeared during the period where there were no progressive and opposition media in Serbia. Radenik was hailed by both youth and older liberals upset with the namesništvo (regency) of Milan I. In the second issue, it published articles defending socialism and communism. Additionally, in the first issues of Radenik, Marković criticised liberals and conservatives in Serbia. He also criticised the international and local press, such as the British The Times and Serbian Vidov Dan for their condemnation of the Paris Commune.

Marković became less involved with Radenik after August 1871, concentrating on writing the Serbia in the East book instead. Radenik did not publish articles about fiction, but instead cooperated with the literary magazine Vragolan, which had similar associates. Although the authorities could not ban Radenik because it was "within the bounds of legality", in late 1871 they banned Vragolan due to their satirical articles and arrested their editor-in-chief. Radenik also had connections with Lyuben Karavelov and his assistants, supporting his Svoboda newspaper. Radenik also had relations with the Der Volkswille newspaper. In December 1871, Radenik published an article in which it defended the Rakovica revolt. Radenik also became critical of Vladan Đorđević, a prominent physician who wanted to prosecute Radenik, accusing him later of being a "money-grabbing bourgeois".

In 1872, the newspaper changed its name to Radnik. By then, the newspaper had begun printing advertisements for businesses in the newspaper. For its entire existence, Radenik was in constant danger of being shut down by the authorities. Additionally, the newspaper became heavily censored by the authorities and Marković's supporters were occasionally beaten and jailed. There were allegations that Marković and his associates wanted to establish a commune near the Danube river and that Radnik supported the overthrow of the House of Obrenović and the return of the House of Karađorđević. Rumors were also spread that members of Marković's family had connections with Karađorđević's. This forced Marković to illegally escape Serbia and move to Austria. The authorities also ordered Marković to be arrested.

In April 1872, Steva Milićević succeeded Ljočić as the editor-in-chief; Radnik said that its editorial policy would not change. They continued to publish articles about the First International, a political federation of groups dedicated to working class issues. In the same month, Mijatović ended up publishing an article in which he referred to Jesus as a "socialist, communist, and revolutionary". Now under pressure from the authorities, Milićević had to apologise for this comment in Radenik's 137th and last issue, published on 17 May 1872. In the same month, the authorities officially banned Radnik, citing the publication's "treason" and "blasphemy". Mijatović joined Marković in exile. In 1873, Marković returned to Serbia and launched the socialist Javnost newspaper.

== Political stances ==
Radenik was a socialist, Marxist, and anti-establishment newspaper. At home, in communication it portrayed itself as reformist, while abroad it was revolutionary. Over time, it became more militantly socialist. Ljočić and several Radenik associates were members of the First International. Radenik published content about the First International and translated content from German socialist newspapers, particularly Der Volksstaat. Marković wrote articles about his personal support for the Paris Commune: The Death of the Paris Commune, The Commune and the International, and The White Terror, in mid-1871. In late June 1871, Marković received a copy of Marx's The Civil War in France, which he translated and published in Radenik. He also published Karl Marx's articles from the London-based The Daily News. Marx's works, such as Das Kapital and The Communist Manifesto were frequently cited. The newspaper published translations of two chapters of Das Kapital.

Marković presented Radenik as a newspaper that would fight "charlatans and terrorists", while also portraying Christianity as communist. Radenik supported equal rights for women and has lobbied for introducing a such law to the National Assembly of Serbia. It also opposed the construction of railways in Serbia, arguing that they were unnecessary in a country with agriculture. They supported the position of Ljubomir Kaljević, who argued that the construction of railways would benefit Serbia's enemies. Radenik was also opposed to Greater Serbia, a nationalist concept that sought the creation of an irredentist Serb state.

Radenik did not believe that Serbia had social divisions like in capitalist systems, arguing that "we have no wealth at all" (kod nas nema ni bogatstva uopšte). They supported improving education amongst workers, as well as creating capital that would be owned by cooperatives. They also supported compulsory free education, government transparency, and were opposed to the Ottoman Empire and Austria-Hungary. Radenik also supported the unification of South Slavs.

== Reception ==
The demand for Radenik was immediate. Just one week after its formation, the newspaper's publisher was not able to produce more copies of the first issue. The newspaper had the support of some army officers, while Pašić also added that the newspaper had the support of opposition liberals. Liberal newspapers such as the Pančevo-based Pančevac, Vršac-based Istok, and the youth-oriented newspaper Mlada Srbadija positively welcomed the Radenik newspaper. Although Radenik saw success, it was also criticised by the liberal government and reactionary newspapers, particularly the pro-government newspaper Ruža. The National Assembly of Serbia often condemned Marković and Radenik. At one point, in October 1871, several members of parliament (MPs) accused Radenik of being communistic and promoting "atheistic and immoral" views.

Skerlić noted that Radenik had over 1,500 subscribers at some point. The historian Woodford McClellan noted that this number came from a "socialist source". He wrote that this figure was impressive, considering that an average publisher printed about 600 to 800 copies of every issue. Besides Belgrade, Radenik was also read in other Serbian cities such as Smederevo, Šabac, Požarevac, Kragujevac, Negotin, and Užice.

== See also ==
- List of 19th-century newspapers in Serbia

== Sources ==
- Ersoy, Ahmet; Górny, Maciej; Kechriotis, Vangelis (2010). Modernism: The Creation of Nation-States. Central European University Press. ISBN 978-963-7326-61-5.
- Kisić, Milica; Bulatović, Branka (1996). Srpska štampa: 1768–1995.: istorijsko-bibliografski pregled. Štampa i srpsko društvo 19. i 20. veka [Serbian press: 1768–1995: historical-bibliographic review. The press and Serbian society in the 19th and 20th centuries] (in Serbian). Medija centar. ISBN 978-86-82827-01-6.
- McClellan, Woodford (2015) [1964]. Svetozar Markovic and the Origins of Balkan Socialism. Princeton University Press. ISBN 978-1-4008-7585-6.
- McClellan, Woodford D. (April 1966). "Serbia and Social Democracy, 1870–1878". International Review of Social History. 11 (1): 48–72. doi:10.1017/S0020859000003011.
- Radenić, Andrija (1977). Socijalistički listovi i časopisi u Srbiji (1871–1918) [Socialist newspapers and magazines in Serbia (1871–1918)] (in Serbo-Croatian). Rad.
- Skerlić, Jovan (1910). Svetozar Marković: Njegov život, rad i ideje [Svetozar Marković: His life, work and ideas] (in Serbian). Davidović.
