= Embassy of Serbia, London =

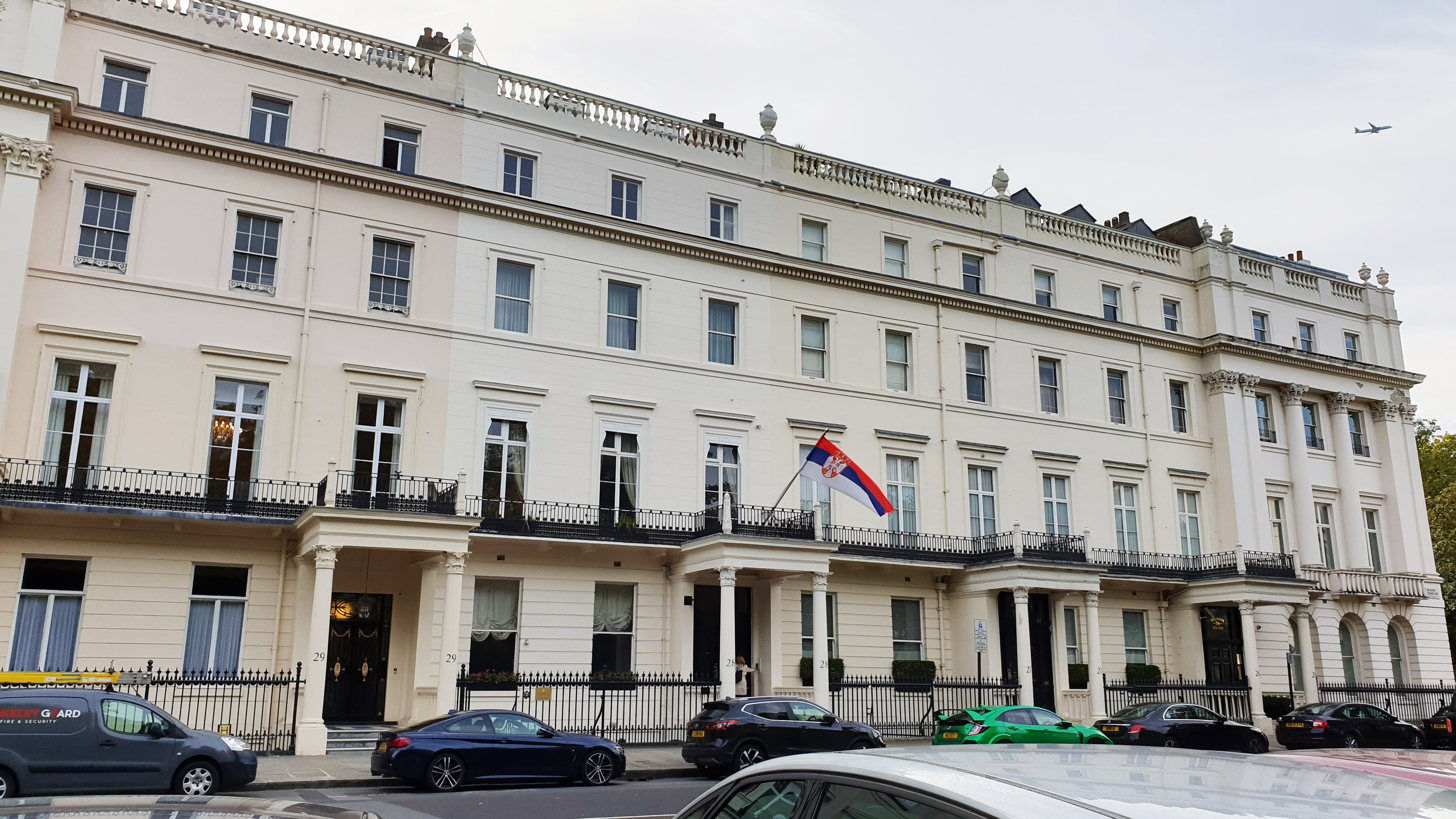
- Location: Belgravia
- Address: Belgrave Square, London, SW1
- Coordinates: 51.4984°N 0.1527°W
- Ambassador: Goran Aleksić

The Embassy of Serbia in London (Serbian: Амбасада Србије у Лондону) is the diplomatic mission of Serbia in the United Kingdom. The building is part of a single group of Grade I listed buildings at 25–36 Belgrave Square.

== Gallery ==
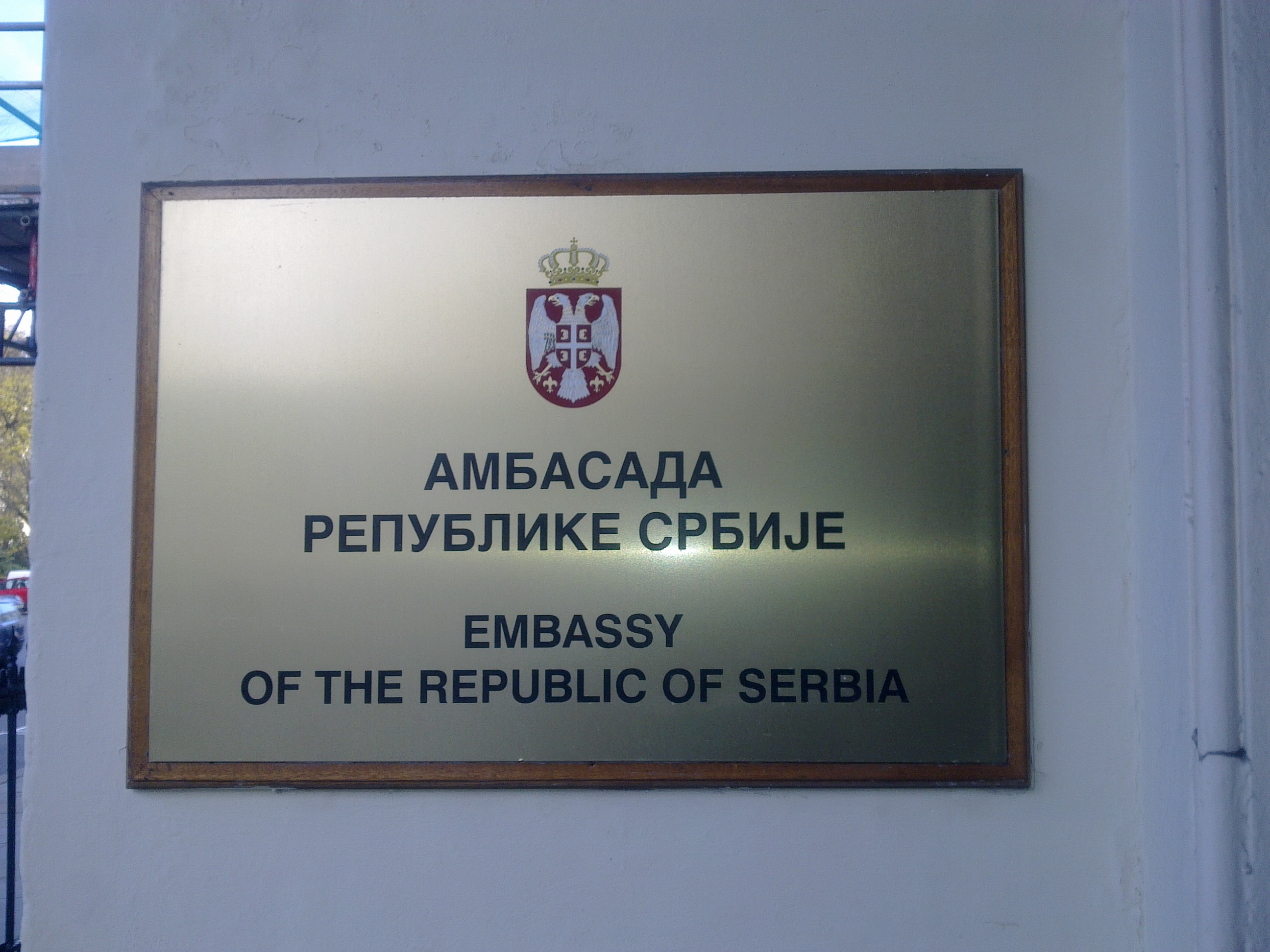
Plaque on the embassy building in English and Serbian

== See also ==
- List of ambassadors of Serbia to the United Kingdom
- Serbia–United Kingdom relations
- Foreign relations of Serbia
