= Vladimir Jovanović =

Vladimir Jovanović may refer to:

- Vladimir Jovanović (politician) (1833–1922), Serbian philosopher, political theorist, economist, politician, political writer
- Vladimir Jovanović (basketball) (born 1984), Serbian basketball coach (FMP, Cibona, Crvena zvezda, Igokea)
- Vlada Jovanović (born 1973), Serbian basketball coach (Partizan, Lokomotiv Kuban, Shenzhen Aviators, Mega Basket, Budućnost)
