= Đoka =

Đoka (Serbian Cyrillic: Ђока, also transliterated Djoka) is a Serbian nickname, a diminutive (and hypocorism) of Đorđe (George). The patronymics Đoković and Đokić are derived from the name. It may refer to:

- Đoka Mijatović (1848–78), Serbian socialist
- Đorđe Milovanović (1956–2009), Serbian footballer nicknamed Đoka bomba
- Đoka Bogdanović (1860–1914), Serbian film producer and cameraman that recorded the First Balkan War.
- Đoka Radulović, co-founder of Ikarbus
