= Kosta Magazinović =

Serbian politician and diplomat

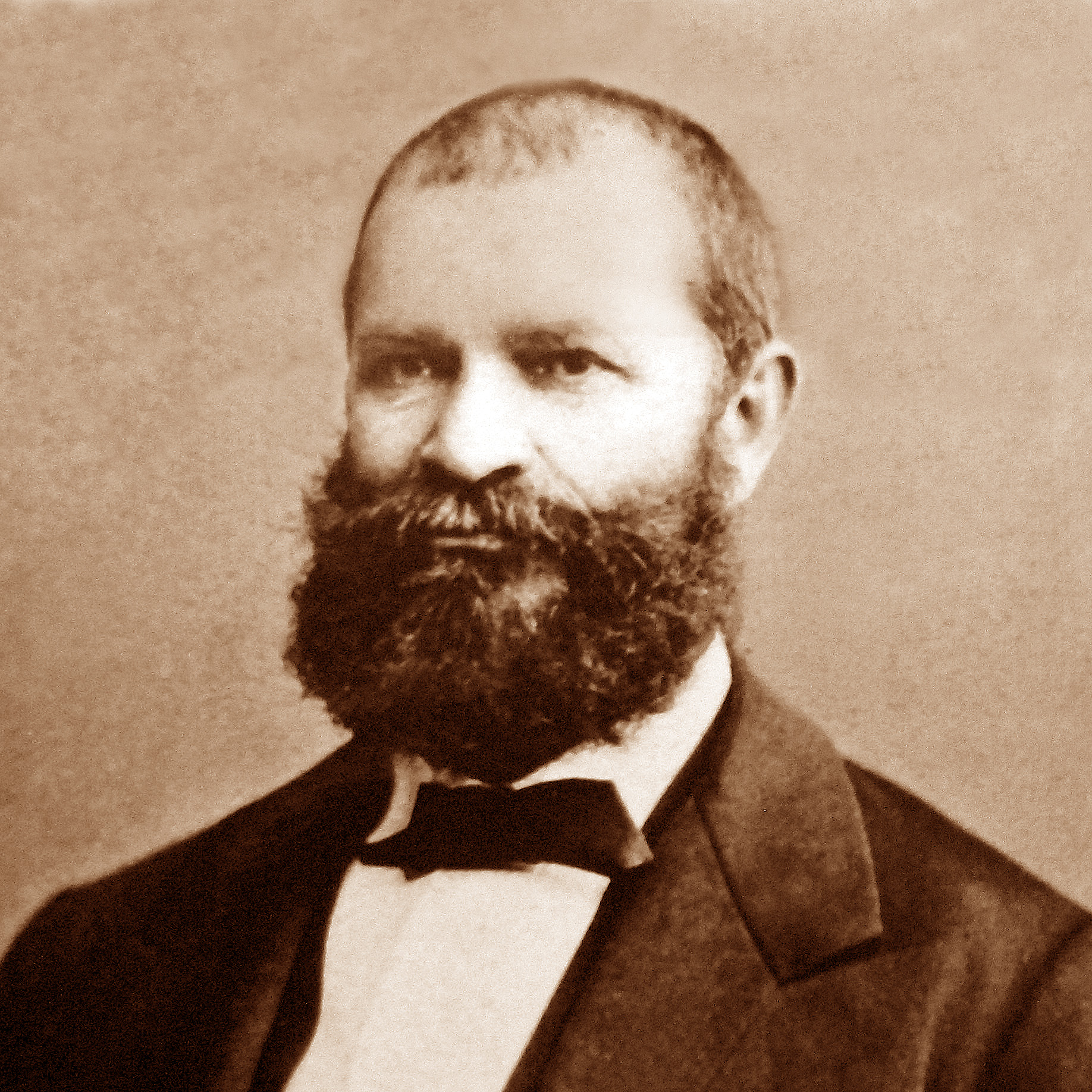
Konstantin "Kosta" Magazinović

Konstantin "Kosta" Magazinović (9 April 1819, Ruma, Habsburg monarchy – 16 September 1891, Belgrade, Kingdom of Serbia) was a Serbian politician and diplomat, known for establishing Romania-Serbia relations and being one of the founders of a gun foundry in Kragujevac that became Zastava Arms. He was one of the signatories of the Treaty of Bucharest on 20 January 1886. Kosta Magazinović was also the first diplomatic agent of the first Serbian diplomatic agency in Bucharest, which was officially established in February 1863. Magazinović and the U.S. consul at Bucharest, Ludwig J. Czapkay, tried to initiate U.S.-Serbian official contacts in 1867 when Ottoman troops withdrew from Serbia, but it was done to no avail.

In 1839, the first generation of learned Serbs born in Serbian lands (previously divided between the Habsburg Monarchy and the Ottoman Empire) were sent abroad for education on the state bursaries. This was done in order to train a 'local' bureaucratic and intellectual elite who had to substitute for the Serbs from Habsburg Vojvodina. Kosta Magazinović was among many chosen to study at the military academy in Vienna, but he arbitrarily went first to Imperial Russia, then to Leipzig to study philosophy, and finally to Paris where he enrolled into law school. There, he met other Serbian Parisians such as Milan Simić, Konstantin Cukić, Dimitrije Crnobarac, and Ljubomir Nenadović. Upon graduation, he returned to Serbia and joined the civil service. He wrote Memoari (Memoirs) where he tells the many experiences he had in his political and diplomatic career in Serbia and abroad during the 19th century.

He was elected as the regular member of Društvo srbske slovesnosti (Society Of Serbian Letters: the forerunner of the Serbian Royal Academy) on 1 August 1848.
