= Jovan Došenović =

Serbian philosopher and poet (1781–1813)

- Born: Jovan Došenović; 20 October 1781; Počitelj in Lika, Habsburg monarchy
- Died: 1813 (aged 31–32); Budim, Austrian Empire
- Other name: Atanasijev

Philosophical work
- Main interests: philosophy, poetry, translations, literary aesthetics

Jovan Došenović (Serbian Cyrillic: Јован Дошеновић, Hungarian: János Dosenovics; 1781–1813) was a Serbian philosopher, poet and translator, one of the first Serbian literary aestheticians.

== Biography ==
Jovan was the son of protoiereus Atanasije Došenović. He was born in Počitelj in Lika or Velika Pisanica. He studied at the University of Padua, where he got his Doctor of Philosophy and other academic degrees. He lived for a while in his birth home after returning to Lika, and then worked as a bookkeeper in Trieste, in a big shop owned by Dositej Obradović's friend Draga Teodorović, the wife of a wealthy Serbian merchant. He remained there until 1809 when he went to Pest to publish his anthology of writings, including poems and Čislenica or Nauka računa (lit. Science of Mathematics), Part I, and he was preparing to publish more. There he got sick but quickly recovered. After this event, the trail on Jovan is lost. However, it is known that in 1811 Došenović was still alive; in 1815 he was mentioned among deceased Serbian writers. Besides Italian language in which he studied, he was able to speak French and German. After finding some information on his work, Jernej Kopitar used to put Došenović's humble beginnings among best products of Serbian literature of that time, and in literary discussions (via letters sent to friends) he mentioned Došenović's name several times.

== Literary work and critical review ==
Jovan Došenović's poems can be divided by origin, subject, and form. In the first case, he used to translate more than to write on his own. His literary-historical significance is that he appears as the first person who was familiar with someone else's art and poetry and is the first person who started translating poems from other languages. Only this way Serbian readers of that time could get familiar with a variety of poetic forms, seeing that except natural poetry (which was common in renewed Serbian literature) there were other artistic poetry forms and that in fact, this was the most important of all. Došenović cited sources for his translated poems in the prefaces of his books, where he mentions Italians Iacopo Vittorelli and Giovanni Battista Casti, and Russian Mikhail Lomonosov. It was not vanity dictating him not to tell for a source for every single poem separately. He did not rely on this. The main ideal he was guided by was: is it possible to have different songs in Serbian too? That possibility he believed was completely true, so he tried to make everyone else see his printing. While translating his ideals, he did not want to show them to the Serbian publicity. In them he was trying to find only support column, choosing what he thinks is important for Serbian poetry literature by form and/or content. A subject he used to write about was love or depicting natural beauties; by the form they were anacreontics, sonnets and odes. In every Došenović's verse it can be seen how hands of poets are being tied and freedom of movement for a used language being cut. He wanted to write poems in the popular language spoken by an ordinary man; generally, he actually did write only in vernacular language. In order to reach a total clearance, he needed to do so much more so that it could be achieved successfully. Orthography was another factor that influenced him as his language was not "clear"; however, he strived to make it that way everywhere...

Beginnings of some more specific lyricism in modern Serbian literature is directly related to the poetic work of Došenović. He was the first one to come out with new forms of already mentioned anacreontics, sonnet and even more free odes; he was first to begin translating other eminent poets; he was first to show greater freedom and agility in poetic terms, too. All he did was using the famous collection with the preface of the Serbian literature in large-scale, speaking of aesthetics literature. Thus, the Došenović is one of the first Serbian literary aestheticians.

Došenović did not want to surrender to the way of writing poems in that time; he knew what had to be different; he saw that in other peoples, especially Italians; he wanted to make a Serbian poem really an ode poem; due to the latter, he gets into fights with anything that was slowing down artistic poetry: using form, language and orthography, and making some successes.

== Works ==
- Učastije radostei iz dolžnija ljubvi G. Mojsesu Miokovicu episk. Karlstadt od strani klira Lickago. Velencze, 1807.
- Čislenica ili nauka računa, Budim, 1809.
- Liriceska pjenija, Budim, 1809.
- Azbukoprotes, Budim, 1810.

== See also ==
- Serbian literature
- Božidar Knežević
- Vladimir Jovanović
- Svetozar Marković
- Dimitrije Matić
- Konstantin Cukić
- Milan Kujundžić
