= Jevrem Grujić =

Serbian lawyer, politician and diplomat

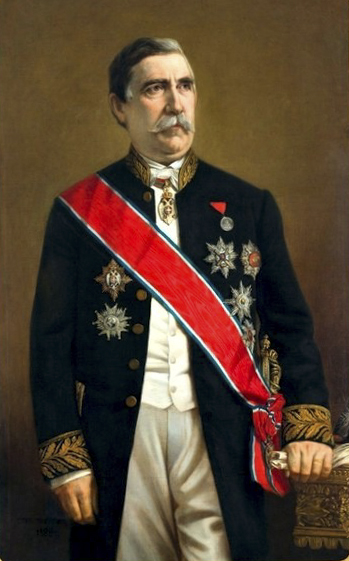

Minister of Internal Affairs Principality of Serbia
- In office 23 July 1859 – 4 August 1859
- Monarch: Miloš Obrenović
- Preceded by: Milivoje Jovanović
- Succeeded by: Vladislav Vujović

Minister of Justice
- In office 4 July 1859 – 4 August 1859
- Monarch: Miloš Obrenović
- Preceded by: Jovan Filipović
- Succeeded by: Matija Simic

Minister of Justice
- In office 1860–1861
- Monarch: Mihailo Obrenović
- Preceded by: Jevrem Grujić
- Succeeded by: Djordje D. Cenić

Minister of Internal Affairs
- In office 31 August 1875 – 8 October 1875
- Monarch: Milan Obrenović
- Preceded by: Danilo Stefanović
- Succeeded by: Ljubomir Kaljević

Minister of Justice Principality of Serbia
- In office 24 April 1876 – 13 October 1878
- Monarch: Milan Obrenović
- Preceded by: Stojan Marković
- Succeeded by: Dimitrije Matić

Personal details
- Born: 8 November 1827 Darosava, Principality of Serbia
- Died: September 15, 1895 (aged 67) Belgrade, Kingdom of Serbia
- Spouse: Jelena Grujić
- Children: Slavko Grujić; Mirka Grujić
- Relatives: Mabel Grujić (daughter-in-law)
- Education: Licej Kneževine Srbije; Sorbonne Law School; University of Heideberg
- Occupation: lawyer, politician, diplomat
- Awards: Order of the White Eagle; Order of the Cross of Takovo

Jevrem Grujić (Serbian Cyrillic: Јеврем Грујић; November 8, 1827 – September 15, 1895) was a Serbian lawyer, politician and diplomat in the mid to late 19th century. Grujić was active at the highest levels of Serbian politics, contributing to the creation of new laws and a member of multiple cabinets. As a prominent ideologue of Serbian liberalism and member of the Academy of Sciences and Arts, he was frequently in conflict with the absolutist regime of Prince Mihailo Obrenović. Imprisoned a number of times during his career, popular support resulted in Grujić's release.

== Early life and postgraduate studies ==
Jevrem Grujić was born on 23 July 1826 in the village of Darosava near Arandjelovac in a patriarchal peasant family. His father was a merchant and high ranking state official. His ancestors, originally from Montenegro, had moved to Serbia in the 17th century and founded a village of the same name. The founder of the Grujić family, Grujića Šestanović, was a participant in both Serbian insurrections and a deputy to the popular assembly that met during the first reign of Prince Miloš Obrenović. Following his graduation from the Gymnasium Grujić enrolled in the Lyceum in Belgrade in 1846.

In 1847 Jevrem Grujić with other Lyceum students founded the Society of Serbian Youth (Družina mladeži srpske), which was inspired by the Burschenschaften. (Note: “Družina mladeži srpske” was the only organisation of Serbian students within Serbia. Serbian students in the Habsburg monarchy founded organisations that cooperated among themselves, but their unification was prevented by the Revolution of 1848 and the conservative reaction that followed.) In "Neven sloge", the almanac of Družina, Jevrem Grujić published an article titled: “Horizon of the State” (Obzor države). The article then became the statement of Serbian liberalism that Grujic's generation would eventually accept and adopt.

Grujić pointed out that the role of a country was to provide the people with happiness and wellbeing. He criticised the church, praised schools and education, expressed his faith in progress, and scorned the current atmosphere in Serbia. For him Serbs did not have outer or inner freedom since Serbia was still a vassal of the Ottoman Empire moreover it was deprived of any type of constitutional rights. The goals of his platform was the liberation of the Serbian people from foreign government, and the improvement of relations with other Slavs. Jevrem Grujić finished his text with the exclamation: “Long live an independent, legal, and in time, free state of Serbia.

In 1849 he was granted a government scholarship and proceeded to study law at two prestigious European universities: Heideberg and the Sorbonne. (Note: Jevrem Grujić belonged to that first generation of learned Serbs born in Serbia but sent abroad for education on state bursaries in order to train a ‘local’ bureaucratic and intellectual elite) In 1850 he moved to Paris to continue his studies, in France he published a book, Slaves du Sud, that so enraged the Serbian authorities that they cancelled his stipend. He finished law school in 1854 and returned to Belgrade. He was one of the young liberal "Parisians" as were called those who had studied in France and were influenced by political doctrines of French provenance. In 1858, with Ranko Alimpić, Jovan Ilić, and others liberal students of the lyceum, Grujić organized a "Liberal Club" where they advocated for national liberation and independence, freedom of the press, religion and education and professed the goal of modernising the Serb State economically and politically. Grujić joined the civil service, quickly progressing through the ranks.

== Political career ==
Jevrem Grujić was a central figure of the St Andrew's Day Assembly (Svetoandrejska skupština) held in 1858 which later overthrew Prince Alexander Karađorđević. This marked his entry into politics and later on he was instrumental in passing Serbia's first law on the Assembly.

A founding member of the Liberal Party he served as its leader from 1868 to 1878. He served as minister in several Serbian governments and as head of Serbia's diplomatic missions in Constantinople, London and Paris. His outspoken liberalism, however, brought him harassment and also imprisonment.

During the so-called "demise of the High Court", (Note: The Prince and the Council had established a special court purely for trying judges of the High Court; that special court did not have to rely on producing evidence but was allowed to pronounce its judgment according to the free conviction of its judges. The whole procedure was so contrived that Jevrem Grujić refused to recognize the legality of the proceedings and stood mute.) he was one of the five High Court judges (along with Jovan Filipović, Jovan Mičić, Marinko Radovanović, and Jovan Nikolić) who were sentenced to three years in prison and two years of deprivation of civil rights for discharging those associated with the Majstorović conspiracy. He was arrested at the beginning of July 1864 and released at the beginning of September 1865 after one year spent in the Karanovac prison, when Prince Mihailo Obrenović, under the strong pressure of the public opinion, pardoned him.

In 1876 Grujić became Minister of Justice in the Second Government of Stevča Mihailović.

In 1877, he was presented with the highest honour of his time, the Order of the Cross of Takovo 1st Class, and in 1892, towards the end of his diplomatic and political career, with the Order of the White Eagle 2nd Class while he was Serbian ambassador in Paris.

Jevrem Grujić died in Belgrade in 1895, His memoirs were published in three volumes by the Royal Serbian Academy in 1922–23.

== Family and legacy ==
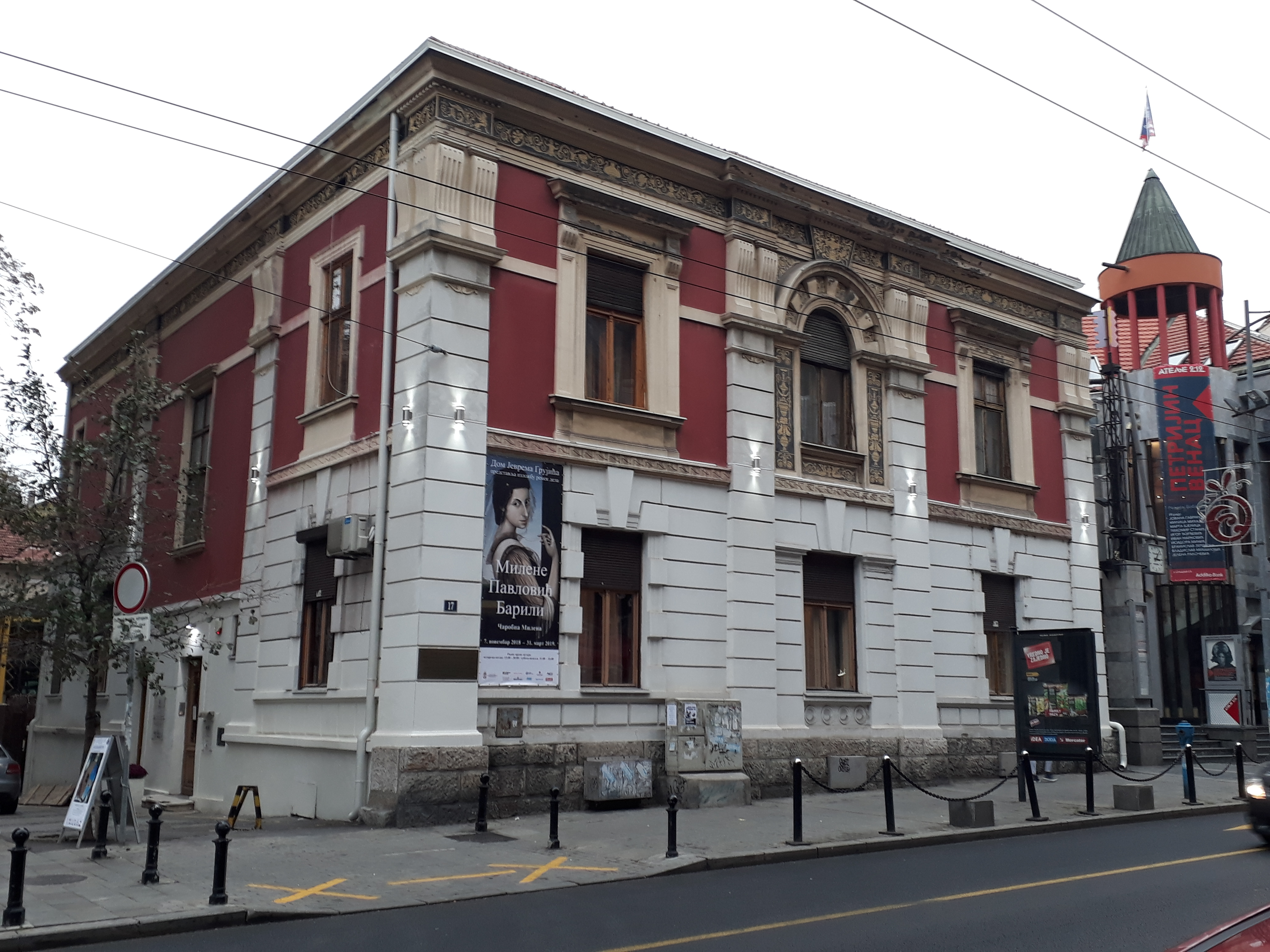
Jevrem Grujić's house, a Serbian Historic-Cultural Monument, located at 17 Svetogorska in Belgrade

Jevrem and his wife Jelena had a son Slavko and daughters Miroslava - Mirka and Stana. Dr Slavko Grujić received his doctorate at the Sorbonne in Paris, was Serbian Undersecretary for Foreign Affairs then a diplomat in Athens, Petrograd, ambassador in Washington and London where he died. He was married to American Mable Dunlop Grujić. She raised money and helped set up several aid funds for the Serbian soldiers fighting on the Salonika front. It was through the effort of Slavko and Mabel Grujić that the Belgrade University Library “Svetozar Marković” was built when Carnegie Endowment for International Peace agreed to approve a $100,000 gift to the Serbian government to build a "Carnegie library" in Belgrade.

Stana married Stevan Ćurčić and had daughters Jelena and Milica. Jelena married diplomat Milan Milojević and had daughters Milica and Milena. Milica married Vukašin Šećerović and had sons Milan and Lazar, and Milena married Milivoje Naumović, son of Mihailo Naumović.

For its cultural, historical, architectural and townscape value, Jevrem Grujić's House, a single-story family villa, built-in neo-Renaissance style in 1896, was designated a cultural property in 1961, and a cultural property of great importance to the Republic of Serbia in 1979. (Note: Since the house had not been confiscated by the communist regime, its original legacy has been kept intact, over the past two centuries.)

== Published works ==
- Slaves du Sud ou le peuple Serbe avec les Croates et les Bulgares (1853)
- Uspomene (Memories) (1864)
- Zapisi (Writings) 3 vols., (1922–1923)

== Notes ==
Government offices
| Preceded by Jovan Filipović | Minister of Justice of Serbia; 1859 | Succeeded by Matija Simić |
| Preceded by Himself | Minister of Justice of Serbia; 1860–1861 | Succeeded by Đorđe D. Cenić |
| Preceded by Stojan Marković | Minister of Justice of Serbia; 1876–1878 | Succeeded by Dimitrije Matić |
| Preceded by Milivoje Jovanović | Minister of Internal Affairs; 1859 | Succeeded by Vladislav Vujović |
| Preceded by Danilo Stefanović | Minister of Internal Affairs; 1875 | Succeeded by Ljubomir Kaljević |
Diplomatic posts
| Preceded by Čedomilj Mijatović | Serbian Ambassador Extraordinary and Plenipotentiary to the United Kingdom; 1887–1889 | Succeeded by Čedomilj Mijatović |
