= List of 19th-century newspapers in Serbia =

Newspapers were introduced in Serbia in 1834.

== List ==
List of 19th-century newspapers in Serbia
Name	Editor(s)	Location	Existence	Notes	Ref.
Novine srbske	Dimitrije Davidović (founding editor, 1834–1835); Various (after 1835) (Note: Dimitrije Isailović (1835–1840); Vladislav Stojadinović (1840–1844); Miloš Popović (1844–1855); Jovan Ristić (1855–1860); Milan Đ. Milićević and Stojan Bošković (1860–1890); Stevan Đurić and Milovan Ć. Glišić (1890–1892); Đura Vuković (1892–1893); Milovan Ć. Glišić (1893–1894); M. Đorđević-Prizrenac (1894–1896); Todor Popović (1896); Dimitrije Popović (1896–1898); Jovan Bademlijić (1898–1900); D. T. Mijušković, Jovan Bademlijić, Dimitrije S. Jovanović, and Ljubomir Miljković (1900); Luka Lazarević (1900–1901); Jovan Đ. Dokić (1901–1902); Milan Biljčević (1902–1903); Milenko Marković (1903–1909); Gvozden Klajić (1909–1910); Milenko Marković (1910); Živojin O. Dačić (1910–1912); Vojislav Grujić and Lazar Knežević (1912); Živojin O. Dačić (1912–1913); R. J. Odavić (1913–1914); Milan Banić (1914); Vladimir T. Spasojević (1914–1916); Slavoljub Panić (1916–1917); Dimitrije Stevanović (1917–1919); Petar Grebenac (1919).)	Kragujevac; Belgrade (after 1835)	1834–1919	Published once a week (on Saturday); twice a week (1843); three times a week (1850); every day (1914); published every Tuesday, Thursday, and Saturday (1916)	
Dodatak ka Srbskim novinama	Vladislav Stojadinović Čikoš (1840–1842), Pavle Popović (1841–1842)	Belgrade	1840–1842	Published weekly	
Podunavka	Miloš Popović	Belgrade	1843–1848	Published every Saturday	
Srbski ulak (Serbischer Courrier)	Maksim Simonović	Belgrade	1843–1844	Published weekly	
Branislav	Paja Čavlović	Belgrade	1844–1845		
Novine čitališta Beogradskog	Pavle Arsenije Popović	Belgrade	1847–1849	Published weekly on Friday	
Čiča Srećkov list za Srbske zemladalce	Atanasije Nikolić	Belgrade	1847–1848		
Državo-narodni pratioc	Sergije Nikolić	Belgrade	1848–1851	Published weekly	
Prosvetne novine sa državo-narodnim pratiocem	Sergije Nikolić	Belgrade	1848–1849	Published weekly, on Thursday	
Šaljivac	Sergije Nikolić	Belgrade	1850–1851	Published weekly	
Šumadinka	Ljubomir P. Nenadović, Milorad Medaković (briefly)	Belgrade	1850–1857	Published every Thursday; after 1850 every Tuesday and Friday; after 1856 every Tuesday, Thursday, and Saturday; after 1857 every Saturday	
Budilnik narodne prosvete	Sergije Nikolić	Belgrade	1851		
Zvanične novine Knjažestva Srbije		Belgrade	1856–1860	Initially published weekly every Thursday; later published three times a week	
Đački venac	Pupils of the Belgrade Gymnasium	Belgrade	1858	Published weekly	
Za Srbinstvo	Pupils of the Belgrade Gymnasium	Belgrade	1858		
Ocenitelj	Pupils of the Belgrade Gymnasium	Belgrade	1858		
Rodoljubac	Đorđe Maletić, Vladimir Vuić	Belgrade	1858	Published every Wednesday	
Sloga	Pupils of the Belgrade Gymnasium	Belgrade	1858		
Vidov dan	Miloš Popović	Belgrade	1861–1876	Published three times a week: on Tuesday, Thursday, and Saturday; after 1868 published every day except Sunday	
Zimzelen	Aleksandar Andrić	Belgrade	1861–1862		
Trgovačke novine	Milan Milovuk	Belgrade	1861–1863	Published every Saturday	
Srbska narodnost	Stevan Kaćanski	Belgrade	1862–1863	Published twice a week; after 1863 published three times a week	
Vojin	Jovan Dragašević	Belgrade	1864–1870	Published monthly; after 1867, published three times a month	
Vila	Stojan Novaković	Belgrade	1865–1868	Published every week; in 1868 it was published on every 5, 15, and 25 day in the month	
Ruža	Mijailo Đ. Ćelešević	Belgrade	1865–1872	Published every week	
Beogradske ilustrovane novine	Milan Milovuk	Belgrade	1866	Published on every 1 and 16 date in the month	
Ilustrovani svet	Milan Milovuk	Belgrade	1867	Published twice a year, in March and September	
Mir	Editors of Svetovid	Belgrade	1867		
Srbija	Ljubomir Kaljević	Belgrade	1867–1871	Published weekly, after 1868 published three times a week	
Bokor	Gaja Matić	Belgrade	1868		
Zadruga	Editors of Srbija	Belgrade	1868	Published twice a month	
Jedinstvno	Stojan Bošković	Belgrade	1868–1873	Published four times a week, except Mondays	
Pastir	Nikola Popović	Belgrade	1868–1870	Published weekly	
Škola	Milan Đ. Milićević	Belgrade	1868–1876	Published three times a month	
Zora	Todor Pavlović	Belgrade	1869	Published five times a month	
Pravda'	D. Novaković, Stojan Antić, Uroš Knežević	Belgrade	1870	Published three times a month	
Sudski list	Đorđe R. Pantelić	Belgrade	1869	Published three times a month	
Težak	Milan Milovuk	Belgrade	1869–1914; 1919–1941	Published twice a month. After that, it was published weekly, once a month, and three times a month.	
Govornica	Stojan Živković	Belgrade	1870	Published weekly, on Saturday	
Srbska pčela	M. Jov. Đorđević	Belgrade	1870	Published on every 5, 15, and 25 day in the month	
Vragolan	Mijajlo J. Niketić	Belgrade	1871–1872	Published four times a month	
Jugoslovenska zvezda	M. J. Đorđević	Belgrade	1871		
Pravoslavlje	Nikodim Petrović	Belgrade	1871–1873	Published monthly	
Radenik	Đura Ljotić, Steva Milićević	Belgrade	1871–1872	Published three times a week	
Rešeto	Ljubomir Danilović	Belgrade	1871	Published every 10 days	
Trgovački glasnik	Čedomilj P. Marinković	Belgrade	1871	Published weekly	
Beogradski brzojavnik	Petar Josimović	Belgrade	1872	Published every day	
Vrzino kolo	Petar J. Perinović	Belgrade	1874	Initially published four times a month, later three times a month	
Ujedinjenje	Mijajlo J. Niketić	Belgrade	1872	Published three times a week (on Wednesday, Friday, and Sunday)	
Branik	Stevan Kaćanski	Belgrade	1873–1875	Published three times a week (on Wednesday, Friday, and Sunday)	
Budućnost	Uroš Knežević	Belgrade	1873–1875	Published three times a week	
Javnost	Dimitrije Jov. Stojković	Kragujevac	1873–1874	Published three times a week (on Wednesday, Friday, and Sunday)	
Preodnica	Petar Perinović	Belgrade	1873–1874	Published three times a month (on 5, 15, and 25 days of the month)	
Selo	Aksentije Mijatović	Belgrade	1873	Published weekly	
Strašni sud	M. J. Danojlović	Belgrade	1873	Published three times a month	
Beogradske novine	Dimitrije M. Nikolić	Belgrade	1874–1875	Published three times a week (on Wednesday, Friday, and Sunday)	
Vreme	Mita Rakić	Belgrade	1874	Published every day, except Monday	
Glas javnosti	Steva Milićević	Kragujevac	1874	Published twice a week (on Wednesday and Saturday)	
Domišljan	Nikola Nikšić	Belgrade	1874–1875	Published three times a month (on 1, 10, and 20 days in the month)	
Korespodencija	Dimitrije M. Nikolić	Belgrade	1874	Published three times a week	
Narodne novine	Jovan Balaitski	Belgrade	1874	Published three times a week (on Tuesday, Thursday, and Saturday)	
Novo doba	Srećko Aleksić	Belgrade	1874	Published twice a week	
Rad	Pera Todorović	Belgrade	1874–1875	Published four times a month	
Seljak	unknown	Požarevac	1874		
Sion	Arhimandrit Nestor Popović	Belgrade	1874–1875	Published once a week (in 1875 it was published monthly)	
Srpski arhiv za celokupno lekarstvo	Vladan Đorđević	Belgrade	1874	Published once a year	
Braničevo	Svetislav V. Minić	Požarevac	1875	Published twice a week (on Thursday and Sunday)	
Zbor	Lazar Komarčić	Kragujevac	1875	Published three times a week (on Tuesday, Thursday, and Saturday)	
Kob	M. A. Ristić	Belgrade	1875	Published weekly	
Nada	Atanasije Anđelopolić	Belgrade	1875	Published every Thursday	
Narodna volja	Milan Pešić	Smederevo	1875–1876	Published weekly	

== Sources ==
- Arnautović, Aleksandar (1912). Štamparije u Srbiji u XIX veku [Print in Serbia in the 19th-century] (PDF) (in Serbian). Državna štamparija Kraljevine Srbije.
- Bogosavljev, Sofija (15 December 2021). "Duboki koreni srpskog i beogradskog novinarstva" [The deep roots of Serbian and Belgrade journalism]. Udruženje novinara Srbije (in Serbian).
- Janković, Dragana (27 December 2021). "Pregled beogradske štampe od 1850. do 1945. godine kroz 25 listova" [Review of the Belgrade press from 1850 to 1945 through 25 papers]. Udruženje novinara Srbije (in Serbian).
- Kisić, Milica; Bulatović, Branka (1996). Srpska štampa: 1768–1995.: istorijsko-bibliografski pregled. Štampa i srpsko društvo 19. i 20. veka [Serbian press: 1768–1995: historical-bibliographic review. The press and Serbian society in the 19th and 20th centuries] (in Serbian). Medija centar. ISBN 978-86-82827-01-6.
- Radojković, Tamara (22 December 2021). "Počeci beogradske satirične štampe" [The beginnings of the Belgrade satirical press]. Udruženje novinara Srbije (in Serbian).
- Radojković, Tamara (23 December 2021). "Čiča Srećkov i drugi listovi za srpsku "poljsku privredu"" [Čiča Srećkov and other papers for the Serbian "agricultural economy"]. Udruženje novinara Srbije (in Serbian).
- Radojković, Tamara (28 December 2021). "Najpoznatija glasila političkih stranaka 19. veka u Srbiji" [The most famous political party newspapers of the 19th century in Serbia]. Udruženje novinara Srbije (in Serbian).
- Skerlić, Jovan (1911). Istorijski pregled srpske štampe 1791-1911 [Historical review of the Serbian press 1791-1911] (in Serbian). Srpsko novinarsko udruženje.
- Škoro, Srđan; Radojković, Tamara (24 December 2021). "Bogata tradicija cenzure u beogradskoj i srpskoj štampi" [A rich tradition of censorship in the Belgrade and Serbian press]. Udruženje novinara Srbije (in Serbian).
