= Konstantin Cukić =

Serbian economist and politician (1826–1879)

Konstantin "Kosta" Cukić (Serbian Cyrillic: Константин Коста Цукић; 1826 – 1879) was an economist and minister of finance and education in the government of Prince Mihailo Obrenović. At the end of the nineteenth century, he was one of several men who stood out in Serbia in economic thought, alongside Kosta Cukić, Dimitrije Matić, Čedomilj Mijatović, and Mihailo V. Vujić. In philosophy, Cukić was a Kantian in influence.

== Biography ==
Konstantin Lazarević Cukić was born in Karanovac (Kraljevo) on 13 April 1826, according to the old Julian Calendar. His father, Petar Lazarević, was the son-in-law of the Duke of the First Serbian Uprising, Pavle Cukić, a member of the Assembly, the highest legislative and governing body in Serbia. Mother Ana was the daughter of Petar Nikolajević Moler, the hero of the First Serbian Uprising.

He completed elementary school in Kraljevo and Kruševac and lower grammar school in Kragujevac. He went to Vienna in 1838/39 and initially studied languages and privately graduated from gymnasium. He began his studies in state sciences, the central part of which, according to the cameralistic concept, was represented by economics. He then moved to Heidelberg and completed his "philosophical and sociopolitical sciences" with Professor Karl Heinrich Rau and earned his Ph.D. He was a member of the first group of Serbian students who went on to study abroad on state bursaries that consisted of Kosta Magazinović, Dimitrije Matić, Konstantin Nikolajević, Filip Hristić, Djordje Cenić and Dimitrije Crnobarac. In Heidelberg, he became familiar with the theories of most philosophers and economists of the eighteenth- and nineteenth-century. He managed to complete his three-volume work entitled "State Economics" where he mentioned the works of the following philosopher-economists: Adam Smith, Léon Say, John Ramsay McCulloch, Hermann Lotze, Antoine Gustave Droz, Pellegrino Rossi, Louis Auguste Blanqui, Nicolas François Canard, Yves Guyot, and others.

After completing his studies, Cukić returned to Serbia in the spring of 1848 and received the professorship at the Belgrade Lyceum of the Principality of Serbia, where he taught Political Economy, Finance, Trade Science and Economic Policy. He immediately became involved in the work of the Serbian Society Of Letters and became its secretary.

Since there was no economic textbooks or any similar books written by a Serb at that time (most were translations from German, French, Russian, English, Italian and other economists), Cukić went to work and soon published the first part of his textbook, State Economics, entitled Narodna ekonomija (1851). This was followed by the third part, titled "Finance" (1853), while the second part, "Economic Policy", was published only ten years later (1862) when Cukić was already Minister of Finance.

== See also ==
- Jovan Došenović
- Vladimir Jovanović
- Božidar Knežević
- Dimitrije Matić
- Milan Kujundžić Aberdar
- Petar II Petrović Njegoš
