= Đoka Mijatović =

- Ђока Мијатовић
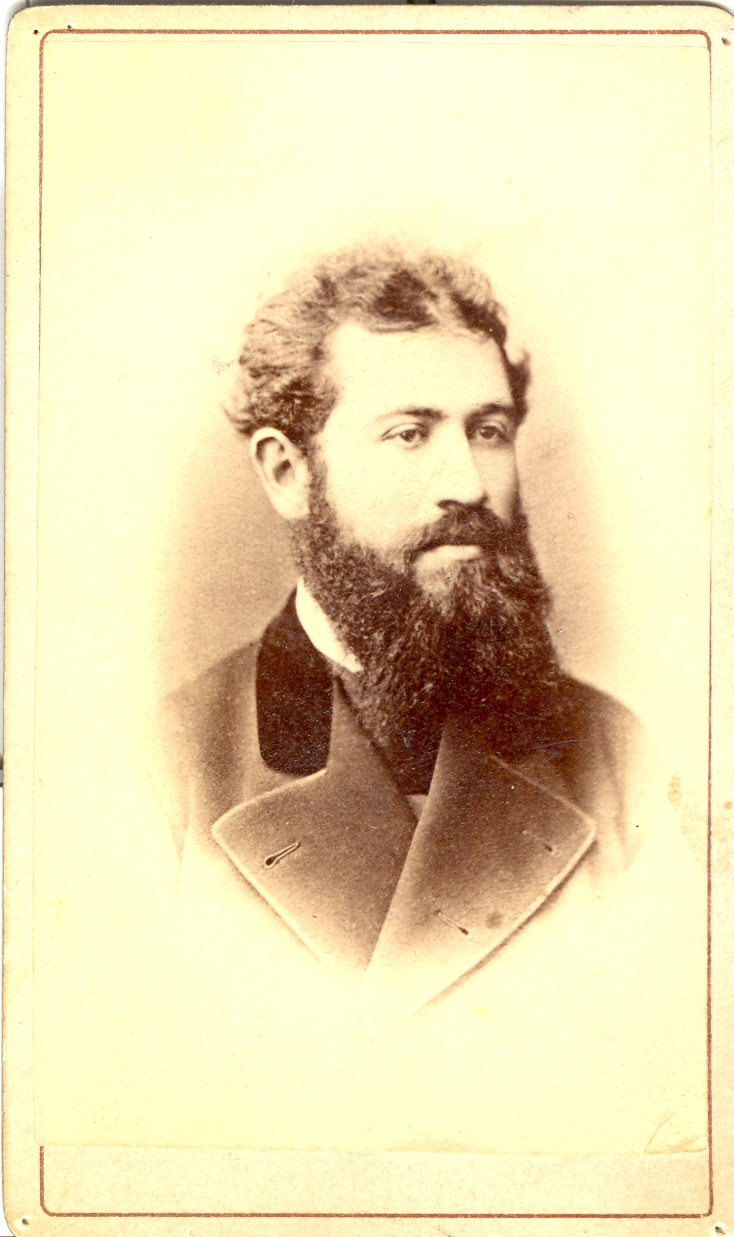
- Born: 1848; Novi Sad, Austrian Empire
- Died: 1878 (aged 29–30); Novi Sad, Austria-Hungary
- Political party: United Serb Youth

Đoka Mijatović (Serbian Cyrillic: Ђока Мијатовић; 1848–1878) was a Serbian socialist, one of the first major socialist figures among Svetozar Marković, Branko Mihajlović, Vasa Pelagić, Dragiša Stanojević, and others, that were important in disseminating socialist ideas in the Balkans. Born in Novi Sad into an affluent family, Mijatović studied in Zurich to become a doctor in medicine but became a lawyer by profession. He joined the United Serb Youth (1866–72), and was part of the organization's left wing, supporting Svetozar Marković's ideas. He became the editor of Jednakost, a socialist newspaper based on the Radenik. He died at 30 years of age, and was buried at the Almaš cemetery in Novi Sad.

== Sources ==
- Izabrani spisi Djoke Mijatovića: Izbor i objašnjenja Koste Milutinovića i Milana P. Kostića. Istoriski arhiv Pokrajinskog komiteta SKS za Vojvodinu. 1956.
- Vasilije Krestić; Radoš Ljušić (1991). Programi i statuti srpskih političkih stranaka do 1918. godine. Izdavačka kuća Književne novine. ISBN 9788639100964.
