= Antonije Anta Aleksić =

Antonije Anta Aleksić (9 May 1844 in Pančevo, Austrian Empire – 12 November 1893 in Belgrade, Serbia) was a hydrologist, military geographer and publicist, and an engineering officer. He was a member of the Committee on the Sciences of Mathematics (from 17 February 1874); and an honorary member of the Serbian Learned Society.

As a military geographer and cartographer, he made a plan for the surrounding area of Belgrade based on his own recordings (1865–1866) on a scale of 1:50.000. He also surveyed and recorded the Morava valley, that is from Bagrdan to Kruševac at a scale of 1:200.000 (Алексић, 1876). One of his first works concerning cartographic development contains a discussion called Građa za kartografiju i geografiju Srbije (Serbian Cartography and Geography Material). It was published in 1883 by Годишњица Николе Чупића (Godišnjica Nikola Čupića) or better yet the Nikola Čupić Annual Edition. In his work Мачва, са нарочитим погледом на поплавне прилике са географском картом, 1891 (Mačva, With a Particular View of the Flood Conditions with a Geographical Map, 1891), Aleksić also submitted the first Hydrographic Map of the Mačva, for the melioration and hydro technics purposes. The map shows meandering river flows, meanders, still waters, wetlands, and drainage of the terrain.

As an early Serbian hydrologists, he studied the waters in the March, situated along the Pannonian rivers, the Danube, Sava and the Tisa. Anta Aleksić made significant and remarkable contributions to the development of hydrology along with others who preceded him, notably Jovan Stefanović Vilovski and David Pešić.

== Works ==
- 1865-1866: Plan okoline Beograda (The Plan Around Belgrade) 1:50.000. Beograd
- 1876: Morava, njeno sadašnje stanje i mogućnost plovidbe (Morava, its Current Condition and Future Development of Navigation), Glasnik Srpskog učenog društva (Gazette Serbian learned Society);
- 1882: Mačvanska blatišta (Marshes of Macva), Godišnjica Nikola Čupić (Yearbook Nikola Čupić);
- 1883: Građa za kartografiju i geografiju Srbije (Serbian Cartography and Geography Material), Godišnjica Nikola Čupić (Yearbook Nikola Čupić);
- 1891: Mačva sa naročitim pogledom na poplavne prilike (sa geografskom kartom) (Mačva With a Particular View of the Flood Conditions (with a Geographical Map), Glasnik Srpskog učenog društva (Gazette Serbian Learned Society).
