= Vladimir Jovanović (politician) =

Serbian economist and politician (1833–1922)

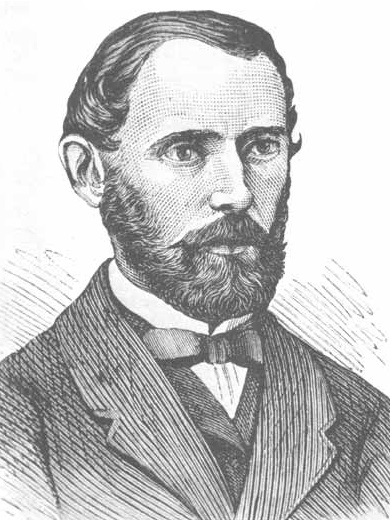
- Born: September 28, 1833; Šabac, Principality of Serbia (modern Serbia)
- Died: March 3, 1922 (aged 88); Belgrade, Kingdom of Serbs, Croats and Slovenes (modern Serbia)
- Other name: "Vladimir Yovanovich"
- Occupations: philosopher, political theorist, economist, politician, political writer and activist

Vladimir Jovanović (Serbian Cyrillic: Владимир Јовановић; 28 September 1833 – 3 March 1922) was a Serbian political theorist, economist, politician, philosopher, political and literary writer and activist for the unification of all Serbian lands in the Balkans.

== Biography ==
Jovanović was educated at the universities of Vienna and Berlin in agricultural and economic sciences, and Belgrade, where he stayed at the home of his father's relatives, the brothers Dimitrije and Matija Matić. Abroad, he attended the lectures of Karl Heinrich Rau's son Ludwig at Hohenhaven Agricultural Academy and Wilhelm Georg Friedrich Roscher in Vienna. In Belgrade, the Matić house was much more than just a place to stay. It was an educational experience for Jovanović in its own right. In Serbia, Matić was а professor of Economics at Belgrade's Velika škola, Minister of Finance, President of the Serbian Scientific Society and a corresponding member of the Serbian Royal Academy.

In 1863, he went to Great Britain in order to raise sympathies for the efforts of Serbia to liberate herself from the Ottoman Empire. On that occasion, he published the essay The Serbian Nation and the Eastern Question. In his travels through Europe, he met leading political revolutionaries. On the eve of the 1866 war against Austria, Mazzini told him that Italy should not rely on France in her struggle against the Habsburgs, but on the South Slavs under Vienna's yoke. Revolutions were to have started simultaneously in Venice and in the Balkan provinces of Austria; the Magyar revolution which was to follow have brought about the end of the Habsburgs.

He was a liberal thinker propagating emancipation, individual liberty, and education. Jovanović was influenced by John Stuart Mill and the British parliamentary system. Vladimir Jovanović was one of several major founding members of the Družina mladeži srpske (Association of Serbian Youth, including Svetozar Miletić, Svetozar Marković, Jevrem Grujić, Milovan Janković, Jovan Ilić, etc. The Youth was among the first organizations to raise the Serbian consciousness in all Serbian lands, then occupied by foreigners, European and Ottoman alike.

His major work is the Political Dictionary (1870–1873). His son was Slobodan Jovanović, the leading Serbian interwar historian and jurist.

== Works ==
- In English: Serbian Nation and The Eastern Question, London: Bell and Daldy, 1863
- In Serbian:Politički rečnik (Political Dictionary), Novi Sad & Belgrade, vol. I–IV, 1870–1873.
- Za slobodu i narod (For Freedom and the Nation), Novi Sad 1868.
- Uspomene (Memoirs), ed. by V. Krestić, BIGZ, Belgrade 1988.

Selected articles:

- Savez sila, in Zastava (No. 2, 4 January 1867)
- Naš narodni položaj, in Zastava (No. 90, 28 January 1867)
- Osnovi snage i veličine srbske, in Mlada Srbadija (No. 1–3, 1870)
- Les Serbes et la mission de la Serbie dans l'Europe d'orient (Paris: Librairie Internationale, 1870)
- Društvena i međunarodna borba za opstanak, in Glasnik Srpskog učenog Društva (Vol. 60, 1885)

== See also ==
- Jovan Došenović
- Božidar Knežević
- Konstantin Cukić

== Sources ==
- Milosavljević, Boris (2010). "Liberal and conservative political thought in nineteenth-century Serbia Vladimir Jovanović and Slobodan Jovanović". Balcanica (41): 131–153. doi:10.2298/BALC1041131M.

Government offices
Preceded by Stevan Zdravković	Minister of Finance of Serbia; 1876–1879	Succeeded by Ilija Maretić
Preceded by Ilija Maretić	Minister of Finance of Serbia; 1880	Succeeded by Čedomilj Mijatović
