= List of ambassadors of Serbia to the United Kingdom =

List of Serbian ambassadors to the United Kingdom

Ambassador of Serbia to United Kingdom
- Амбасадор Србије у Уједињеном Краљевству
- Greater coat of arms of Serbia
- Incumbent; Goran Aleksić since 2023
- Ministry of Foreign Affairs
- Style: His Excellency
- Residence: London, United Kingdom
- Nominator: Government
- Appointer: President of the Republic
- Inaugural holder: Filip Hristić
- Formation: 1883

The Ambassador of Serbia to the United Kingdom is the official diplomatic representative of the Republic of Serbia to the United Kingdom of Great Britain and Northern Ireland. The ambassador leads the Serbian diplomatic mission and is responsible for managing and strengthening the bilateral relations between the two countries. He/she is a non-resident ambassador to Ireland.

The diplomatic mission was first established in 1883 during the Kingdom of Serbia period, shortly after Serbia gained independence from the Ottoman Empire. The role has continued through various political transformations, including the Kingdom of Serbs, Croats, and Slovenes (later renamed to the Kingdom of Yugoslavia), the Federal People's Republic of Yugoslavia (later renamed to the Socialist Federal Republic of Yugoslavia), the Federal Republic of Yugoslavia (later renamed to the State Union of Serbia and Montenegro), and the modern Republic of Serbia.

Throughout the time, the post evolved from envoys to fully accredited ambassadors, mirroring the development of modern diplomatic protocols. Notably, during the 1990s, diplomatic representation was limited or suspended due to interruptions in diplomatic relations between Serbia and the United Kingdom at the time.

== List of representatives ==
Diplomatic accreditation	Image	Officeholder	Title	Term end
Kingdom of Serbia
1883		Filip Hristić	Envoy	1884
1884		Čedomilj Mijatović	Envoy	1886
1887		Jevrem Grujić	Envoy	1890
1890		Aleksandar Jovičić	Charge d'affaires	1895
1895		Čedomilj Mijatović	Envoy	1900
1900		Sima Lozanić	Envoy	1902
1902		Mihailo Milićević	Envoy	1902
1903		Čedomilj Mijatović	Envoy	1903
1906		Mihailo Milićević	Envoy	1908
1908		Slavko Grujić	Envoy	1914
1914		Mateja Bošković	Envoy	1916
1916		Jovan Jovanović Pižon	Envoy	1918
Kingdom of Serbs, Croats, and Slovenes
1919		Mihailo Gavrilović	Envoy	1924
1924		Đorđe Todorović	Charge d'affaires	1925
1925		Đorđe Đurić	Envoy	1930
Kingdom of Yugoslavia
1930		Božidar Purić	Charge d'affaires	1931
1931		Đorđe Đurić	Envoy	1935
1935		Slavko Grujić	Envoy	1937
1937		Dragomir Kasidolac	Envoy	1939
1939		Ivan Subotić	Envoy	1941
1942		Vladimir Milanović	Charge d'affaires	1943
1943		Bogoljub Jevtić	Ambassador	1944
Federal People's Republic of Yugoslavia
1945		Ljubo Leontić	Ambassador	1947
1948		Obrad Cicmil	Ambassador	1950
1950		Jože Brilej	Ambassador	1952
1952		Vladimir Velebit	Ambassador	1956
1956		Ivo Vejvoda	Ambassador	1960
1960		Srđan Prica	Ambassador	1965
Socialist Federal Republic of Yugoslavia
1965		Aleksandar Demajo	Charge d'affaires	1966
1966		Ivo Sarajčić	Ambassador	1970
1970		Dobrivoje Vidić	Ambassador	1973
1973		Bogdan Oreščanin	Ambassador	1976
1976		Živan Berisavljević	Ambassador	1981
1981		Miodrag Stamenković	Ambassador	1985
1985		Mitko Čalovski	Ambassador	1989
1989		Svetozar Rikanović	Charge d'affaires	1992
Federal Republic of Yugoslavia
1993		Radojko Bogojević	Charge d'affaires	1996
1996		Miloš Radulović	Ambassador	1999
2001		Vladeta Janković	Ambassador	2004
State Union of Serbia and Montenegro
2004		Dragiša Burzan	Ambassador	2006
Republic of Serbia
2006		Đorđe Tripković	Charge d'affaires	2006
2007		Dragan Županjevac	Charge d'affaires	2009
2009		Dejan Popović	Ambassador	2013
2013		Ognjen Pribićević	Ambassador	2017
2017		Nataša Marić	Charge d'affaires	2018
2019		Aleksandra Joksimović	Ambassador	2024
2024		Goran Aleksić	Ambassador	

== See also ==
- Serbia–United Kingdom relations
- Foreign relations of Serbia
