= Darosava =

Coordinates: 44°21′N 20°28′E

- Village
- Interactive map of Darosava
- Country: Serbia
- District: Šumadija
- Municipality: Aranđelovac

Population (2002)
  - Total: 2,023
- Time zone: UTC+1 (CET)
  - Summer (DST): UTC+2 (CEST)
- Postal code: 34305
- Area code: 034

Darosava (Serbian Cyrillic: Даросава) is a village in the municipality of Aranđelovac, Serbia. According to the 2002 census, the village has a population of 2023 people.

One of the oldest orthodox log-churches in Serbia in located on the outskirts of the village.
