= Svetozar Marković =

Serbian political activist and philosopher (1846–1875)

- Светозар Марковић
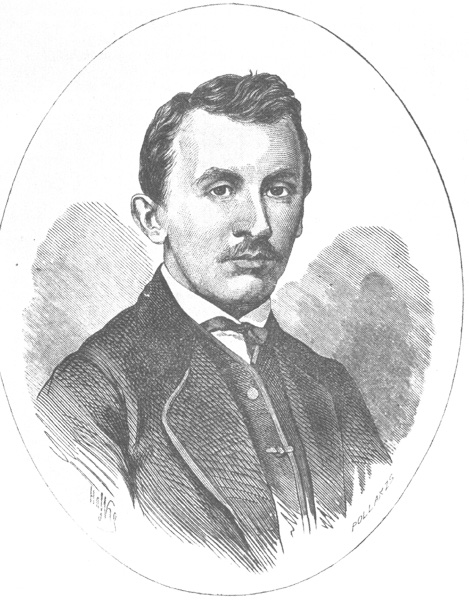
- Portrait of Svetozar Marković
- Born: 21 September 1846; Zaječar, Principality of Serbia
- Died: 26 February 1875 (aged 28); Trieste, Austria-Hungary

Philosophical work
- Era: 19th-century philosophy
- Region: Serbian philosophy
- School: Socialism
- Notable works: Serbia in the East

Svetozar Marković (Serbian Cyrillic: Светозар Марковић, pronounced [sʋêtozaːr mǎːrkoʋit͡ɕ]; 9 September 1846 – 26 February 1875) was a Serbian political activist, literary critic and socialist philosopher. He developed an activistic anthropological philosophy with a definite program of social change.

== Early life ==
Marković was born in the town of Zaječar on 9 September 1846, the son of a police clerk. He claimed to partially be of Albanian origin. Marković's childhood was spent in the village of Rekovac and then the town of Jagodina. The family moved to Kragujevac in 1856. He reached adolescence at about the time Mihailo Obrenović became the Prince of Serbia. In 1860 he began to study at the gymnasium in Belgrade and in 1863 at the Velika škola of Belgrade, the highest educational body in Serbia at that time, founded in 1808.

While at the Velika škola he became interested in literature and politics, falling under the influences of Vuk Karadžić and Vladimir Jovanović, a leading Serbian Liberal. Because of his outstanding record as a student at the Belgrade college, his professors unanimously nominated him for a post-graduate scholarship to study abroad. He chose to study in Russia, in St. Petersburg in particular, at the Alexander I Institute of Communication Engineers.

== Study abroad ==
For the next three years, he lived in Russia and came under the influence of Russian radicals of the 1860s. These were followers of the agrarian socialist Nikolai Chernyshevsky, who wrote and edited Nikolay Nekrasov's The Contemporary magazine. There he also met Dmitry Pisarev and Lyuben Karavelov, who in the autumn of 1876 took part as a volunteer in the Serbian–Ottoman War, and subsequently joined the Bulgarian irregular contingent with the Russian army in the war of 1877–78. Together with a few other men of birth and education, Mikhail Katkov, Konstantin Pobedonostsev, and Aleksey Suvorin, Marković began secretly to sow the sentiments of democracy among the peasants. His sympathetic nature was influenced by indignation against the brutal methods adopted towards activists, especially political prisoners, and by the stern measures which the authorities felt compelled to adopt in order to repress the revolutionary movement. His indignation carried him into accord for a time with those who advocated the acceptance of constitutional methods. In consequence, he exposed himself to danger by remaining in Russia for fear of being arrested by the Russian authorities for his socialist sympathies with the revolutionaries. He then left for Zurich, Switzerland to pursue political activity.

He settled for a time in Switzerland, then known as the haven of revolutionary leaders, such as Johann Philipp Becker and others. At the ETH Zurich, a STEM university in the City of Zurich, Marković resumed his interrupted studies and in his spare time continued to write articles on social and political issues. There too, politics got in the way of his studies. His scholarship was rescinded after the publication of his article entitled "Our Delusions" (naše obmane) in the newspaper Zastava in 1869, which criticized the Serbian constitution and political regime. When his scholarship was suspended, he returned to Belgrade with new ideas. He met journalist Pera Todorović, one of the future founders of the 'People's Radical Party and his wife journalist Milica Ninković, and other young intellectuals who wanted to make a change. Marković immediately began attracting attention and from 1868 until his early death, became one of the leading figures in Serbia's quest to reclaim its lost ancestral territories and enter into the comity of nations.

== Back to the Balkans ==
Shortly after he arrived, he gathered a small group of students, which included the future Radical leader Nikola Pašić. At the time, Serbia was ruled by a regency on behalf of Prince Milan, in place since 1868. In the spring of 1869, the Serbian Liberal Party signed an accord with the Regency and a constitution with a toothless assembly was set up. Marković denounced this deal as a sellout and formed a minuscule radical party.

Marković now sought to wrest control of the youth wing Omladina from the Liberal Party. The Congress of Omladina met in late August 1870 in the Serbian city of Novi Sad, which in those days was in the hands of Austria-Hungary yet close to the then Serbian border. Marković and his fellow radicals proposed a resolution calling for decentralization and a number of social measures which began with: "The solution of the nationality problem in Austria-Hungary, and the Eastern Question, on the principle of 'free humanity'.

Vladimir Jovanović's liberal supporters countered with a call for an aggressive foreign policy saying that domestic policies had to take second place to unification of the South Slavs. A compromise was reached calling for decentralization and an expansionist foreign policy.

On 1 June 1871, Marković launched Serbia's first socialist newspaper with Đura Ljočić as editor. The paper, Radenik ("The Worker") struck a careful balance between outspokenness while avoiding printing anything that would get it banned. The paper proved very successful. It was soon being denounced by the establishment as the first socialist paper in the Balkans.

In March 1872, the government decided to arrest Marković however, warned in advance, he escaped across the Sava into Hungarian territory. Finally Radenik overstepped the mark once too often when it published an article in which Christ was described as a communist and a revolutionary. Using that as a pretext, the government banned the paper in May 1872 for blasphemy and treason.

== Serbia in the East ==
He opened his literary career in June 1872 by a work on Srbija na istoku ("Serbia in the East"), published in Novi Sad, wherein he analyses the history of Serbia, interpreting the Serbian society before the First Serbian Uprising of 1804 as a society divided not so much on religious lines as by class. Marković argued that the Serbian revolt against the Ottomans had a social character rather than a religious one. He saw the social organization of the Serbian peasants who played the leading role in eventual successful overthrow of Ottoman rule as insufficient to prevent the new state becoming a despotism which soon brought to life a parasitic bureaucracy.

Marković argued that growth of Serbia while this bureaucracy was in control would not lead to greater freedom, but merely strengthen the power of that bureaucracy. As an alternative to this Marković advocated democratic federalism. Marković idealized the old Balkan family structure, the zadruga, and believed that the state should merely serve to coordinate the activities of opštine, or small communities organized on the zadruga principle. In fact, he preferred a federal and revolutionary Serbia:

The idea of Serb unity is the most revolutionary idea that exists on the Balkan peninsula, from Istanbul to Vienna. The idea already contains within it the need of destroying Turkey and Austria, the end of Serbia and Montenegro as independent principalities and the revolution in the whole political make-up of the Serb people. A new Serbian state will rise from portions of these two empires and two Serbian principalities -- that is the meaning of Serb unification.

== Return to Serbia ==
As an exile, Marković had carried on his former line of thought and activity. Owing to his political activities in Novi Sad, Marković was expelled by the Hungarian authorities, but was promptly arrested upon his arrival in Serbia. He was already known in Eastern Europe by his book, Serbia in the East. The new Prime Minister, Jovan Ristić, immediately released him. Ristić owed his position to the whim of Prince Milan, and as a result, was opposed by both the liberals and the conservatives. Ristić hoped that releasing Marković would keep the socialists off his back.

On 8 November 1873, a new newspaper, Javnost ("The Public") began publication in Kragujevac with Marković as editor. Although critical of the regime, it was less bombastic than Radenik. On 8 January 1874 however, the government arrested Marković.

== Trial ==
Marković had been in ill health for some time and being kept in a damp, poorly heated cell in a Požarevac gaol made matters worse. His trial for "press crimes" began on 19 February 1874.

He was charged with defaming the prince and insulting the national assembly for several articles he wrote. Defending himself against the charges that he had "insulted" the National Assembly by dismissing it as a mere debating society, Marković answered that he had written the truth. He then launched into a defense of the freedom of the press. On the charge that he had defended the right of the people "to overthrow a prince who does them evil and replace him with a good one", he denied that this was a call for revolution and stated that he had been talking in the abstract.

The trial attracted a large audience, including many of the local peasants. As a result of the trial Marković became a symbol of the growing discontent against the government. Marković's conviction was a foregone conclusion but the sentence, 18 months in prison, was relatively light. However, by now his general health problems had developed into full blown tuberculosis. The sentence was further reduced to nine months; it was far from certain that he would survive his term in prison. He was released on 16 November 1874, and went to Jagodina to convalesce.

== Socialist success ==
During Marković's imprisonment and building on the publicity created by Marković's trial, for the first time socialists succeed in getting elected to the National Assembly and a small but vocal group, advocating Marković's ideas, was formed around the Serbian politician, Adam Bogosavljević. Ignoring warnings that he needed to recover his health first, Marković was unable to stay in the background. On 1 January 1875 Oslobođenje (Liberation) came out, with Marković at the helm.

When, however, the police told him he had the choice either to submit to arrest or leave Serbia, he chose the latter. This time he had no illusions that prison would be anything other than a death sentence.

== Death ==
Marković caught a Danube steamer for Vienna. Here the doctors told him that there was little hope for him, and they recommended he go to Dalmatia where the climate was warmer. He reached Trieste but collapsed in his hotel. He did not recover and died on 26 February 1875, at the age of 28. He is buried in Jagodina where he spent most of his youth.

== Literature and politics ==
A major literary critic of this time was Svetozar Marković, who was also the first to introduce the doctrine of social reform among the Serbs. In contrast to previous trends, he believed that literature should actively serve the needs of the majority of the people and deal with the basic problems of everyday life. The acknowledged catalyst of the new trend, Svetozar Marković's influence was an indirect one; he was primarily a social and political thinker and publicist. In the 1870s Marković in Serbia and Vaso Pelagić in Bosnia and Herzegovina, Montenegro and Serbia were what their teachers Chernishevsky, Dobrolyubov, and Pisarev were in Russia in the 1860s.

Immediately after the war and revolution of 1870–71, the nonviolent antistatism of Pierre-Joseph Proudhon reasserted its appeal to a new and chastened generation of social revolutionaries, this movement gained a new following in agrarian southern and eastern Europe. Seminal protagonists of populism like Russia's Nikolay Mikhaylovsky and Serbia's Svetozar Marković translated the works of Proudhon. Marković in particular exerted tremendous influence on his contemporaries recommending them to be positivists in science, republicans in politics, and realists or rather utiliterians in literature. He proudly subscribed to the realistic novels of Jakov Ignjatović. Practically all the new writers — Milovan Glišić, Laza Lazarević, Janko Veselinović, and Simo Matavulj, to name only the best, were in one way or another under the influence of realism, including Jaša Tomić and poet Vladimir M. Jovanović (1859–1898). Under Marković's influence, Glišić undertook to translate Gogol's Dead Souls and Tolstoy's War and Peace.

In the elections of 1875 the socialist-radicals made significant gains and were for a time a significant force in Serbian politics. It was not however able to stay united in the long term. In 1881 Nikola Pašić and other followers of Marković founded a new radical party.

The socialist ideas of Svetozar Marković lived after him. For example, Jovan Skerlić began to work for various socialist and opposition newspapers, such as Socijaldemokrat ("Social Democrat"), Radničke novine ("Worker's Herald"), and Delo ("Work").

== Legacy ==
The Socialism of the new radical party did not survive the failure of the 1883–1884 Timok uprising, after which the radicals repackaged themselves as a nationalist party. For the Yugoslav communists, Marković was merely a Utopian. Nevertheless, his writings (extensive considering how young he died) remained influential even though no political party claimed to follow in his footsteps. Anarchist Krsta Cicvarić, speaking in 1920, said "all of us in Serbia who are democrats or socialists learned the political ABC's from Marković." He is regarded as the greatest Serbian socialist of the 19th century.

A Yugoslav film on his life, Svetozar Marković, directed by Eduard Galić, was released in 1980. The Belgrade University Library is named after Svetozar Marković, along with numerous institutions in Serbia. He is included in The 100 most prominent Serbs.

== Selected works ==
- Pevanja i mišljenja (1869.)
- Realnost u poeziji (1870.)
- Srbija na Istoku (1872.)
- Načela narodne ekonomije (1874.)

== See also ==
- Jovan Došenović
- Vladimir Jovanović
- Božidar Knežević
- Dimitrije Matić
- Konstantin Cukić

== Bibliography ==
- McClellan, Woodford (2015) [1964]. Svetozar Markovic and the Origins of Balkan Socialism. Princeton University Press. ISBN 978-1-4008-7585-6.
- Stokes, Gale (1990). Politics as Development: The Emergence of Political Parties in Nineteenth-century Serbia. Duke University Press. ISBN 9780822310167.
