= Ljubomir Nenadović =

Serbian writer, diplomat

Ljubomir Nenadović Љубомир Ненадовић
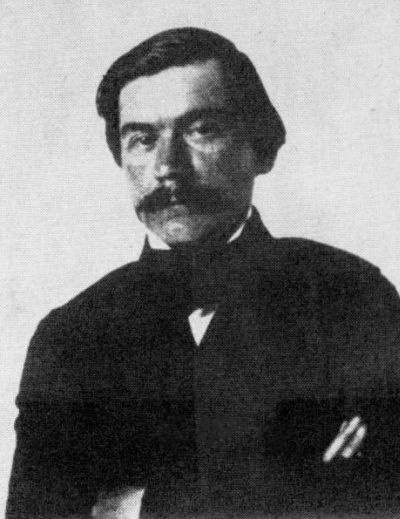
- Portrait of Ljubomir Nenadović in 1851 work of Anastas Jovanović
- Born: September 14, 1826; Brankovina, Valjevo, Principality of Serbia, Ottoman Empire
- Died: January 21, 1895 (aged 68); Valjevo, Kingdom of Serbia
- Writing career
- Language: Serbian
- Period: 1849–1895
- Genres: poetry and travel writings
- Notable work: Rukopisi Prote Mateje Nenadovića

Ljubomir Nenadović (14 September 1826 – 21 January 1895) was a Serbian writer, poet, translator, diplomat, minister of education and member of the Serbian Royal Academy.

== Family ==
Ljubomir was born in Brankovina, Valjevo, Principality of Serbia, to father Prota Mateja Nenadović, of the affluent Nenadović family. His father was Serbian archpriest, writer and leader in the First Serbian Uprising; he was appointed Prime Minister 27 August 1805 – Jan 1807 by President Karađorđe. Ljubomir's uncle Sima and his grandfather's brother Jakov also fought in the Serbian Revolution, and served the Serbian revolutionary government. His grandfather was Aleksa Nenadović (1749–1804), one of the first victims of the Slaughter of the Dukes on 31 January 1804.

== Life ==
He graduated from the gymnasium in Belgrade and enrolled at the Lyceum. In the period between 1844 and 1848 he studied at universities in Prague, Berlin and Heidelberg. After he returned to Serbia in 1848 he became professor at Lyceum.

In 1850 Nenadović founded the literary review Šumadinka (Serbian Cyrillic: Шумадинка). This magazine he edited and published between 1850 and 1857 sometimes together with almanac Šumadinče (Serbian Cyrillic: Шумадинче) in which he published his father's manuscripts about the First Serbian uprising, (Rukopisi Prote Mateje Nenadovića). Until 1857 he was employed with Ministry of education and internal affairs. He corresponded with writers Đorđe Rajković (1825–1886), Ludwig August von Frankl, Vuk Stefanović Karadžić, and Milica Stojadinović-Srpkinja to whom he dedicated a poem. In 1857 he went to Cetinje in Montenegro. He had frequent correspondence with Montenegrin Knjaz Danilo and organized delivery of one printing press to him. In 1858 he was secretary of the mission of Principality of Serbia in Istanbul. In 1859 he was appointed to be head of the Ministry of Education. In 1868 he retired and lived in Valjevo until 1874 when he left for Montenegro where he stayed until 1878. From 1878 until his death in 1895 he lived in Valjevo.

== Selected bibliography ==
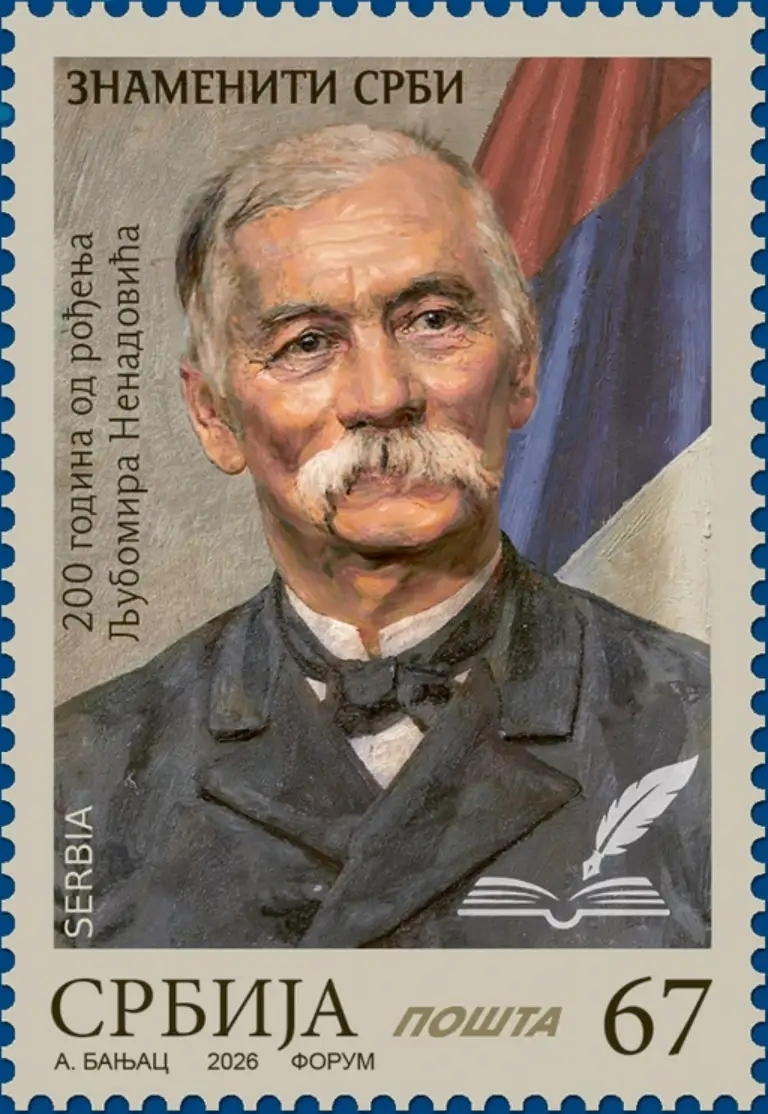
Nenadović on a 2026 stamp of Serbia

The first texts he wrote were published in Podunavka magazine in 1843.

His prose works include:

- Pisma iz Nemačke
- Pisma iz Italije
- Pisma iz Švajcarske
- Putopisi
- Rukopisi Prote Mateje Nenadovića
- O Crnogorcima, pisma sa Cetinja, 1878. godine,
- Razgovori s Njegošem
- Moja završna na klevete Dr. Mladena Jojkića protiv srpske Ujedinjene Omladine i moje ličnosti

== Legacy ==
A library in Valjevo is named after him. There is a plaquette named after Ljubomir P Nenadović. It is awarded every year since 1994 by Kolubara magazine to Valjevo citizen of the year.

Government offices
Preceded by Dimitrije Matić	Minister of Education of Serbia; 1860	Succeeded by Jovan Filipović
