= Karl Heinrich Rau =

German economist (1792–1870)

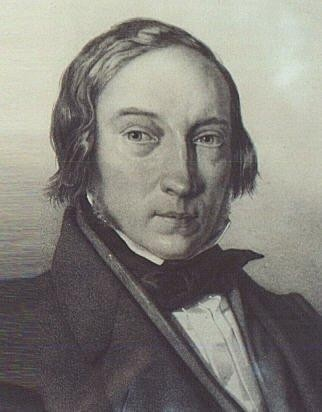
Karl Heinrich Rau in 1830

Karl Heinrich Rau (23 November 1792 – 18 March 1870) was a German political economist.

== Life ==
=== Early career ===
Rau was born at Erlangen, Bavaria. He studied from 1808 to 1812 at the University of Erlangen, where he afterwards remained as a Privatdozent. In 1814 he obtained the prize offered by the academy of Göttingen for the best treatment of the question how the disadvantages arising from the abolition of trade guilds might be removed. His memoir, greatly enlarged, was published in 1816 under the title Über das Zunftwesen und die Folgen seiner Aufhebung. In the same year appeared his Primae lineae historiae politices.

=== Teaching and research ===
In 1818 he became professor at Erlangen. In 1822 he was called to the chair of political economy at Heidelberg where the rest of his life was spent, in the main, in teaching and research. He took some part, however, in public affairs: in 1837 he was nominated a member of the first chamber of the Duchy of Baden, and in 1851 he was one of the commissioners sent to England on the part of the Zollverein to study the Industrial Exhibition. A result of this mission was his account of the agricultural implements exhibited at London (Die landwirthschaftlichen Geräthe der Londoner Ausstellung, 1853). He was elected a corresponding member of the French Institute in 1856. He died at Heidelberg on 18 March 1870.

== Work ==
His principal work is the Lehrbuch der politischen Ökonomie (1826–37), an encyclopaedia of the economic knowledge of his time, written with a special view to the guidance of practical men. The three volumes are respectively occupied with (1) political economy, properly so called, or the theory of wealth, (2) administrative science (Volkswirthschaftspolitik) and (3) finance. The two last he recognizes as admitting of variations in accordance with the special circumstances of different countries, while the first is more akin to the exact sciences, and is in many respects capable of being treated, or at least illustrated, mathematically. On economics, he adopts the general position of Adam Smith and Say, but retains a tendency to advocate the extension of the economic functions of the state.

The threefold division of this work marks his close relation to the older German cameralistic writers, with whose works he was familiarly acquainted. It is a consequence in part of his conformity to their method and his attention to administrative applications that his treatise was found peculiarly adapted for the use of the official class and long maintained its position as their special textbook. He was the economics teacher, says Roscher, of the well-governed middle states of Germany from 1815 to 1848. The book passed through many editions; in that of 1870 by Adolf Wagner it was transformed into a new book.

In the earlier part of his scientific life Rau tended strongly towards the relative point of view and a historical method in economics, but he never actually joined the historical school of economics. To the end, he occupied a somewhat indeterminate position with respect to that school; he subordinated historical investigation to immediate practical interests, and politics moved in the direction of limiting rather than extending the sphere of state action. His general merits are thoroughness of treatment, accuracy of statement, and balance of judgment; he shows much industry in the collection and skill in the utilization of statistical facts; and his exposition is orderly and clear.

== Other publications ==
Besides the publications already mentioned, he was author of the following: Ansichten der Volkswirthschaft, 1821; Malthus und Say über die Ursachen der jetzigen Handelsstockung, 1821; Grundriss der Kameralwissenschaft oder Wirthschaftslehre, 1823; Über die Kameralwissenschaft, Entwickelung ihres Wesens und ihrer Theile, 1825; Über die Landwirthschaft der Rheinpfalz, 1830; and Geschichte des Pfluges, 1845.

Rau founded in 1834 the Archiv der Politischen Oekonomie und Polizeiwissenschaft, in which he wrote a number of articles, afterwards issued in separate form: among them may be named those on the debt of Baden, on the accession of Baden to the Zollverein, on the crisis of the Zollverein in the summer of 1852, on the American banks, on the English poor law, on List's national system of political economy and on the minimum size of a peasant property.
