= Božidar Knežević =

Serbian philosopher and writer (1862–1905)

- Божидар Кнежевић
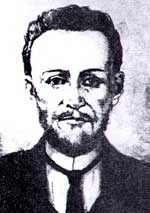
- Sketch of Knežević (c. 1894)
- Born: 3 March 1862; Ub, Serbia
- Died: 18 February 1905 (aged 42); Belgrade, Serbia
- Occupations: Secondary school teacher; School principal; Writer; Translator

Education
- Education: Velika škola (today's University of Belgrade)

Philosophical work
- Era: 19th-century philosophy
- Region: Western philosophy
- Main interests: Philosophy of history; Metaphysics; Ethics
- Notable works: Principi istorije (2 vols., 1898–1901); Misli (1902)
- Notable ideas: Law of order in history; Law of proportion in history

Božidar Knežević (Serbian Cyrillic: Божидар Кнежевић; 3 March 1862 – 18 February 1905) was a Serbian philosopher of history, writer, and translator. He worked as a secondary school teacher and principal in Serbia and is best known for his two-volume treatise Principi istorije (Principles of history), which presents a theory of universal evolution and historical proportion. He also translated works by Thomas Carlyle and Henry Thomas Buckle into Serbian.

== Biography ==
Božidar Knežević was born in Ub, in the municipality of Valjevo, on 3 March 1862. He completed his gymnasium and graduated in history and philosophy from Belgrade's Velika škola in 1883.

In 1884, he held a trial teaching appointment at Užice Gymnasium and concluded that he could work as an educator. In 1885, he took leave to volunteer in the Serbo-Bulgarian War. He wrote on social and political themes and expressed views on liberty and human dignity.

For the next two decades he worked in secondary education in several towns in Serbia, including teaching and administrative posts. In 1889, he was transferred from Užice to Niš. From 1893 to 1894 he taught in Čačak, in Kragujevac, and again in Čačak, where he became school principal.

In 1898 he published Principi istorije (Principles of history), which brought wider attention to his work. He later served as a secondary school principal in Šabac from 1899 to 1902. In 1902, he was transferred to Belgrade, where he died of tuberculosis on 18 February 1905 at the age of 42.

== Philosophy ==
Božidar Knežević was a popular philosopher in Serbia at the end of the 19th century and in the early 20th century. In 1898 and 1901 he published Principi istorije (Principles of history) in two volumes, in which he developed a theory of universal evolution and presented history as human evolution toward a more unified humanity.

Knežević speculated on the nature of the universe and on the meaning and destiny of humankind. He described a cosmos that evolves through three phases, inorganic, organic, and psychic. He held that the whole, understood as unconscious and general, precedes the part, understood as conscious and specific. When the part separates from the whole, conflict arises with the whole and with other parts, and a new order and proportionality emerges temporarily before a further phase of disintegration.

He treated proportion as the telos of history, understood as a regulative ideal of historical order, and used it to interpret truth, reason, good, progress, beauty, justice, and freedom. He argued that when elements achieve proportion and balance, they live simultaneously within a larger organic whole that makes possible complete morality, freedom, justice and truth.

Knežević argued that history integrates the findings of other sciences into an overarching account of human development and offers the highest human understanding. He also envisioned a worldwide socio-cultural system as an outgrowth of human progress grounded in science and historical understanding.

He described human life and civilization as finite within the larger order of the cosmos. He maintained that the total quantity of time available to the living is limited and that human civilization and even human life are thus bound to disappear, even if they tend toward greater proportionality within their limited span.

Knežević argued that, within its limited span, the development of civilization tends toward greater social justice and the reduction of irrationality in human life, and he described morality and moral organization of social life as emerging from pain and suffering. He connected morality with liberation from external forces and with the overcoming of ordinary motives for human behavior.

In his metaphysics, Knežević asserted the primacy of a moral dimension of the world and places justice above truth as an end. He treated truth as the means by which intrinsic justice can be discovered and distinguished between error and lying. He assumed the existence of God as a primary and eternal substance and maintained that as human altruism develops, man's reliance on God diminishes.

Knežević was influenced by Herbert Spencer and Charles Darwin. He read world literature in several languages including English, German, French, Italian and Russian and was influenced by English thought. He translated On Heroes, Hero-Worship, & the Heroic in History by Thomas Carlyle and History of Civilization in England by Henry Thomas Buckle.

== Works ==
- Principi istorije I, Red u istoriji, 1898.
- Principi istorije II, Proporcija u istoriji, 1901.
- Misli, 1902.
- Beležnica (1896–1897)

=== Translations ===
- On Heroes, Hero-Worship, & the Heroic in History, Thomas Carlyle
- History of Civilization in England, Henry Thomas Buckle

== See also ==
- Svetozar Marković
- Ksenija Atanasijević
- Branislav Petronijević
- Bogdan Popović
