= Area around Dositej Lyceum =

Coordinates: 44°49′14″N 20°27′34″E

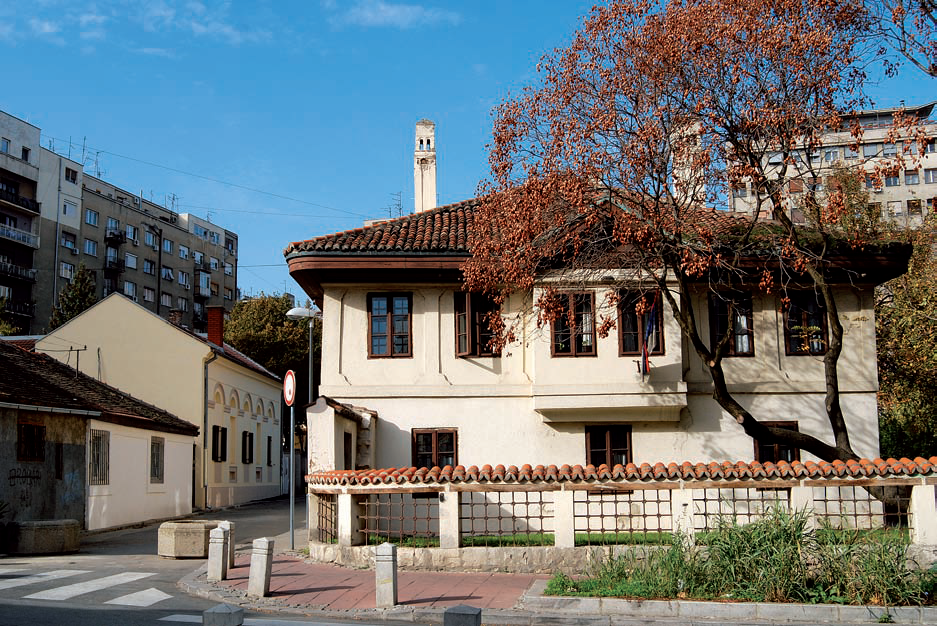
Dositej Lyceum

The cultural-historical complex in the area around Dositej Lyceum is one of the oldest and most important city parts in Belgrade, which centre formed at the end of the 18th and beginning of the 19th century.

== Position ==
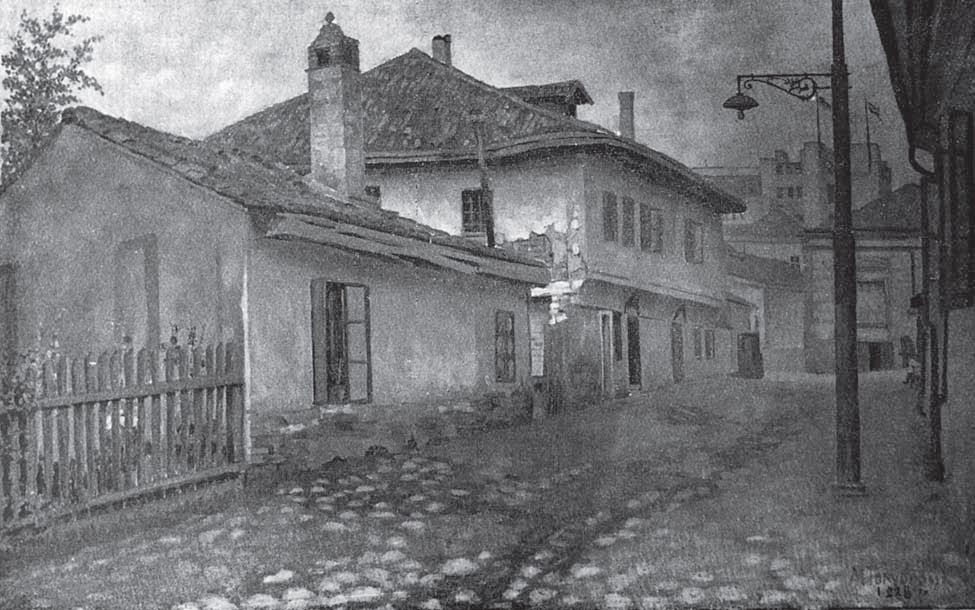
The appearance from 1928

It comprises five blocks of Municipality Stari Grad, between the Kralja Petra, Gospodar Jovanova, Kapetan Misina, Simina, Kneginje Ljubice, Brace Jugovića, Studentski Trg and Zmaja od Nocaja Streets. In this area protected by Law, first regulation directions and objects of great urban, architectonic and cultural-historical value have been saved until nowadays. Foundation and activities of some of the most important institutions in Serbia during the time of the First Serbian Uprising, Council during the Uprising, as well as the first insurrection government and The Great School, and the first Higher education institution are closely connected to some of them. Names of the eminent persons from Serbian history and culture, educator Dositej Obradović and Vuk Karadžić are brought into relation with theses objects. Stojan Čupić ("Zmaja od Nocaja"), Filip Višnjić, Ivan Jugović, Jevrem and Jovan Obrenović, Sima Nešić and Miša Anastasijević are some of the names of important persons from wars of liberation of Serbian people, to whom the streets refer to with their names, and initial communication inherited from directions of their stretching.

Area around Dositej Lyceum has been proclaimed as the 1st category cultural property. Beside these five blocks two more blocks between the Zmaja od Noćaja, Cara Uroša, Gospodar Jovanova and Kralja Petra Streets are proclaimed as a cultural property in 1999 and they all form protected surrounding of cultural-historical complex "Area around Dositej Lyceum".

Below one part of Belgrade’s central area, as well as under this city complex, an archaeological locality of Roman culture, civilian settling and necropolis "Antic Singidunum" is situated. It was formed during the period from the 2nd to the 4th century and it also represents a cultural property since 1964.

Architectural content of this area is characterized by variety in style and height, difference and contrast. Examples of Islamic architecture, Oriental-Balkan, to the ones of transitive Balkan to European architecture and monumental houses in Neoclassicism (academism), Romanticism, Modernism between the two World War and objects of modern architecture have been preserved. Rare ground-storey and onestorey houses depict the former ambient of the old town of Belgrade, while numerous academic and modernistic mainly four-storey buildings indicate the notable development of Belgrade between the two World War. Less numerous multistorey constructions, built from the seventh and eighth decade of the 20th century until the beginning of the 21st century, are in strong style and height contrast compared to the earliest built ground-storey houses. Certain objects from this cultural-historical area and its protected surrounding, due to their great importance, have been proclaimed as individual cultural monuments. Most of them are situated along Gospodar Jeveremova Street, which has kept its route as one of the more important roads from Antiques and Middle Ages.

== Single monuments ==
=== Bajrakli Mosque ===
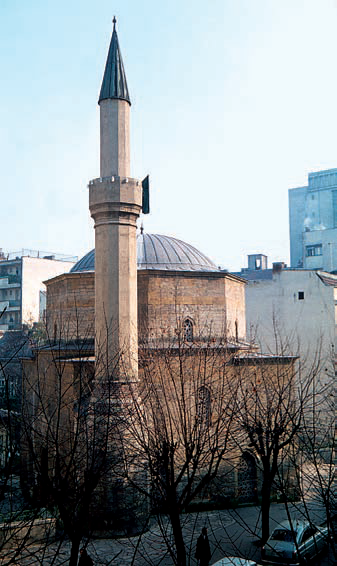
Bajrakli mosque, S. Negovanović

Bajrkali mosque, 11, Gospodar Jevremova Street, was built during the period from 1660 to 1688, as a foundation of Suleiman II. It represents the only saved building of Turkish religious architecture in Belgrade. Its name originates from the eighth decade of the 18th century, when a flag was raised to mark the beginning of a prayer in all town churches. During Austrian reign from 1717 to 1739 it was turned into the Catholic Church and when Turks returned it was restored as a mosque. Interior decoration is very modest. Openings on the edifice end with characteristic broken arches.

=== The Great School of Ivan Jugović ===
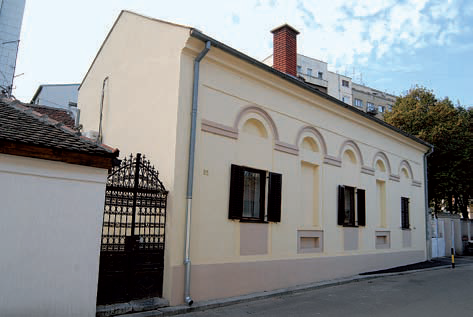
22, Gospodar Jevremova, S. Negovanović

In the original building of The Great School in the courtyard house of 22, Gospodar Jevremova Street, which has been built in the second half of the 18th century, The Great School, first Higher educational institution in Serbia was opened in 1808, with a solemn speech of Dositej Obradović. Its founder and first professor was Ivan Jugović, writer and secretary of the Council during the Uprising, a diplomat during the Uprising and Minister of education after Dositej Obradović. The Street Building has been built in 1862 and it is connected to the history of conflicts between Serbs and Turks.

Dositej Lyceum, 21, Gospodar Jevermova Street, built between 1739 and 1789 is one of the oldest living intended buildings in Belgrade. It is situated in the middle of this historic-cultural area, which was named after it. The edifice retained the characteristics of the Oriental-Balkan architecture, with baywindows on upper storey and a specific treatment of facades. It was built in timber (bondruk) construction with brick placed between with lime mortar and covered with tiles. A side room with a fireplace has been added to it at the beginning of the 19th century. House surrounded by a builtfence faithfully depicts the atmosphere of those times and a high social status of the owner. It represents the highest degree of the construction culture among the wealthier class of Turkish citizens after ending of the Ottoman–Habsburg wars and before armoured uprisings of Serbian people. Great School of Professor Ivan Jugović continued with its work in this building from 1809 to 1813. Now it is the place of Museum of Vuk and Dositej

=== The Božić House ===
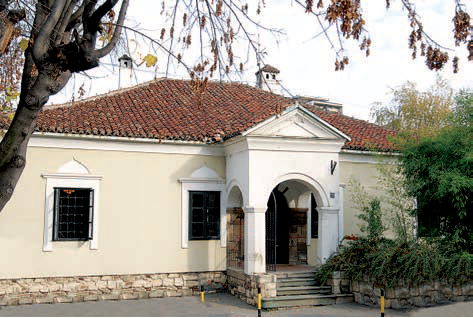
House of Božić, S. Negovanović

The Božić House, 19, Gospodar Jevremova Street, from the end of the 18th century represents a significant object of the Oriental-Balkan architecture formed in reconstruction in 1836. It served as a house of Mr. Miloje G. Božić, who was a merchant and business cooperate of Miloš Obrenović, who attended the Great School. The house has a covered entrance (portico) and at the opposite side, in the back of the house, a characteristic outer niche. From the third decade of the 20th century the House served as an apartment and an atelier of sculptor Toma Rosandic. Later on it was called "The Artists’ house" as few of the famous artists worked and lived there.

=== Turbeh of Sheikh Mustafa ===
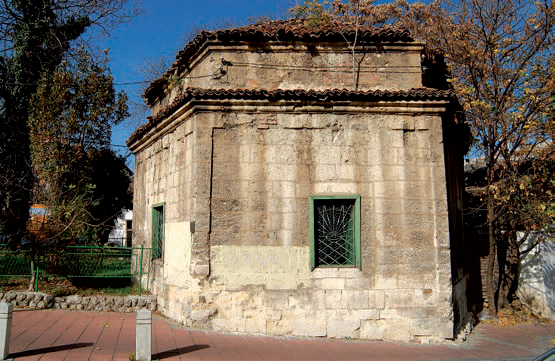
Turbeh of sheikh Mustafa, S. Negovanović

Turbeh of Sheikh Mustafa, 1st Visnjiceva Street, from 1793, and basement walls of the neighbour building are the only remains of fenced complex of Islamic monastery of dervish order Hajji Sheikh Muhammad from the middle of the 17th century. In this ground-storey house, which was torn down in 1892, between 1808 and 1813 the first Government of Uprising, Praviteljstvujusci Sovjet srpski, had their meeting and for a short period of time, Dositej Obradović, great Serbian writer and educator, member of the Government, lived in it. Tomb of Sheikh Mustafa from dervish order, was situated in turbeh and later on two more leaders of the order were buried there.

=== House of Sculptor Dragomir Arambašić ===
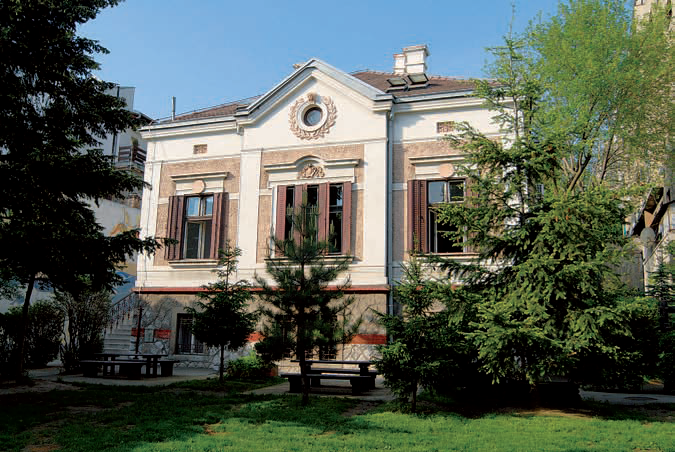
House of Dragomir Arambašić, S. Negovanović

House of sculptor Dragomir Arambašić, in the backyard of 20, Gospodar Jevremova Street, was built during 1906, according to the design of eminent architect Branko Tanazević. It was constructed in manner of an academism, with elements of secession in decoration and treatment of facades. It is situated in immediate vicinity to the before mentioned oldest objects from complex and presents modern architecture from the beginning of the 20th Century and continuity of development of Belgrade architecture and its transformation from Oriental-Balkan to European town in the centre core of the historic cultural area. Nowadays, the house is used as a part of children’s nursery "Leptirić"

Ground storey houses in 24, Gospodar Jeremova Street, 2, 2a and 26 Visnjiceva and 1, 3, 5 and 7 Simina Street even though built during different periods have in common the value of preservation of the atmosphere of old Belgrade and connection of all construction types of this historic-cultural area. Some structures that no longer exist are: Kizlar-aga mosque once stood (the building of Turkish police) at 12, Braće Jugovića Street, from the end of the 16th and beginning of the 17th century, house of Uzun Mirko Apostolović, below Tekija in Visnjiceva Street, from the 19th century, mosque of Hadzi Mustafa Cebedzija, 31, Gospodar Jevremova Street, from the 16th century, house in 1, Kosacina Street, Hadzi Ridzalov Konak from the end of the 18th century, at 15 Gospodar Jevremova Street, where later during the 19th century a big ground storey building was built, where city police, i.e. The Management of Belgrade and a well known prison Glavnjača was situated. The Building was located at the place of today’s Faculty of mathematics. Due to great importance, architectonic-urbanistic qualities and age of foundation the saved objects from this complex are considered to be some of the most valuable monuments of Belgrade and Serbia.

Among others, within this complex, the Building of Gallery of Frescos, Jewish historic museum, Elementary school " Mika Petrović Alas" and hotel "Royal".

== Gallery ==
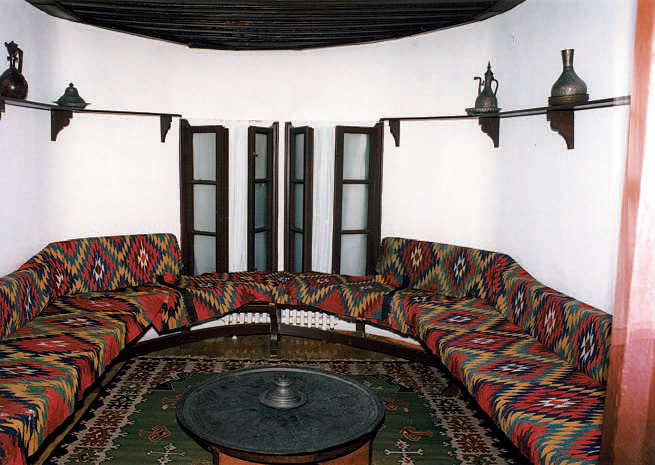
Interior, divahana

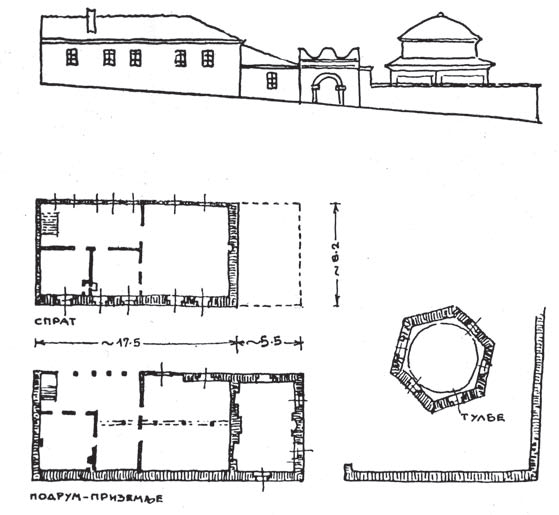
Turbeh of sheih Mustafa, drawing by engineer Čuković

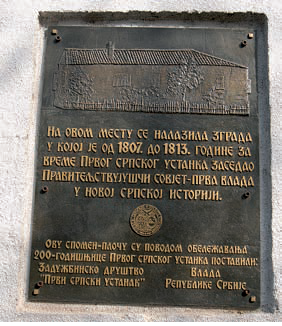
Commemorative plaque at the place of dervish monastery

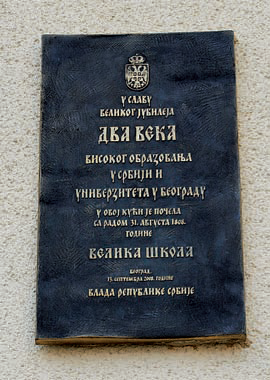
Commemorative plaque on the wall of the Great School building

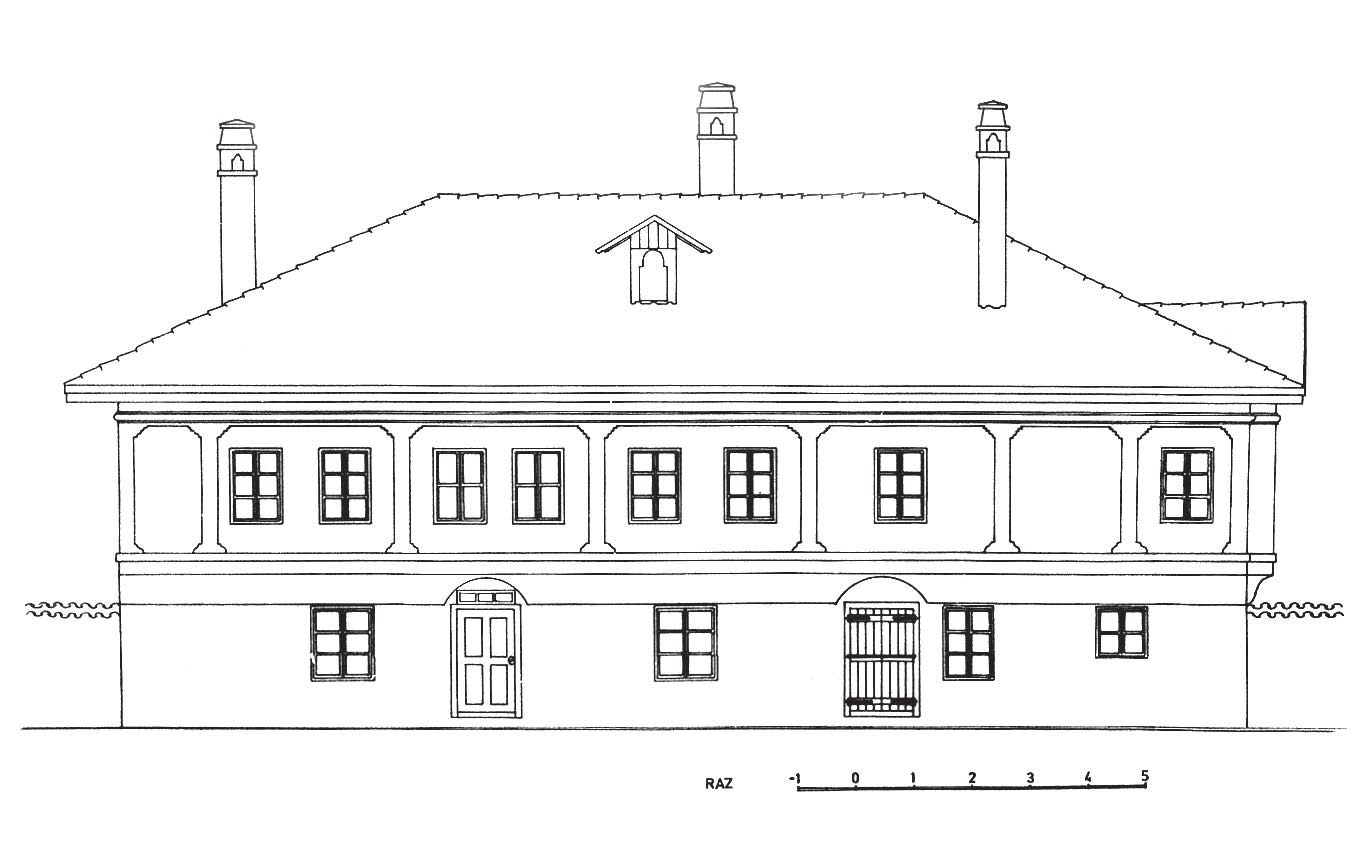
Dositej’s Lyceum, street façade

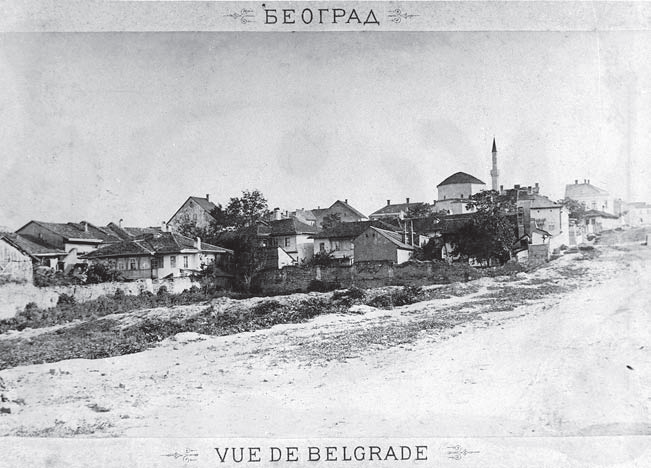
Belgrade around the Bajrakli mosque, M. Jovanović, 1895, Belgrade Museum

== Literature ==
- A.Gavrilović, Beogradska Velika škola 1808-1813, Beograd 1902.
- M.S.Petrović, Beograd pre sto godina, Beograd 1930.
- L.Arsenijević Batalaka, Velika škola, u Stari Beograd iz putopisa i memoara, Beograd 1951.
- Kosta N.Hristić, Velika škola sedamdesetih godina, u Stari Beograd iz putopisa i memoara, Beograd 1951.
- D.M.Jovanović, Iz nedavne prošlosti Beograda, Godišnjak Muzeja grada III, Beograd 1956.
- Beograd u XIX veku, Muzej grada Beograda, katalozi izložbi, knj. 5, 1967.
- Beograd u sećanjima, SKZ, Beograd 1983.
- Ž.Đorđević, Čukur-česma 1862, Beograd 1983.
- Lj.Čubrić, Muzej Vuka i Dositeja, Beograd 1994.
- Istorija Beograda, SANU, Balkanološki institut, Posebna izdanja, knj. 62,1995.
- M.Ilića Agapova, Ilustrovana istorija Beograda, Beograd 2002.
- M.Gordić, Velika škola 1808 - 1813, Beograd 2004.
- M.Đ.Milićević, Topografske beeške, u: Stari Beograd - putopisi iz XIX stoljeća, Beograd 2005.
- S. i D.Vicić, Pozdrav iz Beograda 1895 - 1941, knj. 1, Beograd 2008.
- Dokumentacija Zavoda za zaštitu spomenika kulture grada Beograda
