= Vlada Ilić =

Serbian politician

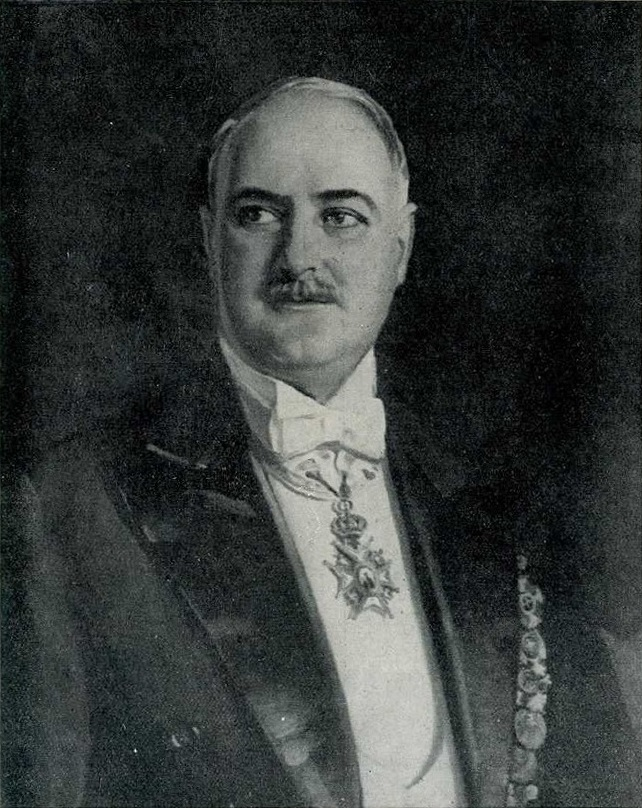

48th Mayor of Belgrade
- In office 10 January 1935 – 13 September 1939
- Preceded by: Milutin Petrović
- Succeeded by: Vojin Đuričić

Personal details
- Born: 19 September 1882 Vlasotince, Kingdom of Serbia
- Died: 3 July 1952 (aged 69) Belgrade, PR Serbia, FPR Yugoslavia
- Resting place: Belgrade New Cemetery
- Profession: Industrialist

Vlada Ilić (Serbian Cyrillic: Влада Илић; 6 September 1882 – 3 July 1952) was a Serbian merchant, industrialist, and politician, who, as a mayor of Belgrade, from 1935 to 1939 oversaw the unprecedented development of the city. Named the "first modern mayor of Belgrade", he is today probably best remembered as the founder of the Belgrade Zoo.

== Early life ==
Ilić was born on 19 September [O.S. 6 September] 1882 in Vlasotince, south Serbia, as the youngest of six sons of Kostadina (née Stojilković) and Kosta Ilić, a mumdžija, or the soap-maker.

His father was among the first generation of merchants which developed in Vlasotince in the 1860s and 1870s, while the area was still occupied by the Ottoman Empire. He originally produced soaps and candles and his occupation name became his nickname, Kosta Mumdžija. After Turks withdrew in 1878, Kosta bought the land from them, becoming a landowner. He later developed the family business into the large company, which included the textile production.

He had five brothers (Sotir, Mihajlo, Milan, Petar and Blagoje) and a sister Jevrosima, nicknamed Roska. She was married to Mika Janković, from Leskovac, but they later moved to Belgrade. Blagoje was murdered by the Bulgarian occupation forces during the World War I, Milan and Petar had no children, so only Mihajlo and Jevrosima have living descendants today. They live in Belgrade, some are in Croatia, and one branch is in Leskovac. Other brothers were mostly oriented to the business family owned in Leskovac. During Interbellum, Leskovac had 5,000 workers out of which 1,500 were employed by the Ilić family. They were the major benefactors in Leskovac prior to World War II (palaces, churches, newspapers, etc.)

As only Vlada and Sotir showed an interest into studying, their father sent them abroad. Vlada finished the Trading Academy in Vienna, Austria and then studied the industrial cloth production at the Textile Faculty in Aachen, Germany. He graduated and returned to Serbia in 1904.

== Business career ==
His father Kosta, who also ventured into trade and shark loaning, bought the cable company near Leskovac in 1896. To expand the business, he, in partnership with his sons, bought a cloth factory from German entrepreneur Eugen Michael in 1906, which was located in Belgrade's neighborhood of Karaburma. One of the shareholders in the factory, originally established in 1897, was another German industrialist, Carl Wolf, who also owned a hemp fiber factory in Vranje. Connected by business, the Ilić family soon owned both factories which was core of the future business empire. In 1910 the company was transformed into the joint-stock company with the capital of 3,000,000 dinars in gold. Prior to the World War I, the brothers acquired the latest English technology for the cloth production as they bought the "Crompton Ltd", a Belgrade branch of the "Ungarische Tehtilindustrie". "Crompton Ltd", a successor of "Hattersley & Crompton", had looms made by the latest Hattersley technology, which boosted the production. During the World War I, he was one of the participants in the "Opanak affair", when footwear for the Serbian army produced by his company turned out to be unusable due to the extremely low quality.

Vlada Ilić also applied the principles he learned in Austria and Germany to the production in his concern. The conglomerate included 17 companies, including: cable factory (in the village of Kozare, near Leskovac), First Leskovac cloth factory and hemp fiber factory, wool fibre factory, linen factory (all in Leskovac), Hemicos factory and another linen factory (in Belgrade), Serbia Steam mill (Skopje), Serbian carpet factory "Lazar Dunđerski" and First Serbian net factory (in Bečkerek), wool linen factory (in Karlovac), hydro-electrical power plant (in Vlasotince), etc. Effect on the town of Leskovac was such, that until the 1990s, when Serbian economy collapsed, due to the developed texitile industry, Leskovac was nicknamed the "Serbian Manchester". The business survived through the economy crisis from 1931 to 1933, thanks to the loans from the National Bank. After his brother Sotir died in 1935, Vlada took over as a sole head of the conglomerate. Company was boosted when the new contract was signed with the Yugoslav Army in 1939.

Ilić enjoyed the major support of Milan Stojadinović, an economist and a politician, finance minister (1922–24, 1924–26, 1934–35) and prime minister of Yugoslavia (1935–39). He was member of Stojadinović's party Yugoslav Radical Union (JRZ or Jereza) and of Jugoras, state sponsored Yugoslav Workers Trade Union. As the competent entrepreneur, he was a longtime president of the City of Belgrade's Industrial Chamber and of the Central Industrial Corporation of Yugoslavia.

Apart from factories, it is known that he owned shares in the foreign banks, in Istanbul and Alexandria, but there were also stories about secret accounts in Swiss banks. Before the World War II broke out, Ilić was in negotiations with the Ford Motor Company for obtaining the license to assemble the cars in Yugoslavia.

== Mayor of Belgrade ==
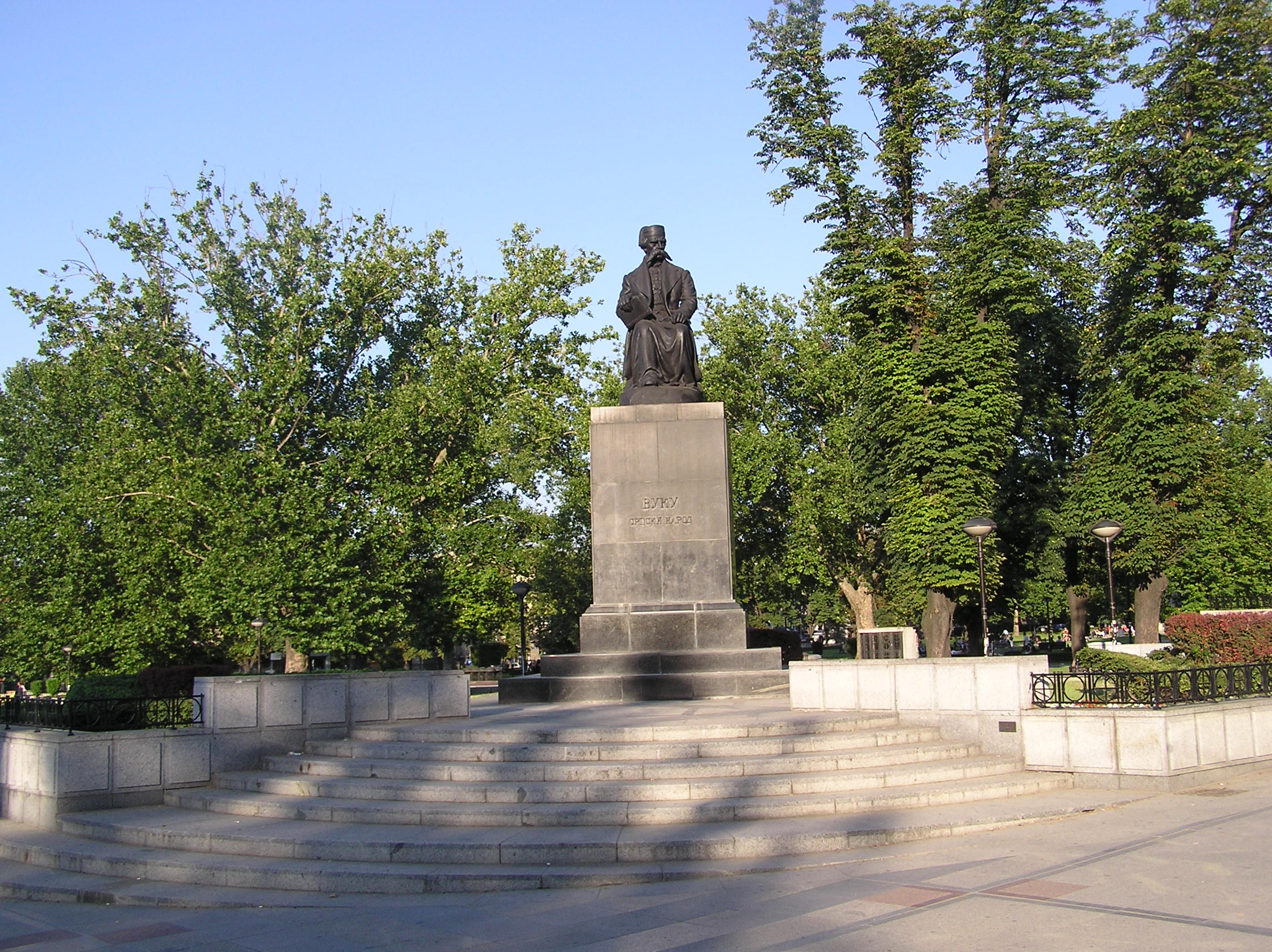
Monument to Vuk Karadžić, dedicated in 1935

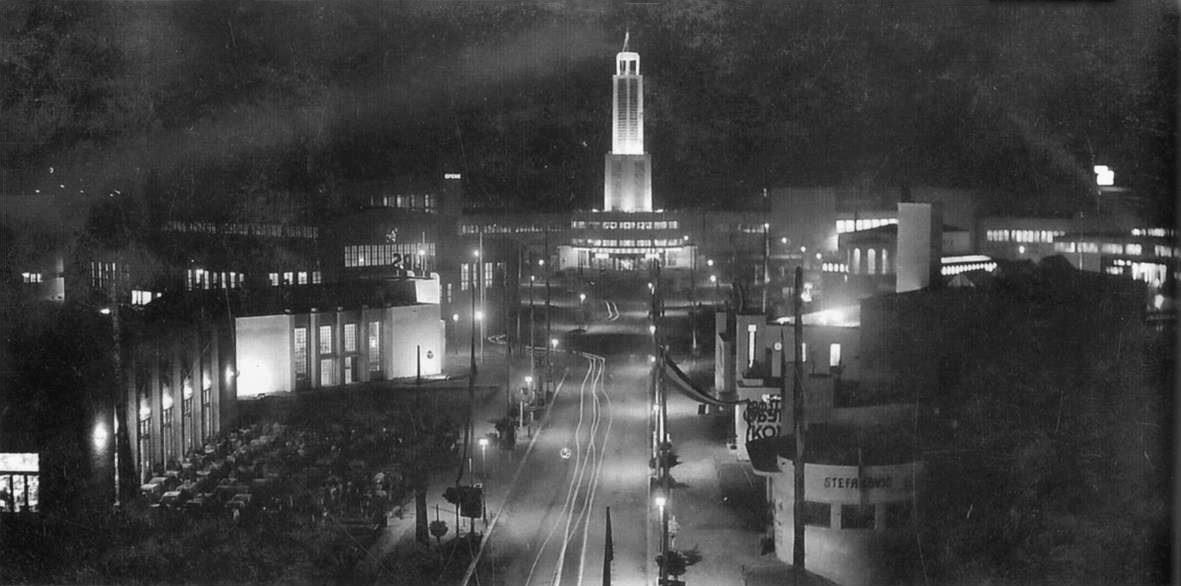
Staro Sajmište by night, finished in 1938

Ilić took over as the mayor on 10 January 1935, stayed in office until 13 September 1939, and conducted a considerable modernization of the city. He worked on fixing the social problems in the city and extensively built social housings, medical institutes, schools and children shelters, but also on draining the bogs and marshes, building parks, roads and squares.

=== Transportation ===
The first tram line which connected Belgrade to Zemun, across the Sava river was established over the new King Alexander Bridge, which was opened just few weeks before Ilić's tenure began. The first bridge in Belgrade over the Danube, the King Peter II Bridge (today the Pančevo Bridge) was opened on 27 October 1935. A railway from the Belgrade Main railway station, which encircled the central ridge of the city along the rivers, and then continuing over the King Peter II Bridge was also constructed.

=== Buildings ===
The foundations of the Saint Sava Church were laid on 10 May 1935. On 7 November 1935 the Monument to Vuk Karadžić was dedicated. In 1937, the last slum in downtown Belgrade, on Terazije, was demolished. In 1938 the construction of Palace Albania, at the time the tallest building in the Balkans began (finished in 1940).

The first planned expansion of Belgrade over the Sava began on 6 June 1937 with the construction of the Staro Sajmište complex for the Belgrade Fair and in 1938 the drying and filling of the surrounding marshes began, with an envisioned new city for 500,000 inhabitants. The new Communist authorities continued with the works after 1948 which resulted in the construction of New Belgrade. It hosted international fairs, with task of promoting the economy of Yugoslavia as well. On 10 September 1938 one of the exhibitions on the fair was the first presentation of television in this part of Europe by Philips, and the air shows and the first car show in Belgrade were held there. He personally donated funds for the construction of Military Medical Academy.

Numerous institutions were also opened: City Polyclinic (1935), Institute for Disinfection, City Hospital (1935), Polyclinic for the skin and venereal diseases (1938), orphanage in Zvečanska street (1935–38), University Children's Clinic in Tiršova (1936–40), etc. A dozen of new schools were built in this period.

After acquiring the Michael's factory in 1906 in Karaburma, Ilić sequestered a room and adapted it into the school for the children of his workers. He personally paid the teacher's wages. As the factory complex expanded and number of workers grew, the provisional school became too small, so Ilić rented the upper floor of the nearby Lavadinović kafana, still fully financed by him. The local population objected that a school and kafana share a building. Ilić then purchased a lot, some 100 m (330 ft) away and built a proper school while the old one remained in use until 1933. Named elementary school "Cloth Factory Ilić", it was built from his donations in 1923. It has been renamed "Jovan Cvijić" in 1931, a name it still bears today.

=== Zoo ===
As a mayor, Ilić personally donated the land and the fundings for the Belgrade Zoo. When opened on 12 July 1936 in the Kalemegdan Park in Belgrade Fortress, it covered an area twice larger than it occupies today. It stretched into the parts of the "Lower Town" section of the fortress, up to the Nebojša Tower.

On 12 July 2009 a bust dedicated to him was erected in the zoo with the inscription: "And after many decades, (still) thankful Belgraders". Also, one of the paths inside the zoo was named after him.

The zoo is today owned and operated by the city and is officially classified as the "bequest of Vlada Ilić".

=== Economy ===
He conducted the tax reform, concerning the sales taxes and reduced the cost of electricity (he was a main shareholder in Electrical Serbian Company), which boosted the development of craft shops. He also leveled the city budget and brought city finances in order. His tenure of almost 5 years in office was a rarity in Belgrade, as in the previous decades city saw a large number of mayors which would stay for short terms. City finances were in huge debt and city administration was characterized by the major corruption and negligence. He introduced structural reforms, austerity measures concerning the expenditures of the administration and hired new, young people.

== Personal life ==
Ilić married Olga Jovanović (1898–1959), from Kikinda. Olga, nicknamed Cica, through her mother Olga Dunđerski was a member of another famous and wealthy family, the Dunđerskis, Her grandfather, Lazar Dunđerski (1833–1917), was a major industrialist and landowner in Vojvodina and one of the reachest people in the region. Dunđerski was one of the shareholders in the Ilić brothers' conglomerate. Result of the merger of two wealthy families, both personal and business, was that Vlada Ilić was one of the richest persons in the Kingdom of Yugoslavia, prior to the World War II. The best man at his wedding was King Alexander I of Yugoslavia, and he was a close friend to the regent, Prince Paul of Yugoslavia. The couple had no children. Ilić once said that he would give all of his wealth for just one child.

He owned a villa built in 1935, which was designed by Aleksandar Đorđević, in the Academism manner. The ornaments and the sculptural sets are works of Živojin Lukić. The edifice has a ceremonial entry porch, Ionian columns, ornamental windows and is considered one of the most distinguished houses in Belgrade's Interbellum architecture. After 1947 confiscation, the mansion was handed over to the "Generalexport" company, which later developed into the internationally successful "Genex". After almost 50 years, the "Genex" sold villa, through an ad, to Nemanja Đorđević, then a senior member of JUL, or Yugoslav Left, political party founded by Mirjana Marković, first lady of Serbia as a wife of Slobodan Milošević. Đorđević then bestowed it to his party. so it became the seat of JUL. Đorđević then sued the party wanting the house back and the successors of Vlada Ilić also entered the process of restitution, asking for villa to be returned to them. The court ultimately decided in Đorđević's favor. The mansion is located in the neighborhood of Stari Grad, in modern Venizelosova street and today is adapted into the club and hotel Admiral, with 4 stars and 17 rooms and apartments. There are three special rooms with different interiors: French room, in the French Empire style, Italian room, in the Italian baroque style while the room used by Marković, and nicknamed "Mira's room" after her, was adapted into the Russian room, in the Russian Empire style.

He built apartments in Karaburma for his employees, and even his villa was built on a location close to his factories. Every year, on Lazarus Saturday, which is in Serbia observed as the children's holiday of Vrbica, he would donate the complete wardrobe to the children of his workers. He was known for visiting the homes of his employees and giving present to their children and due to his humane attitude towards his workers, he was nicknamed "workers' mother". Every girl working in his factories which was to be married, was granted a type of dowry-like financial gift. He helped financially the poorest workers organizing "winter help" and was the first Serbian industrialist who introduced the eight-hour working day.

Ilić was fluent in German, French and English. He was a recipient of the Order of St. Sava and of Order of Karađorđe's Star with swords. Also, he was a member of the Rotary Club Belgrade.

Though he left his birthplace as a minor, Ilić often helped Vlasotince. He was very fond of Petar Spirić, his elementary school teacher, so as an act of gratitude he donated money, in his teacher's name, for the construction of Cultural Center in Vlasotince in 1930, so Spirić is named as one of the contributors on the memorial plaque. Every Easter, Ilić sent 45 suits for the underprivileged pupils and his mother-in-law dispatched a railroad car of wheat to the Vlasotince Red Cross in 1929, which was distributed to 320 poorest families. Many workers in his factories originated from the region, so an "Association of Vlasotince" was founded in Belgrade in 1928, which today bears his name.

=== Equestrianism ===
Ilić was very much into horses. In the village of Hajdučica, near Plandište, he owned a "Vlasina" stable, well known in Europe. He was a member of the "Danube circle of the equestrians "Knez Mihailo", which operated the Belgrade Hippodrome in the neighbourhood of Careva Ćuprija. He greatly influenced the development of horse racing in Serbia. Officially, the race track was open on 28 June 1914 and, because of the situation after the assassination of Archduke Franz Ferdinand of Austria which happened on that day, the hippodrome worked only for one day as a month later the World War I began. By the ukaz issued by king Alexander I of Yugoslavia in 1920, he ceded the hippodrome's land to the Danube circle for the next 75 years, free of lease. In 1921 first gallop derby and Belgrade City Race were held. Trotting races were organized since 1930. After World War II, new Communist government nationalized the track in 1949 and named it "Belgrade Hippodrome". Ilić's stallion Vesnik ("Messenger") set records during the Interbellum, while his filly Laguna won the triple crown in 1941. Though new authorities took the stable from him, they kept his horses, and his stallion Jadran II ("Adriatic"), won a triple crown in 1948. His name was largely left out in the history of Serbian horse racing until the late 20th century. Today, a 1,300 m (4,300 ft) race is named in his honour.

== World War II ==
During the political turmoil prior to the World War II, German ambassador to Belgrade, Viktor von Heeren, suggested to the regent, Prince Paul, to appoint Ilić as the new prime minister of Yugoslavia. Historians believe that Ilić wasn't interested, as everything pointed out that he could easily become a head of the government: Germans supported him, he was a personal friend to the prince regent and was one of the most distinguished persons in the state. Instead, Dragiša Cvetković became new prime minister in 1939.

When Axis powers attacked Yugoslavia, king Peter II of Yugoslavia and the government fled the country by plane. One seat was reserved for Ilić but he refused, though his wife urged him to leave, and spent the entire occupation in Belgrade. He signed the "Appeal to the Serbian people" from 13 August 1941. Over 400 public figures signed the document which asked for the allegiance to the system of occupation and the German new order in Serbia. Still, many refused to sign it, including Ivo Andrić, Isidora Sekulić, Milutin Milanković, etc.

He, and Aleksandar Belić, president of the Serbian Academy of Sciences and Arts, pleaded to general Milan Nedić to accept the position as the head of the collaborationist regime in 1941. His factories continued to work, having contracts with the Nedić's quasi-army. However, he didn't work with the Chetniks, major opponents of the, later victorious, Communist Partisan rebels.

== Imprisonment ==
New Communist authorities arrested Ilić in late 1944 and he was imprisoned together with the greatest Serbian actress Žanka Stokić. They tried him even before the war ended. He was tried for collaboration with the occupying forces at the Military Court of the Belgrade City Command (ruling 333/44 from 26 March 1945) and then at the Higher Military Court (ruling 237/45 from 5 April 1945). By both rulings, he was found guilty for "strengthening the potential of the occupational forces by allowing his factories to work". Just as with all the other industrialists, this was used as the legal pretext for the confiscation of his entire assets and properties, which was conducted by the decision No. 153/42-02 of the Srez Court for the Belgrade Raion from 17 January 1947. Well known after-war state owned textile companies, like Beteks, Beko and Vunarski kombinat, developed from Ilić's factories.

Prior to sentencing, he was ordered to sweep streets of Belgrade as a punishment. He was sentenced to death, but Winston Churchill personally intervened with Josip Broz Tito, so the sentence was changed to 10 years. He spent almost 6 years in the Sremska Mitrovica Prison. His former employees would pay him visits and bring packages. He was released in late 1951.

== Death ==
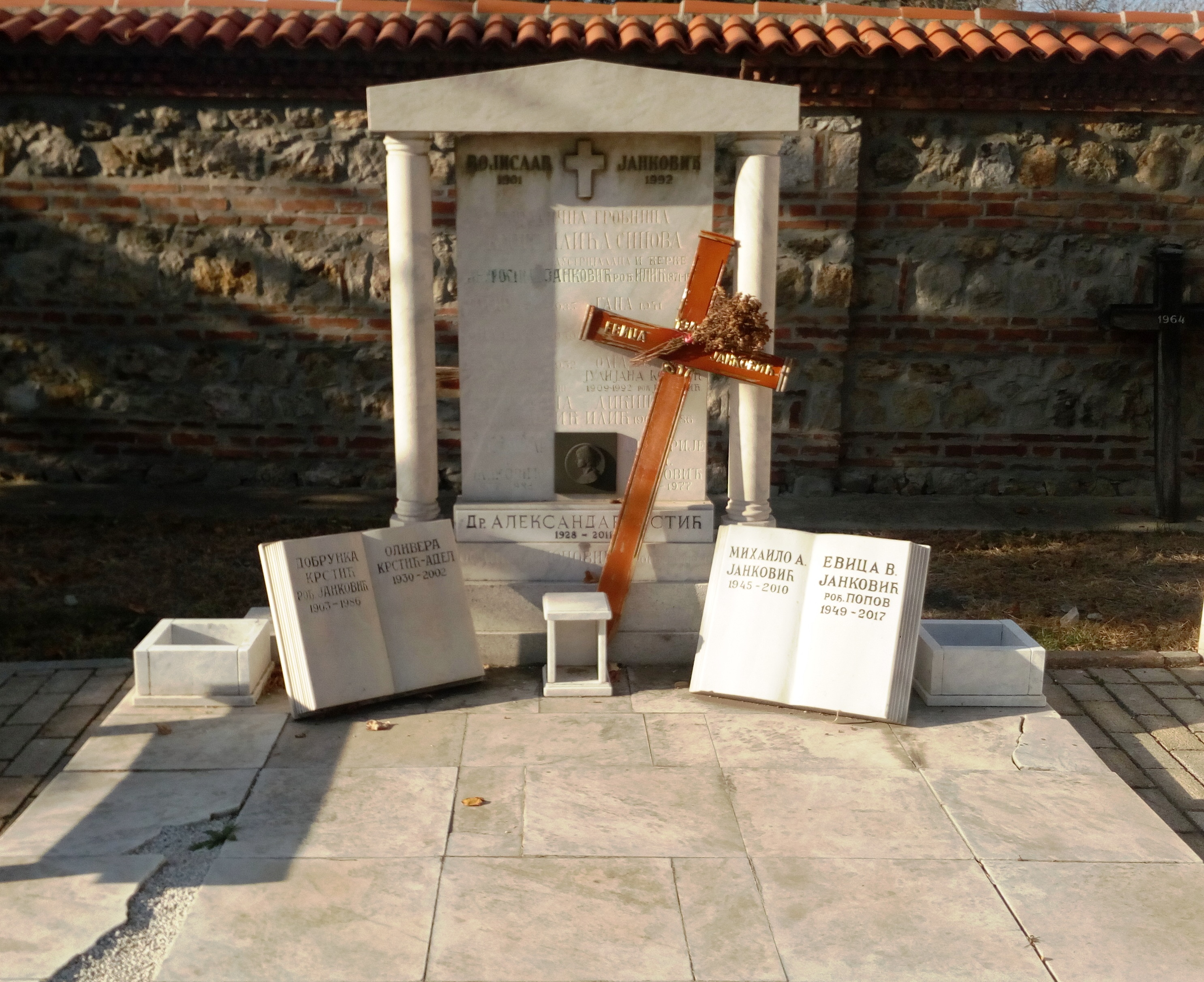
The Ilić family grave

Once one of the richest persons in the state, Ilić was left with absolutely nothing. His wife Olga pawned her jewelry, including the wedding ring, and they would receive groceries from the people who would recognize her on the market and give her food for free. She earned money as a seamstress and giving lessons in English, French and German. When he left the prison, they moved into the room in the attic of his distant relatives. By that time, all of his five brothers died with only one, and his sister, having grandchildren.

He died on 3 July 1952, after suffering a stroke. Since he died in utter poverty, his former employees paid for his funeral. The funeral turned into the silent protest against the Communist authorities, just like the 1947, much more massively attended funeral of actress Žanka Stokić. Ilić's funeral was attended by the members of the well known pre-war elite, now declared and prosecuted bourgeoisie, but also by the great number of his former factory workers. One of them held a short eulogy in which he referred to Ilić as a "workers' mother", and was subsequently arrested for it. Ilić's widow Olga died in 1959.

== Rehabilitation ==
District Court of Belgrade, after adopting the motion for the rehabilitation of Vlada Ilić, in February 2009 annulled the judgment of the Military Court, thus formally rehabilitating Ilić. The court especially stated that the "main intention" of the 1945 process was for the government to take all of his assets and properties: "He had to be declared an enemy of the people so that such conviction would be a basis and an excuse for the state to take his wealth".

Even before the formal rehabilitation, the descendants of the Ilić family started the process of restitution. Jovanka Lalić, granddaughter of Vlada's sister Jevrosima, and six other relatives, began the process in 2003. By 2009 the courts denied them to regain the ownership over the companies of David Pajić Daka and Vunarskog kombinata, allowing for companies to be privatized, despite the restitution process. Additionally, the court also refused to return the villa and the only object that court did award to the descendants is Ilić's tomb at the Belgrade New Cemetery.

In 2004, one street in the neighborhood of Karaburma was named after him.

A monograph on his life, Prvi moderni gradonačelnik Beograda ("The first modern mayor of Belgrade"), was authored by Saša Z. Stanković and published in 2017.

In September 2020, Belgrade city administration announced erection of the monument to Vlada Ilić, in the eastern section of the Stari Grad municipality.

Political offices
| Preceded by Milutin Petrović | Mayor of Belgrade; 1935–1939 | Succeeded by Vojin Đuričić |
