= Monument to Vuk Karadžić =

1937 statue by Đorđe Jovanović

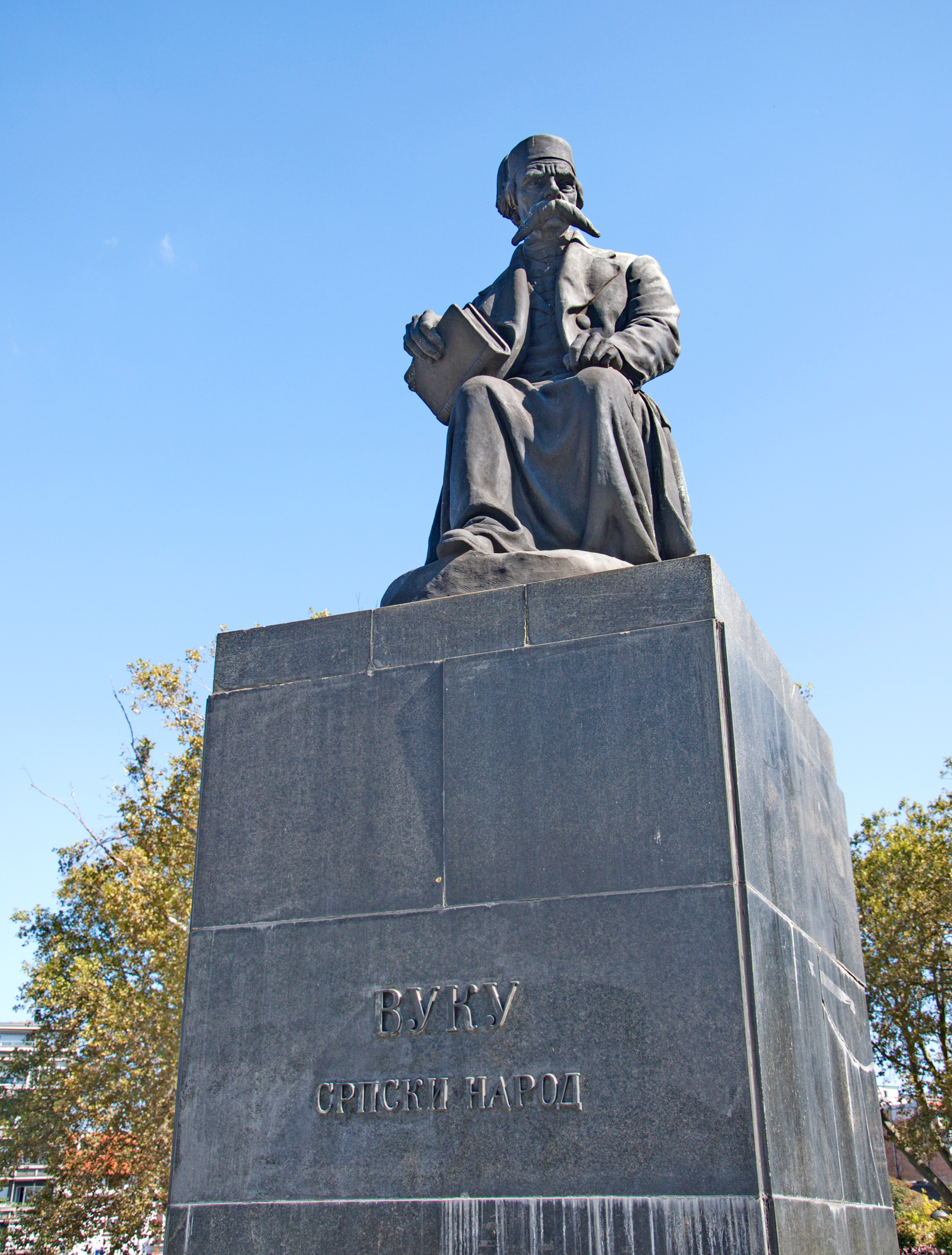
- Interactive map of Monument to Vuk Karadžić
- Location: Belgrade, Serbia
- Coordinates: 44.4818°N 20.2840°E
- Opening date: 1937
- Dedicated to: Vuk Karadžić

Monument to Vuk Karadžić is a monument in Belgrade, Serbia, featuring a sculpture of Vuk Karadžić. The monument is located at the crossroad of Kralja Aleksandra Boulevard and Ruzveltova Street.

== The erection of the monument ==
The idea for the erection of the monument was given by the Serbian Literary Society in 1920. The funds for the construction of this monument were collected for several years, through the donations. The monument was planned to be cast in bronze and set up on the granite pedestal, and the competition was supposed to be announced all over Yugoslavia. Not until 1932 was the sculpture cast in bronze and brought to Belgrade. The author was Đorđe Jovanović.

By the first Official Decision from 1932, it was determined that the site in the centre of the park in front of the university (present Students' park), between the Monument to Dositej Obradović and the Monument to Josif Pančić, is to be conceded for the erection of the monument to Vuk Karadžić. However, in 1937, shortly before the celebration of 150 years from the birth of Vuk Karadžić, the decision about the location for the erection of the Vuk's monument was changed. The spot on the corner of Kralja Aleksandra Boulevard and Ruzveltova Street in the Ćirilo i Metodije Park was set as the new and final location.

The monument is 7,25 metres tall, and was unveiled on 7 November 1937, at the occasion of the celebration of 150 years from the birth of Vuk Karadžić. The underground station was named Vuk's Monument after this structure, and the entire neighbouring part of the city is called Vukov Spomenik. The monument to Vuk Karadžić belongs to the group of the representative and monumental public monuments erected tin the honour of the prominent persons of the Serbian people. Although designed during the late period of the artist's opus, the monument bears the qualities of the artistic expression. Due to its cultural and historical values, the monument was declared the cultural property.
