= Museum of Vuk and Dositej =

Museum in Belgrade, Serbia

Museum of Vuk and Dositej Музеј Вука и Доситеја
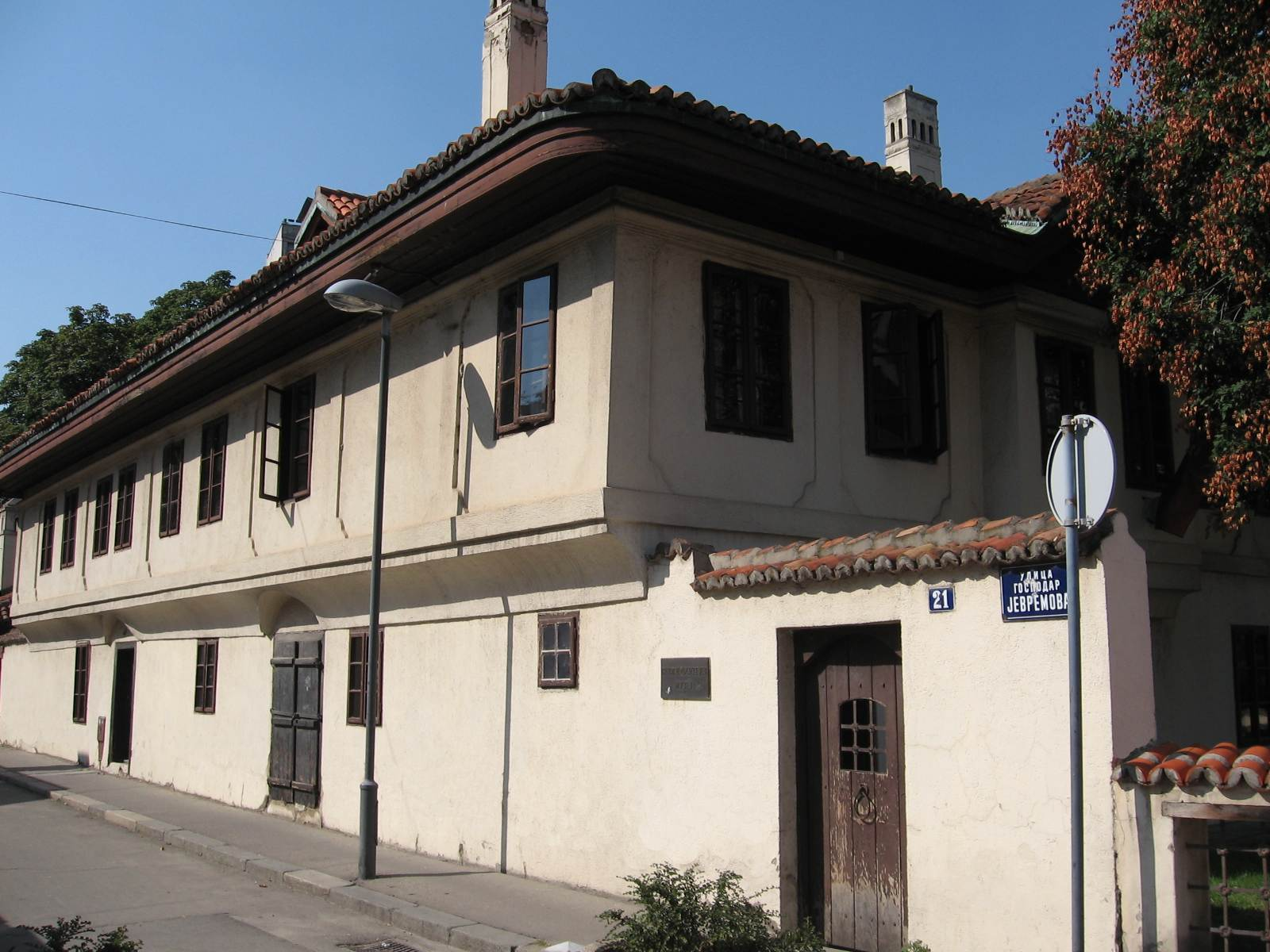
- The façade prior to renovation
- Established: 1949; 77 years ago
- Location: Stari Grad, Belgrade, Serbia
- Coordinates: 44°49′16″N 20°27′32″E
- Type: Historic house museum
- Director: Ljiljana Čubrić
- Website: www.narodnimuzej.rs

Cultural Heritage of Serbia
- Type: Cultural Monument of Exceptional Importance
- Designated: 10 August 1946
- Reference no.: SK 1

The Museum of Vuk and Dositej (Serbian: Музеј Вука и Доситеја / Muzej Vuka i Dositeja) is one of the most important memorial museums in Belgrade, the capital of Serbia. Founded in 1949, it depicts the life, work and legacy of Vuk Stefanović Karadžić (1787–1864), the reformer of the Serbian language, and Dositej Obradović (1742–1811), a writer who was the country's first Minister of Education. The museum is a crucial site for understanding the revival of Serbian culture at the time of the First Serbian Uprising against the Ottoman Empire. Since 1979, this institution has been governed by the National Museum of Serbia.

== History ==
Established in 1949, the Museum of Vuk and Dositej is located in the Ottoman-style building of the former Belgrade Higher School, the first institution in Serbia providing higher education, founded in 1808 by Serbian key figure of the Age of Enlightenment Dositej Obradović during his mandate as Minister of Education, and the building is now also referred to as Dositej Lyceum. Vuk Stefanović Karadžić was one of the first students of this institution. Subsequently, the Higher School evolved into the University of Belgrade. The building was raised as a residence probably for the Belgrade Defterdar (head of the Ottoman provincial treasury). It is also believed that it used to be home to a harem.

In time, city administration had several considerations regarding the future of the object. In 1939, a complete reconstruction of that part of the city was planned. As the building is located on the base line of the Gospodar Jevremova street, the suggestions were to demolish it and to straighten the street or to construct the street to bend around the building. At that time, the street was leading to the open green market of Jovanova pijaca. Members of the cultural board thought that the building should be preserved, as an old Belgrade building. Members of other boards believed that the lyceum has no architectural importance and that it should be demolished. No conclusion was reached at the time, so the building survived.

Under the name Area around Dositej's Lyceum, the neighborhood surrounding the building was placed under the state protection as the spatial cultural-historical unit.

== Architecture ==
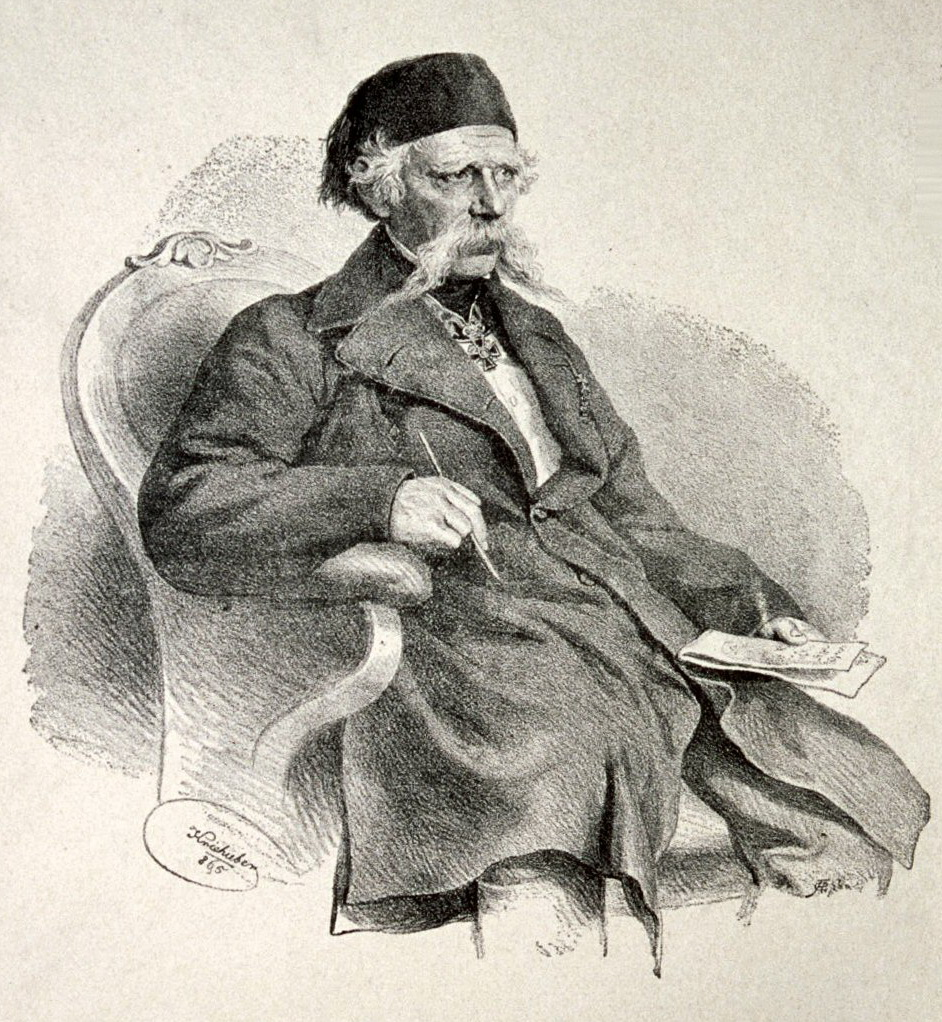
Vuk Stefanović Karadžić

Built in 1739, the structure is one of eight oldest preserved residential buildings in Belgrade today; it is fashioned after a typical Turkish town house in Belgrade. It is an important cultural historic monument of Belgrade and Southeastern Europe. The building consists of two floors and an attic. The museum's wooden floor construction was repaired in 2010.

== Interior and contents ==
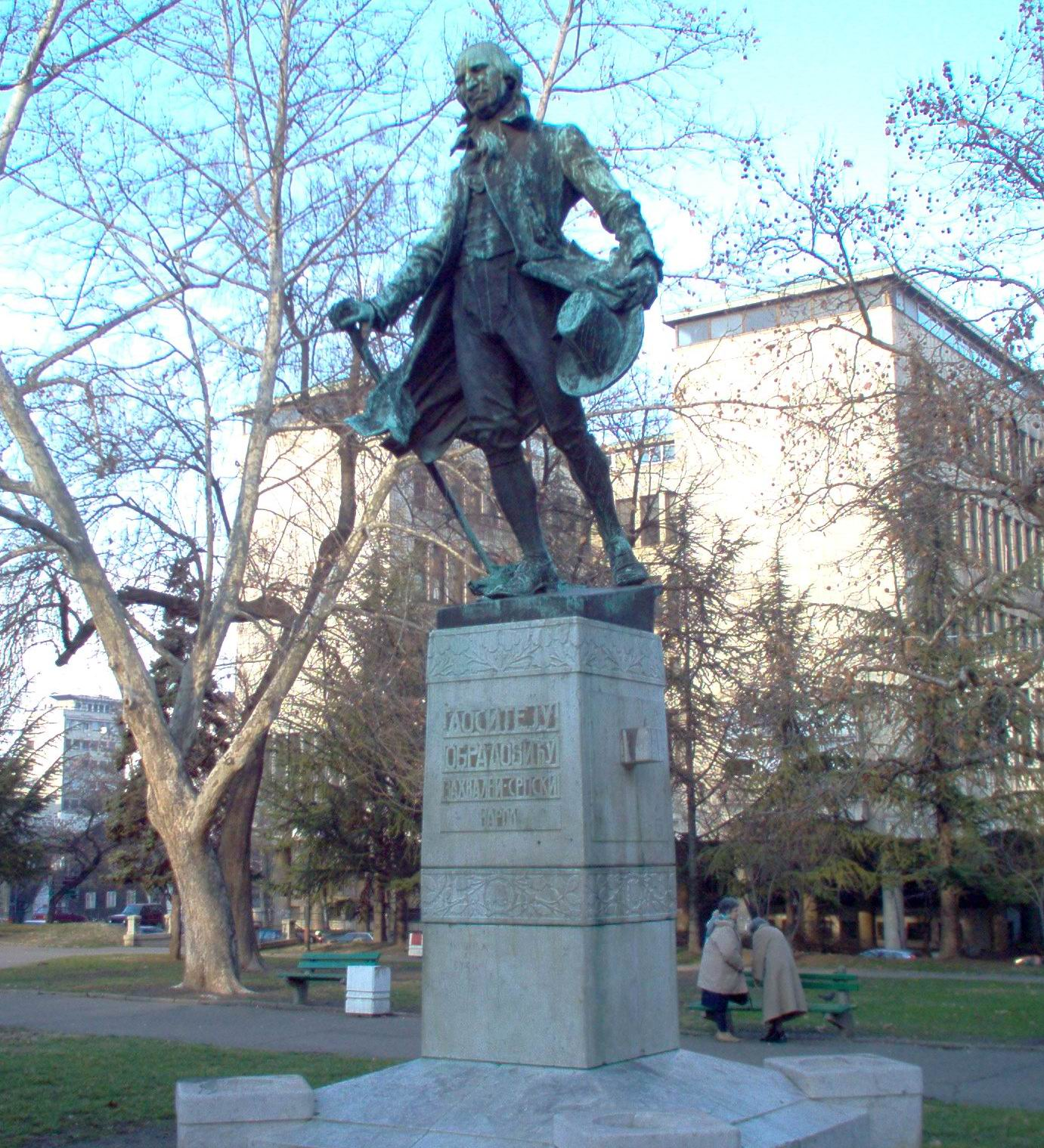
Monument to Dositej Obradović at Studentski Trg

The upper floor of the building is dedicated to Vuk Stefanović Karadžić. Vuk's collection was established in the late 19th century, when his daughter Mina Karadžić-Vukomanović donated his legacy to the kingdom of Serbia. Exhibits include objects that belonged to the writer (travel bags, glasses, stilt, rod, holster, smoking accessories), various documents transferred from the Serbian Academy of Sciences and Arts (diplomas, business cards, bills, vouchers), portraits, correspondence and a number of books from his personal library, including a copy of John Bowring's English translation of Vuk Karadžić's poetry from 1827.

The ground floor is devoted to Dositej Obradović. The museum's library, some of his belongings and a large number of manuscripts are stored there. Exhibits include a copy of the plaque that commemorates Obradović's 1784 residency in London at St. Clement's Court EC4. Unfortunately, very few of his personal items are preserved, because they were destroyed in the 1813 bombing of Belgrade.

== Operations ==
The museum holds thematic exhibits, including presentation of items not presented within the regular exhibition. Some of them are included in the outreach program all over Serbia. The museum occasionally organizes lectures, with the participation of eminent scholars, writers and historians, as well as musical and dramatic artists.

Since 1958, the museum is publishing an annual publication, entitled "Small Case", which is composed of materials and contributions of both Dositej Obradović and Vuk Karadžić, and their followers. This specialized journal was the first publication exclusively engaged on the study of Dositej Obradović and Vuk Karadžić. Besides the "Small Case" journal, the museum is distributing other publications, such as guides, monographs and catalogs of thematic exhibits, published both in Serbian and English.

== See also ==
- Tourism in Serbia
- Monuments of Culture of Exceptional Importance in Serbia
- Area around Dositej's Lyceum
- List of museums in Serbia
- Precursors to the University of Belgrade
