= Dositej Obradović =

Serbian writer and pedagogue (1739–1811)

Dositej Obradović Доситеј Обрадовић
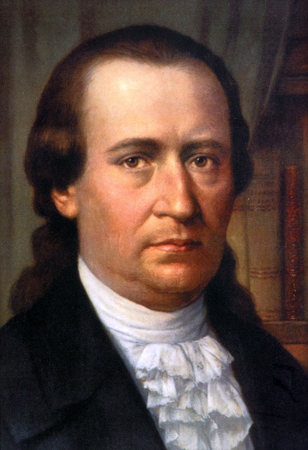

Minister of Education of Serbia
- In office 1807–1811
- Prime Minister: Mateja Nenadović
- Preceded by: Post established
- Succeeded by: Ivan Jugović

Personal details
- Born: Dimitrije Obradović; 17 February 1739 Tschakowa, Kingdom of Hungary, Habsburg monarchy (now Ciacova, Romania)
- Died: 7 April 1811 (aged 72) Belgrade, Revolutionary Serbia (now Belgrade, Serbia)

Dositej Obradović (Serbian Cyrillic: Доситеј Обрадовић, Serbian pronunciation: [dɔsǐtɛːj ɔbrǎːdɔʋitɕ]; 17 February 1739 – 7 April 1811) was a Serbian writer, philosopher, pedagogue, translator, educational reformer, linguist and the first minister of education of Serbia. An influential protagonist of the Serbian national and cultural renaissance, he advocated Enlightenment and rationalist ideas, while remaining a Serbian patriot and an adherent of the Serbian Orthodox Church.

== Life ==
=== Early life and education ===
Dositej Obradović was born Dimitrije Obradović, probably in 1739, in the Banat village of Čakovo, in the then Habsburg monarchy, now Ciacova, in present-day Romania. From an early age, he was possessed with a passion for study. Obradović grew up bilingual (in Serbian and Romanian) and learned classical Greek, Latin, modern Greek, German, English, French, Russian, and Italian.

On 17 February 1757 he became a monk in the Serbian Orthodox monastery of Hopovo, in the Syrmia, and acquired the name Dositej (Dositheus). He translated into Serbian many European classics, including Aesop's Fables. Having devoured the contents of the monastery library, he hungered for further learning. On 2 November 1760, he left the monastery of Hopovo, bound for Hilandar, Mount Athos.

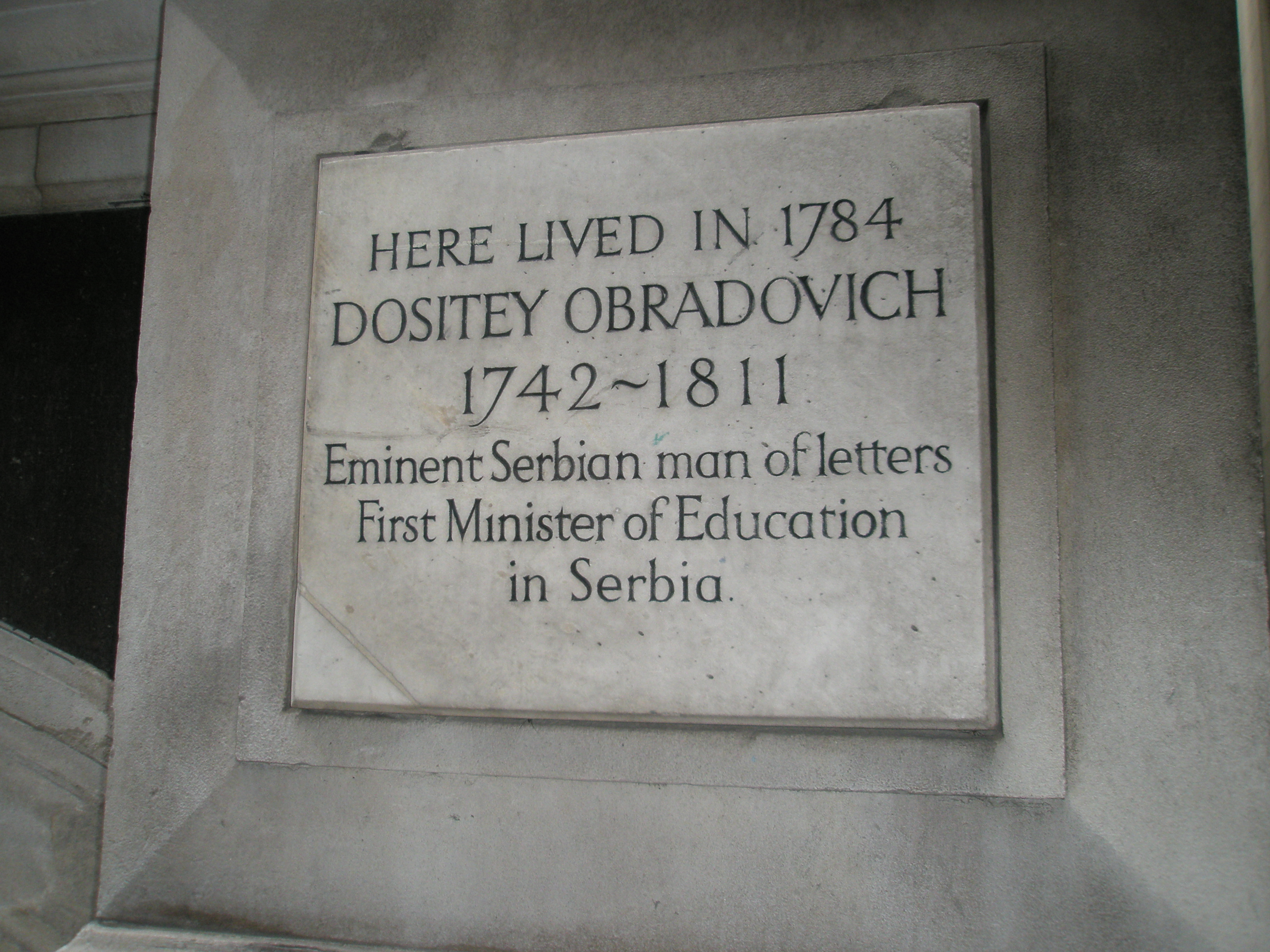
Plaque in Clement Lane, London

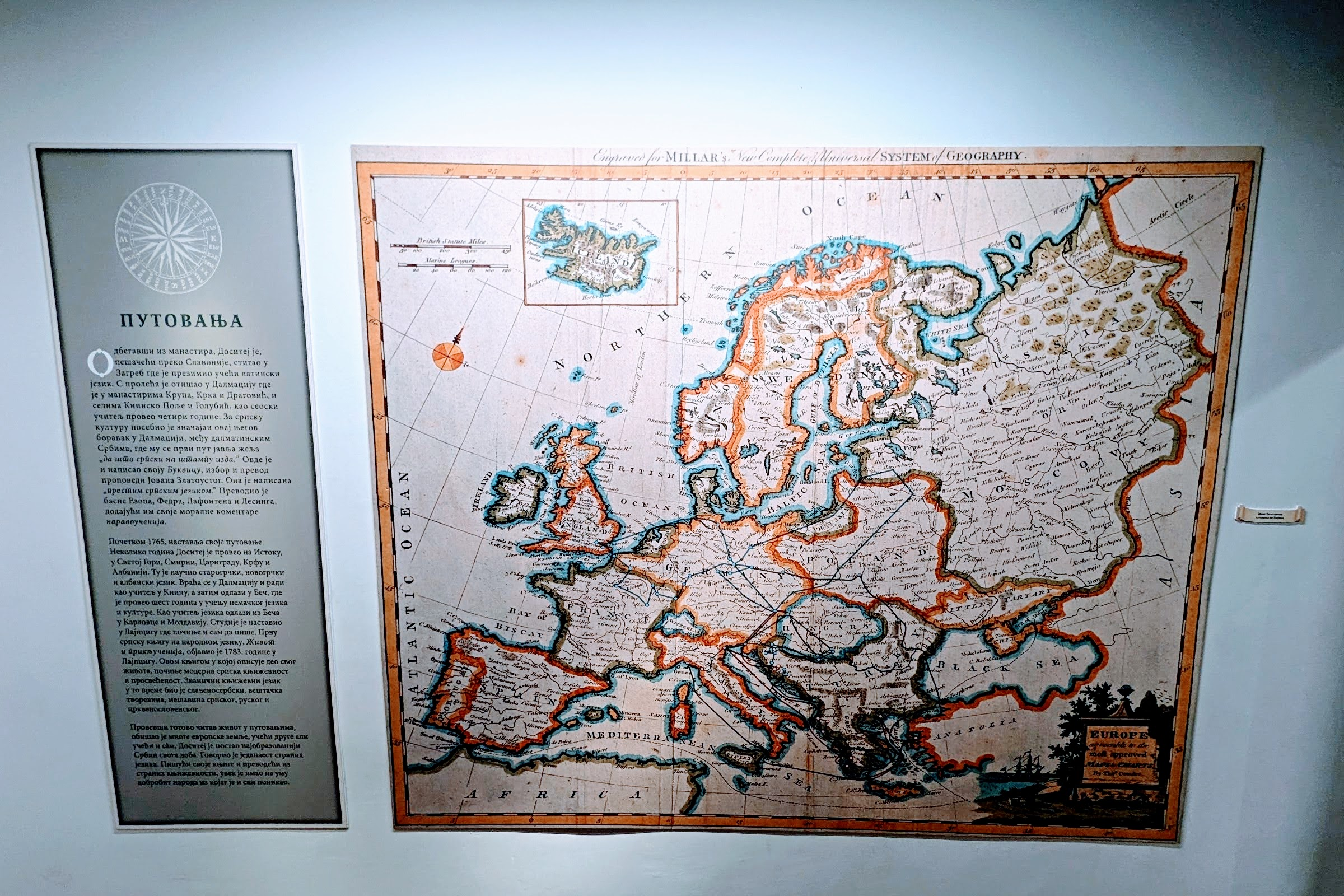
Map of Obradović's travels at Museum of Vuk and Dositej

=== Further education and travel ===
In 1761, he went to Zagreb, where he studied Latin. From 1761 to 1763, he was a teacher in a Serbian school in Kninsko Polje. For a brief period, he taught at a monastery in the Bay of Kotor before he was ordained as a priest by Vasilije Petrović. After falling ill, he returned to teach in Dalmatia in the village of Golubić near Knin. He then went to Corfu, where he studied Greek before going to Venice and then coming back to Dalmatia, where he became a teacher again, in Plavno. He enrolled at the University of Halle in 1782, where he studied philosophy.

In 1783, he transferred to the University of Leipzig and published his first work. He was a student of Johann Eberhard who himself was a disciple of Christian Wolf. More than a third of his life was spent in Austria where Obradović became influenced by the ideas of Joseph II and the German Enlightenment. Additionally, he was an Anglophile and influenced by English educators, seeing England as the land of spiritual freedom and modern civilization. In 1785 Obradović presented his books printed in Leipzig to the British Museum Library in London. These were the first modern Serbian books acquired by the British Museum Library. Besides these countries, his forty-year travel journeys across Europe and Asia Minor also took him to Greece, Hungary, Turkey, Romania, France, Russia, England, and Poland.

=== Later life and death ===
At the time of the First Serbian Uprising (1804) Obradović was in Italy, where he published his pivotal poem Rise O Serbia (Vostani Serbije) in honor of Karađorđe Petrović and the insurgents. In Dositej's song, Serbia is pictured as a ‘sleeping Beauty’, asleep for centuries. The verses call upon her to wake up and give an example to her ‘sisters’, Bosnia, Herzegovina and Montenegro. In 1807 Obradović moved to Belgrade at the invitation of Karađorđe Petrović, to become, in the newly organized government, Serbia's first minister of education. In 1809, he founded the Velika škola, the first higher education institution in Serbia that later developed into a university. The school was located in a two-story building in Zajrek, one of the oldest parts of Belgrade. The building now serves as the Museum of Vuk and Dositej.

Obradović wrote, first individual biographies, and quickly the genre expanded to the form of biographical collection modelled on examples of Nepos, Suetonius, Plutarch, or Diogenes Laertius.

Obradović helped introduce to the Serbs the literature of certain western European countries. He and Vuk Karadžić, whom Obradović influenced, are recognized as the fathers of modern Serbian literature. Because the Serbian populace often suffered famine, Obradović also introduced potato cultivation to Serbia.

Dositej Obradović died in Belgrade, Serbia, in 1811. He was honored with a large funeral procession and buried in Cathedral of Saint Archangel Michael. A monument to Obradović was erected by the Kalemegan park entrance in 1914. It was moved in 1930 to a prominent spot at the newly opened Academic Park, close to the University of Belgrade administration and governance building, where it still stands.

== In popular culture ==
- Pillow of my grave, a television miniseries based on the biography of Dositej Obradović and directed by Sava Mrmak, was produced in 1990 by the Serbian broadcasting service RTS.

== Works ==
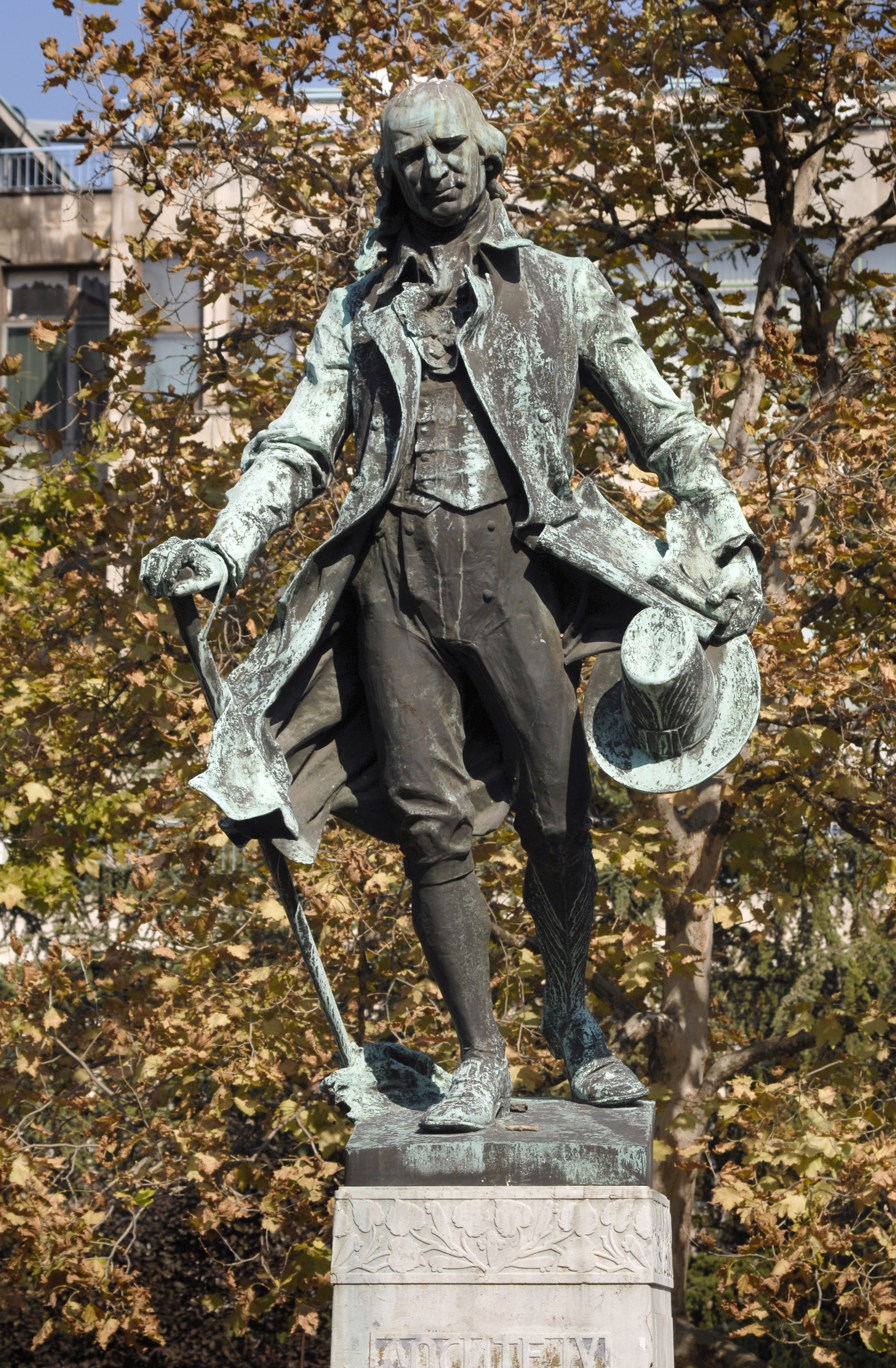
Monument to Dositej Obradović in Academic Park

- Slovo poučiteljno Gosp. Georg. Joakima Colikofera, Leipzig, 1774, 31 pp.
- Pismo Haralampiju, 1783.
- Život i priključenija D.O., Leipzig, 1783.
- Sovjeti zdravago razuma, Leipzig, 1784, 119 pp.
- Езопове и прочихъ разнихъ баснотворцевъ съ различни езика на славеносербски езикъ преведене [Aesop's and Various Other Fable-Formers', from Various Languages to Slavo-Serbian Translated] (in Serbian). Leipzig: Johann Gottlob Immanuel Breitkopf. 1788. 451 pp.
- Pesme o izbavleniju Serbije, Vienna, 1789, 4 pp.
- Sobranije raznih naravoučitelnih veščej, Pécs, 1793, 2 + 316 pp.
- Etika ili filozofija naravnoučitelna, Venice, 1803, 160 pp.
- Vostani Serbije, 1804.
- Mezimac, Budim 1818, 230 + 11 pp.
- Ižica, 1830
- Pisma, Budapest, 1829, 126 pp.
- Prvenac, Karlštat 1930, 17 + 168 pp.
- Jastuk roda moga (lost), 1813

=== Translations ===
- Slovo poučitelno, 1784.
- Istina i prelest, (short story), 1788.
- Put u jedan dan, (short story), 1788.
- Aesop's Fables
- Hristoitija
- Bukvica
- Etika
- Venac
- Damon
- Ingleska izrečenija

== See also ==
- Fables
- Vostani Serbije
- Avram Mrazović
- Age of Enlightenment

== Sources ==
- Skerlić, Jovan (1914). Istorija nove srpske književnosti (PDF) (in Serbian). Belgrade. pp. 58–76.

Government offices
Preceded by Post established	Minister of Education of Serbia; 1807–1811	Succeeded by Ivan Jugović
