= Božić house =

Serbian cultural monument

- Божићева кућа (Serbian)
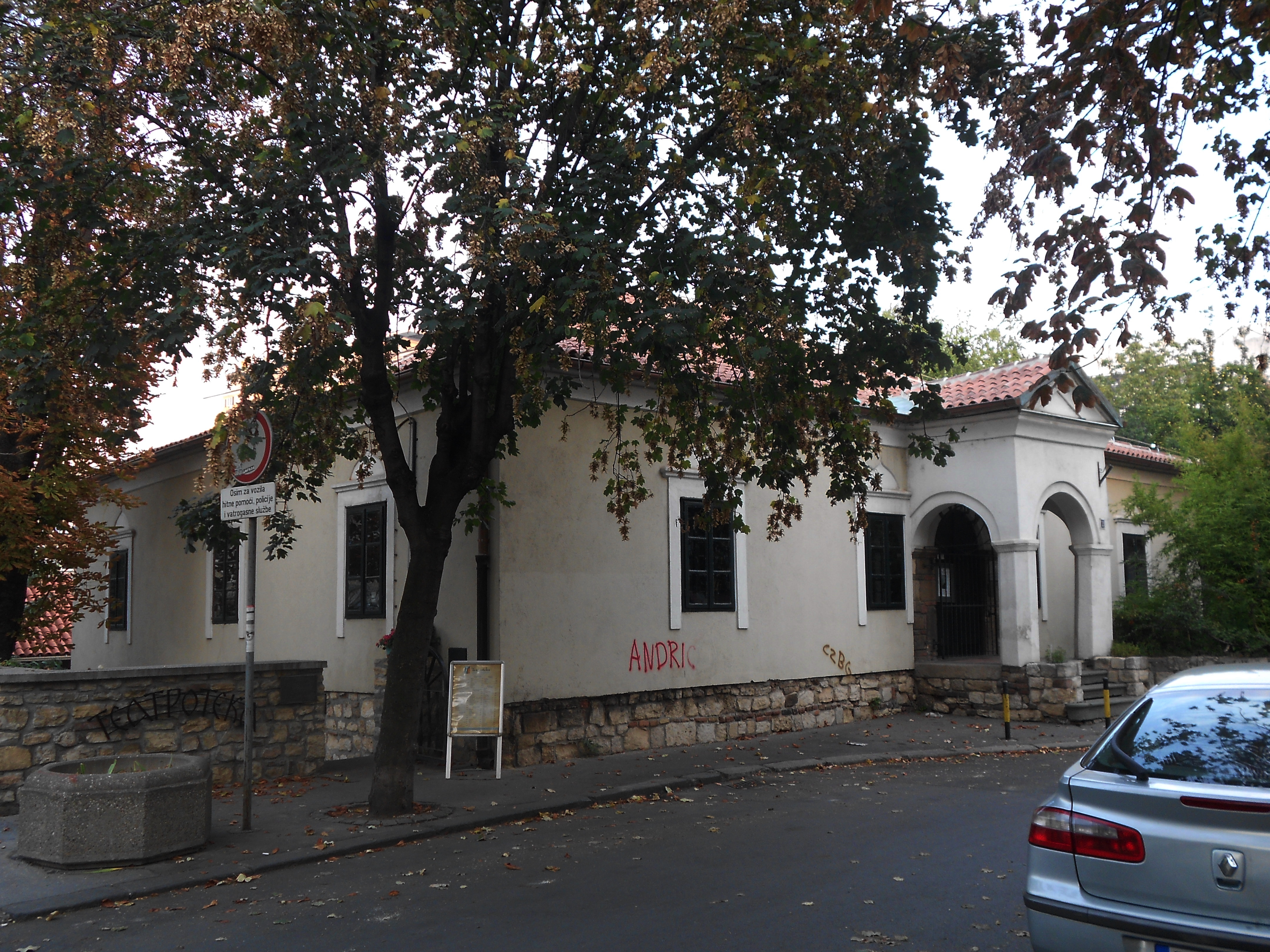
- Interactive map of Božić house
- 44.821°N 20.458°E
- Location: Belgrade, 11000, Serbia

The Božić family house is located in Belgrade, at 19 Gospodar Jevremova Street. Today, this house represents a cultural monument of great importance for Serbia.

== Miloje G. Božić ==
Miloje G. Božić was born in village Čumić, near Kragujevac, and was a merchant in Belgrade. From his biography stands out information that Božić, due to his disagreement with Miloš Obrenović's dynasty, helped royal family Karađorđević to gain power. Using the technique of oil on canvas, painter Jovan Popović immortalized Miloje G. Božić in a painting in 1841.

== History and architecture ==
Božić’s family house was built in 1836. It was the middle class ground floor house built above the cellar of a demolished Turkish building. Over the main entrance was incised the initials of the owner, and the year of building. House represents a classic example of transitory type architecture – the disposition of the floor plan is symmetrical, of Balkan type, while the facades reflect influences of western European architecture with its proportions, the rhythm of apertures and decorative elements. In the nineteenth century the house was used exclusively as a residence. Rista Hadži-Popović, exporter possessed house until 1920. From year 1920 to 1924 house served as the studio and apartment of Toma Rosandić, and was later turned into a "painters house" where eminent Belgrade painters and sculptors used to live and work. The Serbian Museum of Theater Art also had their premises there in 1951. The house represents one of the oldest preserved houses in Belgrade.

== Building today ==
Božić’s family house is a part of Area around Dositej's Lyceum, a spatial cultural-historical unit of exceptional importance.
