= Monument to Dositej Obradović =

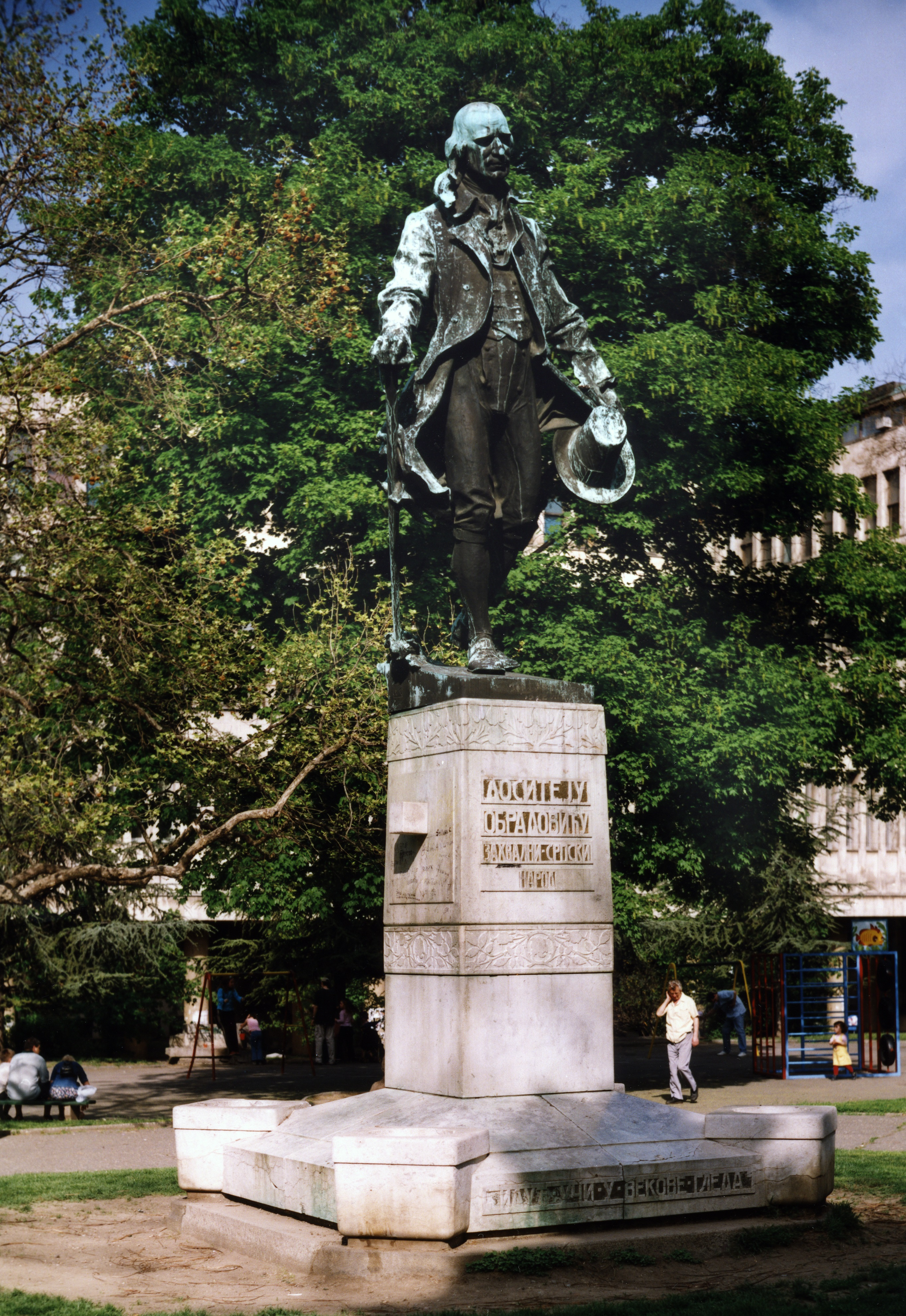
- Interactive map of Monument to Dositej Obradović
- Location: Belgrade, Serbia
- Coordinates: 44.8191°N 20.4584°E
- Opening date: 1914
- Dedicated to: Dositej Obradović

The monument to Dositej Obradović is located in the Academy Park, Belgrade, Serbia. Obradović was Serbian writer, educator and the reformer from the revolutionary period of the national awakening and rebirth. Also in the park are monuments of the prominent Serbian scientists Josif Pančić and Jovan Cvijić, near Belgrade University.

== Design and construction ==
The monument was built as a result of the initiative of the Serbian Literary Cooperative and Јоvan Skerlić, an admirer of Obradović. After some preliminary discussions for the monument, formal plans were made to construct the monument for the 100 year anniversary of Obradović's death in 1911. The Committee for the Celebration was formed, led by Stojan Novaković and Jovan Skerlić, to plan for a series of festivities and the construction of the monument. The project was supported by the Municipality of Belgrade that provided funding and conducted a competition for Yugoslav artists to design the monument of a full-sized figure of Obradović. (Note: The jury consisted of: Ljuba Davidović, the president of the Municipality of Belgrade, Bogdan Popović, Andra Stevanović and Bogdan Gavrilović, the university professors, Vladimir R. Petković, the assistant director of the National Museum and Leger, head of municipal engineers. Twelve artists whose realized models were exposed in a primary school near Saborna Church (the Orthodox Cathedral, now the Primary School King Peter I) responded to the competition. For the three award-winning works the Commission selected models of Rudolf Valdec, Toma Rosandić and Simeon Roksandić, and for the best work declared the work of Rudolf Valdec who was entrusted the construction of the monument.) Rudolf Valdec was the artist selected from the competition. In an article on the occasion of presentation of the models received for the competition, the magazine New Spark said about the Valdec's design: "Dositej was conceived as a traveller, boldly moved forward by some supernatural power, which was awakened in him. His eyes were directed to the lofty target, to which his feet should carry him. Books under his arm and pen in his hand show his noble mission. It is felt that the way, which he clears before him, goes to the glory and eternity."

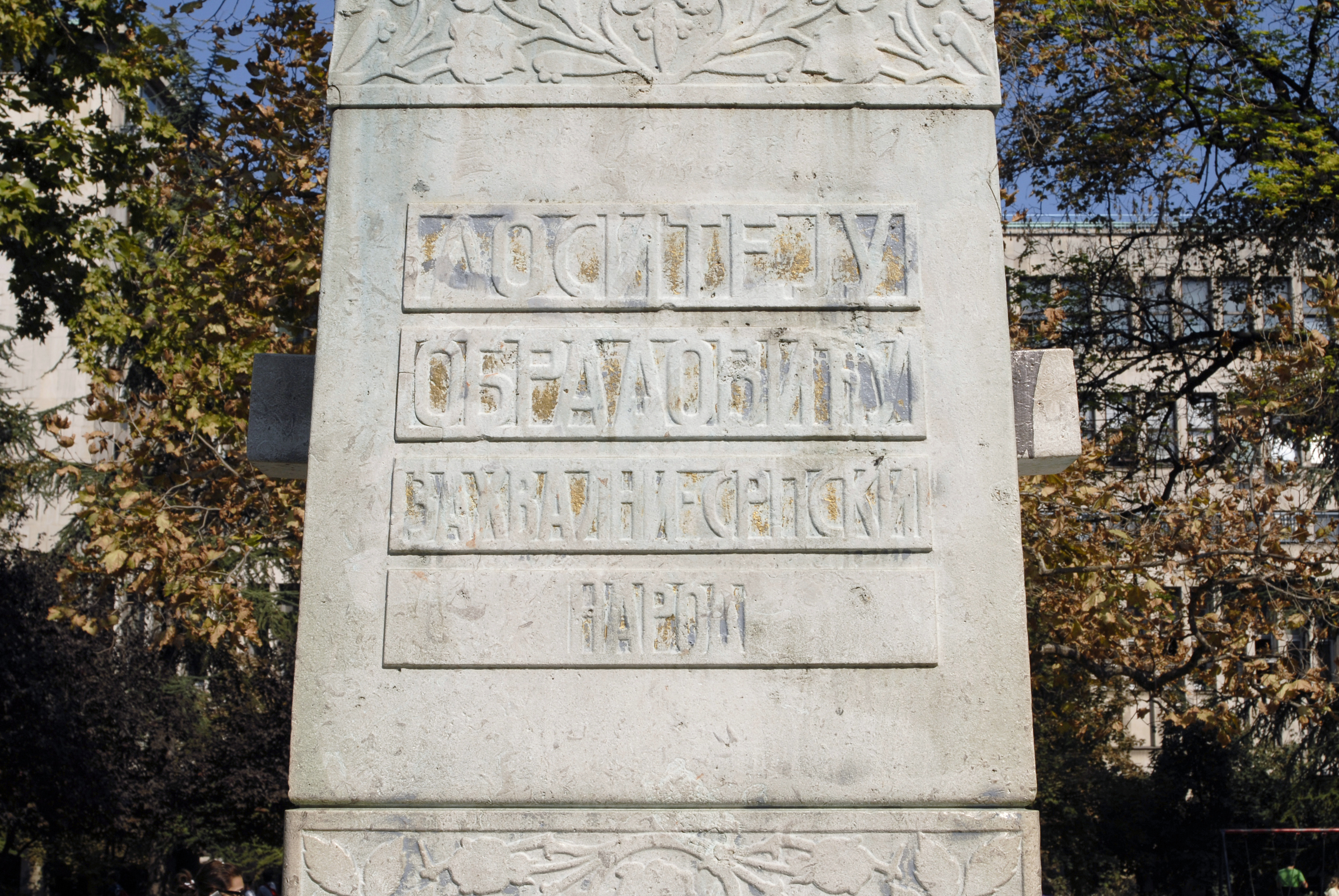
the inscription on the monument

Although it was originally scheduled the monument to be officially unveiled on 1 September 1911, due to the site selection for its set up, this event took place three years later on was officially unveiled on 27 May 1914. (Note: The Committee for the Celebration stated in its proclamation that it would be placed in "one of the most beautiful places in Belgrade." One suggestion was that the monument should be erected “in a renovated Terazije”, the other on the street square in Makedonska Street, but these ideas were quickly abandoned.) in the Square in front of the Hotel “Serbian Crown” (now the City Library of Belgrade).

== Description ==
It was installed as a pair to Karađorđe's monument, unveiled a year before, at the end of the main path banked with the busts of important Serbs. In this way Obradović was brought in direct parallel with the leader of the First Serbian Uprising. The sculpture was placed on a high rectangular plinth on whose front side was carved the following inscription: “To Dositej Obradović, from Grateful Serbian People”, and on the reverse the writer's motto taken from the Letter to Haralampije: "I will write for the mind, heart and character of the people, for brothers Serbs whatever their law or religion." Obradović is represented in movement, with a hat, books and a stick in his hand, while at the bottom of the plinth there is an inscription of his own words: “He learns walking, looking into the future!”

== Academic park ==
Until the end of the third decade of the 20th century, the monument was at its original location, in the square in front of the Hotel Serbian Crown, when, during the formation of the Academic park on the site of the former Great Market, it was moved to this park as a pair to the monument dedicated to the great Serbian scientist Josif Pančić. The Monument to Dositej Obradović was declared cultural monument in 1967.

== Gallery ==
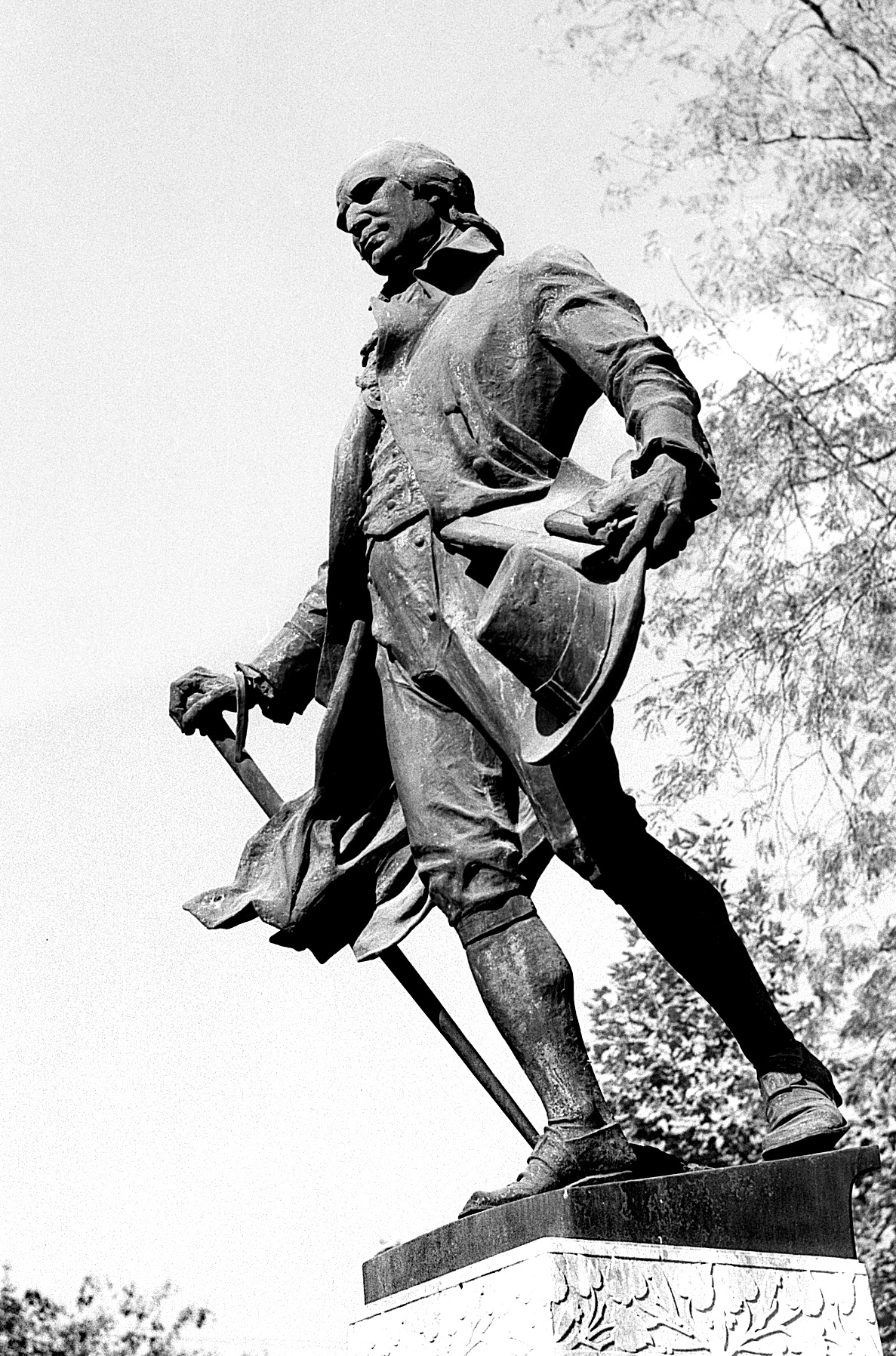

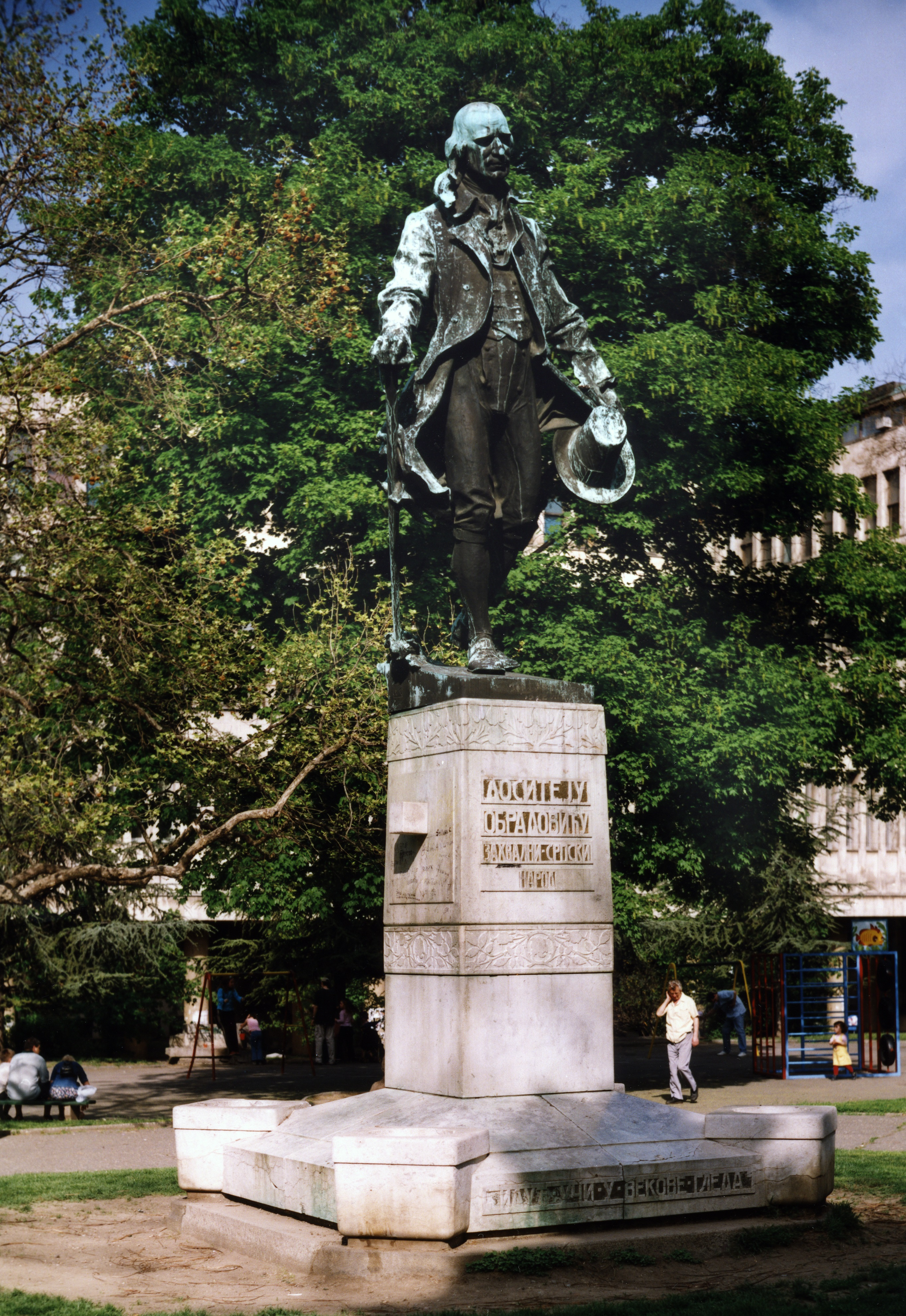

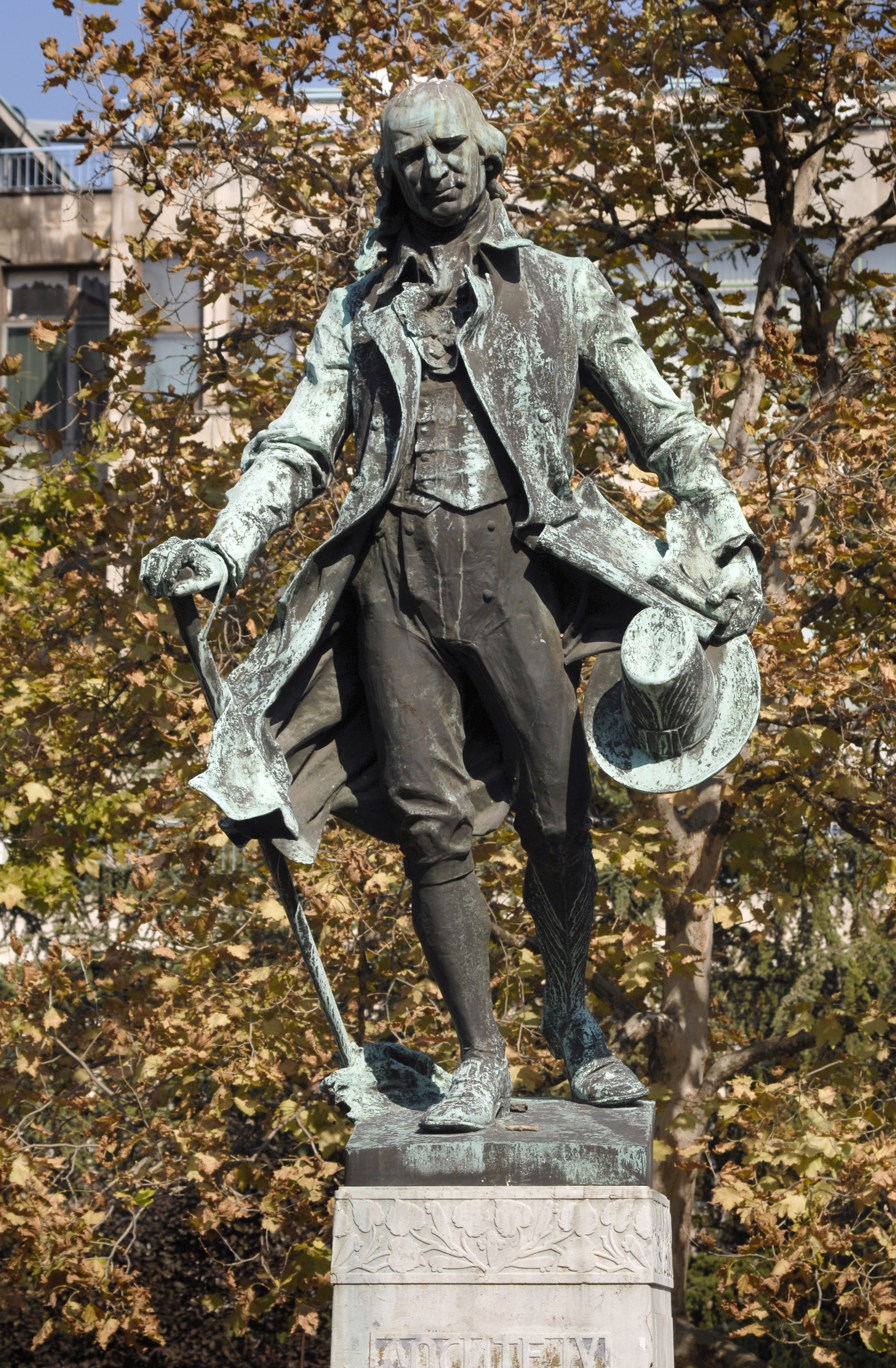
