= Academic Park =

Protected area in Belgrade, Serbia

- (Serbian: Академски парк, Akademski park)
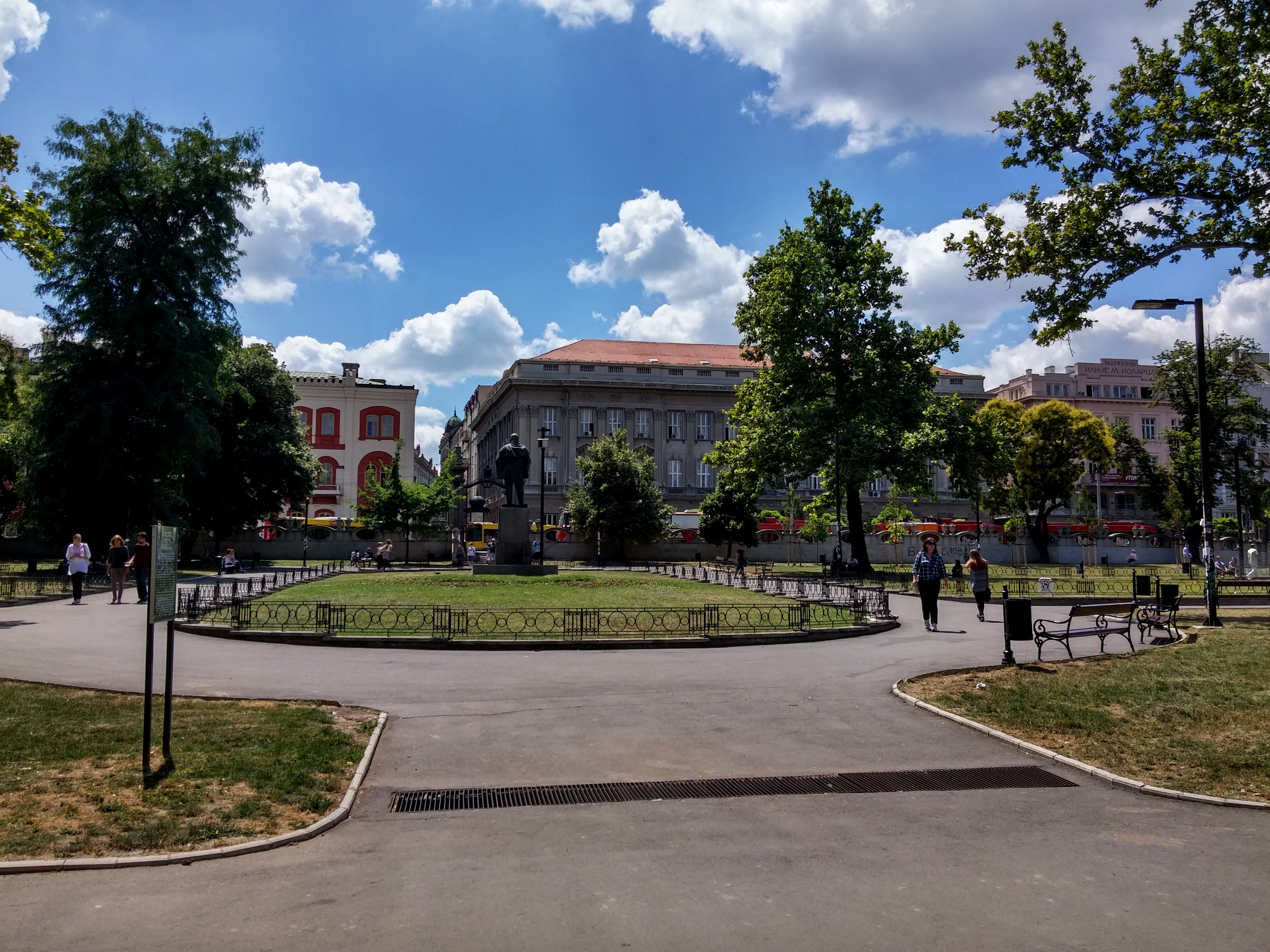
- Interactive map of Academic Park
- Location: Stari Grad, Belgrade Serbia
- Nearest city: Belgrade
- Coordinates: 44°49′10″N 20°27′29″E
- Area: 1.45 ha (3.6 acres)
- Established: 1889 (as Little Park); 11 May 1897 (official)
- Website: Academic Park

Academic Park (Serbian Cyrillic: Академски парк, romanized: Akademski park) is a park in Belgrade, the capital of Serbia. It is situated in the neighborhood of Studentski Trg, in the downtown. It is located in Belgrade's municipality of Stari Grad. Built from 1886 to 1889, Academic Park is one of the oldest parks in Belgrade.

== Location ==
Academic Park is located halfway between the Republic Square (to the east) and the Belgrade Fortress (to the west). It is completely encircled by Studentski Trg, which is effectively turned into the four streets around the park.

== Names ==
When formed, the park was called "Little Park" (Mali park) and later was renamed to "Pančić's Park" (Pančićev park). Today, it is officially named Academic Park, but colloquially it is also called "University Park" (Univerzitetski park) and "Students' Park" (Studentski park).

== History ==
=== Roman period ===
Northern section of the park was excavated in 1968 in the project of building a furnace oil tank for the boiler room of the Belgrade's City Committee of the League of Communists located nearby. Under the lawn, the remnants of the ancient Roman thermae were discovered, including the frigidarium (room with the cold water), laconicum (room with the warm water where people would sweat and prepare) and caldarium (room with the two pools of hot water). The site became an archaeological dig in 1969 and 8 rooms in total were discovered, including the remains of the brick furnace which heated the water. It was a public unisex bath dated to 3rd or 4th century. The entire area of the park is actually within the borders of the "Protected zone of Roman Singidunum". It is situated in the area that used to be the civilian sector of the city, outside the fortress. The remnants were visible until 1978 and due to the lack of funds to continue excavations or to cover it with the roof or a marquee, the remains were conserved and buried again.

=== Great Market ===
Area of the park and the square surrounding it used to be a Turkish cemetery. At the beginning of the 19th century, farmers were selling goods at the entrances to the city. However, Turkish soldiers would often forcibly buy goods from them at the small prices, and then sell it themselves in the city for much higher amounts. After constant complaints from the farmers, vizier of Belgrade, after counseling with the city merchants, agreed to choose one place for the market. Market became operational in 1824. As per Serbian-Turkish agreement anyone could bring and sell goods, market quickly grew and became city's commercial center and was known as the Great Market (Serbian: Velika pijaca or Veliki pijac). Remaining, smaller part of Turkish cemetery, which was functional until the 1860s, was fenced by the local Turks to prevent further deterioration. After Turks completely withdrew from Belgrade and Serbia in 1867, the cemetery became overgrown with grass and was turned into the meadow, called "Little field" (Poljanče) by the local population.

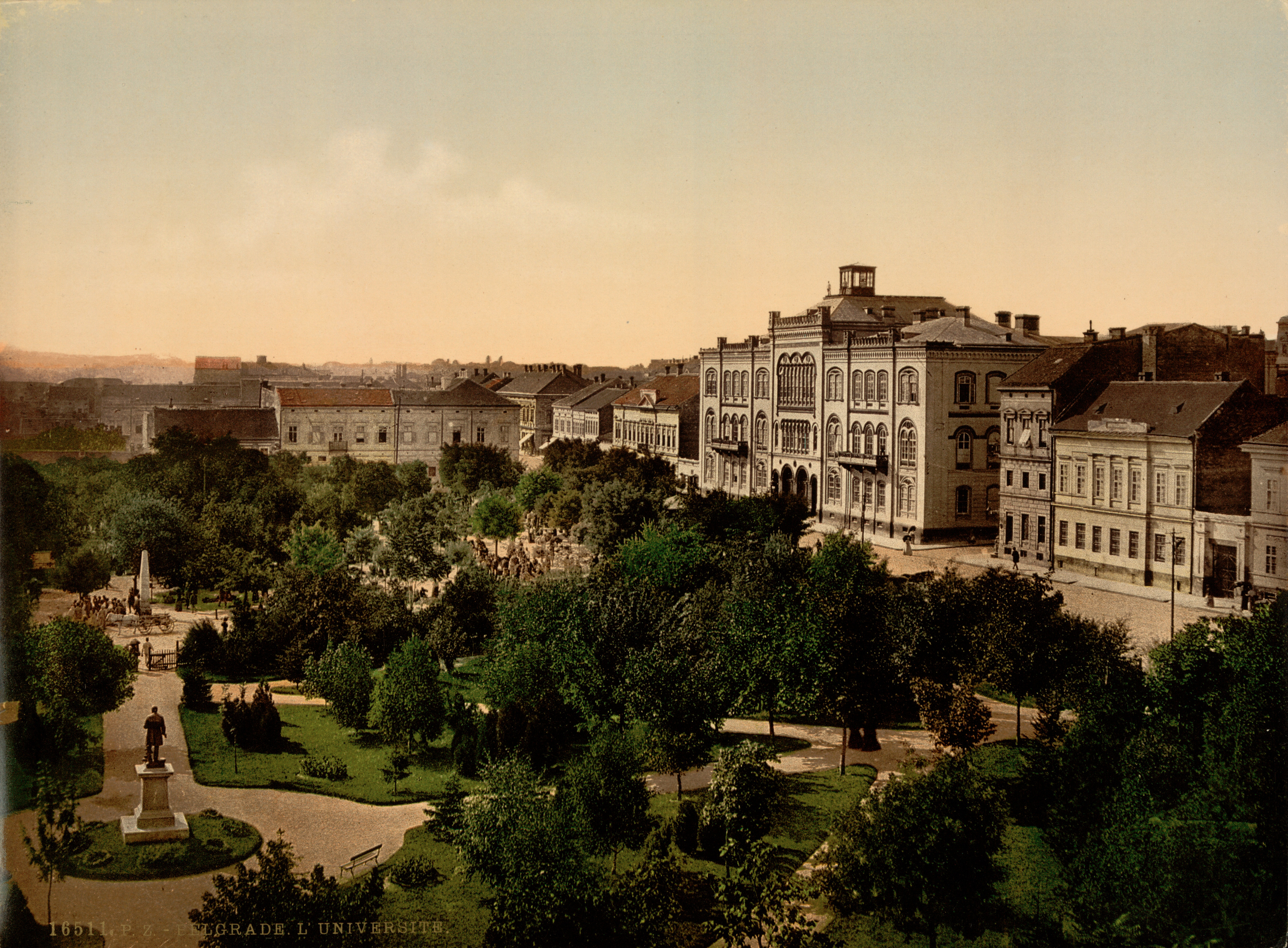
Academic Park with the Students Square and Captain Miša's Mansion, 1890

=== Park ===
First modern Belgrade's urbanist Emilijan Josimović suggested dislocation of the market in 1867, as it was placed in the sole center of the city, and he deemed it inappropriate for the Great School to be across the market. He envisioned the social center or pedestrian square ("piazza") in the form of the park with tall deciduous trees instead. However, when the horse-drawn tram was introduced in Belgrade 1892, as it passed through this part of the city, the market actually bloomed even more. Josimović met with much resistance and only some time before his death, he persuaded city government to decide to split the market in two and to form a park in one of the sections. The open space area around the market, which was now a defunct Turkish cemetery, and the northwestern section were turned into the park, as Josimović originally envisioned. He also proposed for the nearby buffer zone between the city and the Fortress to be adapted into the Kalemegdan Park, as he considered parks the "air reservoirs". Some parts of the original park were constructed from the spring of 1886 to 1889, which was named Little Park.

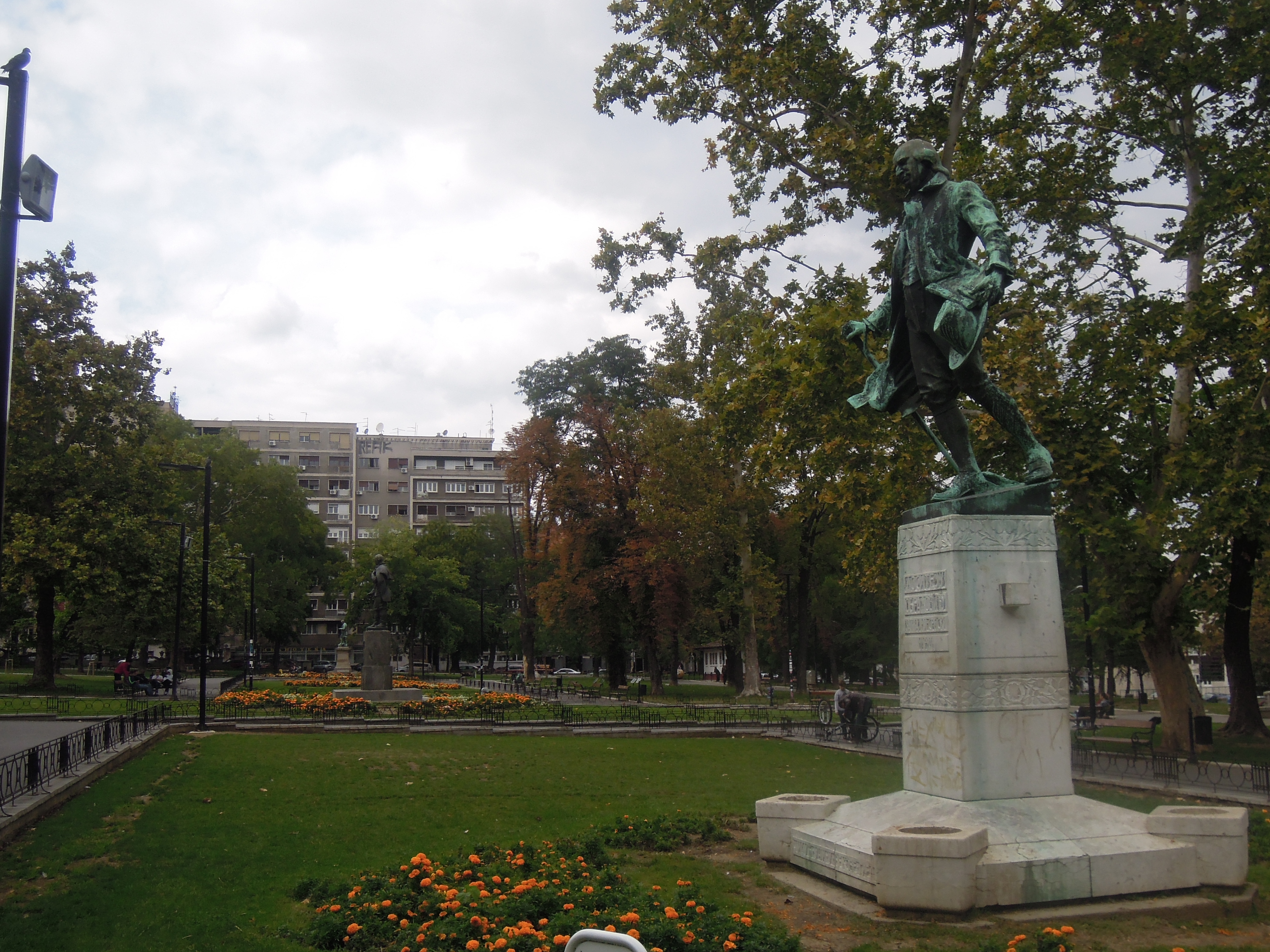
Monument to Dositej Obradović in Park

The park was officially opened on 11 May 1897, just two weeks before Josimović's death. On the same day, the monument to Josif Pančić, work of sculptor Đorđe Jovanović was erected in the park. As the monument was covered with cloth for a long time, citizens colloquially nicknamed the square a "plateau of the bagged man". The Pančić monument was the first such monument in Belgrade, and the park was soon renamed to Pančič's Park.

The market continued to operate until 1926 when was finally closed and its area was used to enlarge the Pančič's Park in 1927, when the present square was finally formed, with the park in the central part. The project was done by Đorđe Kovalevski. In 1929, the stone ornamental fence with the massive gates made of wrought iron was built around the park, projected by Milutin Borisavljević. It was projected in the style of Classicism with Neo-Baroqe and Rococo motives. The fence and the gates cost seven time more than the construction of the enlarged park itself two years ago. The fence has 74 decorative oval alcoves with ornamental wrought iron flower ornaments. It also has 176 decorative amphora-shaped vases, ornamented with the motives of ram heads and garlands. The fence and the ornaments are made of reinforced concrete with artificial stone covering. In 1930, the monument to Dositej Obradović (work of Rudolf Valdec) was transferred to the park from his previous location at the end of the Knez Mihailova street, where it was unveiled in 1914. A monument to Jovan Cvijić, sculptured by Oto Logo, was dedicated in 1994.

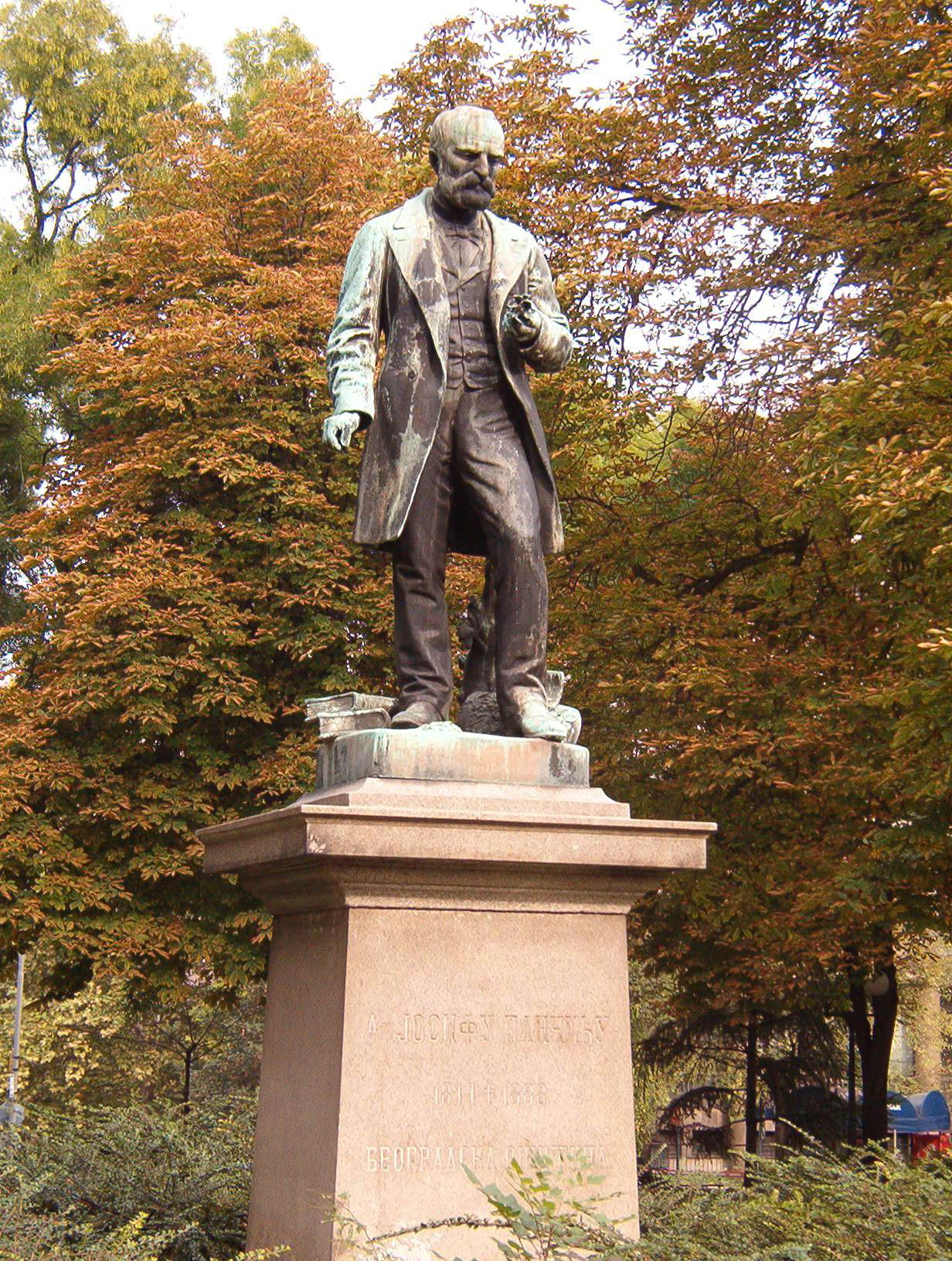
Monument to Josif Pančić

In 1943, as part of the strategic bombing campaign within the scopes of the oil campaign against Nazi Germany, the U.S. began massive bombardment of the oil fields and refineries in Romania, known as the Operation Tidal Wave campaign. On their return, as Belgrade was important strategic point, the bombers threw their unused bombs on the city. German occupational forces dug several pools across the city to storage water for extinguishing the fires. One of such pools was built in the center of the park. In time, citizens began to use the pools for swimming and the Germans didn't try to stop them so they became sort of public swimming pools. The pools were ultimately re-filled by 1950.

== Characteristics ==
The park covers an area of 1.45 hectares (3.6 acres). In 2007 it was protected and declared the natural monument.

In 2008, two species of bats lived in the park.

Surrounding area is location of many educational and cultural institutions, thus the names (Academic/Students Park). They include:

- Rectorate of the University of Belgrade in the representative Captain Miša's Mansion;
- Faculty for Natural Sciences and Mathematics ( University of Belgrade);
- University of Belgrade Faculty of Philosophy;
- University of Belgrade Faculty of Philology;
- Kolarac Public University, with concert hall;
- Ethnographic museum;
- A monument to Petar II Petrović Njegoš;

== Reconstructions ==
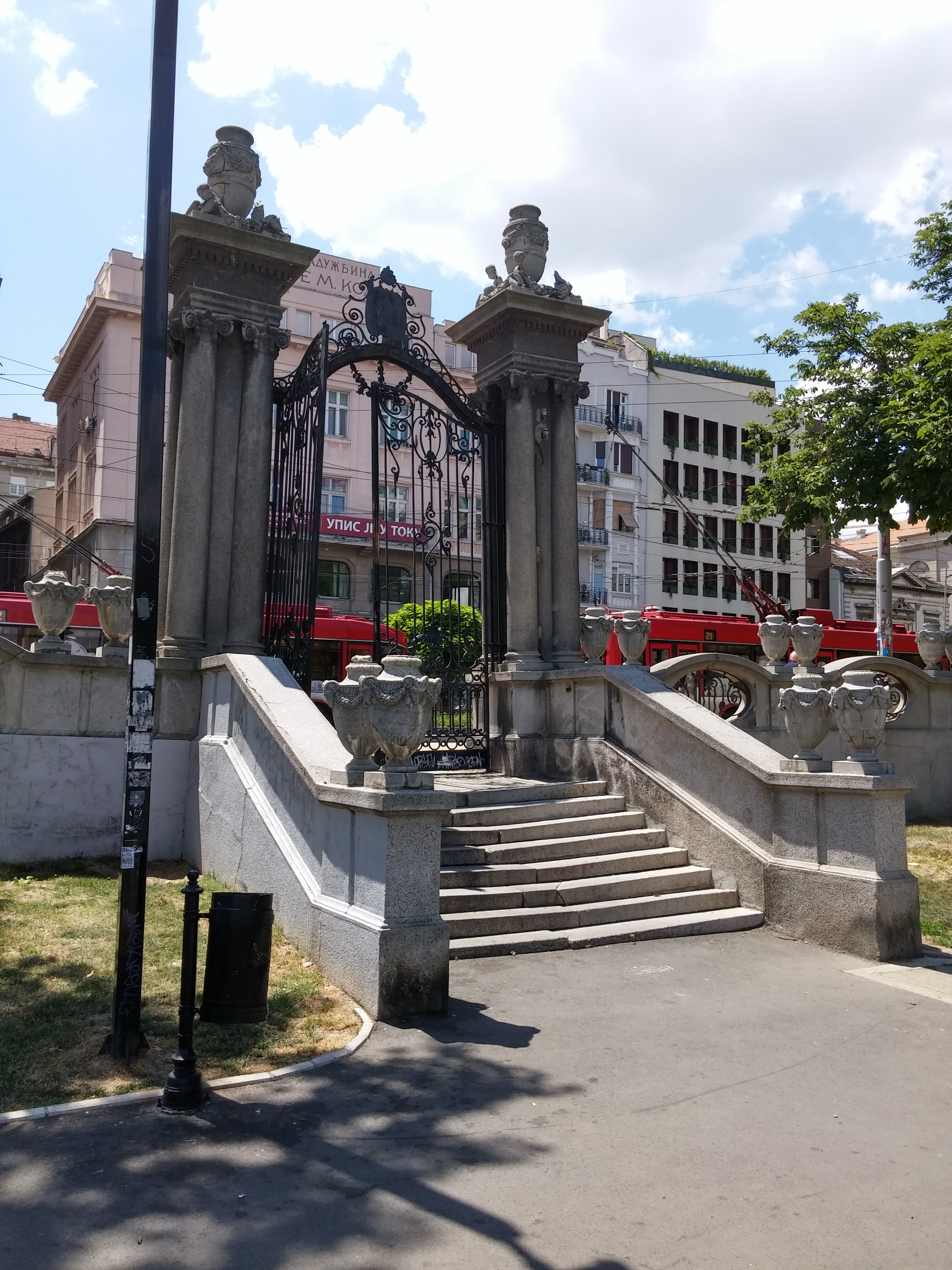
Gate

A detailed project of park's repair was done in 1989 but was never conducted. It was renovated in 2009 (when the new fence on the north side was built and the new seedlings were planted), 2011-2012 and 2015. New plane trees, Callery pears and photinias were planted and three flower rondelles were restored around the three monuments (Pančić, Obradović, Cvijić).

By 2020, the fence deteriorated a lot. The entire fence is built on the embankment as the continual wall which causes static instability. As the pressure is the strongest where the massive gates are, one of the gates was permanently closed due to the terrain settling which caused the shifting of the axis of the columns which hold the gate. Also due to the settlement, structural cracks developed in the ornamented wall, but also because it has no interruption in its design so the construction can't "work". Out of 74 alcove, 15 had no iron ornaments anymore, while almost all amphorae were either damaged or completely destroyed. In February 2020, the Institute for the Protection of Cultural Monuments drafted the project of static restoration, which includes reconstruction of all damaged or missing plastics.
