= Monument to Josif Pančić =

1897 statue by Đorđe Jovanović

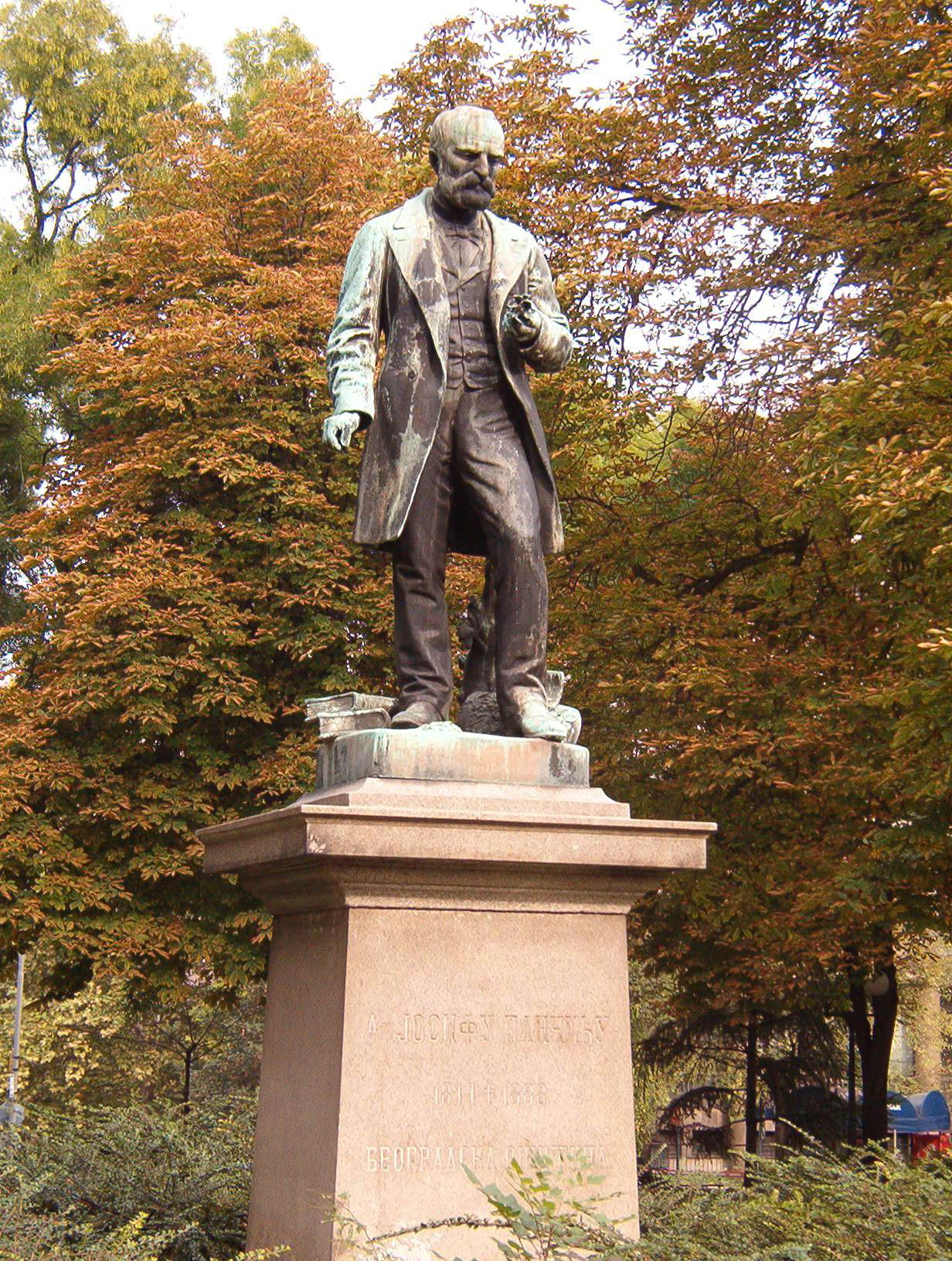
- Interactive map of Monument to Josif Pančić
- Location: Belgrade, Serbia
- Coordinates: 44.8197°N 20.4575°E
- Opening date: 1897
- Dedicated to: Josif Pančić

Monument to Josif Pančić was erected in Belgrade in the memory of Јоsif Pančić (1814–1888), a Serbian doctor, scientist, botanist and the first president of Serbian Royal Academy. The monument is located in the Academy Park and has the status of the cultural monument. The monument was erected in 1897, as the work of the sculptor Đorđe Jovanović, one of the first local educated sculptors.

== History of the erection of the monument ==
Shortly after the death of the distinguished scientist Josif Pančić in 1888, the Ministry of Education hired the academic sculptor Đorđe Jovanović, to make the sculpture. Until spring in 1891, Pančić's sculpture was designed and cast. However, when the Ministry of Education was supposed to take over the sculpture of Josif Pančić, they started to stall and protest. The Artistic Department of the Serbian Academy of Science and Arts gave negative opinion about the monument, considering that the „sculpture had no artistic values at all“. The Ministry of Education, obviously encouraged by the negative assessment of the Academy Department, informed the artist that there was not enough money for the repurchase of the statue, and that they are not able to compensate for the expenses he had considering the casting of the statue in bronze. Regarding these events, a group of our students in Paris, led by Bogdan Popović, wrote a letter to the Professors` Council of the Great School, as the plea and the appeal to find the solution to that situation. Finally, the monument was erected within the Academic Park (former King Square or Great Square) and was solemnly unveiled in May 1897. The important guests were present at the ceremony of unveiling, the King of Serbia with the members of Royal Government and state council, the members of the Serbian Royal Academy of Science, diplomatic representative of the Principality of Bulgaria, as well as Nikola Pašić, the president of the Municipality of Belgrade at that time. The Municipality of Belgrade paid covered the expenses of the erection of the monument.

== The monument ==
A bronze sculpture (220 cm high) represents Pančić standing, with one foot forward, holding a magnifying glass and a twig in his hands, whereas by his feet there are books and a famous Pančić's pine tree. To the right from the bronze pedestal there is a sculptor's signature and the year of construction: Đ. JOVANOVIĆ 1891. Quadrangular pedestal was made of light-grey stone and is 223 cm high. There is the inscription on the pedestal: TO JOSIF PANČIĆ 1814–1888 BELGRADE MUNICIPALITY. The sculpture of Josif Pančić holds an important place in the development of our sculpture, especially considering Belgrade public monuments. It is the first sculpture in Serbian sculpture designed and done by the Serbian artist, one of the first public monuments in Belgrade at the beginning of the development of sculpture art in Serbia in the period of academism. The monument was displayed at the autumn salon in Paris in 1891. It is the first public monument done in full figure, as the work of a local artist.

The Monument to Josif Pančić was declared a cultural monument in 1967.
