= Skadarlija =

Urban neighbourhood in Belgrade

Skadarlija Скадарлија
- Urban neighbourhood
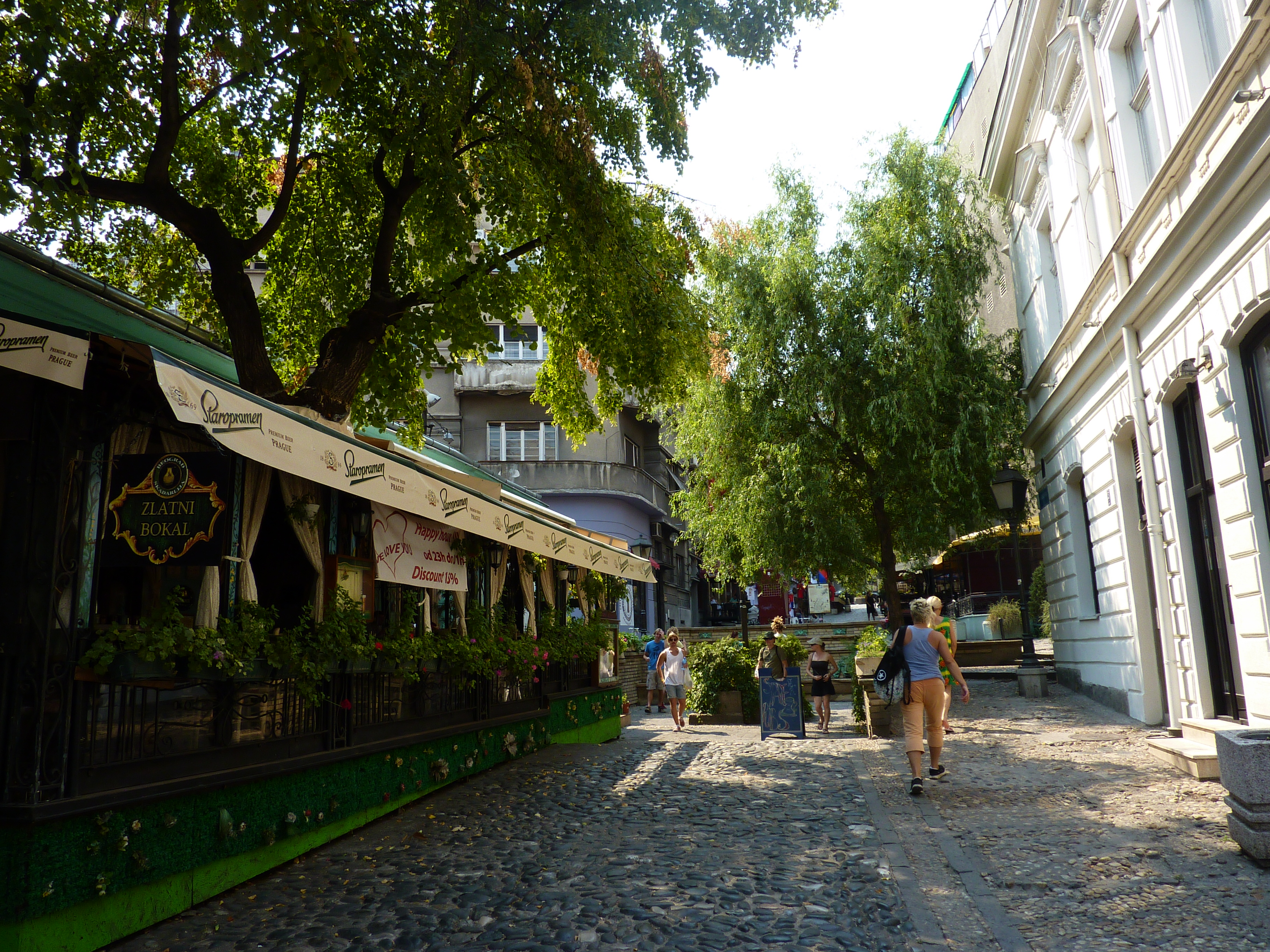
- Street in Skadarlija

- Location within Belgrade
- Coordinates: 44.8178°N 20.4643°E
- Country: Serbia
- Region: Belgrade
- Municipality: Stari Grad
- Time zone: UTC+1 (CET)
  - Summer (DST): UTC+2 (CEST)
- Area code: +381(0)11
- Car plates: BG

Skadarlija (Serbian Cyrillic: Скадарлија) is a vintage street, an urban neighborhood and former municipality of Belgrade, Serbia, located in the Belgrade municipality of Stari Grad (Old Town). Skadarlija partially preserves the ambience of traditional urban architecture, including archaic urban organization, and is known as the main bohemian quarter of Belgrade, similar to Montmartre in Paris. Since 1967, Skadarlija has been protected by law as a spatial cultural-historical unit.

After Kalemegdan, Skadarlija is the second-most visited tourist attraction in Belgrade, contributing a third of the city's foreign-currency income.

== Location ==
Skadarlija is located less than 300 metres (330 yd) north-west of Terazije, central Belgrade. It begins right below the Republic Square and stretches along the short, winding Skadarska Street and the surroundings streets of Zetska and Cetinjska. One of the most famous streets in Belgrade, Skadarska is less than 400 metres (440 yd) long. It connects the Despot Stefan Boulevard with the Dušanova Street, near the Bajloni open greenmarket and the Mira Trailović Square, where it extends into the neighborhood of Dorćol. Neighborhoods of Kopitareva Gradina and Jevremovac are to the east.

Though today the term is mostly applied to the street only, Skadarlija is a former municipality of Belgrade and a wider quarter which includes some 20 neighboring streets.

== Administration ==
Skadarlija became a separate municipality of Belgrade in 1952, after the previous post-World War II division of Belgrade into raions from 1945 to 1952 ended. That municipality included a large portion of urban Belgrade, mainly the Danube oriented neighborhoods like Dorćol, Jalija, Stari Grad, etc. By the 1953 census, municipality of Skadarlija had a population of 31,281. On 1 January 1957 it merged into the new municipality of Stari Grad and Skadarlija became a "local community" (mesna zajednica), sub-municipal administrative unit, within the municipality. According to the censuses, the local community of Skadarlija had a population of 7,399 in 1981, 7,074 in 1991 and 5,942 in 2002. Municipality of Stari Grad later abolished local communities.

== History ==
=== Origin ===
First houses in the vicinity of the area were built in c.1717. The area was mostly empty heath, stretching between the city's outer gates and the village of Palilula. First settlement in the zone of the modern street was recorded c.1825. This area, the Danube slope, unlike the Sava slope where Savamala is located, was settled spontaneously. The proper history of Skadarlija began in 1830 with the settlement of Gypsies in the abandoned trenches in front of the ramparts. As the expansion was not planned, the settlers buried the trench, and adapted the area, as they liked. The Serbs and the Turks began settling in 1835, building the first proper houses with gardens, so the street stretched between two gates of the Belgrade Fortress: Stambol Gate and Vidin Gate.

The 1854 town plan of Belgrade reveals that the Gypsy hovels had been replaced by brick buildings into which artisans, caterers, petty clerks and others moved. The whole locality was referred to as the Gypsy Quarter, Gypsy Alley or Šićan Mala and remained a Romani settlement until 1870. In that period, the stream called Bibijin potok ("Bibija stream"), which originates under the modern Politika building in the Makedonska Street, flowed down the alley, crossing it. The stream was named after Bibija, the Romani deity of salvation. At the time, Belgrade was divided into quarters, and the stream was an administrative border between the quarters of Palilula and Dorćol (Stari Grad). As Palilula limited the playing of music to midnight, people would then jump across the stream in the Dorćol section to continue with festivities.

An aqueduct was later constructed which conducted the stream underground, which still flows below the street. The aqueduct was essentially a wall through the center of the street, and it also conducted water to the local households from the central pump in Terazije. Still, during the heavy rains or melting of the snow, the stream would still form and flow down the middle of the street. The largest arch of the aqueduct was named Skadar, after the town (today in Albania), so in 1872 the street was named Skadarska ulica. Serbian for "Skadar street", it is still the street's official name. As of 2018, Skadarska is among only 29 streets in Belgrade which never changed their names since the first naming of the city streets in 1872. The name was shortly changed to Ružina Street, though, during World War I by the occupational Austro-Hungarian administration, but never by the Belgrade administration. 1872 is also the year when a "modern" urban development of the street began, because this is when the first urban plans for the streets were made.

=== Bohemian quarter ===
Soon after the aqueduct was built, the first khans were built along the foothill of the wall. They were the precursors of later kafanas. Skadarlija began to acquire its bohemian character in the last few decades of the 19th century, and particularly after 1901, when the well-known Dardaneli inn, located where the National Museum in Belgrade is today, was demolished and its guests, prominent writers and actors, moved to the Skadarlija inns or kafanas. In the early 20th century there were 15 kafanas in Skadarlija, including: Tri šešira ("Three Hats"), Dva jelena ("Two Deer"), Zlatni bokal ("The Golden Chalice"), Bandist, East, Guild, Vuk Karadžić, Bums keler, Miloš Obilić and The two Sergeants, Mala Pijaca ("Little Greenmarket"). The first three of these still survive today, accompanied by some new restaurants like Ima dana ("There will be days"), Skadarlija (demolished in 2006), Dva bela goluba ("Two White Doves"). In the late 19the century, the beginning of the street was a location of "Pašonin bulevar", the very first Belgrade's music hall.

As of 2022, the Tri šešira, founded in 1864, is the oldest, still operational kafana in Skadarlija and second overall in Belgrade, after the ?. With other kafanas being closed or relocated to Skadarlija, and closing of the most popular "Velika Srbija" inn in 1905 to make place for the Hotel Moskva in Terazije, by c.1910 Skadarlija became to central point of Belgrade's bohemianism.

The end section of Skadarlija is known as the Skadarlija atrium. It is mostly occupied by the brewery that belonged to one of the most distinguished Belgrade families before World War II, the Czech-originating Bajloni family. The brewery was originally established in 1850 by Filip Đorđević. He previously purchased the equipment from the failed brewery of Czech migrant and miller expert Johan Weinhappl founded in 1839, and installed it in the ending section of the Cetinjska Street, which forms the atrium with Skadarlija. The manually operated brewery became known as Little Brewery, to distinguish it from the Big Brewery, opened by the royal family in Savamala in 1840. It was purchased by the Bajloni family in 1880, who introduced the steam machines.

It produced "Aleksandar" beer, made from thermal waters that spring out in the brewery's backyard. When Bajloni began digging for the foundations of his brewery in 1892, he discovered the bones of the mammoths and skulls of the Neanderthal Krapina man, who was jokingly nicknamed in the press of the day "the first Belgrader". During the German-Austrian occupation in World War I, the skull disappeared. The well is located 80 to 300 meters (260 to 980 ft) under the surface. After 1945, the brewery became part of the "BIP" brewery, but was later closed. The spring water was bottled for drinking until the early 2000s. Under the brewery is a complex of lagums (subterranean galleries or catacombes), which were used as a storage rooms for the beer barrels. By 2008, the entire inner complex is abandoned and slated for demolition. However, as the project of massive reconstruction failed, the brewery became home for many coffeehouses and clubs.

The houses in the street were small, with mud plastered walls and roofs covered with flat tiles (ćeramida). The houses had small yards with gardens and water taps and wooden, plank fences (taraba). Only occasional houses had a porch. By the 1930s, many survived while smaller number of houses was demolished and the new buildings were built instead. The street itself was paved with the rough, lumpy cobblestones.

=== 20th-century revitalization ===
By the end of World War II, Skadarlija was in bad shape. At one point, not counting two buffets at the beginning and the end of the street, "Split" and "Skadar", only three kafanas survived: "(Velika) Skadarlija", "Dva jelena" and "Tri šešira". Other venues were closed due to the nationalization, lack of professional staff, rationed food and drinks, and the general state of adversity after the war. State organized "administrative provisioning" for kafanas, in case of Skadarlija and the entire Belgrade's First Raion (modern Stari Grad municipality), from the central storage facility in the Vlajkovićeva Street. Thus, even those kafanas which worked, had no permanent menus, as they never knew what groceries will be delivered. After the first signs of economic recovery, Hospitality Secretariat of the First Raion decided to revitalize Skadarlija's kafanas in 1952. Works started first in "Skadarlija" in 1953, which was reopened on 31 December 1953. New Year's Eve celebration was attended by the members of the new, Communist elite, including president Josip Broz Tito and the first lady Jovanka Broz.

Urban story claims that the idea of transforming the street into what it is today came in c.1957, during the mulled beer drinking contest between the poet Libero Markoni, and writer and artist Zuko Džumhur in "Tri šešira". Skadarlija was protected by the law in 1967, when the decision of its reconstruction was also announced. The renovation and restoration began in 1968 in accordance with the designs made by a group of prominent artists: architect Uglješa Bogunović (head of the project), Zuko Džumhur, painter Mario Maskareli, sculptor Milica Ribnikar Bogunović, painter and writer Momo Kapor, among others. They managed to preserve its existing values and introduce modern facilities without interfering with its historical features. In the late 1960s, Skadarlija regained fame as the center of youth and bohemian artists of Belgade. Plans for further adaptations were made in 1977 but remained on paper until 2008.

Restaurant "Ima dana" was opened in 1969. One of the first modern clubs in the neighborhood was "Monokl", opened across the "Tri šešira" in the 1970s. Famous folk singer Silvana Armenulić performed at the opening. DJ was Maksa Ćatović, who was previously a disc jockey in "Cepelin" in Tašmajdan.

In 1985 theatre director Zorica Jevremović Munitić founded Children's Street Theater /Ulično dečje pozorište/ in Skadarlija. The core of the troupe was made up of Romany children who lived in Skadarlija, 'white' children' from Dorcol (a nearby prestigious Belgrade neighborhood), Romany children from the favelas of the Belgrade suburb of Mirijevo (who sell flowers in Skadarlija), professional actors and painters who live in Skadarlija, a Skadarlija fortune-teller, clowns, fire eaters, and alternative artists (musicians, painters).

The house of Đura Jakšić, a well-known writer and painter who lived and died in Skadarlija, has been turned into a meeting place for the poets participating in the Skadarlija Evenings event, after it was fully renovated in 1986. It became the cultural center of the quarter.

=== 21st century ===
In February 2008, plans were announced for the complete reconstruction of the lowest section of Skadarlija (Skadarlija atrium, an area of about 1.5 hectares (3.7 acres)) bounded by the streets of Skadarska, Zetska, Cetinjska and Dušanova. Works are scheduled to begin in September 2008 and due to be finished by December 2010. A new multi-functional center will include two hotels, subterranean garage, restaurants, museum and a new pedestrian zone comprising a wide promenade between the Skadarska and Cetinjska streets. The restaurant Stara Skadarlija, two authentic walls of the brewery, the old tower and shopping mall, boiler room and lagums will be preserved but with additional functions. The tower will be illuminated and visible from the city neighborhoods below. The shopping mall's higher floors will be turned into a hotel. Lagums will be open for the public and turned into souvenir and gift shops. The atrium will be turned into a new commercial shopping mall and a hotel with subterranean garage of 1,000 parking spaces. Water springs will be co-opted and protected, and new drills will be added to the existing three springs, as a sort of a tourist attraction. The most controversial aspect at the moment appears to be the concept of a glass box-shaped membrane, lit from the inside, which is supposed to engulf the Stara Skadarlija restaurant. The idea is opposed by the local population.

Except for Stara Skadarlija, changes will mainly occur in the side from the Cetinjska street which is considered a low preservation urban area, unlike the Skadarlija side, which is protected by the law and no new construction works will be allowed. As the altitude difference from top to bottom of the projected area is 17 metres (56 ft), it is de facto going to be step-like dug into the ground for almost three floors. The project was scrapped in the later years due to the unsolved property ownership issues, as the BIP sold the brewery to the Italian company "Star Immobiliare" in 2006 which in turn sold it to the British "Invest Balkan Properties PLC" in 2007. Company "Elgin" acquired the building in 2010. They claimed that by the end of 2011, they will announce which of the world-famous hotel chains will build a hotel but nothing happened.

=== 2017–2021 reconstruction ===
Instead, reconstruction of the street was announced by the city government in October 2016, as the cobblestones and the façades became damaged in time. Works were scheduled for the spring of 2017, but were moved to October 2017, as the city decided to accept the proposition of the kafana owners to postpone it until after the touristic season is over. However, they decided to renovate the drinking fountain, which was to be finished in July 2017. As the fountain is at the beginning of the street, the tourists routinely avoid the street thinking it is completely closed, while those who enter the restaurants' terraces and gardens often leave as the dust is everywhere, especially in the initial section of the street. The number of visitors dwindled and the restaurateurs accused the city administration of "ruining the 2017 season". The fountain was restored according to the original 1966 project of Bogunović and Ribnikar, and the works were finished on 7 July 2017, 10 days ahead of the schedule. The stone fountain, which was built on the location of an old, one-pipe fountain from the Ottoman period, was fully renovated and the stone bench made of the yellow Ljig sandstone, which was projected in 1966, was finally built. Further reconstruction began on 16 October 2017 and was projected to last until the spring of 2018.

In November 2017 photos appeared showing that the trademark stone kaldrma has been removed and that street was paved with the asphalt concrete. It prompted a major public outburst and protests, so the city authorities explained that the asphalt is just the substrate and that stones will be washed and placed on top of the asphalt. As the works were under the tougher public scrutiny since then, it was obvious that the old stone was replaced with the new, imported one, produced in Greece in 2016. City then announced that the old and new stones will be mixed, but instead of a colorful stones of the old kaldrma, the new one is uniformly gray, described as the "dark shroud, in contrast to the previous playful and diverse one, which took [from Skadarlija] its joy and vibrancy and killed its Dionysian spirit". In the lower half, which was done by December, only the new stones were used. The customs paper show that the stone was imported only after the asphalt pavement was finished and public protests.

The reconstruction was halted again in the spring of 2018 because of the opening of the touristic season, and was continued in October 2018. Deadline for this phase was mid-December 2018, but when deadline approached, it was obvious that the works are not going to be finished. Despite holiday season, the works left majority of the quarter even without the basic, street lights. Additionally, works on almost all cross streets began in April and were to be finished by October, but that wasn't finished either, so the association of the local restaurant and café owners again reported declining income due to the dug streets. They negotiated with the city administration a temporary halt of the works during winter holidays.

By September 2019, less than a year since the works were finished, the street was clearly disintegrating, showing the low quality of works and imported Greek stone. After both traditional and social media reported this, despite deputy mayor Goran Vesić stated in March 2018 that the final, third phase starts in October 2018, city now claims that the entire reconstruction will have phases 4 and 5, though they were not mentioned before and nothing is known about them. The works were never finished and by December 2020 the street deteriorated even more, including the newly renovated parts, and was described as the "extreme sports training ground". The street was dug out again in January 2021, with claims that this is the ending phase, which will be finished by May/June 2021. By this time, journalists reported it is unknown what was planned, how much has been done, what was included later, how many "final phases" there are, and that there is no end in the foreseeable future. Daily Politika's journalist and Belgrade chronicler Milan Janković ironically wrote: Please stop, we beg you. Leave Skadarlija to be ugly and unacceptable as it has always been, because since you started to "fix" it, it is much worse. Or the Skadarlija experiment will continue?

In October 2021, city's monuments commission adopted a motion to build a monument to singer Toma Zdravković, at No. 26. The motion, proposed by Rasim Ljajić, was accepted by the city assembly on 20 June 2023, but at No. 28. The lifesize monument, sculptured by Katarina Tripković, was ceremonially unveiled on 2 October 2023 by Ljajić and mayor Aleksandar Šapić.

== Characteristics ==
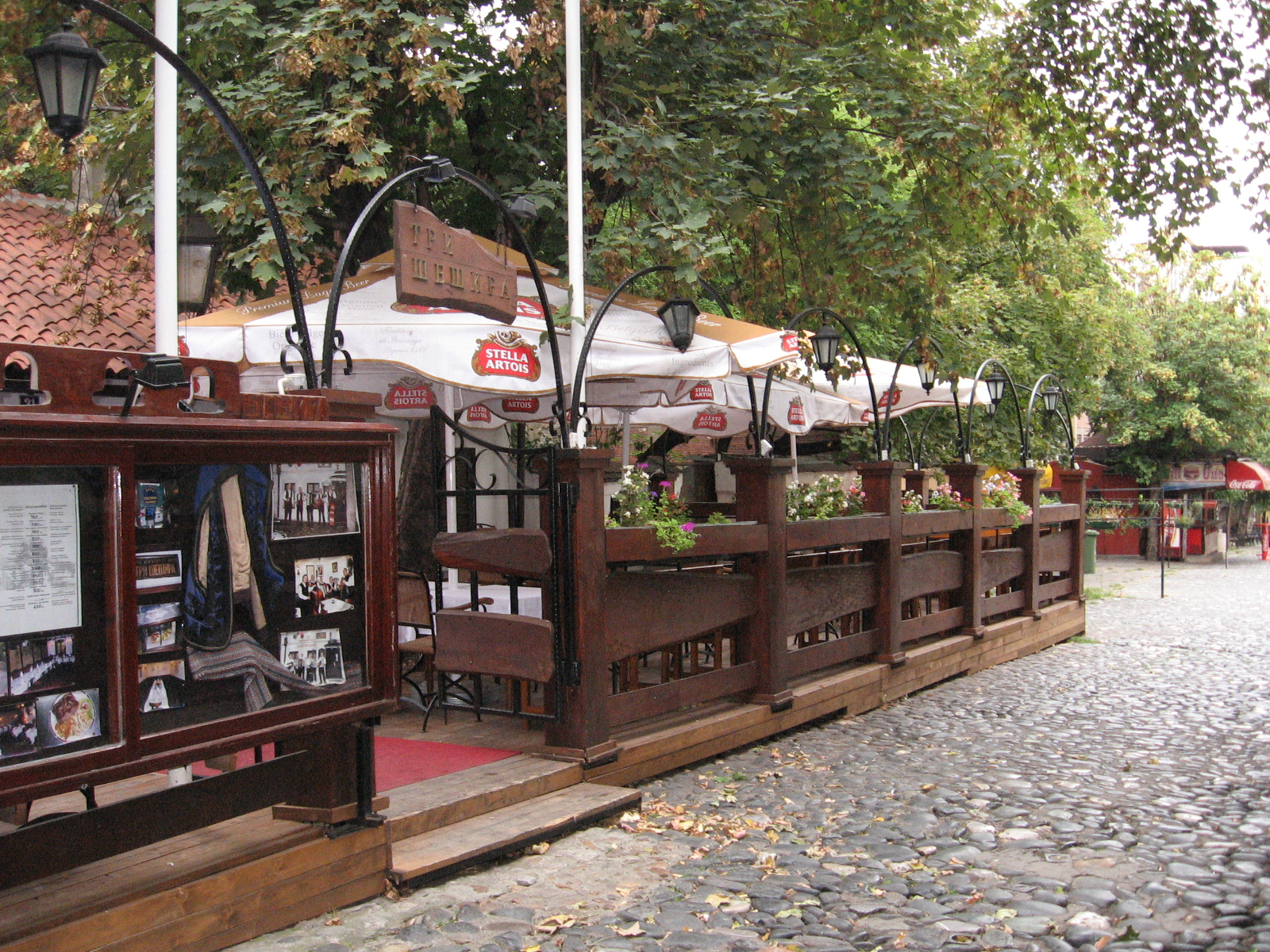
Tri šešira restaurant

The present Skadarlija, a short and curved street, is a Belgrade tourist attraction. It includes restaurants, hotels (e.g. Le Petit Piaf), art galleries, antique and souvenir shops. At the end of the street there is the Sebilj fountain. It is an ornamented drinking fountain, copy of the Sebilj fountain in Baščaršija in Sarajevo, and gift from Sarajevo to Belgrade.

Groups playing Serbian brass or traditional urban music and actors dressed in traditional Serb costumes perform down the street. Unlike other similar and popular places in Belgrade that are considered posh, Skadarlija is known as a place visited by young couples and entire families with children. Restaurants offer the typical national cuisine, most notably the roštilj (grilled meat) with pivo (beer). Skadarlija's cafés, restaurants, art exhibits and cobblestone (kaldrma) promenade attract up to 20,000 people daily. The street is a car-free zone but it would be unsuited for traffic anyway because it is too narrow and with bumpy cobblestones.

=== Bohemian life ===
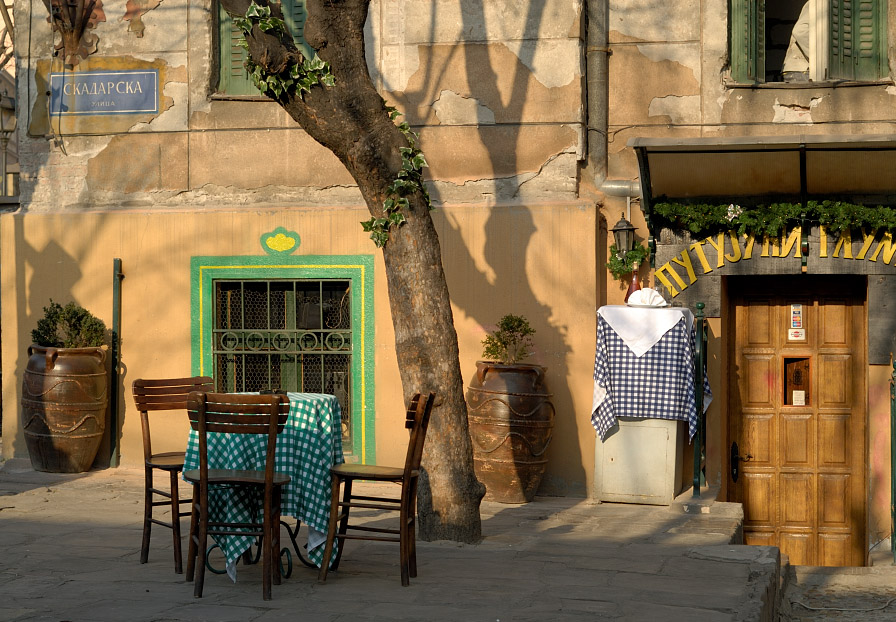
Putujući glumac restaurant along Skadarska street.

Well-known but mostly poor poets and writers became regular visitors of Skadarlija in the early 20th century, not just from Serbia but from the wider Yugoslav areas, even before the Yugoslav state was formed as such in 1918. The most prominent residents and visitors in Skadarlija's bohemian history include Đura Jakšić, Dobrica Milutinović, Žanka Stokić, Ilija Stanojević, Tin Ujević, Gustav Krklec, Stevan Sremac, Antun Gustav Matoš, Zuko Džumhur, Momo Kapor and Silvana Armenulić.

My name is Skadarlija...or Skadarska street, however you like it. I am no boulevard...or avenue...or highway. I am common steep curved alley in the middle of Belgrade. And that would be everything meaningful to be told about me if it wouldn't be for my bohemian history, my crumbling roofs, my shaking chairs...

— Zuko Džumhur

After decades of performing in Skadarlija's restaurants and outdoors, some singers and performers became synonymous with Skadarlija: singers Šaban Šaulić, Toma Zdravković, Olga Jančevecka, Divna Đokić, Mila Matić, actress Ljubica Janićijević who impersonated Gypsy fortune-tellers, Radomir Šobota as a drummer, and especially Sofka Nikolić. Nikolić, the first folk music star of newly formed Yugoslavia in the 1920s and 1930s, published dozens of records, becoming one of the most commercial female singers in Europe. Musicians from Europe and United States were visiting her in Skadarlija, including Josephine Baker, who befriended her. Called "Queen of Skadarlija", Nikolić withdrew in 1939 when her young daughter, her only child, passed away.

Restaurants are proud of their lists of worldwide celebrities and epicureans who visited them over the decades. Even Alfred Hitchcock ended his diet in Skadarlija. Often, they post photographs of their visits on the walls. For example, over the years, Tri šešira welcomed numerous famous guests such as guitarist Jimi Hendrix, politicians George H. W. Bush, Josip Broz Tito, King Juan Carlos I of Spain, Sandro Pertini, and chess player Anatoly Karpov. Other celebrities who visited Skadarlija include queen Elizabeth II, politicians Willy Brandt, Gianni de Michelis, Helmut Kohl, Hans-Dietrich Genscher, Yevgeny Primakov, Igor Ivanov and Margaret Thatcher, author Alberto Moravia, actors Burt Lancaster, Vladimir Visotsky, Gina Lollobrigida, Alain Delon, film director Nikita Mikhalkov, etc. Visitors from the later period include Joe Biden and Johannes Hahn.

As similar bohemian quarters, Skadarlija and Parisian Montmartre twinned on 22 October 1977. A group of French artists visited Belgrade to mark the occasion. They were joined by large crowds of Belgraders, and they formed a joint procession which walked from the Monument of Gratitude to France in Kalemegdan Park, through Knez Mihailova Street and Republic Square, to Skadarlija. The photos of the event are kept in the archive of the Serbian Academy of Sciences and Arts. Two identical plaques, commemorating the event, are placed in May 1978. In Montmartre, the plaque is placed on the building of the Free Commune of Montmartre while artist Branimir Bane Minić, who authored the plaque, was dubbed the Knight of Montmartre. In Belgrade, the plaque is placed across the house of Đura Jakšić.

Since 1993, the official opening of the summer season in Skadarlija (restaurants are open the entire year) has been marked by rising a "bohemian flag". The flagpole is located in front of the Zlatni bokal restaurant. The ceremony is always attended by celebrities, including popular and opera singers, actors, and artists. The season usually begins in the late April/early May.

There is a special code of conduct for the restaurants and their employees. The code was rescinded in 1975 but was reintroduced in 2010. It includes the types of dishes that can be found on the menues, what types of uniforms, table clothes or music are allowed and the knowledge of foreign languages.

The entire season consists of a series of festivities and celebrations: Summer Saint Nicholas Feast, Skadarlija Fest, Flower Festival (Festival cveća), Hat Festival (Šeširijada), Tamburica Fest, Miss Skadarlija Paegeant, children's cooking festival Varjačići (visited by Jamie Oliver), wine exhibitions, painting and poetry evenings, theatrical shows, Snail Race for choosing the slowest bicycle rider, dancing shows for the old-style dances, etc.

The symbol of Skadarlija is a Fedora-type hat. There are numerous folk songs which mention the hat, they are dedicated to it or named after it. This especially goes for the songs in the style of starogradska muzika, which is another emblematic feature of Skadarlija.

=== Farmers' market ===
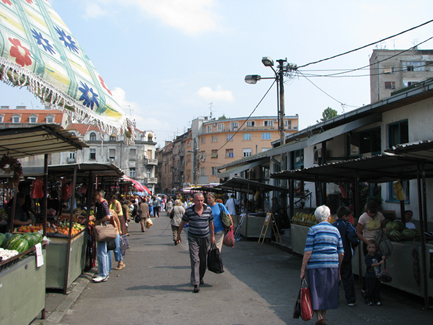
Bajloni's farmers' market, officially named Skadarlija farmers' market

At the end of the street, across the Dušanova Street, there is an open farmers market, officially named Skadarlija market. Until the 19th century it was a boggy area, where two streams, flowing down the two modern streets of Skadarlija (Bibijin potok) and Cetinjska, were bringing water from the sources close to the modern "Politika" building. The area was known at the time as Vidinsko Poljanče ("Vidin Little Field"). In time, eastern section of the Skadarlija neighborhood, along the Cetinjska Street, was urbanized. It consisted of small houses, with yards and "obligatory" lilacs.

Predating the market was a kafana "Bajlonov Kladenac" (Bajloni's water well). The market developed spontaneously in the 19th century for the customers from the lower Dorćol neighborhood, for whom the central city market, the Great Market, was too distant and uphill. It was established on an empty lot in front of the Filip's Brewery, which was later renamed to Bajloni Brewery. Due to his brewery, and a fact that he organized the draining of the marsh, after World War I the market became known as the Bajloni Market (Bajlonijeva pijaca). In 1926 the Great Market was finally closed and city founded several new markets throughout the city, further from the downtown: Zeleni Venac, Kalenić and Jovanova market. In the process, the Bajloni market was also adapted that year: it got new market stalls, a fence, quality stores for the meat, eggs and dairy products and improved hygiene. After re-opening in 1927 it originally functioned as the wholesale market, becoming a retail farmers market after World War II.

The market was demolished during the Allied Easter bombing of Belgrade on 16 April 1944. According to Ivo Andrić, who inspected the area the day after, the market and the surrounding streets were completely destroyed, with dead bodies under the rubble. It is estimated that the bomb which destroyed the market killed some 200 people. Though officially named Skadarlija market after World War II, in 1946, the citizens continued to refer to the market only as Bajloni, not accepting the new name, with many not even knowing Skadarlija is its official name. The market covers a total of 9,415 square metres (101,340 sq ft), and is estimated to providing for 100,000 citizens.

Despite being thoroughly reconstructed just few years prior, in June 2022 another complete renovation of the market was announced. The plan includes complete demolition of all structures on the market's plateau and construction of new ones. Number of stalls will be increased by 10-15%, to 400, with addition of a multi-levelled underground garage with 400 parking lots. The plan also includes a possibility that market may be partially covered. The project additionally covers the above the surface appearance of the future subway station "Skadarlija", adjoining to the market. The station was described as a "shallow one, with one mezzanine".

Citizens reacted against the ultra-modernization of the market, a remaining part of "old Belgrade which is completely dying out" in administration's attempt to build the city as "older and prettier". The project was described as the "sea of concrete" with barely any trees, and forceful creation of "something new". City administration stated that the market will be dislocated, but not before the end of 2024, when it will be returned as "modernised" and "representative". The subway station was described as "extremely important for the tourists", while the number of parking spaces was reduced to 300. The design by architects Zoran Dmitrović and Zorica Savičić anticipates the market on two levels, ban of parking in the surrounding streets of Skadarska and Đorđa Jovanovića and expansion of sidewalks and planting of avenues, and expansion of the Skadarlija tourist area to include the plateau of the market and the adjoining plateau in front of the BITEF Theatre.

== See also ==
- Nightlife in Belgrade
