= Džumhur =

Džumhur is a Bosnian surname, derived from Turkish cumhur meaning "the people", ultimately of Arabic origin. Notable people with the surname include:

- Damir Džumhur (born 1992), Bosnian tennis player
- Zuko Džumhur (1920–1989), Bosnian writer, painter, and caricaturist
