= Marko Bastać =

Serbian politician

- Марко Бастаћ
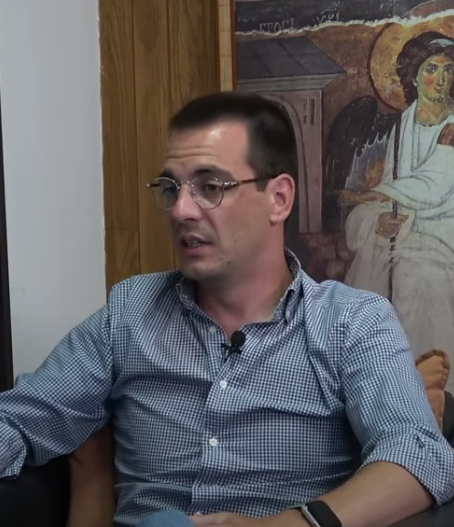
- Bastać in 2019.

President of the Stari Grad Municipality
- In office 12 May 2016 – August 2020
- Preceded by: Dejan Kovačević
- Succeeded by: Radoslav Marjanović

Personal details
- Born: 1984 (age 41–42) Belgrade, SFR Yugoslavia (now Serbia)
- Party: DS (until 2016); SSP (2019–2020)
- Education: Faculty of Contemporary Arts
- Occupation: Politician

Marko Bastać (Serbian Cyrillic: Марко Бастаћ, born 1984) is a Serbian politician who served as the president of the Stari Grad municipality from 2016 to 2020.

== Early life and career ==
He was born in 1984 in Belgrade and graduated from the Faculty of Contemporary Arts. In his youth he joined the Democratic Party and participated in many local activism projects and in 2004 he became a member of the assembly of Stari Grad. He gained work experience as an editor of shows in the production company "Emotion" from 2006 to 2009, as well as in the Government Gazette in 2009. In 2010, he became a municipal councilor and started a series of successful projects in Stari Grad.

He was the initiator of the action "Third grade students on line" in which third grade students of all schools in Stari Grad are given a netbook computer. Later he started the Volunteer Center of the municipality and participated in creating what has been called one of the best youth offices in Belgrade as well as the Contact Center which provides answers to all questions of citizens and communicates with users of numerous free programs.

He was a ballot carrier for the Democratic Party's list for the 2016 Serbian local elections called "Guardians of Stari Grad", which won the largest number of mandates in that municipality. On 12 May 2016, Bastać was elected the new president of the municipality of Stari Grad.

In December 2016, he left the Democratic Party.

In 2018, he participated in the Belgrade City Assembly election with his group of citizens "What are you doing – Marko Bastać", and finished thirteenth with 0.44% of the votes. In 2019, he joined the Party of Freedom and Justice, and has served as the president of the city board of the party until June 2020.

== Personal life ==
He is married, and has two children.
