= First Town Hospital =

Hospital in Serbia

First Town Hospital Прва варошка болница Prva varoška bolnica
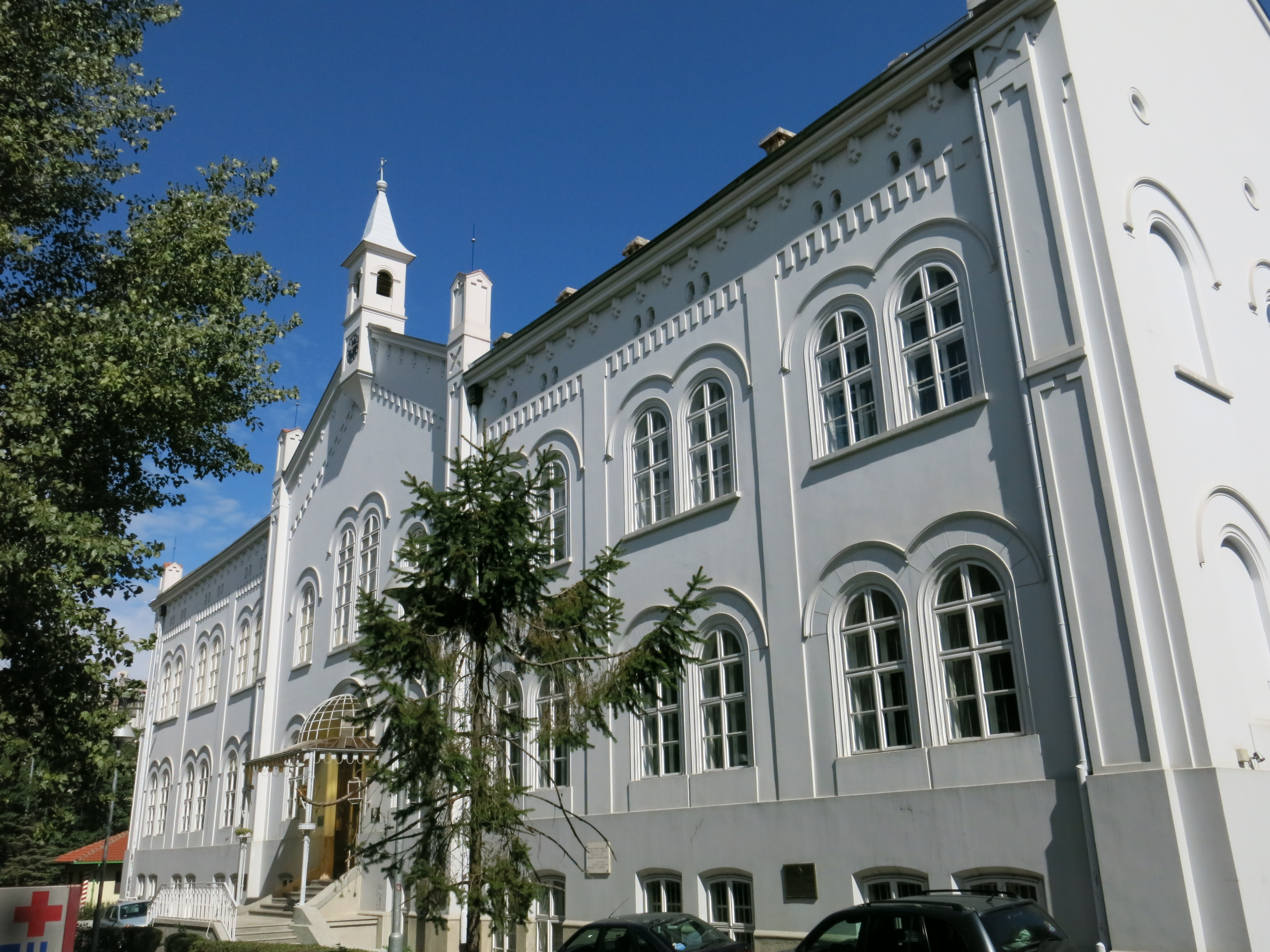
- First Town Hospital in 2013
- Interactive map of the First Town Hospital; Прва варошка болница Prva varoška bolnica area

General information
- Type: Hospital
- Location: Belgrade, Serbia
- Coordinates: 44.8164°N 20.4700°E
- Construction started: 30 June 1865
- Completed: 1 May 1868

Technical details
- Floor count: 3 above ground 1 below ground

Design and construction
- Architect: Jovan Frencl
- Developer: Prince Mihailo Obrenović
- Main contractor: Jozef Štajnlehner

The First Town Hospital (Serbian: Прва варошка болница, Prva varoška bolnica) was built in Belgrade, the capital of Serbia in 1868. The construction was initiated by the ruling prince Mihailo Obrenović as the first building in Belgrade built purposely to serve as a hospital.

With the Captain Miša's Mansion, it is the most important work of Romanticism in the architecture of Belgrade, and in general marks an excellent achievement of the Serbian architecture in the second half of the 19th century. As such, it has the status of the cultural monument of a great importance since 1979, previously protected in 1964 and categorized in 1981.

It presently houses Serbian Medical Association and the Museum of medicine.

== Location ==
The building is located in the municipality of Stari Grad, in the neighborhood of Jevremovac. It is situated at 19 Džordža Vašingtona Street, former Vidinska Street. In the vicinity of the building are several other healthcare institutes, the Jevremovac botanical garden and the neighborhood of Kopitareva Gradina.

== History ==
=== Origin ===
The first town hospital was founded in Belgrade in 1841 and for more than two decades it did not have its own building, but was located in rented houses, moving all over the town. In 1861 Prince Mihailo initiated the construction of the first proper hospital building. In order to kick-start the project, the prince personally donated his own lot, which he previously purchased from Đorđe Cenić, the Minister of Justice, for the location of the hospital. The lot was enlarged by the adjoining one, which was donated by the benefactor Ilija Milosavljević Kolarac.

Wanting to further expedite the construction, in 1865 Prince Michael ordered for the materials used for the expansion of his summerhouse in the town of Smederevo (Obrenović Villa) to be transferred to Belgrade, so that town hospital can be built. It is not clear whether this was concerning the leftovers of the materials remaining after the construction was finished, or he planned to build a larger edifice but stopped it at this point giving precedence to the hospital.

=== Fund raising ===
The funds of mostly came from various donations (Belgrade Municipality, state, artisan guilds, numerous citizens). On two occasions a charity balls had to be organized in order to raise funding. The balls, organized by the municipal administration, included the lottery. Especially successful was the early 1865 ball organized by Princess Julia Obrenović, Prince Mihailo's wife. It was held in the first hotel in Belgrade, the "Serbian Crown". The bidding objects included jewelry, sabers, dresses, etc. In total, 1.667 ducats, and many valuable presents, were collected, which enabled the beginning of the construction.

Further need for money prompted the continuous donations, so with the help of the royal family, state government and the municipal administration, in total 21,000 ducats were collected, which was the final price of the entire project. Even at the time, it was considered to be too much. The building of the National Theatre in Belgrade, another massive project which was constructed at the same time, cost 12,000 ducats.

=== Construction ===
The cornerstone was ceremonially laid on 30 June 1865 in the presence of the Prince, municipality aldermen, townsfolk and distinguished citizens. The construction company of Jozef Štajnlehner was hired to build the hospital. The hospital was officially opened on 1 May 1868, just few weeks before Prince Mihailo was assassinated in the Košutnjak forest.

=== Later developments ===
First Town Hospital became the General State Hospital in 1881. The edifice was fully reconstructed and conserved in 1975-1976: façade, carpentry, tinware, interior walls. In 1947, it became the Eye Clinic. The building was declared a cultural monument in 1979. In 1983, the Eye Clinic was relocated to the Pasterova Street, within the Clinical Center of Belgrade complex, while the city assigned the building to the Serbian Medical Society (SLD).

== Architecture ==
=== Design ===
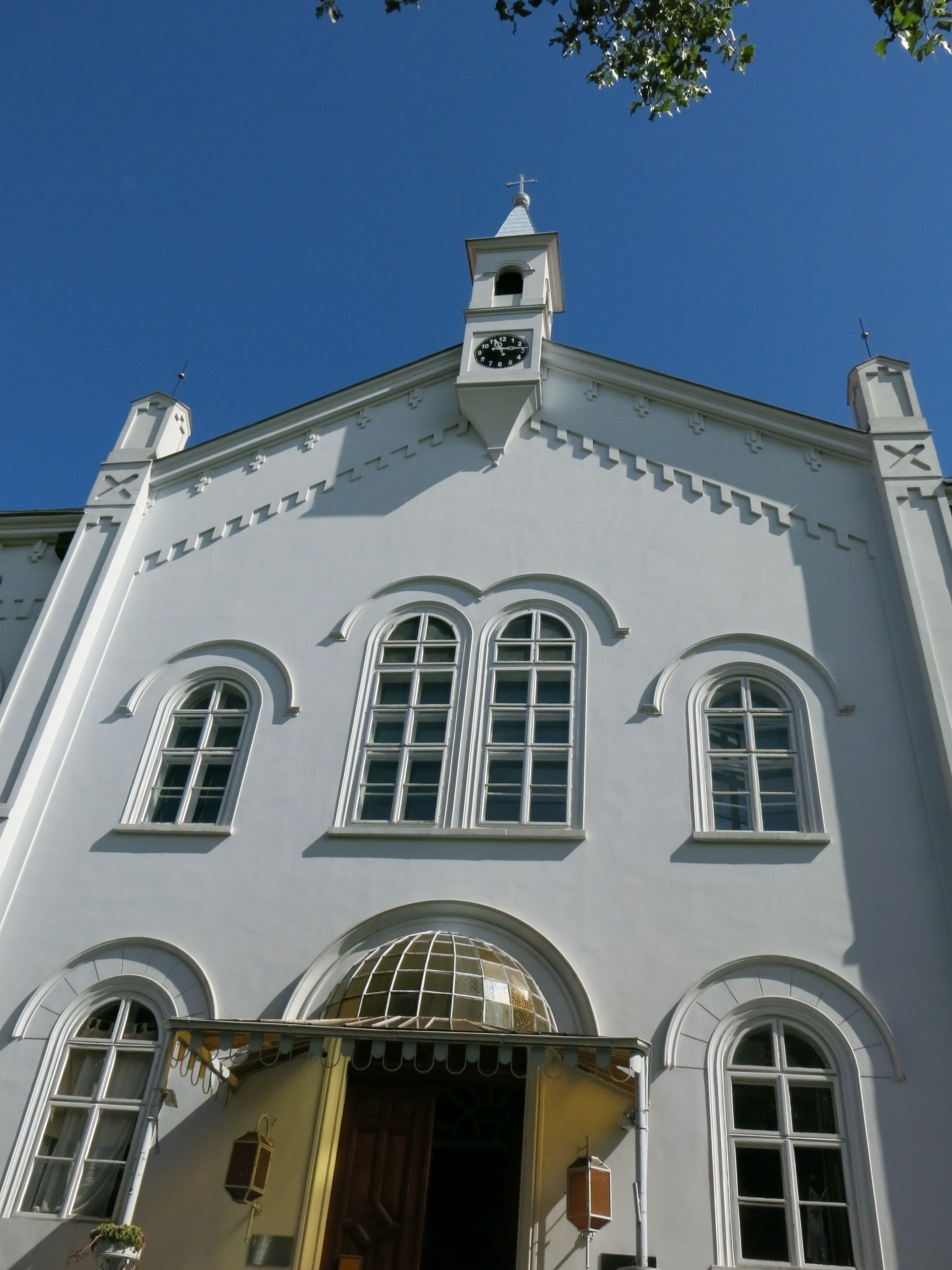
The front of the building

The design was a work of Jovan Frencl, "first class architect" in the Serbian Ministry of construction, who previously projected a new court for the Prince Mihailo ("Palace with towers", later demolished) which prince ultimately decided not to use so some of the ministries moved in.

Frencl designed the building after the Jewish Hospital in Berlin. He didn't live to see the finished project as he died during the construction.

The building was built with bricks, with the base in the shape of the irregular letter "T". The style is pure and simple, regarding both the façade, with its modest decorative plastic, and the design of the interior, without any ornaments, including the visible structural elements on the ceiling and on the architraves.

=== Exterior ===
The only protrusion on the façade is in the midsection, which is enhanced by the central avant-corps and the changed size of the windows, which change the otherwise reduced appearance. Upper part of this protrusion forms the transformation of the cornice into the triangularly shaped gable with the small Romanticist clock tower on the top of the building. Façades on the other sides of the building are much more simple and reduced.

=== Interior ===
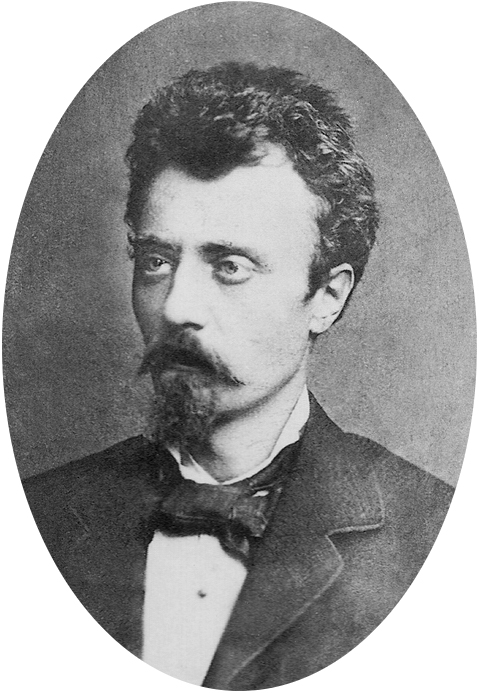
Laza K. Lazarević (1851-91), the second administrator of the hospital

The interior, especially the work on the walls, ceiling and the foyer, is in the Secession style. the hospital was organized in several sections. The utility rooms were located in the basement. Two hospital wards were organized on the ground and the first floors, with total of 120 beds. The boiler room was in the attic.

During the construction, modern technical designs for the ventilation, heating of the patient rooms and providing cold and hot water. It was a new system of ventilation, which at that time was a real avant-garde. At the time there was no knowledge about the microorganisms, but it was believed that stale air can cause or worsen the diseases. That is why the air that the patients were breathing had to be cleaner. There was a set quantity of how much air has to be in the room compared to the number of persons in it. Engineers were dispatched to Vienna, Austria, to examine the work of professor Carl Böhm on the ventilation systems in operas and hospitals in Vienna, Berlin and Prague. The methods of professor Bem were applied and the ventilation was set up through the pipes, built into the walls, that bring air to the door frame when the windows were closed. There was also a spring system for closing and opening the glass windows. The direction of the flowing air was changed depending on the inside/outside temperature difference and recorded on the dial indicators.

The hospital also had the underfloor heating: outer air was heated and conducted to the furnaces via pipes build into the floor. However, though patterned after the Austrian original, the system was not completely copied. Instead of a small furnaces with the fans, the Belgrade hospital was equipped with the large ones, which had several disadvantages: they were less energy efficient, occupied more space, and reduced the amount of light in the patients rooms.

The water was conducted from the Palilula drinking fountain by the waterpipe through the natural fall to the kitchen. Later, the six horsepower steam engine pushed the water into the attic to the big boiler, from where the water was further distributed to the floors.

== Medical history ==
First Town Hospital originally had no pharmacy of its own and work of the doctors was hampered by the mandatory police supervision of the hospital. Vladan Đorđević said: "[The building is] so unbound, but only one nice side of it is easy on the eye and had magnificent gates and staircase".

The hospital was transformed into the General Hospital. The hospital included the internist and surgical wards, as well as the laboratory. Laza K. Lazarević succeeded Valenta as the head of the facility. In 1887, Lazarević rented the building across the hospital, owned by artisan Hadži-Nikolić, and founded the Department for healing the old. In his addressing to the authorities he explained that "old age is neither illness nor health" and that "it is necessary to separate them from the other patients". This was the first recorded geriatrics ward in the world, predating work of Ignatz Leo Nascher. The ward was abolished after Lazarević's death.

Later, when German surgeon Ernst von Bergmann introduced the heat sterilization of the medical instrument, the equipment was obtained by the hospital. Two years after its invention, the hospital had the radiography apparatus for the X-ray imaging. Ocular and aural wards moved in into the first hospital in the 1920s. These wards were also very often referred to as the Eye clinic in the second half of the 20th century. Some of the most important names in Serbian medicine operated and treated patients here: Vladan Đorđević, Laza Lazarević, Vojislav Subotić, Đorđe Nešić, Eduard Mihel among others.
