= Zuko Džumhur =

Bosnian writer, painter and caricaturist (1920-1890)

Zuko Džumhur Зуко Џумхур
- Born: Zulfikar Džumhur; 24 September 1920; Konjic, Kingdom of Serbs, Croats and Slovenes
- Died: 27 November 1989 (aged 69); Herceg Novi, SR Montenegro, SFR Yugoslavia
- Education: University of Arts in Belgrade
- Occupations: Writer, painter, and caricaturist
- Writing career
- Period: 1947–1989
- Notable works: Nekrolog jednoj čaršiji (1958); Hodoljublja (1982)

Zuko Džumhur (Serbo-Croatian Cyrillic: Зулфикар Џумхур; 24 September 1920 – 27 November 1989) was a Bosnian writer, painter and caricaturist. His bohemian nature, versatility of a polymath and extremely creative personality have made him a unique figure of the Yugoslav culture in the second half of the 20th century.

After death his house in Konjic was declared a museum, he was memorialised as a stamp.

== Biography ==
Born as Zulfikar Džumhur in Konjic, Kingdom of Serbs, Croats and Slovenes (modern-day Bosnia and Herzegovina). When he was only two months old his father, the imam Abduselam Džumhur (1885–1933) and mother Vasvija (née Tufo; 1900–1978), moved to the capital of Belgrade, where his father got a job as the main imam of the Royal Yugoslav Army. Zuko Džumhur finished elementary school and the first four grades of high school in Belgrade, then moved to Sarajevo where he finished high school in 1939. Džumhur attended classes at the Law Faculty at the University of Belgrade, but soon left and later finished his studies at the Belgrade Academy of Arts in Petar Dobrović's class. During World War II, Džumhur's younger brother was killed in 1945.

Džumhur published his first caricatures in an army magazine in 1947, and very soon became one of the most prominent illustrators in Yugoslavia, publishing his caricatures in the country's best selling newspapers and magazines, such as Politika, Borba, Oslobođenje, Jež, NIN, Danas and many others. He published over 10,000 illustrations and caricatures, wrote numerous screenplays and worked on the TV show Hodoljublje, which he hosted for over ten years on Sarajevo Television.

In Belgrade during the seventies, Džumhur and other artists frequented the bohemian Skadarlija area of the old town. Zuko, along with other artists, was partly responsible for renovating and restoring the Tri šešira (Three Hats) cafe, a popular artist's hangout and a famous landmark in the street.

Džumhur published his first book in 1959, a travelogue entitled Nekrolog jednoj čaršiji (Obituary of a Small Town). Considered his best work, Nekrolog is also particularly representative of Džumhur's style of travel writing as a whole. Moving freely, fluidly and often unexpectedly between the familiar and the remote, past and present, real and imagined, Džumhur's travelogues are characterized by a certain mobility, fragmentariness and easy diversion. In the only preface he ever wrote, Ivo Andrić characterizes the writing in Nekrolog as similar to the illustrations with which Džumhur accompanies his text.

Džumhur died in Herceg Novi aged 69 in 1989. He was buried in Konjic, and his family home in that city was declared a museum.

== Works ==
- Nekrolog jednoj čaršiji (1958) (Obituary of a čaršija (the downtown/main street Ottoman-Turkish style bazaar)) (with an introduction by Ivo Andrić)
- Pisma iz Azije (1973) (Letters from Asia)
- Pisma iz Afrike i Evrope (Letters from Africa & Europe)
- Stogodišnje priče (Centennial tales)
- Putovanje bijelom Ladom (1982) (Voyage with white "Lada")
- Hodoljublja (1982, "TV Sarajevo") (Travelogue - a travel documentary with focus on culture, traditions, art and nature of Bosnia and Herzegovina, Yugoslavia and countries he sojourned, primarily Islamic and countries of Mediterranean Basin.)
- Adakale
- Zelena čoja Montenegra (Green carpet of Montenegro - co-authored with Momo Kapor)
