= Eduard Mihel =

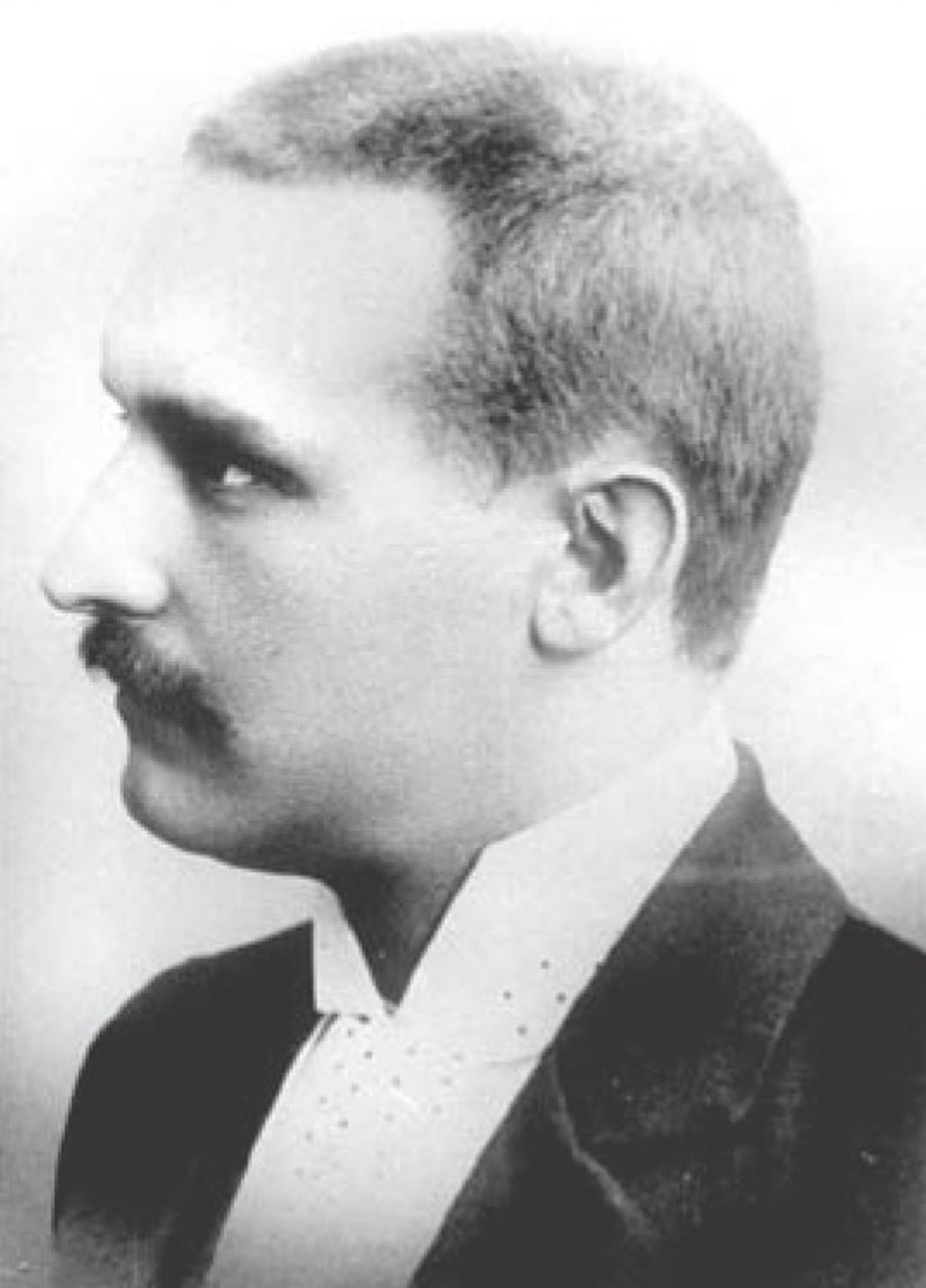
Eduard Mihel (c. 1895)

Eduard Mihel (Czech: Eduard Michl; 24 June 1864 in Rychnov nad Kněžnou, Austrian Empire – 24 March 1915 in Smederevska Palanka) was a Serbian physician born in the Austrian Empire. He is remembered as a pioneer of modern forensic pathology.

He held several posts, including public hygiene officer at the Sanitary Department at the Ministry of the Interior, a regular member of the Main Sanitary Council (today's Forensic Medicine Board) of the Kingdom of Serbia. He is one of the initiators for the establishment of the Medical Faculty in Belgrade, a member of the commission for taking exams for physicists, a member of the Serbian Medical Association and as a military doctor participant in the Balkan Wars and the First World War.

== Life and career ==
Born on 24 June 1864, in Rychnov nad Kněžnou, eastern Bohemia, where he finished both elementary and high school. Then, he began his medical studies in Berlin and continued his education in Vienna's School of Medicine, where he graduated in 1889. In addition to his native Czech, Eduard Mihel spoke excellent Serbian, German, French and English, his knowledge of the languages enabled him to acquire a solid education.

After graduating from medicine, he came to Belgrade, where, in accordance with the then Law on the regulation of the medical profession and the protection of public health from 1881, he received Serbian citizenship and was appointed a medical assistant at the Surgical Department of the Palilula Hospital, then managed by Dr. Vojislav Subotić. That is when the cooperation and mutual respect between these two prominent Serbian doctors began.

After a year (1882) spent in surgery, where he received excellent references for his work by Dr. Vojislav Subotić, he was transferred to the Department of Internal Medicine, which was headed by Dr. Svetislav Atanasijević. He also spent a year in that department, successfully completing his tasks. After two years of work in the Varoška Hospital in Palilula, the medical authorities appointed him a municipal doctor in Belgrade.

Because there was a special need in Serbian medicine at the end of the 19th century for the education of pathologists, bacteriologists and forensic doctors, on 18 November 1889, the Serbian Medical Association proposed to the Minister of the Interior to send one of the doctors for professional training in pathology. anatomy, pathological histology and forensic medicine. On the basis of this proposal, the medical authorities offered Dr. Eduard Mihel “to improve his skills in pathological anatomy, forensic medicine and bacteriology ”, which he immediately accepted and travelled to Vienna with professors Anton Weichselbaum and Eduard von Hofmann, where he spent most of his specialization. In 1896, he moved from Vienna to Freiburg, and then to Paris, for further specialization. He was the first pathologist to introduce histological techniques at the General State Hospital in Belgrade.

Upon his return from specialization, by the decree of King Aleksandar Obrenović, he was appointed chief professional Prosector of the Military and Town Hospital, therefore, throughout his further professional life, Dr. Mihel dealt with pathology and forensic medicine, and also bacteriology.

In 1897, Dr. Mihel was appointed also by decree as the personal physician of King Aleksandar Obrenović. He performed this duty until 1900 when he resigned "for medical reasons" because he did not agree with the marriage of King Alexander to Draga Mašin. After the murder of King Alexander and Queen Draga, Dr. Michel performed an autopsy on both bodies, and according to some data, only the body of Queen Draga.

He married Olga Kumanudi-Stanišić, bought a house in the center of Belgrade (today's building of the restaurant "Greek Queen" in Knez Mihailova Street), where numerous meetings, talks and receptions were held in the following years. Olga gave birth to a daughter Vera, whom they called Titika.

He died on 24 March 1915, in the Reserve Hospital in Smederevska Palanka, during the early stages of the First World War battles, at the age of 51, while treating Serbian soldiers.
