= Kopitareva Gradina =

Kopitareva Gradina Копитарева градина
- Urban neighbourhood
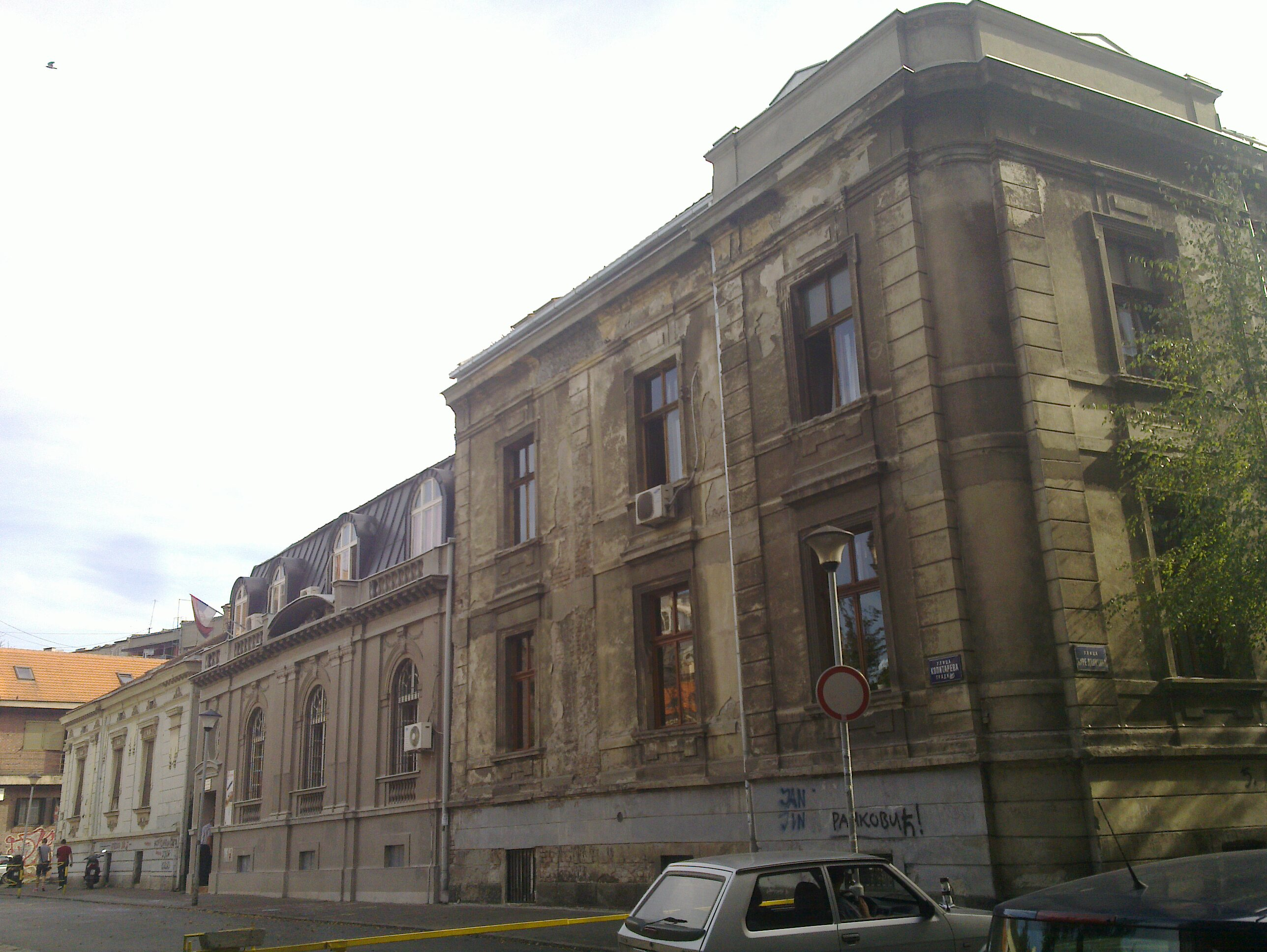
- Kopitareva Gradina

- Location within Belgrade
- Coordinates: 44°48′57″N 20°28′08″E
- Country: Serbia
- Region: Belgrade
- Municipality: Stari Grad
- Time zone: UTC+1 (CET)
  - Summer (DST): UTC+2 (CEST)
- Area code: +381(0)11
- Car plates: BG

Kopitareva Gradina (Serbian Cyrillic: Копитарева градина) is a square and an urban neighborhood of Belgrade, the capital of Serbia. It is located in Belgrade's municipality of Stari Grad.

== Location ==
Kopitareva Gradina is located in the east-central section of the municipality. It is located between the streets of Džordža Vašingtona, Hilandarska, Šafarikova, Đure Daničića, Bulevar despota Stefana, Jelene Ćetković and the square of Kopitareva Gradina itself. In the east it extends into the neighborhood of Jevremovac, in the south-east into Palilula, into Trg Republike on the west and into Dorćol in the north.

== History ==
Originally, the area was under the vineyards and was known as Mitropolitova bašta ("metropolitan's garden"), after a garden build and kept by the metropolitan of the Serbian Orthodox Church, Mihailo Jovanović. The area began to develop in the 1860s, following the construction of the First Town Hospital in Džordža Vašingtona Street in 1868. First houses were built in the late 19th century and city administration built a plan for the neighborhood in the early 1900s so for the most part, the area was urbanized in the period 1900–1914. City plan of creating lots was finished by 1905 and in 1907 a green square was built at the place of the Mitropolitova bašta and in 1924 the name of the neighborhood is changed to Kopitareva Gradina ("Kopitar's garden"), after Jernej Kopitar, Slovene philologist and collaborator of Vuk Karadžić, major reformer of the Serbian alphabet.

== Characteristics ==
Kopitareva Gradina is a unique ambiental and architectural neighborhood within Belgrade. Though urbanized in the 1910s, the dominant features in its skyline are for the most part preserved until today. Series of low, residential houses with back yards was built. The neighborhood is built in two different architectural styles: Classicism (and Academism) and Secession. Examples of the first are the houses built by the architect Sreten Stojanović, and of the latter work of Milan Antonović. At the time, Kopitareva Gradina was a place where many politicians and public figures built their own houses. The square itself is somewhat secluded and has no traffic importance. In Hilandarska Street is the museum, Memorial house of Laza K. Lazarević. Apart from Lazarević, other notable residents include Jovan Cvijić, Ljubomir Stojanović, Petar Palavičini and architect Antonović himself, and the houses were designed by the architects like Stojan Titelbah, Danilo Vladisavljević and the first Serbian woman architect Jelisaveta Načić.

Central section of the neighborhood remains a green area. Slightly trapezoid-shaped lot was adapted into the small park, which covers 4.89 ares (5,260 sq ft).

As an important cultural-historical complex, it has been declared a cultural property and protected by law on 27 December 1968 as the spatial cultural-historical unit.

== Features ==
=== Building of Petar Putnik ===
At 10 Đure Daničića Street, on the corner with the Džordža Vašingtona, there is a Building of Petar Putnik. A residential building, it was constructed in 1910 by Putnik himself, who was an engineer, for his family. Aside from bricks and steel beams, the reinforced concrete was used, which makes this building, along with the Belgrade Cooperative in the Savamala neighborhood, one of oldest edifices built using this material in Belgrade. In 1926 two additional floors and the mansard roof were added, completely keeping the architectural characteristics and style of the original building.

The building is designed in the Vienna Secession style and the main characteristic is the rich secessionist façade, considered as the "uniquely beautiful" in Belgrade. The dominant motifs of the lavish decoration are the female maskeroni (carved masked faces), which form a garland in the third floor area. Originally, the entire building was surrounded by garlands of triglyphs and metopes (decorative indentations and spaces between them), had carved ornaments between the windows and imitation of stone slabs on the lower levels. However, in time most of these ornaments perished.

In 2018 the renovation of the façade began. It was decided that only the ornaments visible before the renovation started will be preserved, though the local residents opted for the total reconstruction of the original façade. The contractor discovered the original ornaments from 1910 after the old plaster was removed, but they were plastered back again. Institute for the protection of the cultural monuments then "suggested" to the contractor to make old ornaments visible wherever possible. Though neglected for decades, the building and its surrounding were used as a location for numerous films and TV serials, including I Even Met Happy Gypsies (1967), Otpisani (1974), Nešto između (1983) and Bolji život (1987).

=== Monument to Jernej Kopitar ===
In 2017 the reconstruction of the square on the southwestern edge of the neighborhood was announced. Though small, six streets are conjoining at the square (two branches of Džordža Vašingtona, Palmotićeva, Milana Kašanina, Dalmatinska and Hilandarska). It was also announced that the monument to Jernej Kopitar, after whom the neighborhood was named, will be erected at the pedestrian section of the square. It was a result of collaboration of Belgrade and Ljubljana, the capital of Slovenia, as Belgrade donated the monument of Vuk Karadžić to Ljubljana in 2016. Ljubljana organized the design competition and among 11 designs selected the one by Matjaž Počivavšek.

The surrounding square was also projected by the Slovene architect, Roko Žnidaršič. The central part will be paved with three-colored granite cubes and left empty to serve as the multi-purposed area for various public events. There will also be new trees, benches, climbing wall and street-light candelabras. Work at the square and preparations for the monument began in April 2020. The project caused some controversy, both for the way it has been done and for the extended deadlines. Architect Borislav Stojkov described it as "unbelievable miss, too expensive, amateurishly designed and wretchedly realized". The deadlines continued to extend (July, between July and December, end of December). By the August 2021, the square wasn't finished yet and it was announced that the monument will probably not be placed before 2022. The pedestal was placed, but was demolished because of the changed design, and then the workers left. By December 2021 the plateau was dug out again. The monument was finally unveiled on 23 March 2022.

The plateau, however, wasn't completed. Street furniture was placed in May 2022, but the problems with the planned, ground level fountain remained, due to the installation's problems. Local residents responded that they don't care whether there will be a fountain or not, as they only waited for the overlong and sloppy construction works to finish after two years. After some 900 days and four extensions, the works were declared finished (without functional fountain), but the plateau already began to deteriorate.
