= Jevremovac =

Botanical garden in Belgrade, Serbia

Jevremovac Јевремовац
- Urban neighbourhood
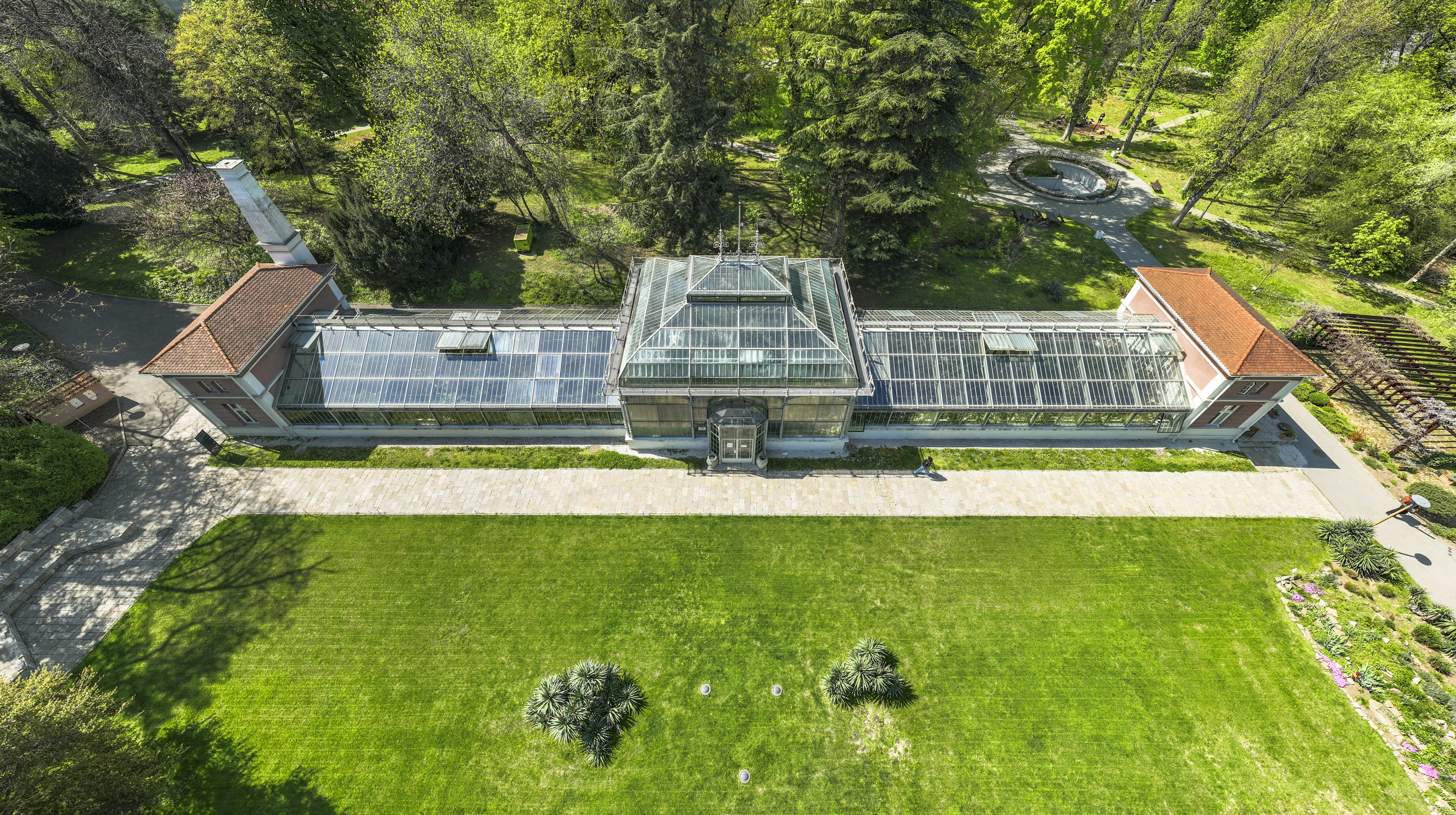
- Greenhouse in the Botanical Garden Jevremovac, Belgrade

- Location within Belgrade
- Coordinates: 44°48′56.9″N 20°28′23.6″E
- Country: Serbia
- Region: Belgrade
- Municipality: Stari Grad
- Time zone: UTC+1 (CET)
  - Summer (DST): UTC+2 (CEST)
- Area code: +381(0)11
- Car plates: BG

The Jevremovac Botanical Garden (Serbian Cyrillic: Ботаничка башта Јевремовац, romanized: Botanička bašta Jevremovac) is the botanical garden of the University of Belgrade and also a surrounding urban neighborhood of Belgrade, Serbia. The garden is located in the municipality of Stari Grad and is administered by the University of Belgrade's School of Biology.

It was declared a natural monument in 1995 and a cultural monument in 2007.

== Location ==
Jevremovac is located in the westernmost part of the Palilula neighborhood, but after the changes of the municipal administrative borders in 1952, 1955 and 1957, it did not become part of the municipality of Palilula but of Stari Grad. It is bounded by the Boulevard of Despot Stefan and the streets of Takovska, Dalmatinska, Palmotićeva and Vojvode Dobrnjca.

== Botanical garden ==
=== History ===
The botanical garden was founded in 1874 by the decree of the Ministry of Education of the Kingdom of Serbia, at the suggestion of the botanist Josif Pančić, who also became its first manager. Original lot assigned to Pančić was on the bank of the Danube, in the neighborhood of Dorćol, at the end of the Dunavska Street. Lots were abandoned by the ethnic Turks who left Belgrade after Turkish military garrison left the city, too, in 1867. City donated 1,400 ducats and Pančić arranged it, bit by bit. Terrain was adapted, and an embankment on the Danube was constructed. Pančić was pleased that the lot was in the vicinity of the downtown and the Kalemegdan Park, so that Belgraders can visit the garden with ease. The lot was parceled into several separate garden areas, a house for the gardener was built and the garden was officially opened in 1880.

However, proximity of the garden to the Danube didn't bode well for the development of the garden due to the flooding, despite the embankment. Pančić applied for another patch of land but died in 1888. One month after his death, in October 1888, major flooding destroyed almost everything Pančić planted. A year later, in 1889, even bigger flood inundated the remnants of the garden under a water one meter deep and destroyed everything that survived from the previous flood. Only some specimen, transferred to the garden of the Red Cross, survived. The garden became unusable.

In Pančić's honor, in 1889, king Milan Obrenović donated the estate (former orchard and vineyard, inherited from his grandfather Jevrem Obrenović) to the Great School in Belgrade for the purpose of the construction of new botanical garden, provided that it be named "Jevremovac" (Serbian for "Jevrem's garden"), after his grandfather. The lot was originally owned by the brothers Jovan German (1782–1854) and Mihailo Todorović German (d.1845). Even then, it was arranged as the large garden. Jovan was Jevrem's secretary and married his daughter Simka. As Jevrem survived Jovan, Simka and their three sons, who all died in childhood, he inherited the lot. At the time, the estate was on the outskirts of Belgrade, but soon city spread further from it, leaving the garden as an urban oasis. It exists to this day at the same location and under the same name and gave its name to the small surrounding neighborhood. Apart from its founder, Josif Pančić, very important for the development and growth of Jevremovac was its longtime manager (1906–1934), Nedeljko Košanin under whose supervision the botanical garden experienced its golden age.

In 1936, relocation of the garden was suggested. The proposed new location was Topčider park, on the outskirts of the city at the time. The reasons included description of Jevremovac as the "dead capital regarding city esthetics". Ultimately, the garden was not moved. After World War II, the new Communist authorities suppressed public usage of the word Jevremovac, so it was simply referred to as the "botanical garden" until the 1990s, when Jevremovac came into common usage again. Additionally, the arboretum was seriously neglected for decades, with the number of plants being reduced from 4,000 to 2,500, and has only recently began its partial renovation and beautification. It now hosts 60,000 visitors a year, and is the second most visited natural monument in Serbia, after the mountain and national park Kopaonik.

On 27 September 2022, a bust of Jevrem Obrenović was dedicated in the garden. It was placed under the old pedunculate oak tree, believed to existing before the land was donated for the garden.

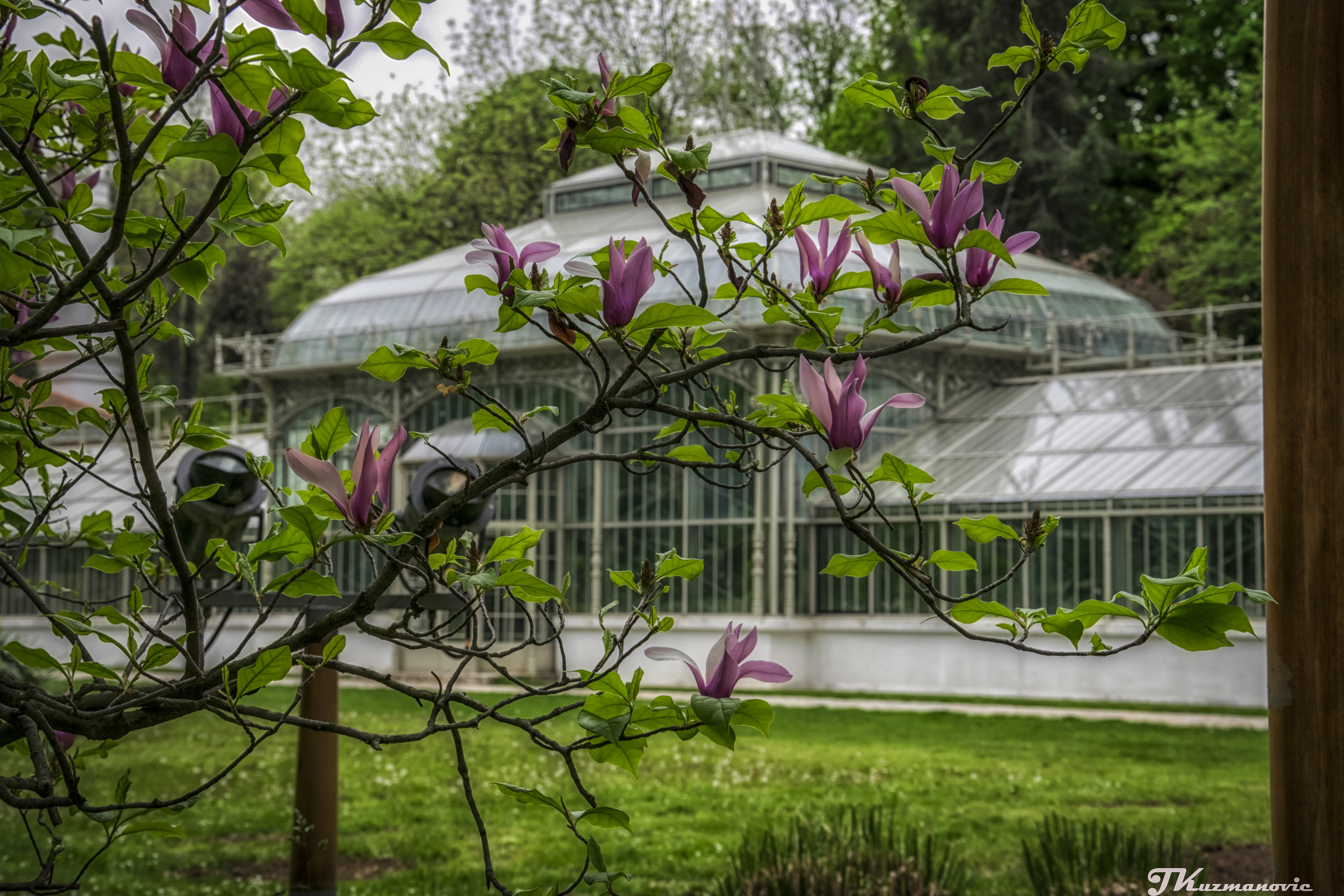
Magnolias in Jevremovac

=== Arboretum ===
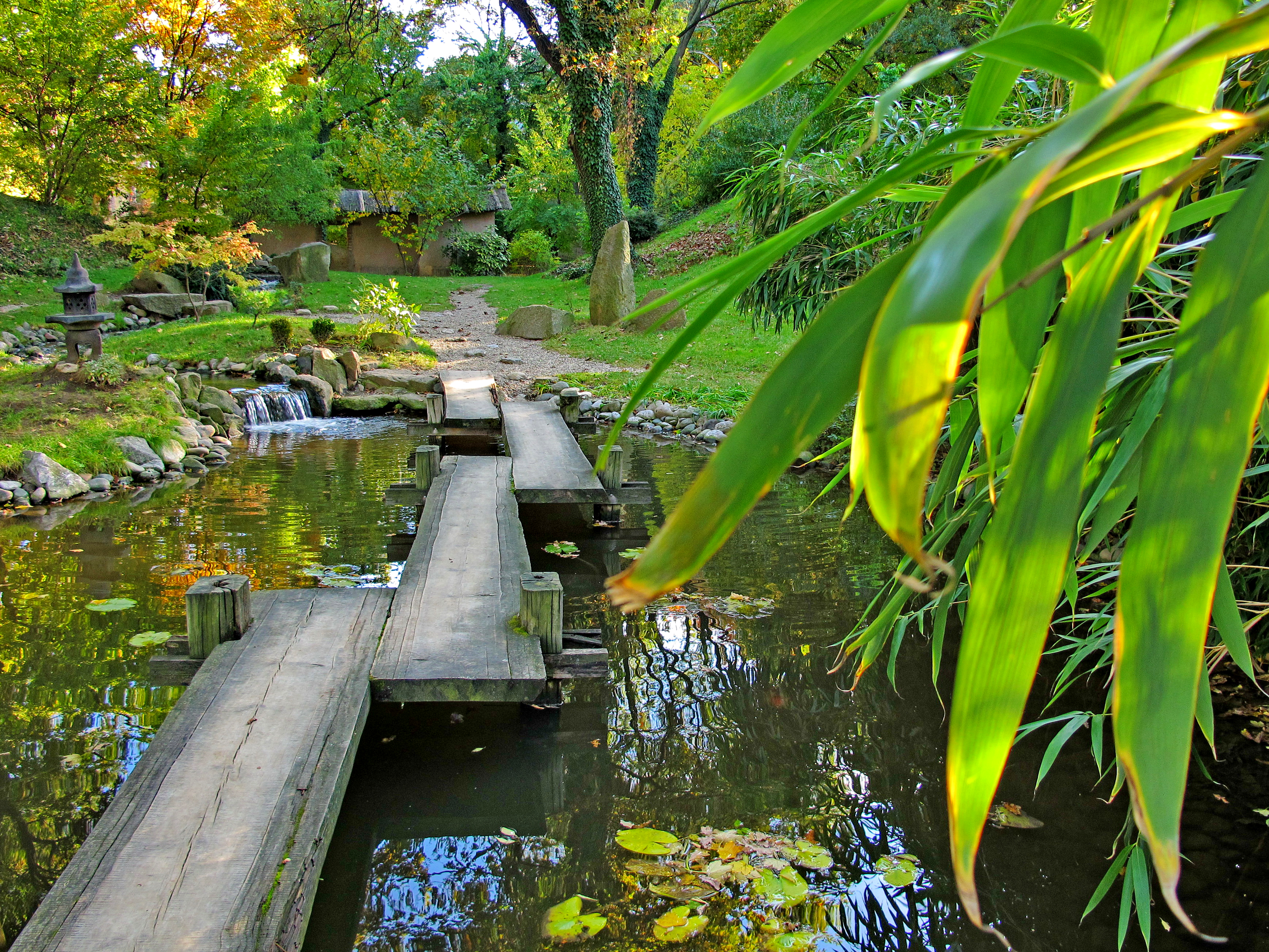
Jevremovac in Belgrade, Japanese garden

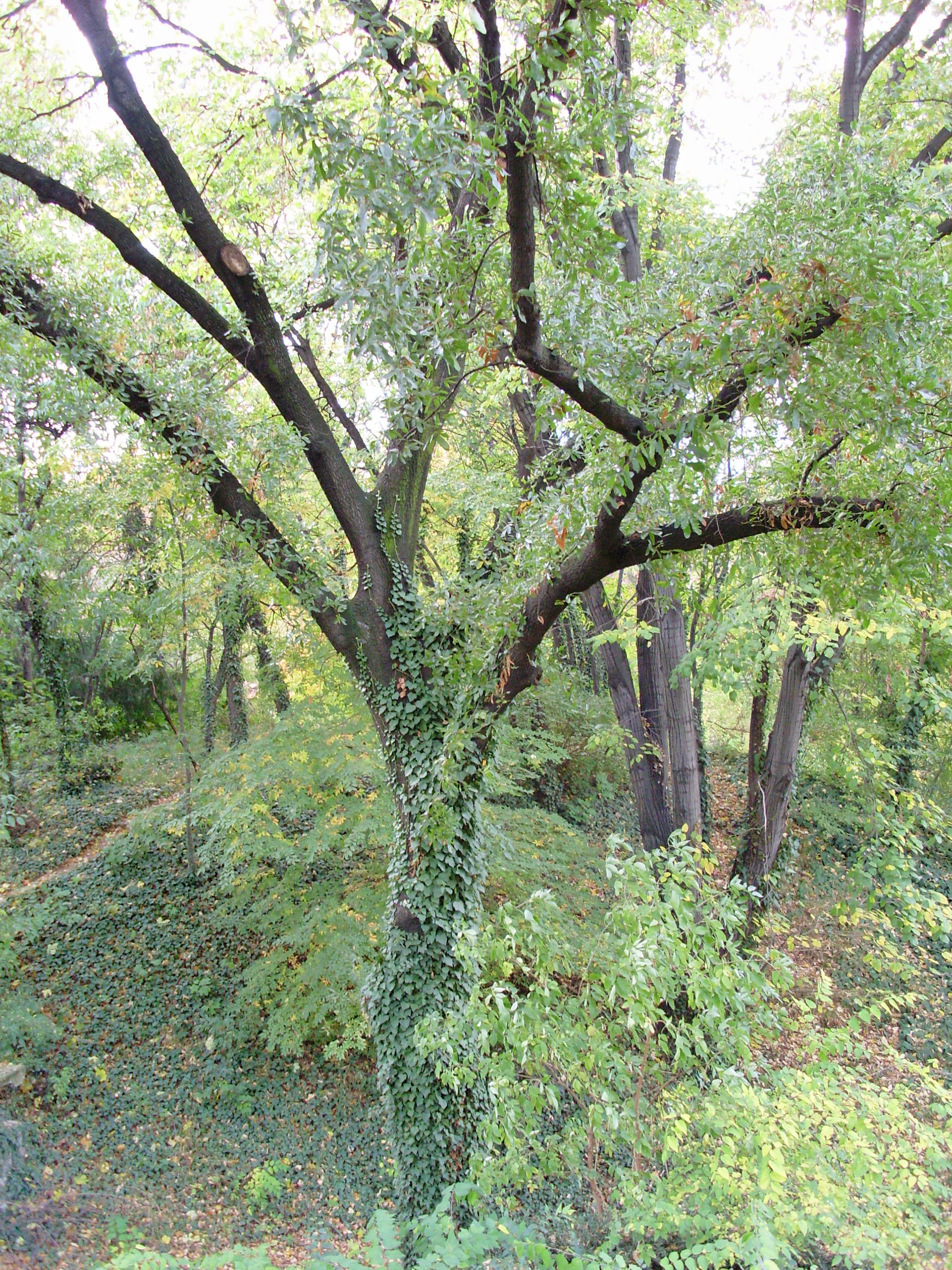
Quercus trojana, Botanical garden Jevremovac

The arboretum spreads over the area of 4.83 ha (11.9 acres) of open space and hosts 2,500 different plant species. That includes over 250 species of trees and bushes including local, European and exotic plants. The total plant population now includes about 500 trees, bushes and herbaceous plants. Curiosity is a 150 years old oak Quercus trojana, believed to be a remnant of the vast oak woods common in this area. The oak itself is declared a natural monument. Actually, there are trees which are natural offspring of the trees which made forest in the original Obrenović garden, which was cleared when the garden was formed. They include Turkey oak, ash, beech and pedunculate oak. Some are originating from the 1960s. Among numerous other, later planted species, there are giant sequoia, ginkgo biloba, Mexican palm, ephedra, etc.

Besides the open space, the arboretum also includes a greenhouse and the Institute of Botany's premises (administrative building, herbarium, library, lecture hall and laboratories). In front of the administrative building, a bust of the former manager Nedeljko Košanin was erected in 2006, celebrating 100 years of his appointment.

As the majority of garden is in the open, the birds are nesting in the canopies. Most abundant are the crows and nightingales.

Parts of the arboretum are European garden and a Japanese garden, which was opened on 18 May 2004. The Japanese garden is created by Vera and Mihailo Grbić, landscape architects, and covers an area of 20 ares (22,000 square feet). The garden includes artificial water flow over the cascades and the central pond with water lilies. The pond is filled from the natural spring, located almost 100 m (330 ft) below the ground. European garden was opened in 2006.

In cooperation with the Smithsonian Institution, the Pollinators' Oasis was opened on 31 October 2023. Apart from info boards about the process of pollination, the section was planted with plants which flower all year round, to provide the pollen. A specially designed "bee hotel" was also installed, where the process of eggs laying, honeycomb forming and honey making will be transparent to the visitors.

The arboretum is open to visitors from May 1 to November 1 (09.00 a.m. – 07.00 p.m.).

=== Greenhouse ===
The greenhouse, built in 1892, covers an area of 500 m^{2} (5,400 sq ft). The parts of the greenhouse were transported from Germany, and it took 6 month to reassemble the object. At the time of its construction, it was one of the biggest greenhouses in this part of Europe. Over 1,000 species of tropical and sub-tropical plants are being nursed, including Canary Island date palm, European Fan Palm, and Peruvian cactus (Cereus peruvianus). The greenhouse is protected by the law for its architectural values. It consists of two wings, which are connected via the central dome.

The parts for the greenhouse were made in Dresden, then transported to Belgrade and assembled. It was built in the Victorian-secession style. Garden's manager Nedeljko Košanin ordered another greenhouse built in the same style in 1922. He planned to populate the existing one with the local species, and the new one with the foreign plants. It is not known why the plan was not implemented.

It was reconstructed in 1970. After partially collapsing in June 2005, it was thoroughly reconstructed, that is, completely deconstructed and then built again, from 2012 to 3 October 2014.

Some of the exhibits in the greenhouse are wild banana tree, coffee tree and numerous orchids. There is a collection of 400 cactus species.

=== Herbarium ===
The herbarium, founded in 1860 and named after Josif Pančić, accommodates rich collections of plants originating from the Balkan Peninsula and the rest of Europe containing around 120,000 herbarium sheets and over 300,000 dried specimens. It includes 16,000 sheets originally gathered by Pančić himself and specimens of some species which are extinct today.

=== Library ===
The library is one of the oldest and the largest in this part of the world. It was founded in 1853 at the Belgrade Lyceum, where Pančić was a professor at the time. Apart from 200 scientific and professional magazines it also accommodates over 6,000 books, including Pliny the Elder’s Natural History, printed in 1562.

=== Underground ===
During one of the reconstructions of the administrative building, two underground rooms with oval-shaped ceilings were accidentally discovered when a wall collapsed. They are assumed to be part of Belgrade’s lagums, vast web of underground corridors which spread beneath the surface of the city. As the temperature, even at the highest, never goes over 20 Celsius, it was used as a huge refrigerator where food and wine were cooled and preserved for the royal court, which is why they are called "King’s ice-cellars". They cover 80 m^{2} (860 sq ft) and have a draining well at the center which drained the water from melted ice. Ice itself was brought during the cold winters when the Danube would freeze. Food was kept in the layers of ice and straw. Due to the high humidity and moisture, electricity can't be introduced, so they are not opened for public.

Another lagum is close to the greenhouse. During both World Wars, it was used as a shelter, but today is also inaccessible because it is flooded by the underground water. During the creation of the Japanese garden, a flow of underground water was discovered near lagum at the depth of 92 meters. Water is of an excellent quality and is used for watering plants in the garden and for filling artificial ponds.

=== Pančić gallery ===
In 1994 construction of an edifice, which covers 1,800 m^{2} (19,000 sq ft), began by the Ministry of Culture. The legal permits were not obtained, so only the concrete skeleton was built by 1995 when the construction was halted. By this time, already DM1 million was spent on the project. The structure was covered with the temporary wooden roof and left to the elements. 2019–2020 surveys showed that, apart from the rotten wooden cover, the structure was in excellent shape. In May 2020 it was announced that the building will be permitted, finished and adapted into the gallery of Josif Pančić.

Exhibits will include his personal belongings, works, books, herbarium from the 1850s and digitization of his complete legacy. There are also plans for several small, science-promoting laboratories within the building, zoological and botanical collections, seed bank of Serbian autochthonous plant species and auditorium for 190 people. When the project is greenlighted, it should be finished in only 2 months. The structure was officially permitted in December 2020, and its completion was announced for 2021.

=== In popular culture ===
Jevremovac is also a place where exhibitions, concerts, theatre shows and fashion shows are held. Films which have used the garden as a setting include We Are Not Angels (1992), Obituary for Escobar (2008) and Montevideo, God Bless You! (2010), while their music videos shot here Leo Martin and Legende.

== Neighborhood ==
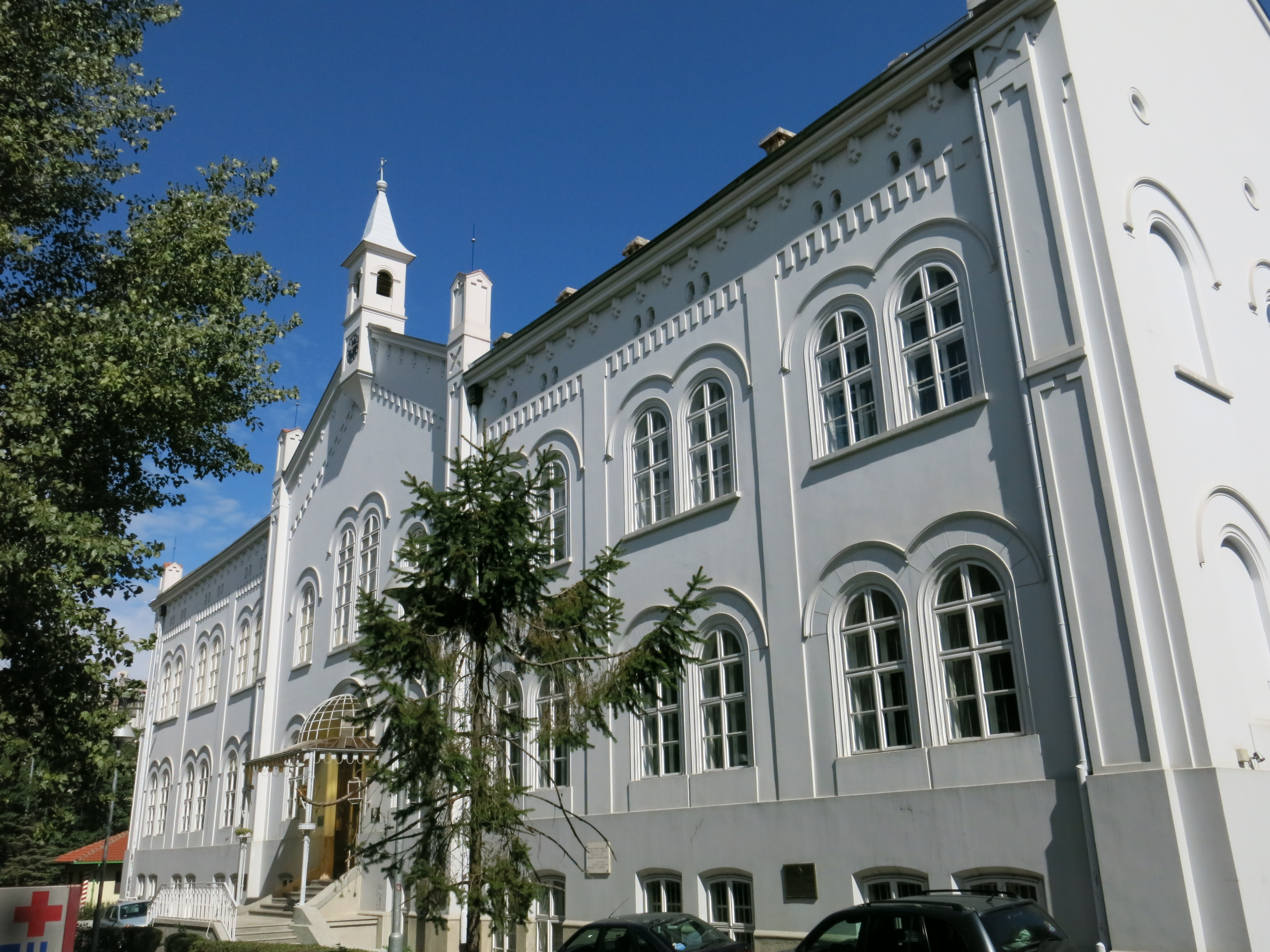
The First Town Hospital, built in 1868

The neighborhood is wider than the garden itself. It is bounded by the streets of Bulevar despota Stefana on the north (dividing it from the neighborhoods of Stari Grad and, further, Viline Vode), Cvijićeva on the west (Profesorska Kolonija), Takovska on the southeast and south (Stara Palilula, Tašmajdan), Svetogorska on the southwest (Dva Bela Goluba) and Palmotićeva (Kopitareva Gradina).

The First Town Hospital, built in 1868, the first building purposely to serve as a hospital in Belgrade, is located in the neighborhood. Other public buildings include elementary school "Vuk Karadžić" and Belgrade Institute for Urbanism.

At the northwest corner, there is a small square, where streets of Bulevar Despota Stefana, Drinčićeva, Gundilićev Venac and Carigradska meet. On 24 March 2021 rearrangement of the square's semi-circular pedestrian island began in order to erect the monument to the despot Stefan Lazarević. The leveling with the neighboring streets is done with the small, cascade walls, while the area around the monument is made of white marble square slabs and stone curbs. The sidewalk is combined from various-sized grey granite. There are two green strips, one of grass, another of perennials. Six linden trees are planted and the benches are placed. The monument is sculptured by Svetomir Arsić-Basara. The pedestal is only 9 cm (3.5 in) high, while the bronze sculpture itself has 4 m (13 ft). The monument was dedicated on 19 April 2021.

=== Major features ===
==== House of Filip Filipović ====
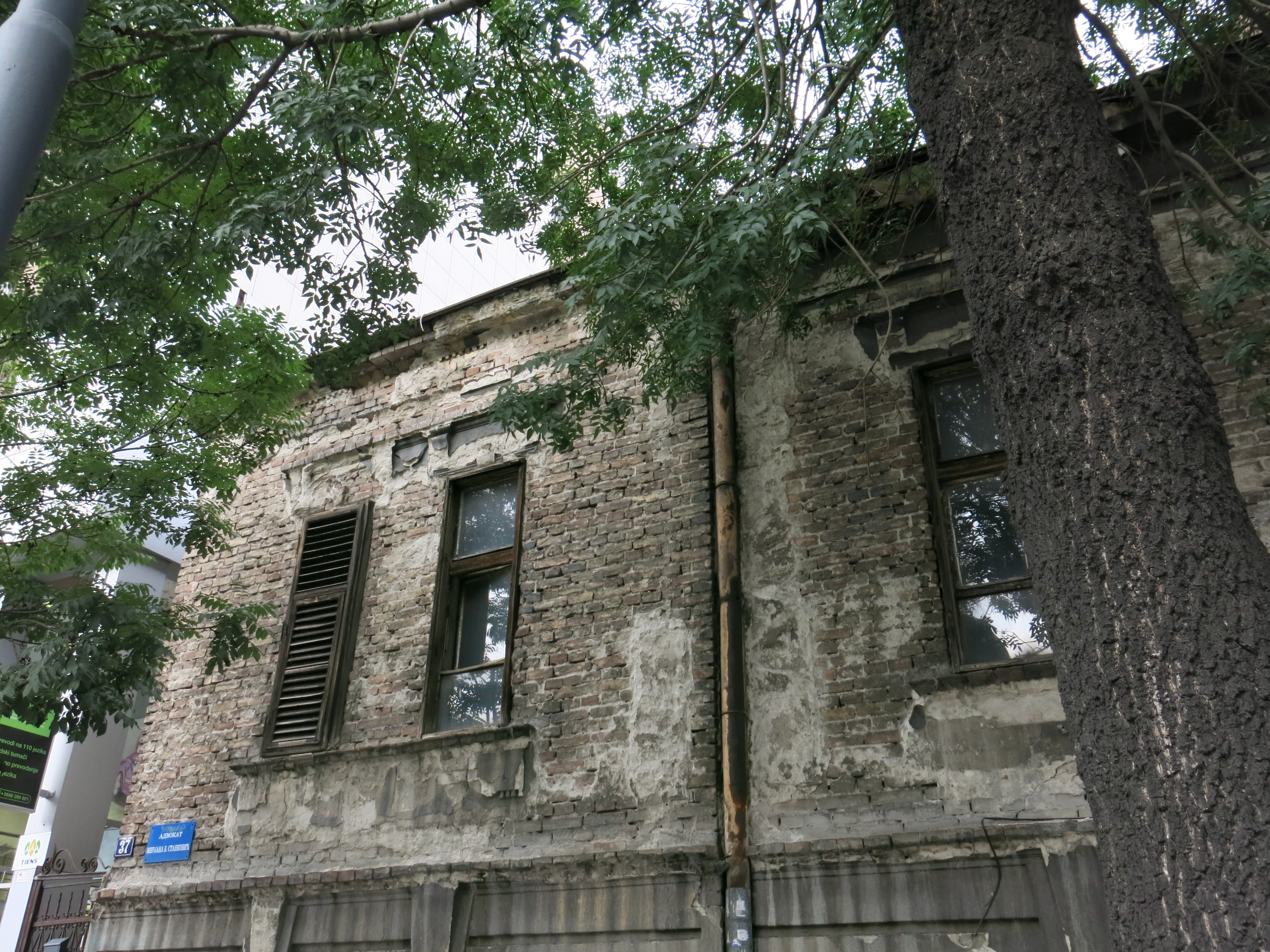
The House of Filip Filipović at 37 Takovska Street. It was built in c. 1900, declared a cultural monument in 1984 and demolished in 2018

The house at 37 Takovska Street, the House of Filip Filipović, was declared a cultural monument in 1984. It was a semi-detached ground floor house ("twin house"), quite common in the suburbia of Belgrade, including Palilula, at the time. It was built in c. 1900. After 1912, a top Communist official and elected mayor of Belgrade in 1920 Filip Filipović lived in the house. It was declared a cultural monument only because of the historic value, not architectural one. By 2018 the house was completely neglected and became derelict. The Institute for the protection of the monuments allowed it to be demolished and for a 6-storey hotel to be built instead. The house was demolished in the autumn of 2018.

However, the investor did not follow the construction and safety laws. They usurped the pedestrian sidewalk and placed a 30 m (98 ft) tower crane on it, right above the underground waterworks grid. Additionally, they encased in concrete the waterworks and other communal infrastructure, walling it in into the load-bearing wall of the future building's foundation. After two bursts of the water pipes in December 2018, the second time right below the crane, water undermined the base of the crane which tilted. This became a major city news as the streets were closed, police blocked the area, neighborhood was cut from the water supplies and residents of the surrounding buildings were resettled. It took almost two days for the communal services to dismantle the leaning crane. The pipes continued to burst in the next period.

== See also ==
- Botanical Garden Kragujevac
