= Radoslav Marjanović =

Serbian politician

Radoslav Marjanović (Serbian Cyrillic: Радослав Марјановић; born 1989) is a politician in Serbia. He has served in the Assembly of the City of Belgrade since 2014 and was chosen as the president (i.e., mayor) of the Belgrade municipality of Stari Grad in August 2020. Marjanović is a member of the Serbian Progressive Party.

== Early life and career ==
Marjanović was born in Belgrade, in what was then the Socialist Republic of Serbia in the Socialist Federal Republic of Yugoslavia. He is a graduate of the Faculty of Economics, Finance and Administration.

== Politician ==
=== Member of the Belgrade City Assembly ===
Marjanović received the fifty-second position on the Progressive Party's Let's Get Belgrade Moving electoral list in the 2012 Belgrade local elections. The list won thirty-seven mandates, and he was not returned. He was promoted to the thirty-eighth position in the 2014 Belgrade City Assembly election and was elected when the list won a majority victory with sixty-three seats. He was re-elected to a second term in the 2018 city election. He has been the deputy leader of the Progressive Party's group in the assembly and has chaired the committee for budget and finance.

=== President of Stari Grad ===
Marjanović received the sixth position on the Progressive Party's list for Stari Grad in the 2020 Serbian local elections and was elected when the list won a plurality victory with twenty-seven out of fifty-six seats. He was chosen as mayor of the municipality in August 2020 with the support of forty-three members, including those elected on the Socialist Party of Serbia–United Serbia and Serbian Patriotic Alliance lists.

=== At the republic level ===
Marjanović received the 172nd position on the Progressive Party's Aleksandar Vučić – Serbia Is Winning list in the 2016 Serbian parliamentary election. The list won 131 mandates, and he was not returned.
