= Momo Kapor =

Serbian novelist and painter

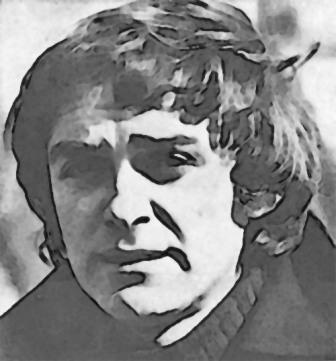
- Kapor c. 1976
- Born: Momčilo Kapor; 8 April 1937; Sarajevo, Kingdom of Yugoslavia
- Died: 3 March 2010 (aged 72); Belgrade, Serbia
- Resting place: Belgrade New Cemetery
- Occupations: Writer, painter, novelist, poet
- Children: Ana, Jelena
- Writing career
- Period: 1975–2010
- Notable works: Beleške jedne Ane, Foliranti, Zoe, Una: ljubavni roman

Momčilo "Momo" Kapor (Serbian Cyrillic: Момчило Момо Капор; 8 April 1937 – 3 March 2010) was a Serbian novelist and painter.

He authored several screenplays, over forty novels, short stories, travel and autobiographic books and essays. He was introduced to the literary circles as the author of radio, TV and theater drama at the beginning of the sixties. His books have been translated to twenty languages. The shorts stories collection Kinoteka at three and novels The Green Felt of Montenegro and The Last Flight to Sarajevo were published in French by L'Age d'homme in Lausanne while The Mastery of Šlomović was published by Xenie in Vevey.

His paintings were exhibited in New York, Boston, Geneva, Frankfurt, London and other cities. He was also known as an illustrator, illustrating his own and numerous books by other authors. He was a regular member of the Academy of Sciences and Arts of Republika Srpska.

== Early life ==
Kapor was born in 1937 in Sarajevo, Drina Banovina, Kingdom of Yugoslavia. His father, Gojko Kapor, was a bank clerk, and his mother, Bojana was a housewife. In 1941, during World War II, a bomb fell on the home in which Kapor, his grandmother, and his mother were taking refuge. Kapor's mother used her body as a shield and, although she was killed, Kapor was able to survive.

Immediately following World War II, Kapor moved with his family to Belgrade, Serbia where he remained for most of his life.

== Education ==
As a young man, Kapor studied painting at the Academy of Art in Belgrade under the guidance of Professor Nedeljko Gvozdenović. Although Kapor graduated with a degree in painting, he had grown fond of writing as a young boy. Therefore, while studying art he also occupied his time with news writing. Kapor would write news articles and interviews and then accompany his writing with his own representative portrait or illustration. It is through this method that Kapor was able to combine his two greatest passions he had in life, painting and writing.

== Literary works ==
Kapor was one of the most popular Serbian writers, whose literary phenomenon has spread over three decades. Kapor easily attracted the attention of the public by writing his constant reflections on the reality of the current time. The generations of people from former Yugoslavia were connected through Kapor's writings which have become best sellers in Zagreb's publisher "Znanje" and its famous library "Hit".

Kapor also wrote many documentary films, television shows, and novels. His novels, "Una" and "The Book of Complaints" were made into films. These films have been translated into many languages including: French, German, Polish, Czech, Bulgarian, Hungarian, Slovenian, and Swedish. His most famous works include, "Ada", "Zoe", "From Seven to Three", and "The Chronicle of a Lost City".

== Artwork ==
Kapor has exhibited many of his paintings across various countries such as in the United States, Germany, and France. The reason he preferred to showcase his artwork in foreign countries rather than in Belgrade was that he did not enjoy the "art climate" set in Belgrade. He felt that many great artists in Belgrade were forgotten, whereas in other countries, a new emerging artist does not "erase" those who came before him/her.

== Death ==
After having two surgeries, Kapor died from throat cancer on 3 March 2010.

== Works ==
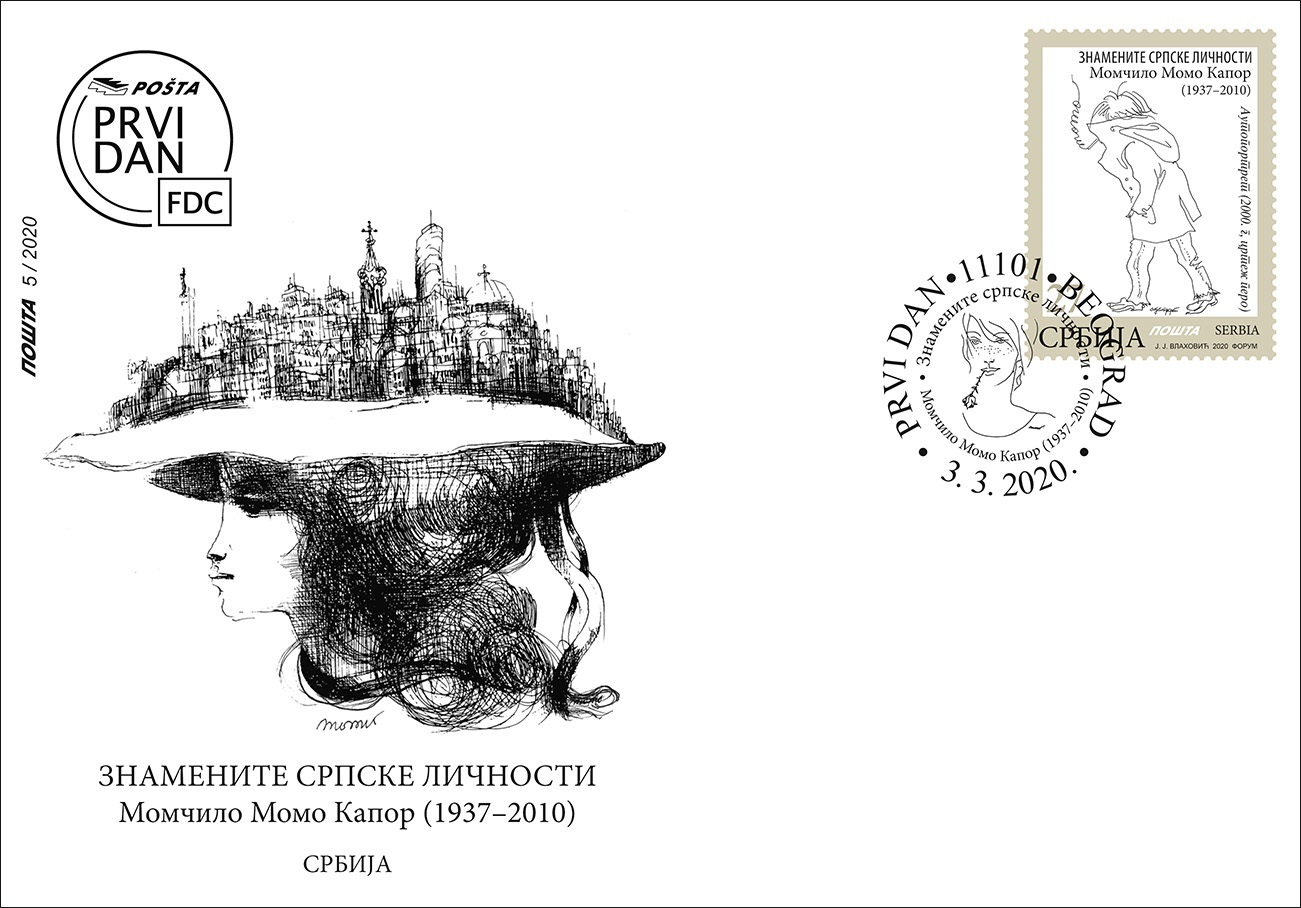
A 2020 post card featuring Kapor's artwork (left) and self-portrait (right)

- Foliranti, 1975
- Provincijalac, 1976
- Ada, 1977
- Lanjski snegovi, 1977
- Hej, nisam ti to pričala, 1978
- Zoe, 1978
- Beleške jedne Ane (hronika u 26 glava), 1978
- Skitam i pričam: putopisni dnevnik, 1979
- 101 priča, 1980
- Una: ljubavni roman, 1981
- Onda, 1982
- Sentimentalno vaspitanje, 1983
- Knjiga žalbi, 1984
- 011-Istok-Zapad, 1990
- Halo, Beograd, 1990
- Dama skitnica i off priče, 1992
- Zelena čoja Montenegra, 1992
- Blokada 011, 1992
- 100 nedelja blokade, 1994
- Lero – kralj leptira, 1995
- Poslednji let za Sarajevo, 1995
- Hronika izgubljenog grada, 1996
- Od sedam do tri, 1996
- Smrt ne boli: priče iz poslednjeg rata, 1997
- Najbolje godine i druge priče, 1997
- Ivana, 2001
- Od istog pisca, 2001
- Legenda o Taboru, 2002
- Sanja, 2003
- Čuvar adrese
- Dosije Šlomović
- Konte
- Lep dan za umiranje
- Ljubavne priče
- Samac
- Uspomene jednog crtača
- Eldorado
- Putopis kroz biografiju
