= Stojan Titelbah =

Serbian architect (1877–1916)

Stojan Titelbah, also spelled Stojan Titelbach (Serbian Cyrillic: Стојан Тителбах; 1877 – 20 March 1916) was a Serbian architect who worked in the Serbian metropolis Belgrade.

== Biography ==
Titelbah was born in Belgrade to Czech engineer Vladislav Titelbah (who had emigrated from Prague to Serbia in 1875), and Katica (née Vasić) of Belgrade. He finished primary and secondary school in Belgrade. Stojan went on to study architecture at the Faculty of Technology at the Velika škola in Belgrade. He graduated in 1901 from the Department of Architecture. In the same year, together with architect Vladimir Popović (1876-1947), he was awarded the first prize from the will of the merchant Dimitrije Stamatović for the project of a spa building for entertaining visitors and a plan for arranging the park, as well as a discussion about these types of buildings. He probably worked privately at the beginning, and then he was employed as an architect in the Ministry of Construction from 30 January 1905 until the end of his life. He designed several residential-commercial and residential buildings, with a lot of taste and imagination, applying elements of historical styles and secession. Before [World War I], he traveled to France. Together with Nikolaj Krasnov and Aleksandar Bugarski, he was one of the few architects who at the turn of the century significantly influenced the architecture of Belgrade.

Titelbah participated in the First World War, crossed the Albanian mountains and arrived at Corfu. There, on 20 March 1916, he committed suicide, which was a consequence of his depression. He was buried in the ossuary on the island Vido.

== Works ==
His most significant works include the New Palace, which was commissioned by the court, originally intended for the royal family Karađorđević, now the seat of the President of Serbia. He also personally supervised the construction, from its beginning in 1911 until construction was halted in 1914 because of the war. As an architect in the service of the court, Titelbah received a wristwatch engraved with "Stojan Djordje" from Đorđe P. Karadjordjević. After the war, construction on the palace resumed and the building was completed in 1921.

Titlebah also designed several smaller houses in the Serbian capital, including the Mihailo Popović's House which is located in the central part of Vračar.

Among the business facilities he designed include:

- house of Aron Levi at Kralja Petra 39 (1907)
- house of Jacques Bouly at Kralja Petra 58.

Of the residential buildings are significant projects:

- house of Svetislav Okanović at Makedonska 27;
- house of Jovan Barlovac at France 15;
- house of Rista Odavić at Alekse Nenadovića 35;
- house of Dragan Đorđević na Topličinom vencu 29 (1905);
- house of Stevan Pavlović (clerk in the Ministry of Foreign Affairs) on the corner of Gospodar Jovanova and Francuska Street;
- house of Marija Rekalić at Tadeoša Košćuška Street 18;
- Filip Stojanović's house on the corner of Proleterskih brigada and Smiljanićeva 45;
- House of Mihailo Popović (parish priest in the church of Saint Sava) at Kursulina 35;
- house of Milenko Materni at Hilandarska 15 (co-architect Andra Stevanović).

== Literature ==
- Đurić-Zamolo, Divna. Graditelji Beograda 1815-1914
- Nedić, Svetlana (1997). Jakovljević, Zoran (ed.). "Prilog proučavanju kuće sveštenika Mihaila M. Popovića u Kursulinoj ulici broj 35" [Contribution to the study of the house of the priest Mihailo M. Popović at 35 Kursulina street]. Nasleđe (Heritage) (in Serbian) (1). Belgrade: Institute for the Protection of Cultural Monuments of the City of Belgrade: 61–68.
- Petrović, Vuk (2015). O Česima i njihovim potomcima u Srbiji južno od Save i Dunava [About the Czechs and their descendants in Serbia south of the Sava and Danube] (in Serbian). Belgrade: Češka beseda. ISBN 9788691647162.
- Pavlović-Lončarski, Vera (2000). Jakovljević, Zoran (ed.). "Prilog proučavanju dela arhitekte Stojana Titelbaha u Beogradu" [A contribution to the study of the work of the architect Stojan Titelbach in Belgrade]. Nasleđe (Heritage) (in Serbian) (2). Belgrade: Institute for the Protection of Cultural Monuments of the City of Belgrade: 25–32. ISSN 2560-3264.
- Popović, Stevan, ed. (1893). „Uz naše ilustracije”. Orao - Veliki ilustrovani kalendar za 1894. godinu. Novi Sad: Arsa Pajević.
