= Nedeljko Košanin =

Serbian biologist and academic

Nedeljko Košanin (13 October 1874 – 22 March 1934) was a scientist biologist, university professor and academic at the Serbian Royal Academy, now the Serbian Academy of Sciences and Arts. He was the manager of the Jevremovac Botanical Institute and Botanical Garden of the University of Belgrade.

== Biography ==
He was born on a farm in the village of Čečina, and according to some sources in the neighbouring Vionica near Ivanjica, at the time in the Principality of Serbia, to parents Stana and Stevan. His parents enrolled him in an elementary school in Pridvorica, ten kilometres away from home, which he completed in 1887.

After that, he enrolled in the Užice Grammar School, but very soon after that, he transferred to the First Belgrade Grammar School, and graduated in 1895. He also graduated from the Department of Chemistry at the Velika škola in Belgrade four years later (1899).

As a socialist, a member of the Serbian Social Democratic Party, he could not get a job in the civil service. He rented a steam mill in Rakovica and at one time engaged in the milling industry. At the end of 1899, however, he managed to join the civil service and for a short time worked as a professor-traineeand a substitute teacher at the Second Belgrade Gymnasium. He left the civil service to pursue his studies abroad.

He spent 1900–1902 in Leipzig at the Laboratory for Plant Physiology, and then, in 1903–1905, as a botany assistant at the Leipzig College of Medicine, with the German plant physiologist Wilhelm Pfeffer. He defended his doctoral dissertation with Pfeffer in 1905 on "The effect of temperature and air pressure on leaf position" (Über den Einfluss von Temperatur und Ätherdampf auf die Lage der Laubblätter). He passed the professor's exam in Belgrade in 1905.

Upon his return to Belgrade, he worked as a substitute lecturer at the Bogoslovija Svetog Save (School of Theology of Saint Sava), as a temporary lecturer (1906) and then as permanent (1908) Assistant Professor of Botany at the University of Belgrade. He was also selected as an assistant professor at the University of Belgrade's Jevremovac Botanical Institute, from which he was promoted to full professor. Since he no longer had the conditions in Belgrade to continue his research in the field of physiology, because it required a well-equipped laboratory, he devoted himself to natural history. As early as 1898, as a student with Zoology professor Živojin Đorđević in Belgrade, he studied the insects of the Coleoptera in Serbia. He continued these studies in 1904, and a list of hard-winged beetles was published in the Educational Gazette in December of the same year. The list contained 849 species, grouped into 409 genera and 49 families.

He participated in the Balkan Wars as a company commander in the rank of captain, in the Drina Division. While a soldier in northern Albania in 1913 he studied the plants in that territory and published the results of his studies in the paper "On the vegetation of northeastern Albania" (1914). World War I found him in Graz with his family. He spent the war in captivity, at the Schlosberg prison in Graz.

He was politically active – for over thirty years, he actively participated in the labour movement and fought for national and labour rights.

He was married to Albert Einstein's aunt, Adolfine Kaufler.

He died in Graz, Austria.

== Professor, scholar, academic ==
In 1912, he became an associate professor, and after his captivity in 1921 he was a full professor at the University of Belgrade and the director of the Jevremovac Botanical Institute and Botanical Garden. In the school year 1927/28 he served as the Dean of the Faculty of Philosophy. He examined the origin of Dajic Lake on Golija, together with Josif Pančić and Jovan Cvijić. He has written monographs on Lake Dajic and Vlasina Lake (1910).

He initiated the publication of the Gazette of the Botanical Institute and Botanical Gardens, which collaborated with over 90 botanical institutions worldwide. He described many new plant species on his own or in collaboration with prominent botanists in the world, and foreign and domestic researchers named newly discovered plant species after him out of respect for his work. After the "Josif Pančić era", his work marked the epoch (1918–1934) in the development of botany in the country, known as the "Košanin era".

== Works ==
- Geografija balkanskich ramondija (1921)
- Četinari južne Srbije (1925)
- Elementi vlasinske flore (1910)
- Spisak koleoptera u Muzeju srpske zemlje (1904)
- Vegetacija planine Jakupice u Makedoniji (1911)

== Note ==
The standard author citation Košanin is used to indicate this person as the author when citing a botanical name.

== See also ==
- Josif Pančić
- Sava Petrović
- Lujo Adamović
- August Kanitz

== Cited works ==
- Сарић, Милоје (1997). Сарић, Милоје (ed.). Живот и дело српских научника - Недељко Кошанин (1874—1934) (PDF). Београд: САНУ. ISBN 978-86-7025-256-1. Archived from the original (PDF) on 2015-02-20.
- Петровић, Бојан (2011). Радојевић, Душан (ed.). "Великани науке (2)". Симбиоза онлајн. 11. Београд: Студентски парламент Биолошког факултета, Универзитет у Београду. ISSN 2334-8739.
- Поповић, Д (1925). Станојевић, Станоје (ed.). Народна енциклопедија српско-хрватско-словеначка (књига 2 И-М). Загреб: Библиографски завод д. д.
- Кнежевић, Милија Ј., ed. (2006). Биографски Лексикон Златиборског округа, Београд 2006“. издавач: Удружење Ужичана у Београду, главни и одговорни уредник:. Београд: Удружење Ужичана. ISBN 978-86-909267-0-1.
- Матић, Бранслав (2017). "Биљни архив планете". Национална ревија. 61. Београд: Принцип прес д.о.о. ISSN 1452-6905.
- Протић, Емилијан (2011). Попов, Чедомир (ed.). Српски биографски речник (5, Кв-Мао). Нови Сад. ISBN 978-86-7946-085-1.
- Миленовић, Миомир; Тановић, Јован, eds. (1934-03-23). "Др Недељко Кошанин професор Београдског универзитета". Политика. 9287. Београд.
