= Sava Petrović (botanist) =

Father of Serbian botany

Сава Петровић
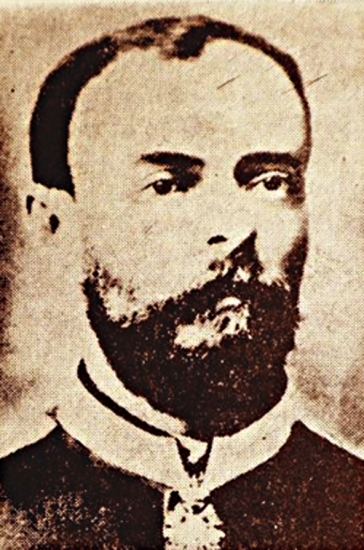
- Sava Petrović
- Born: January 14, 1839; Šabac, Principality of Serbia
- Died: January 20, 1889 (aged 50); Belgrade, Kingdom of Serbia
- Citizenship: Serbian
- Education: University of Paris
- Known for: discovery of several species unknown to science, co-founder of Serbian Medical Society
- Scientific career
- Author abbrev. (botany): Petrovič

Sava Petrović (1839 – 1889) was a Serbian botanist and Doctor of Medicine. He is considered to be one of the most important Serbian botanists of the 19th century. Petrović was active in phyto-pharmacology, botany and medicine simultaneously, writing and publishing numerous scientific works. He is also remembered as a co-founder, like many of his peers, of the Srpsko lekarsko društvo (Serbian Medical Society) in 1872. Also the same year his book "Medicinal Herbs"was published.

== Biography ==
Petrović was born in Šabac, then part of the Principality of Serbia, on 14 January 1839. There he completed grade school and started high school. After moving to Belgrade he finished gymnasium and received a bachelor degree at the science–mathematics faculty of the Lyceum of the Principality of Serbia, an equivalent to École normale supérieure. Professor Josif Pančić noticed him and tried to encourage him in every way possible. With Dr. Pančić's help, Petrović was awarded a state scholarship to study medicine and surgery in France. On 23 November 1866, Petrović successfully defended his doctoral thesis—De la Nostomanie—at the prestigious Faculty of Medicine in Paris.

Upon his return home in 1867, he went on to become a district physician in Kruševac. Under the aegis of Dr. Josif Pančić, Petrović started to collect and systematize the wild herbs from the vicinity of Kruševac. In the winter of 1867, he was transferred to Belgrade to a military hospital where he soon reached the rank of colonel, the highest post that a Serbian military physician could aspire to achieve at the time.

On 27 May 1872, Petrović and fifteen other prominent Belgrade physicians established the Serbian Medical Society.

In 1873 Milan Obrenović invited Dr. Petrović to his court and made him his personal physician. It was Milan who urged Dr. Petrović to start floristic investigation in the area of Niš. Based on the result of these studies, Petrović wrote two comprehensive books—“Flora of the Neighbourhood of Niš” in 1882, and in 1885 the Supplement—Addimenia ad floram agri nyssani (Supplement to the Flora of the Neighbourhood of Niš).

In the first work, Dr. Petrović cited more than 100 families, 502 genera and around 1,500 plant species, including 60 new for the flora of Serbia and five completely new for science. The most prominent among them is Ramonda nathaliae, named after Queen Natalija, wife of his good friend King Milan Obrenović.

In the “Supplement", Dr. Petrović cited 160 plants as new for the flora of the vicinity of Niš, though many of them were also new for science. In addition, he made corrections to some of the evident errors in the first book.

Sava Petrović was the first scientist in Serbia to collect and study medicinal plants. His “Medicinal Plants of Serbia” (1883) shows fully his dedication to pharmacognosis and his contribution.

He was instrumental in establishing the present-day Botanical Garden Jevremovacin Belgrade while supporting other botanical gardens with saplings grown in Belgrade.

He died on 20 January 1889, and was buried at Belgrade New Cemetery.

== Legacy ==
Petrović’s legacy in botanical work is enormous. While collecting and studying flora in the vicinity of Niš, he scientifically described many plants taxa new for science which are still considered valid, while there are taxa that have kept their original names without any change: Genista, Nonea, Hypericum, Cyanus, Edraianthus, Orobanche, Psilocybe serbica, Tandonia serbica, Tulipa serbica, Ramonda serbica, Ramonda nathaliae, Primula, Hypochaeris radicata. His contributions to the List of Balkan endemic plants are many.

In 1996, professors and students from University of Niš Faculty of Science and Mathematics at Department for Biology and Ecology founded Biological Society “Dr Sava Petrović” in honor of Sava Petrović.

== See also ==
- August Kanitz
- Josif Pančić
- Nedeljko Košanin
- Lujo Adamović

== External Sources ==
Botanical Necrology for 1889
