= Antonije Arnojev Arnot =

Serbian educational theorist and reformer

Antonije Arnojev Arnot (22 July 1808 in Szeged – 23 September 1841 in Budapest) was a Serbian educational theorist and reformer. He was a lawyer by profession who also worked as a translator, writer, publisher, publicist, and professor at lyceums in both Kragujevac and in Belgrade.He is regarded as one of the most prominent Serbian scholars in the first half of the 19th century.

== Biography ==
He finished elementary school and high school in Szeged. He then enrolled at the Evangelical Lyceum in Kežmarok in Slovakia at the age of 17, where he studied law and philosophy for two years, from 1825 to 1827, then he pursued post-graduate studies in jurisprudence at Pest, which he completed in 1831. As a student, he began to pursue literary work. He co-authored the "Matica Srpska Chronicle" (1831-1834), where he published poetry and prose, original and translated poems, epitaphs, epigrams, sentiments, fables, short stories, as well as articles on history, philosophy, and the natural sciences.

From 1831 he worked as an attorney in Budapest. In the same year he married Jelisaveta Krajić, with whom he had a son Lazar.

It was in Budapest that Arnot launched his own newspaper-magazine. He published and edited the "Serbian Newspaper or Magazine for Arts, Literature and Fashion", which ran from 1838 to 1839. Then, his colleague Atanasije Nikolić from university days convinced him to leave Pest and move to Serbia in early 1839. There he was appointed professor at the Lyceum of the Principality of Serbia in Kragujevac where he taught physics and other subjects for a semester. Afterward, he moved to the Belgrade Lyceum to take over the teaching post of Konstantin Branković. During his tenure, he founded school libraries, introduced new scholastic subjects, and standards for school hygiene. He showed great interest in educational issues and wrote school textbooks.

On 23 September 1841, he died of consumption while visiting friends in Buda.
