= Konstantin Branković =

Serbian pedagogue and publicist

Konstantin (Kosta) Branković (25 May 1814 — 22 November 1865) was a Serbian pedagogue and publicist from the Kingdom of Hungary. He was one of the first six-member tutorial staff at the Lyceum of the Principality of Serbia in Kragujevac before Belgrade became the capital city and a new Lyceum was opened there.

== Biography ==
He was born in Novi Sad (Újvidék), then part of the Kingdom of Hungary. He finished high school in Novi Sad, philosophy in Szeged, and law in Pest. At the end of 1839, he was appointed professor at the Lyceum, where he was rector four times (1841/42, 1846/47, 1851-1853, and 1859-1863).

He was also among the first founding members of the Society of Serbian Letters and on several occasions its secretary and vice-president. In philosophy, he belonged to the Kantian direction, along with Jovan Stejić, Mihailo Ristić, and Mihailo V. Vujić. In 1848, as a member of the Main Board in Sremski Karlovci, he sent letters to the Serbian newspaper. From 1854 until his death he taught logic, physics, psychology, philosophy and pedagogy at the Lyceum that became Belgrade's Velika škola.

In 1856, he was the editor of Šumadinka, and from 1859, he was the state censor of books and newspapers.

He is best known for his two major works, "Elementary Philosophy (Osnovno mudroslovlje) and "Logic" (Misloslovlje ili logika). In both of his books, he credits the relevant works of Wilhelm Traugott Krug, whom he translated.

== Bibliography ==
- Prirodoslovlje ili fizika za mladež / Physics for Youngsters, Belgrade, 1842 and 1850:
- Misloslovlje ili logika za mladež / Ponderings or Logic for Youngsters, Belgrade, 1849;
- Pismena sočinenija I и II / Written Works I and II, Belgrade, 1850 and 1860;
- Osnovno mudroslovlje za slušatelje Velike škole / Basic Wisdom for Velika škola students, Belgrade, 1851;
- Misloslovlje ili logika za prvogodišnje slušatelje mudroslovlja u Liceumu Knjažestva Srbskog / Logic for first-year students at the Lyceum of the Principality of Serbia, Belgrade, 1851.

== See also ==
- Jovan Sterija Popović
- Đuro Daničić
- Josif Pančić
- Matija Ban
- Dimitrije Nešić
- Atanasije Nikolić
- Antonije Arnojev Arnot
