= Lujo Adamović =

Serbian botanist (1864–1935)

Lujo Adamović (Serbian Cyrillic: Лујо Адамовић; 31 July 1864 – 19 July 1935) was a Serbian botanist and plant collector who was a leading authority regarding the genus Hieracium, recognized by the Food and Agriculture Organization of the United Nations.

== Life ==
Adamović was born in Rovinj (Rovigno), Istria, Austrian Empire, where his father Vicko Adamović was on a short term of service, and grew up in Dubrovnik. He received his education in Belgrade (1888), Vienna and in Berlin (1898), where he wrote his Ph.D. dissertation entitled Die Vegetationsverhaltnisse Ostserbiens. His professors were Anton Kerner von Marilaun and Adolf Engler.

After graduation, Adamović worked as a Royal Serbian School Board high school teacher in the various towns in southern Serbia, such as Zaječar, Pirot, Gornji Milanovac and Vranje. From 1901 to 1905 Adamović was director of the Jevremovac Botanical Garden of the University of Belgrade. He lived temporarily in Vienna and Italy. Adamović was a private lecturer in phytogeography at the University of Vienna. In 1907, as an associate member of the Yugoslav Academy of Science and Arts and Sciences in Zagreb, he published papers on the flora of Dalmatia, Herzegovina, Serbia and Montenegro.

== Scientific work ==
Adamović mainly dealt with the vegetation of the Balkan Peninsula. In his time he was one of the best experts in the vegetation and flora of Southeast Europe and has written fundamental works on the subject. In the mentor Richard Wettstein, he had an important advocate for his research stays in the regions of the Danube lowlands, Romania, Macedonia, Bulgaria, Thrace, Thessaly, as well as the Apennine Peninsula, through which he got a comprehensive knowledge of the plant formations of Southeast Europe and the Mediterranean region. In particular, his knowledge of the flora and vegetation of Dalmatia, Bosnia, and Herzegovina, Montenegro and Albania were fundamental. Adamović coined the terms Šibljak and pseudomacchie for shrubbery formations of these karst countries of the Dinarides, which have found their way into the terminology of vegetation geography.

From 1896 to 1910, he was the editor of the exsiccata work "Plantae balcanicae exsiccatae". Adamović made valuable contributions to Volume 11, "The Vegetation Conditions of the Balkans" (1909), and also contributions involving Hieracium towards Adolf Engler and Carl Georg Oscar Drude's Die Vegetation der Erde or "The Vegetation of the Earth."

Adamović's most important floristic work was the processing of the flora of Montenegro (Građa za floru kraljevine Crne Gore), which was not mentioned in Czech botanist Joseph Rohlena's Conspectus Florae montenegrinae or in August von Hayek's Prodromus Florae Peninsulae Balcanicae. Between 1905 and 1911 Adamović made various trips for this flora of Montenegro, collecting several times on the Orjen, Komovi and Durmitor around 1000 documents of the flora of the southeastern Dinaric region. Adamović was the only botanist in Montenegro after Josif Pančić to collect plants again on the Velika Jastrebica in the Bijela gora. He published more than 60 scientific papers and books and described some new plant species and taxa.>

After retirement, he returned to Dubrovnik, where he died in 1935, at the time of the Kingdom of Yugoslavia.

Today Lujo Adamović is considered one of stellar botanist of Serbia of the 19th and 20th century, including Josif Pančić, Sava Petrović, Sava Hilandarac, Nedeljko Košanin, Teodor Soška, and others.

== Major works ==
The most significant work in his opus is—The Vegetation Conditions of the Balkans (Die Vegetationsverhältnisse der Balkanländer, 1909 & 1916)—now considered one of the classic works of the science of vegetation formations. Also important are:

- Die pflanzengeographische Stellung und Gliederung Italiens/The geographical position and structure of Italy, 1933
- Revisio glumacearum Serbicarum, 1930
- Vegetationsbilder aus Dalmatien/Pictures of vegetation from Dalmatia, 1904
- Die Verbreitung der Holzgewächse in den dinarischen Ländern/The spread of woody plants in the Dinaric countries, 1910 & 1913
- Vegetationsbilder aus Mazedonien/Vegetation pictures from Macedonia, 1913
- De la végétation du sud de la Serbie/The Vegetation of southern Serbia, 1909

The standard author abbreviation Adamović is used to indicate this person as the author when citing a botanical name.

== See also ==
- Nedeljko Košanin
- Sava Petrović
- Josif Pančić
- August Kanitz
