= Vuk Marinković =

Serbian physicist

Vuk Marinković (Novi Sad, Austria-Hungary, 24 December 1807 – Belgrade, Principality of Serbia, 7 August 1859) was a Serbian physician, pedagogue and linguist, professor and rector of the Lyceum (Belgrade). He is credited as the founder of modern physics in Serbia.

== Biography ==
He was born on 24 December 1807, in Novi Sad, to father Kosta, a priest and educator. He had three brothers: Pavle, Maksim, and Dimitrije and three sisters Anastasia, Hristina and Juliana. He finished elementary school in Novi Sad. He attended the Serbian Orthodox High School in Novi Sad, where he finished the sixth grade. While attending high school, Pavel Jozef Šafárik came, as a professor and director. He finished the seventh and eighth grades of high school, that is, philosophy, in Eger. Then he studied medicine at the universities of Pest and Vienna from 1826 to 1830. He received his doctorate in Pest, defending his dissertation Dissertatio inauguralis medica de epilepsia, in 1830. He was 23.

After finishing his studies, he returned to Novi Sad, where he opened a private medical practice. He enjoyed a great reputation in society. He married Sofia, the daughter of the wealthy Jovan Pavlović. He worked there until the revolution of 1848-49. After the bombing and destruction of Novi Sad, in June 1849, Marinković went to Serbia, where he was appointed professor at the Lyceum of the Principality of Serbia.

At the Belgrade Lyceum, he began teaching Elementary Physics in 1849. On 7 July 1849 Dr. Marinković replaced Janko Šafarik as the Chair of Physics, a post he would hold until his death on 7 August 1859. Within physics, he also taught chemistry until 1854 when he turned it into an independent subject.

In the ten years at the Lyceum, he served as rector for 1850/51, 1856/57, 1857/58 and 1858/59.

He was a regular member of the Society Of Serbian Letters beginning 8 January 1850.

Marinković laid the foundations of scientific terminology in the field of physics and chemistry in the Serbian language. Thanks to him, both physics and chemistry became compulsory subjects.

At the age of 19, dissatisfied with the translation from Latin, which was done by Miloš Svetić before him, Marinković translated the second book "Aeneid", by the Roman writer Virgil. He authored the "Natural History: for Serbian Youth", which was widely used as a textbook in high schools and lyceums until the appearance of textbooks by Josif Pančić and "Principles of Physics" as the first higher education textbook of physics in Serbia, both printed 1851. He also wrote "Močnik's Geometry", but it printed without the author's name.

Vuk Marinković died in Belgrade on 7 August 1859 and was buried near the Church of St. Mark in Belgrade.

He was of small stature, round face, bulging eyes, rigid movements. While he was talking, he was constantly coughing and shaking his right shoulder. As not a single picture of him was preserved during his lifetime because the ones he had in Novi Sad were lost in the fire, and after arriving in Belgrade he was no longer photographed, on his deathbed was photographed by his friend and photographer Anastas Jovanović. Based on the photograph, together with the descriptions given by the family and his students, his character is painted.

== Literature ==
- Petar V. Vučo, Life and work of Vuk Marinković, editor M. S. Dimitrijević, Publication of the Society, No. 13, Astronomical Society "Ruđer Bošković", Belgrade, 2014
- Dušan Popović, Narodna enciklopedija srpsko-hrvatsko-slovenačka, broj 2, I-M, urednik Stanoje Stanojević, Biobliografski zavod d. d., Zagreb, 1928, p. 789
- Famous Serbs of the 19th century, book 3, editor Andra Gavrilović, Naklada i štampa Srpske štamparije (dd), Zagreb, 1904.
- Milan Ђ. Milićević, Pomenik znamenitihi ljudi srpskog naroda novijega doba, Srpska kraljevska štamparija, Belgrade, 1888.
- Natural History (for Serbian youth), Natural History Museum, Belgrade
- Rectors of the Lyceum, High School and University of Belgrade, University of Belgrade
- L J. Никић, Г. Жујовић, Г. Radojčić-Kostić, Materials for the Biographical Dictionary of the Members of the Society of Serbian Literature, the * Serbian Scholarly Society and the Serbian Royal Academy (1841—1947), edited by Nikša Stipčević, Serbian Academy of Sciences and Arts, Belgrade, 2007, p. 358
- В. Aleksijević: Contemporaries and Consequences of Dositej Obradovic and Vuk Stef. Karadzic: bio-bibliographic material. The manuscript is kept in the Department of Special Funds of the National Library in Belgrade. Ρ 425/6 (V. Aleksijević).
- Enciklopedija Novi Sad 14 (1999) 30–31.
- Lexicon of Yugoslav Writers, Novi Sad 4, 121–122.
