= Franz Janke =

Slovak architect (1790 – c. 1860

- Born: 1790
- Died: 1860 (aged 69–70)
- Occupation: Architect

FranzJanke (also Franc Janke; 1790 – c. 1860) was a Slovak engineer and architect active in Serbia. He was invited to Serbia by the City of Belgrade's Public Works department to design new, contemporary buildings in the style befitting Serbia in the 1830s.

== Career ==
Shortly after a Hatt-i Humayun (also known as Hatti-sherif) in 1830 and gaining some independence from the Ottoman Empire, Prince Miloš Obrenović realized that the local staff could not realize his idea of a new city, so he asked for help from a citizen of Imperial Austria. The first "government engineer" was Slovak Franz Janke. Janke came from Vienna on the recommendation of Cvetko Rajović, the then-mayor of Belgrade. He drawn up the regulation plan of Kruševac which was realised in 1834–1836. Janke stayed in Serbia for nine years in the most difficult times of its renewal. He was fired during the politically charged dynastic changes in 1839. The continued prevalence of Western architectural concepts in Serbia has been credited to him. He is credited with the cathedral, Đumrukana (Customs House) in Karađorđeva Street demolished during World War II, the first building in Belgrade in the spirit of classicism, then the facade of the State Council in Ulica Kraljice Natalije 29, also demolished, the house of Cvetko Rajović, later Realka High School Building (or Realschule) on the corner Uzun-Mirkova and Tadeuša Košćuška, and the urban plan of the wider area around the corner of Kralja Milana and Kneza Miloša. Cvetko Rajović's house is the first residential building in Belgrade built under the influence of Western-style, expertly and with a rich facade decoration.

Other architects soon followed him such as Czech-born Jan Nevole, German-born Johann Franzel, Italian-born Josif Kasano, Nikola Živković, Atanasije Nikolić, Filip Hristović, Pavle Djakonović, Konstantin Radotić, Janja Mihajlović, Nikola Jovanović, Jovan Ristić, Kosta Šreplović, Andrea Andrejević, Andrija Vuković, etc.
