= Đumrukana =

Theatre in Belgrade, Serbia

Teatar na đumruku
- Театар на ђумруку
- Ђумрукана / Đumrukana
- Interactive map of Teatar na đumruku
- Address: 13 Karađorđeva Street; Belgrade; Serbia
- Coordinates: 44.818104°N 20.449853°E
- Owner: City of Belgrade
- Capacity: 250
- Current use: demolished planned reconstruction in 2020

Construction
- Built: 1835
- Opened: 19 November 1841 (unofficial); 16 December 1841 (official)
- Closed: 1 September 1842
- Demolished: 1944; damaged in bombing 1945; demolished
- Years active: 1841 - 1842
- Architect: Hadži-Neimar

Theatre on Đumruk, or Đumrukana (Serbian Cyrillic: Ђумрукана), was a theatre in Belgrade, the capital of Serbia. Originally a customs house which was built in 1835 near Belgrade docks in the neighborhood of Savamala, it was adapted into the theater, as a first regular Belgrade theater house, which was active 1841–1842.

== Customs house ==
The Đumrukana building (from Turkish gümrük), was the very first administrative building built in the newly autonomous Principality of Serbia from the Ottoman Empire and as such was a symbol of the liberated country.

The building was designed by modern Serbian building pioneer Nikola Živković (known as Hadži-Neimar), perhaps under the guide of Franz Janke, the first state engineer of the Principality of Serbia. It was built around 1835, and was one of the first objects outside of the Belgrade Fortress built completely from solid building materials (brick and stone). The object was located close to the Sava Gate, one of the outer gates of the Lower Town of the fortress. On the day of opening, the building was blessed, and attendees included ruling prince Miloš Obrenović and foreign representatives.

The building was described as a "spacious warehouse with arcades". One of the foreign consuls described the building as being divided with one part being described as "a theatre", while the other had a series of storage rooms, mostly packed with leather. The object was 52 m (171 ft) long, with large arches standing on Tuscan Doric columns. The main facade was of monumental composition with 11 arcades and ceiling with cruciform cove.

In 1837, it was recorded that jurist Jovan Hadžić and mayor of Zemun, Vasa Lazarević, lived in the building. They both were given a task of drafting the first Serbian civil code by prince Miloš.

The building is connected to the first attempt at flying in Serbia. Blacksmith's apprentice named Manojlo, self-taught in aeronautics, constructed his own flying contraption combining the "bat wing" construction and small parachute. In the winter of 1841 he tried to fly over the Sava, jumping from the roof of Đumrukana. Attempt was a failure, but the ill-fated "Serbian Icarus" was saved by the parachute and the deep snow in which he fell.

== Theatre ==
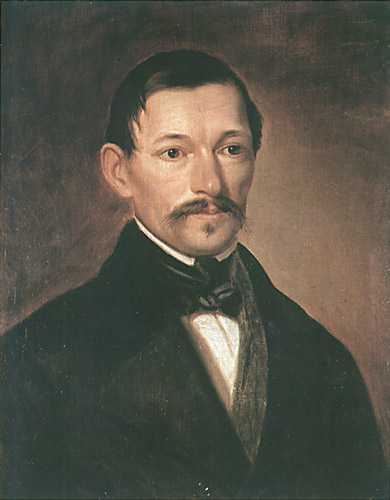
Jovan Sterija Popović, one of the founders of the Đumrukana theatre

Đumrukana was later the location of the first Belgrade's regular theatre in 1841, as prior to that only travelling acting troops existed. Main people behind theatre's establishment were comedy writer Jovan Sterija Popović and educator Atanasije Nikolić. They both were teachers at the Lyceum of the Principality of Serbia in Kragujevac, capital of Serbia at that time. They founded a theatre in Kragujevac 1840, but a year later, both capital and the Lyceum were transferred to Belgrade. Original idea for the new theatre was Nikolić's and Sterija joined him. They were backed by the prince Mihailo Obrenović who agreed to partially support the theatre financially thru state subsidy. He also ordered for the storage hall in Đumurkana, at the time one of the largest buildings in Belgrade, to be adapted to suite the theatre. The hall had 250 seats. Apart from the regular seats, there were 6 loges for the affluent spectators. Contrary to the regular seats, they were expensive: "one imperial ducat per loge".

The first performance held at the venue actually occurred before its official openings, on 19 November [O.S. 7 November] 1841. Nikolić adapted his own play, after the folk epic Kraljević Marko i Arapin. The "dilettante" acting troop was made of students, amateur actors, from the Lyceum. Music for the play was composed by Jožef Šlezinger.

The add was then published in the Novine Serbske (predecessor of the modern state gazette), by which the theatre administration was inviting actors ("we invite anynone who is skilled in this craft, or who senses enough capability in himself for this"). They also asked for two actresses which had to be good singers, too. Very good salaries, 12 to 25 thalers, were promised. Each applicant had to undergo the selecting process, which consisted of several rehearsals. Numerous actors from Serbian diaspora in Austrian Empire applied for the job, mostly educated in Zagreb or Hungary.

The theatre was officially opened on 16 December [O.S. 4 December] 1841 with the first performance being Death of Stefan Dečanski by Sterija. It was the first public theatrical play in Belgrade (previous theatres in Kragujevac were the royal ones), for which the "theatrical list was published", and which was open for everyone as the prices were affordable. Performances were held regularly on Thursdays and Sundays. The first play with the fully professional acting ensemble was held on 10 March [O.S. 26 February] 1842.

Other performances included further works by Sterija (Tvrdica (or Kir Janja), Ženidba i udadba, Zla žena, Prevara za prevaru, Ajduci, Simpatija i antipatija, Pokondirena tikva), Stefan Stefanović (Smrt Uroša Petog), etc. Also, foreign plays were translated and performed, including those of Molière (Scapin the Schemer), Carlo Goldoni (La bottega del caffè), Victor Hugo (Hernani, Angelo, Tyrant of Padua), August von Kotzebue (Die Brandschatzung, The Jealous Wife [Kotzebue's adaptation of George Colman the Elder's play]), Friedrich Schiller (The Robbers). It was recorded that the shows were almost always full. The general taste of Belgrade audience for the theatrical life was also cultured by the critics, like Sterija, Vladislav Stojadinović and Pavle Popović. They mostly published their critiques in the Novine Serbske. In total, until 1 September [O.S. 20 August] 1842 when the final performance was held, 55 plays, both Serbian and foreign, were performed.

In September 1842 prince Mihailo Obrenović was dethroned and went into exile, after the Vučić Rebellion, organized by Toma Vučić Perišić and the Defenders of the Constitution. The theatre held no further productions.

== Later developments ==
For a while, Austrian consulate and Austrian post office were also located in the building. In the early 20th century, State Customs office again moved in.

The building was damaged during the massive 1944 Allied Easter bombing of Belgrade in World War II. After the war, it was completely demolished in 1945 during the city's clearing off from the rubble.

== Today ==
The foundations of the buildings are preserved, though they are buried after the latter works along the bank. During the 2010s reconstructions in the area, it was announced that the Đumrukana will be rebuilt on its old foundations and made some unspecified cultural institution.

The architectural design competition for the new building was announced in August 2019. The new building is envisioned as the first permanent seat for the National Ensemble of Folk Dances and Songs of Serbia "Kolo", founded in 1948. The lot of former Đumrukana covers 0.30 ha (0.74 acres) and is located next to the staircase which connects the neighborhoods of Kosančićev Venac and Savamala ("Great Staircase", Velike stepenice). Stipulations for the project include: floor area of 11,500 m^{2} (124,000 sq ft) at most, main hall, gallery and museum section, gift shop, big central stage with 400 seats, another multipurpose hall, roof terrace with café, underground garage and other auxiliary rooms.

In terms of architecture itself, one of the objectives for the architects is that the new building has to "revive the memory" on former Đumrukana. Also, the project must preserve the panoramic view of the Kosančićev Venac neighborhood above the building, which, with the neighboring Belgrade Fortress, Karađorđeva Street and the Sava dockage, makes the "most valuable and most representative image of Belgrade", which has already been "under the attack" of the aggressive construction. If the procedures go as planned, the construction could start by the end of 2020. The neighboring parcel, at 15 and 15-a Karađoređeva Street, is also part of the same competition, though only as an optional one. The object on the 0.28 ha (0.69 acres) lot is also conceived as an object of culture. A total of 17 works were submitted. Design by the Zabriski bureau, headed by Milka Gnjato, won the first prize.

The selected project turned out to be unpopular. It was disliked for not resembling the old Đumrukana building at all, and for not fitting into the urban surrounding. By March 2022 it was still undecided what the object would look like (selected modern design or restoration of the old appearance) or what will be the purpose (ensemble "Kolo" or alternative theatrical groups).

== Assessment ==
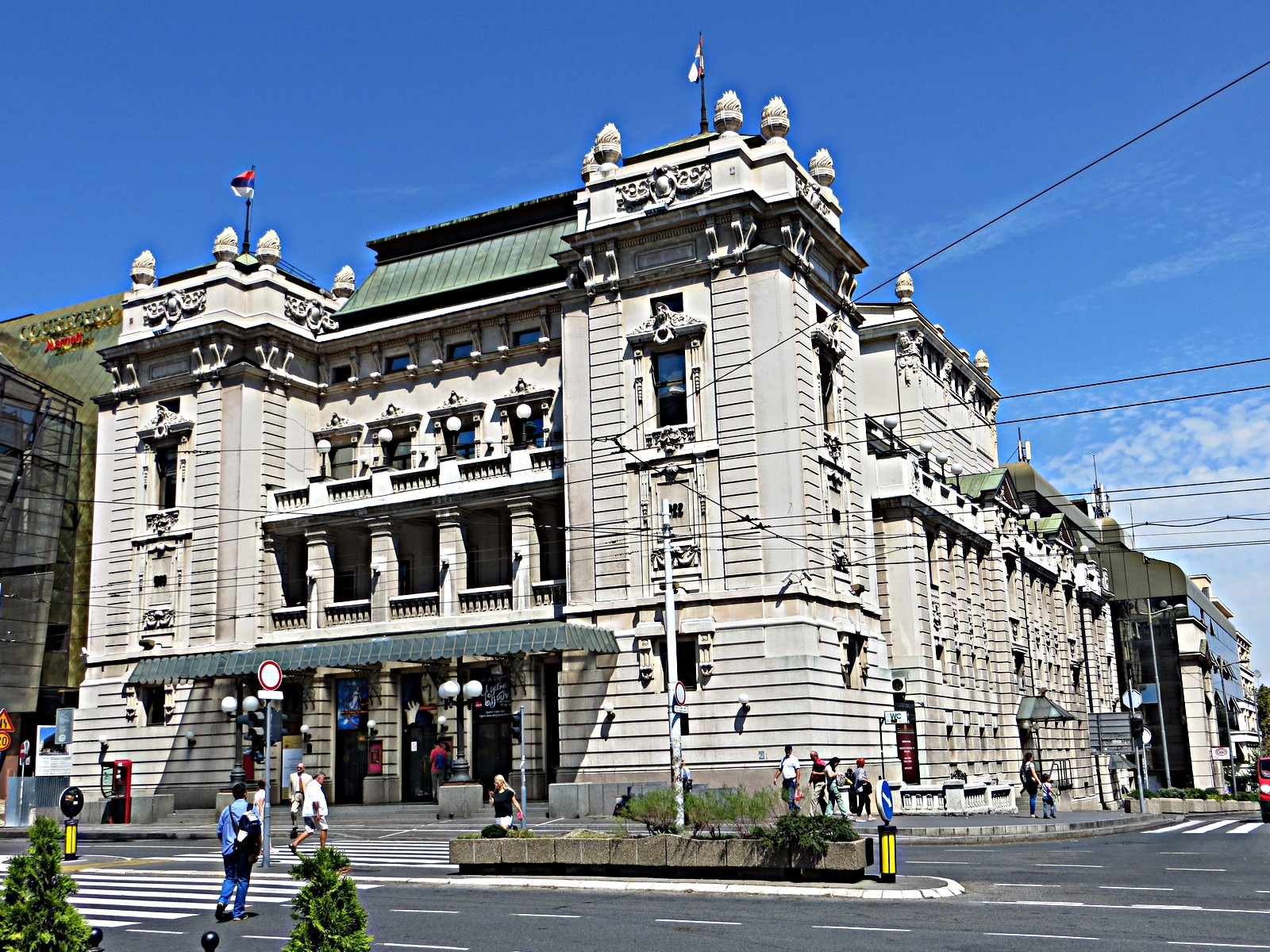
In 1869, 27 years after Đumrukana, the next permanent theatre was built. National Theatre in Belgrade, at the modern Republic Square

Though lasting for only one year, the existence of the Đumrukana Theatre is considered pivotal for the development of theatrical life in Serbia. It held titles of numerous "firsts" among theatres in Serbia: first permanent, first with a repertoire, first state owned, first national. First with professional ensemble, which soon replaced the amateur one from the start period of the theatre. First with the regular, citizen audience. It pushed further the development of dramatic literature in Serbia, which, oddly, pre-existed the first theatre.

The theatre formed holdings of the sets, props and costumes which were used as the base in the further attempts to start new theatres. Marking 100th anniversary of the theatre, Borivoje Jevtić wrote: "It was a miracle and remains a miracle...the seed sprouted!". He noted that in Serbia at the time, literature, music and visual arts were still not developed, but the most complex art, which encompasses all of them, was.

Theatrical life moved to the building of Staro Zdanje, in Kosančićev Venac, above the Đumrukana, from May 1848 to March 1849. Next object used for this purpose, after 1850, was also close to Đumrukana and also built by Nikola Živković, the Prince's Brewery at the corner of modern Gavrila Principa, Balkanska and Admirala Geprata streets. Owned by the Princess Ljubica Obrenović, and later by the Vajfert family, the building was demolished in 1935.

Operational boards for the construction of the new theatre were founded in 1852, 1861 and 1863, but they all failed. After another failed attempt at the construction of the theatre in the unsuitable area of Zeleni Venac, which actually began but was abandoned, the new building of the National Theatre in Belgrade was finally finished in 1869.

== See also ==
- List of theatres in Serbia
