= August Kanitz =

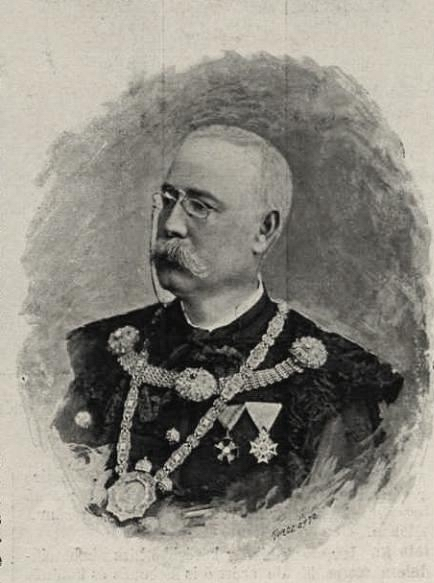
August Kanitz

August Kanitz (25 April 1843, in Lugos – 12 July 1896, in Kolozsvár) was a Hungarian botanist.

While a student at the University of Vienna he wrote Geschichte der Botanik in Ungarn (Hanover and Budapest, 1863), and soon after, Versuch einer Geschichte der Ungarischen Botanik (Halle, 1865). In 1866 he published a work on the flora of Slavonia, in 1877 he published a work on the flora of Montenegro, Bosnia, and Serbia and in 1879 one on that of Romania. For the last-named work he was elected (1880) a member of the Hungarian Academy of Sciences, and was made Knight of the Order of the Crown of Romania. He converted to Christianity.

In 1872 Kanitz was appointed professor of botany at the Franz Joseph University. In 1877 he founded the Magyar Növénytani Lapok (Hungarian Journal of Botany), which he edited until 1892.

== See also ==
- Josif Pančić
- Sava Petrović
- Nedeljko Košanin
