= Bački Brestovac =

Bački Brestovac Бачки Брестовац (Serbian)
- Village (Selo)
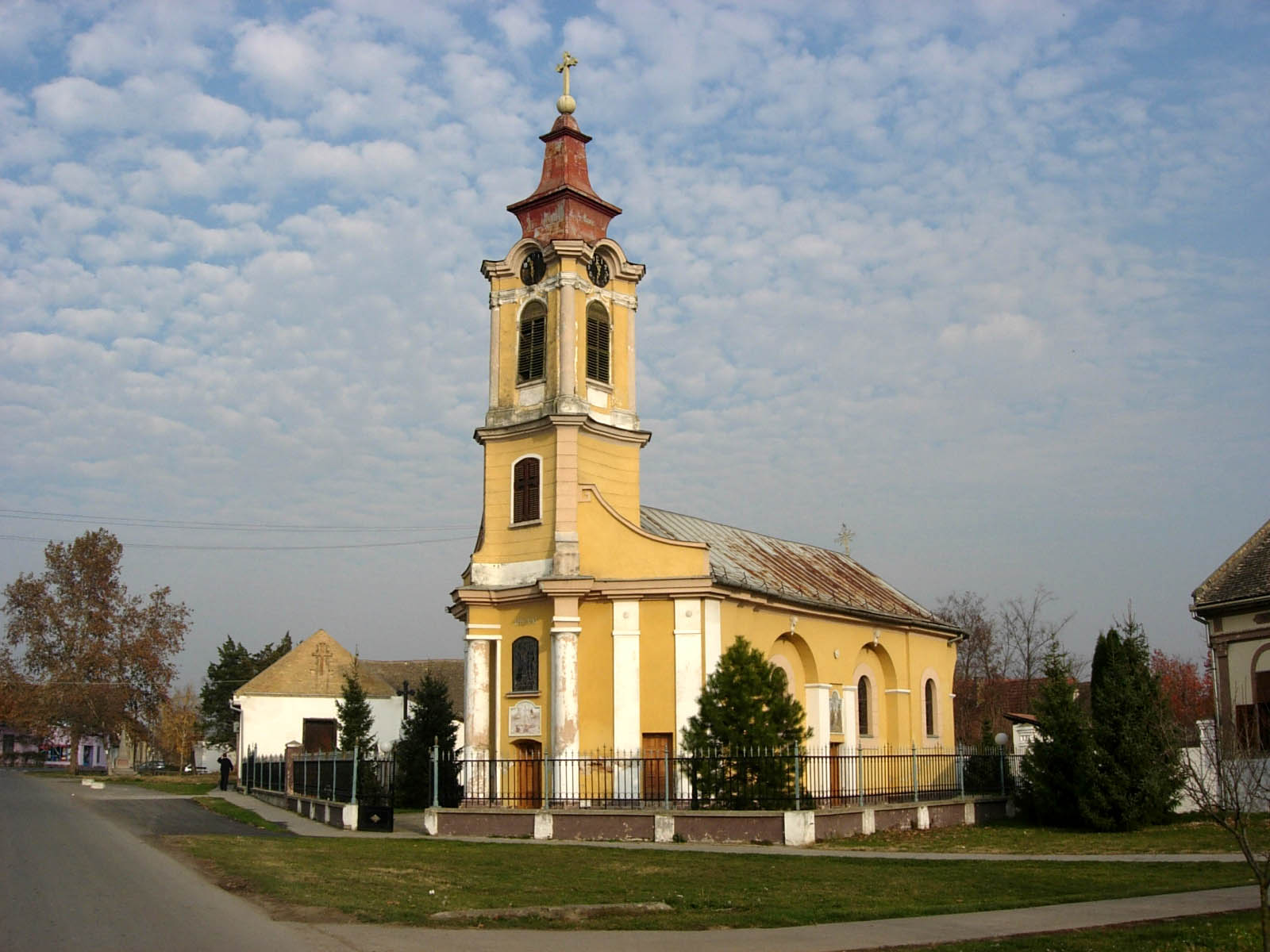
- The Orthodox church.

- Location within Vojvodina Location within Serbia Location within Europe
- Coordinates: 45°37′N 19°16′E
- Country: Serbia
- Province: Vojvodina
- Region: Bačka
- District: West Bačka
- Municipality: Odžaci

Population (2002)
  - Total: 3,469
- Time zone: UTC+1 (CET)
  - Summer (DST): UTC+2 (CEST)

Bački Brestovac (Serbian Cyrillic: Бачки Брестовац) is a village in Serbia. It is situated in the Odžaci municipality, in the West Bačka District, Vojvodina province. The village has a Serb ethnic majority and its population numbering 3,469 people (2002 census).

== Name ==
Names in other languages: Hungarian: Szilberek, German: Ulmenau.

== Historical population ==
National structure (2002)
1. Serbs (89.4%)
2. Romani (1.00%)
3. Others (2.81%)
4. Unknown (6.80%)
- 1961: 5,226
- 1971: 4,589
- 1981: 3,876
- 1991: 3,737

== Notable residents ==
- Atanasije Nikolić

== See also ==
- List of places in Serbia
- List of cities, towns and villages in Vojvodina

== Gallery ==
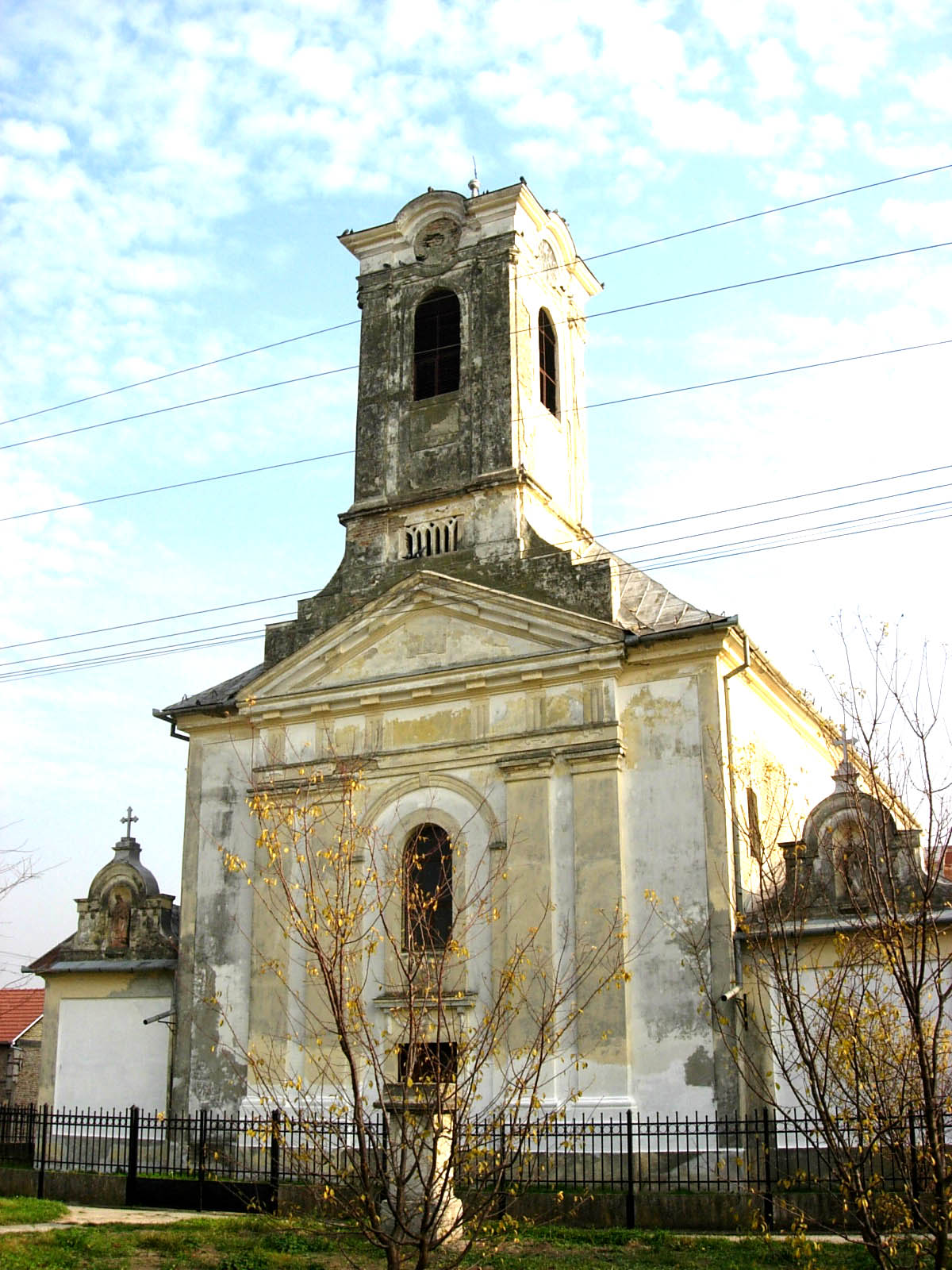
Name of the Blessed Virgin Mary Catholic Church

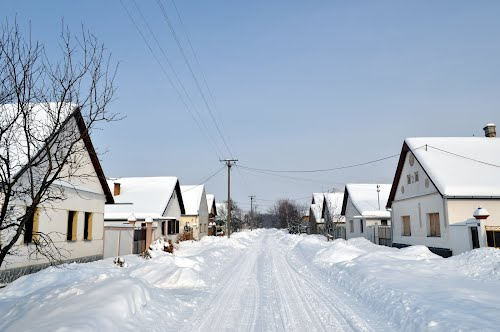
Bački Brestovac in winter

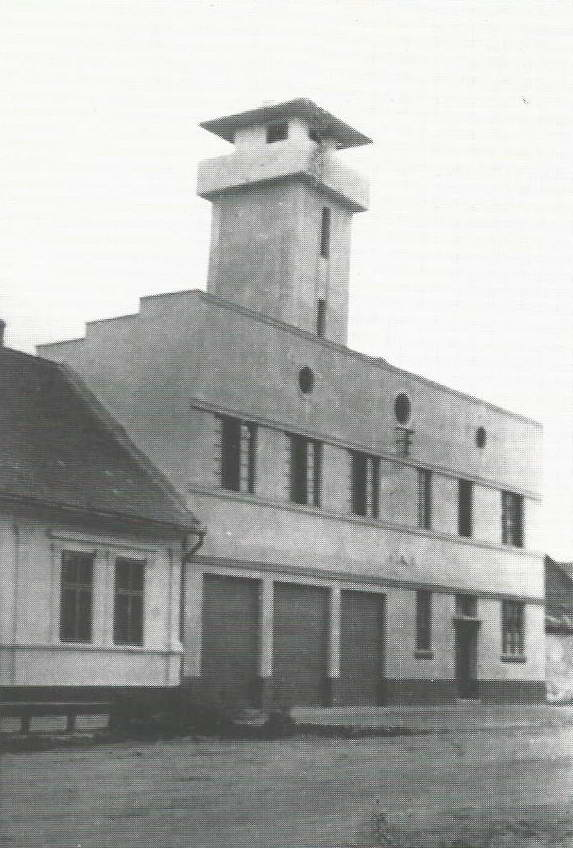
Fire Station

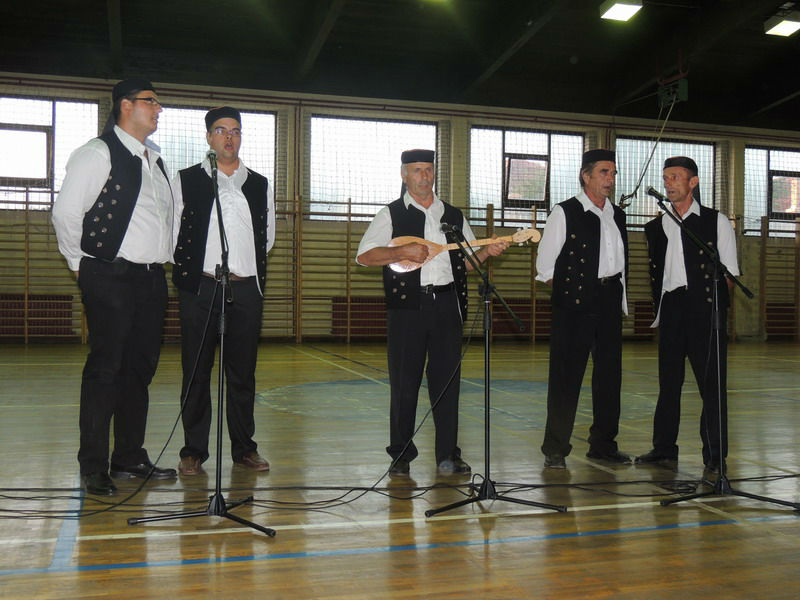
