= Great School Building, Belgrade =

Velika Škola (Great School) Building
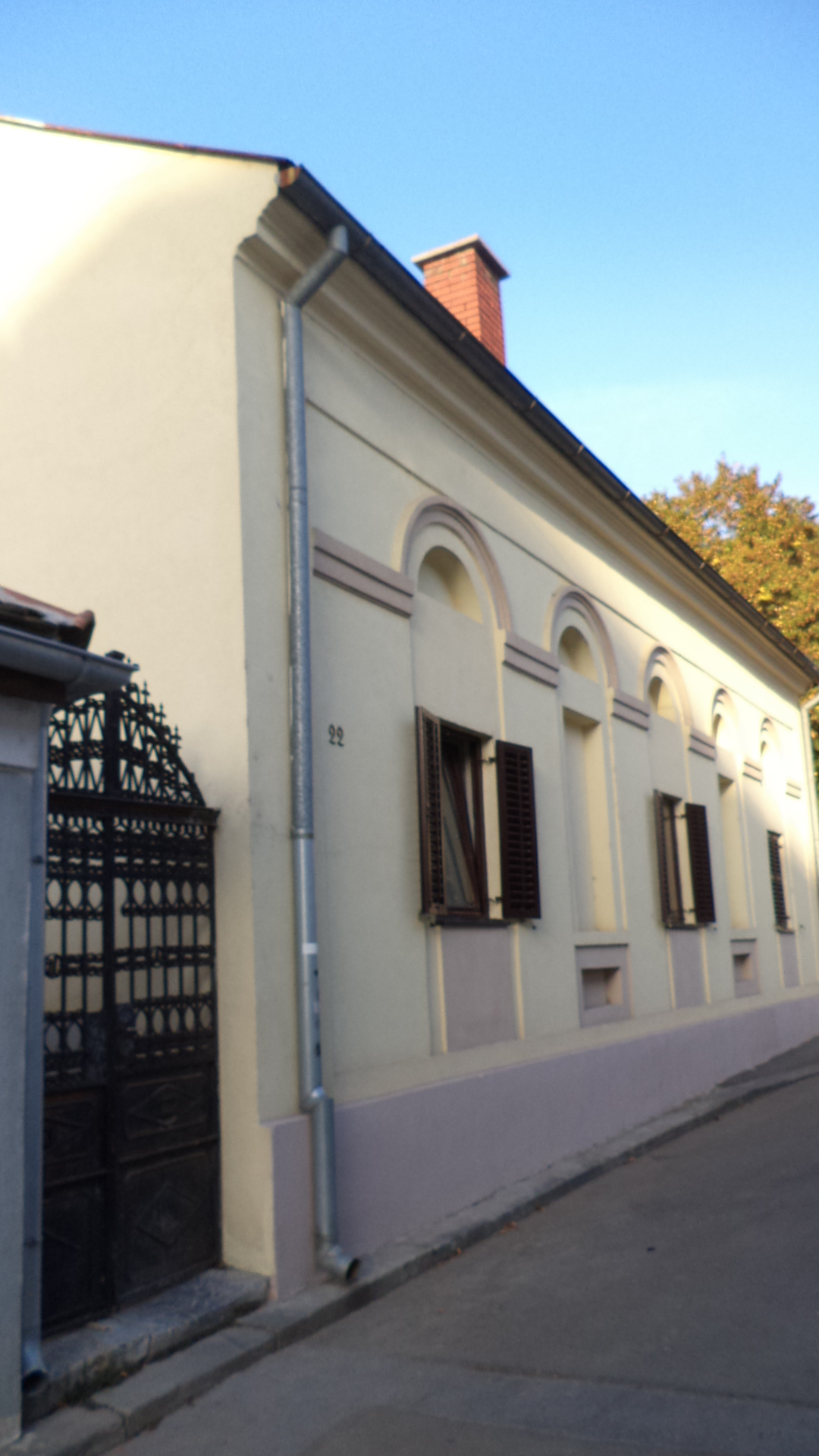
- Velika Škola (Great School) Building

General information
- Status: Cultural Heritage
- Location: Stari grad, Belgrade, Serbia

Website
- beogradskonasledje.rs

Velika Škola Building is a building located in Belgrade, at 22 Gospodar Jevremova Street. It is a building significant both for being the location of the beginning of higher education in Serbia, as well as for the famous historical people who lived in it. It was declared a cultural heritage monument.

== The Architecture ==
Velika Škola Building, named after the Velika škola of Ivan Jugović, consists of two ground- floor buildings. The first, in the courtyard, was erected in the period between 1789 and 1804. The second, turned towards the street, was erected in 1862. The latter additional constructions were merged into the original building to form one single architectural whole. The building in which the school was placed was built as a typical Turkish residential house, probably surrounded by a garden. It was built in timber frame with brick filling. It had a two-gabled roof covered in tiles, at least during the time since it was possible to track it through the visual sources. There was a cellar underneath one part of the building, whereas the other part was joined with the adjacent building whose construction began in 1933 on the same lot and of the same owner. The building where the Velika škola was placed underwent a lot of changes, but still managed to preserve its original characteristics, form and disposition. The first change was done in the period from 1858 to 1864. The most radical change happened in the period from 1960 to 1962. The original entrance was masked with a wall, the roof line was straightened, the levelling of the courtyard was done, and the building was completely "adapted" for modern living.

In the courtyard building on 30 September 1808, Dositej Obradović delivered a ceremonial speech, and with the presence of the chairman and the members of Praviteljstvujušči sovjet, Velika škola, was opened, as the first educational institution of that kind in Serbia. In 1809 Velika škola was transferred to the building of the present Museum of Vuk and Dositej, and the original building was given to Ivan Jugović, the first lecturer and a principal of the Velika škola, whose activity is related to the work of Praviteljstvujušči sovjet and to the work of first high education institution in Belgrade and in Serbia.

== See more ==
- University of Belgrade
- Cultural Heritage of Serbia

== Literature ==
- B.А.Batalaka, The History of the First Serbian Uprising, Belgrade 1989.
- V. Grujić. The Higher Education in Serbia for the first seven decades of the 19th century, XIV, 1967.
