= Atanasije Nikolić =

- Атанасије Николић
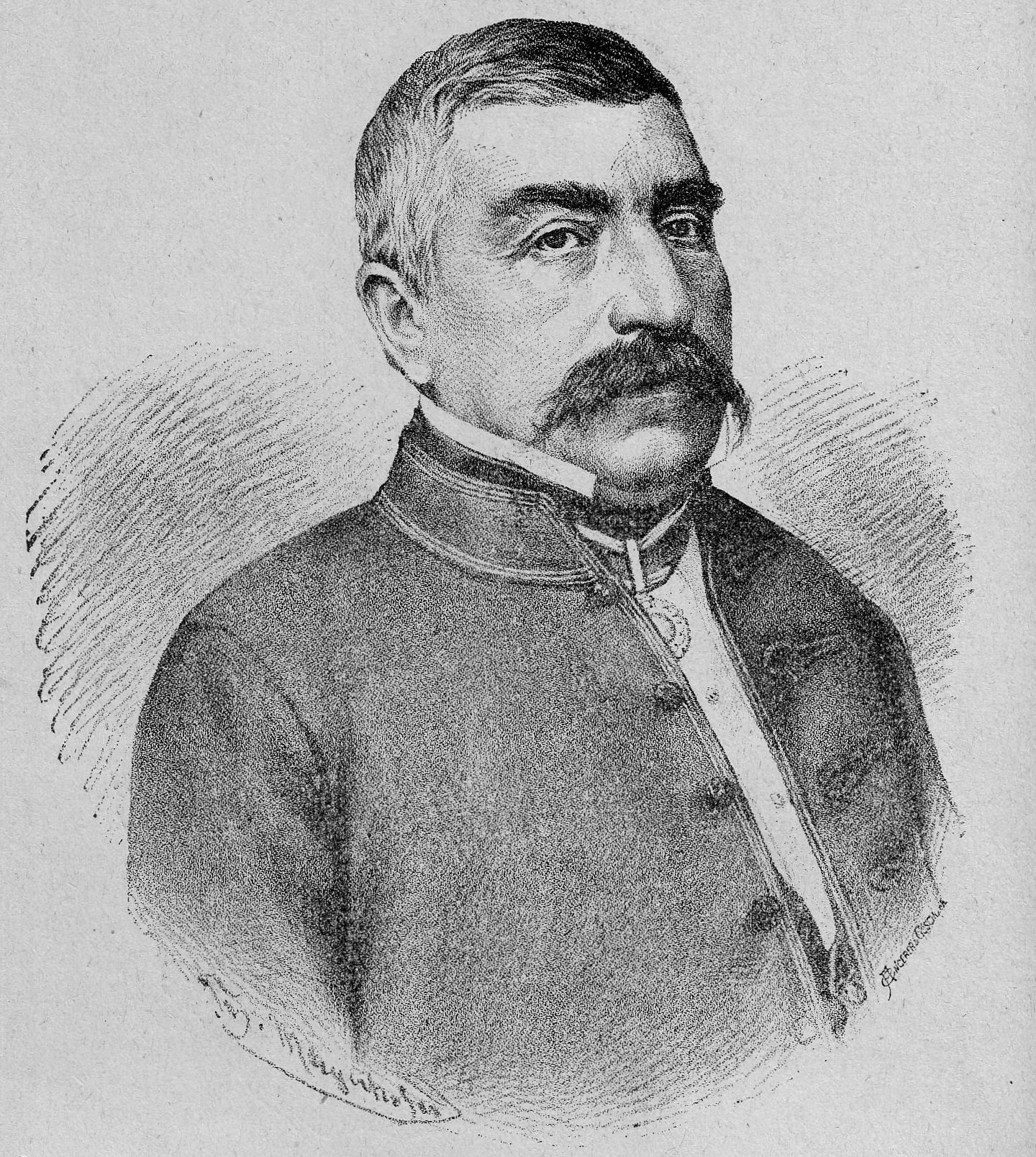
- A portrait of Nikolić

1st Rector of the Lyceum of the Principality of Serbia
- In office 1839–1840
- Succeeded by: Isidor Stojanović

Personal details
- Born: 18 January 1803 Bački Brestovac, Bačka, Austrian Empire
- Died: 28 July 1882 (aged 79) Belgrade, Kingdom of Serbia
- Profession: Rector professor Writer playwright architect

Atanasije Nikolić (Serbian: Атанасије Николић; Bački Brestovac, Bačka, 18 January 1803 — Belgrade, 28 July 1882) was a Serbian teacher and writer, the first mathematics professor and rector at the Lyceum in Kragujevac. He wrote the first undergraduate textbooks in mathematics, algebra, geometry, trigonometry in the Serbian language. He was also employed by the Serbian Ministry of Construction and Public Works as an architect in the then capital city of Kragujevac and later Belgrade.

Today he is remembered as one of the dozen writers who arrived on the scene in the early stages of the nineteenth century along with Jevstatije Mihajlović, Vasilije Čokrljan, playwright Vasilije Jovanović, Miloš Lazarević, Vladislav Jovanović-Čikoš, Josif Vukmirović, Dimitrije Mihailović.

== Biography ==
Atanasije Nikolić was a prolific writer and the most active leader of educational reform in his day. While studying philosophy in Győr, Nikolić showed great affinity to mathematics but did not have the means to continue his further studies. A father of one of his pupils who he tutored privately advised him to enroll at the Great Artillery School in Vienna, where some of the best professors in mathematics in the Habsburg Empire were tenured at the time.

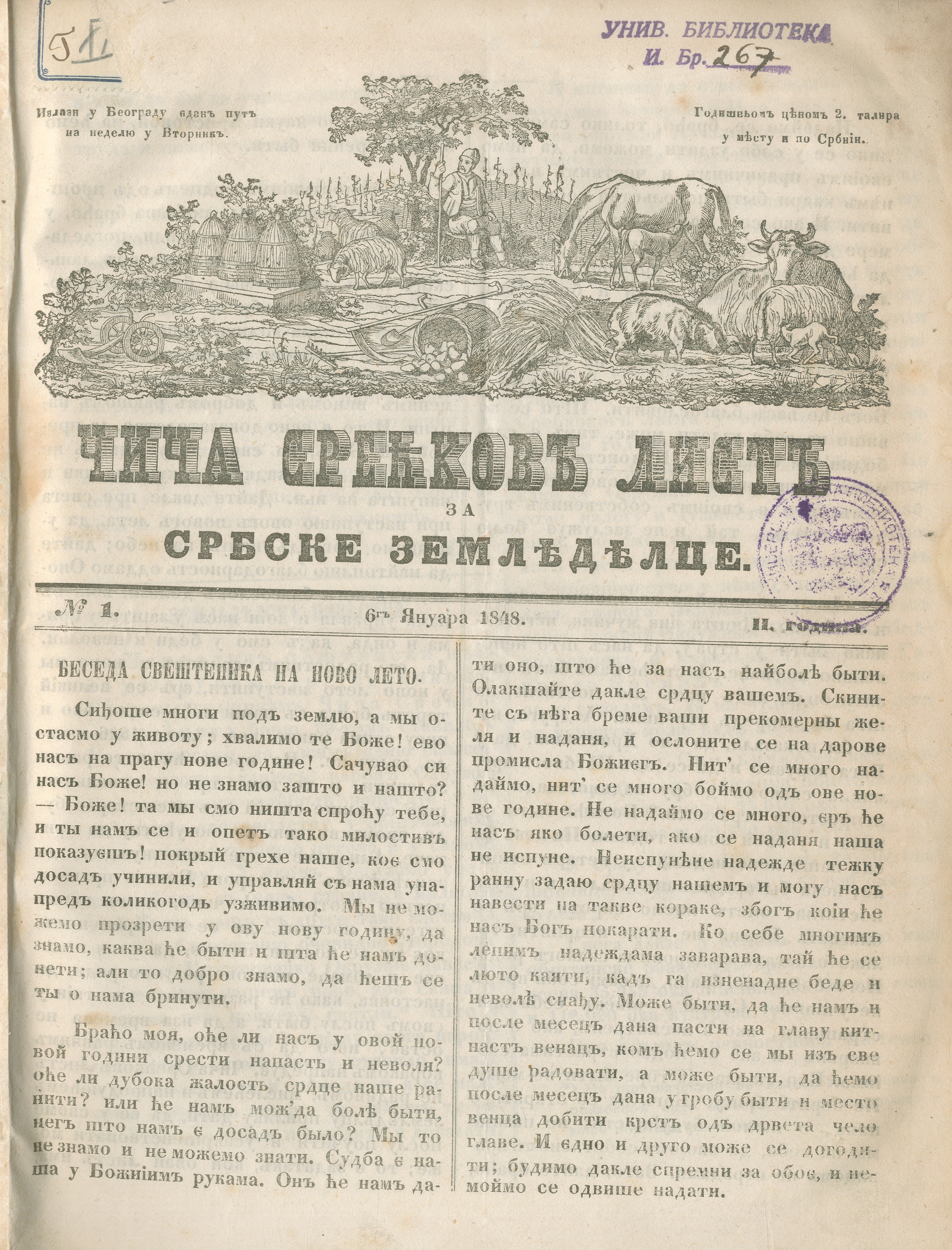
The 1848 cover of the Serbian magazine Čiča Srećkov, edited by Atanasije Nikolić,

This eventually led him to successfully complete the course of studies in mathematics and consequently finish the engineering program at the University of Pest in 1829. Nikolić had undertaken a number of engineering projects in Vojvodina and successfully completed them. In 1838 he was given the first chair of mathematics at the Lyceum. His first task was to write a textbook for the students, which he ardently set about doing, trying to translate mathematical terminology from Latin into vernacular Serbian.

Nikolić’s books became the first textbooks for teaching undergraduate mathematics in Serbia. The first one was Algebra published in 1839, and the second Elementary geometry, published in 1841.

Atanasije Nikolić left a vivid trace in the Principality of Serbia in all areas of life, including in the field of civil engineering and geodesy at the university level back in 1846. He was appointed the first rector of the Lyceum in Kragujevac by the Ministry of Education. He opened an Art School, Mechanical Engineering and Economics Faculty.

A Court Military Band was organized in 1831 in Kragujevac which was then the capital of Serbia. The founder and first bandmaster of the Court Military Band was Josif Schlesinger (1794–1870), a native of the Vojvodina, a part of the Habsburg Empire with a high population of ethnic Serbs. Schlesinger had noticed that Serbian choral societies which had become popular in the Vojvodina had helped to preserve Serbian identity there when it came to be threatened by Magyarization after the fall of the Bach regime in the 1850s. He suggested that the formation of choral societies in Serbia proper should be encouraged too. He himself helped to raise national pride through the music he composed for the Court Band and the Serbian theatres. At the Lyceum, Nikolić wrote melodramas for the stage, some were turned into musicals by Schlesinger. The main people behind the establishment of the Theatre on Đumruk in Belgrade were Jovan Sterija Popović, Josif Schlesinger, Atanasije Nikolić, and others who happily volunteered their time to make the theatrical productions a success.

In 1840, at the suggestion of Atanasije Nikolić, while rector of the Lyceum in Kragujevac, the feast of Saint Sava (Savindan, 27 January [O.S. 14 January]) was chosen to celebrate every year schools and education in general. It was celebrated as a school holiday until 1945 when the communist authorities abolished it. In 1990 it was reintroduce as a school holiday again.

== Selected works ==
- Erecting of Ravanica
- Tsar Dušan's Wedding (1840)
- Kraljević Marko and the Arab (1842)
- Death of Serbian prince Miloš Obrenović (1869)
