= Vionica =

- Village
- Interactive map of Vionica
- Country: Serbia
- District: Moravica District
- Municipality: Ivanjica

Area
  - Total: 22.96 km^{2} (8.86 sq mi)

Population (2011)
  - Total: 204
  - Density: 8.89/km^{2} (23.0/sq mi)
- Time zone: UTC+1 (CET)
  - Summer (DST): UTC+2 (CEST)

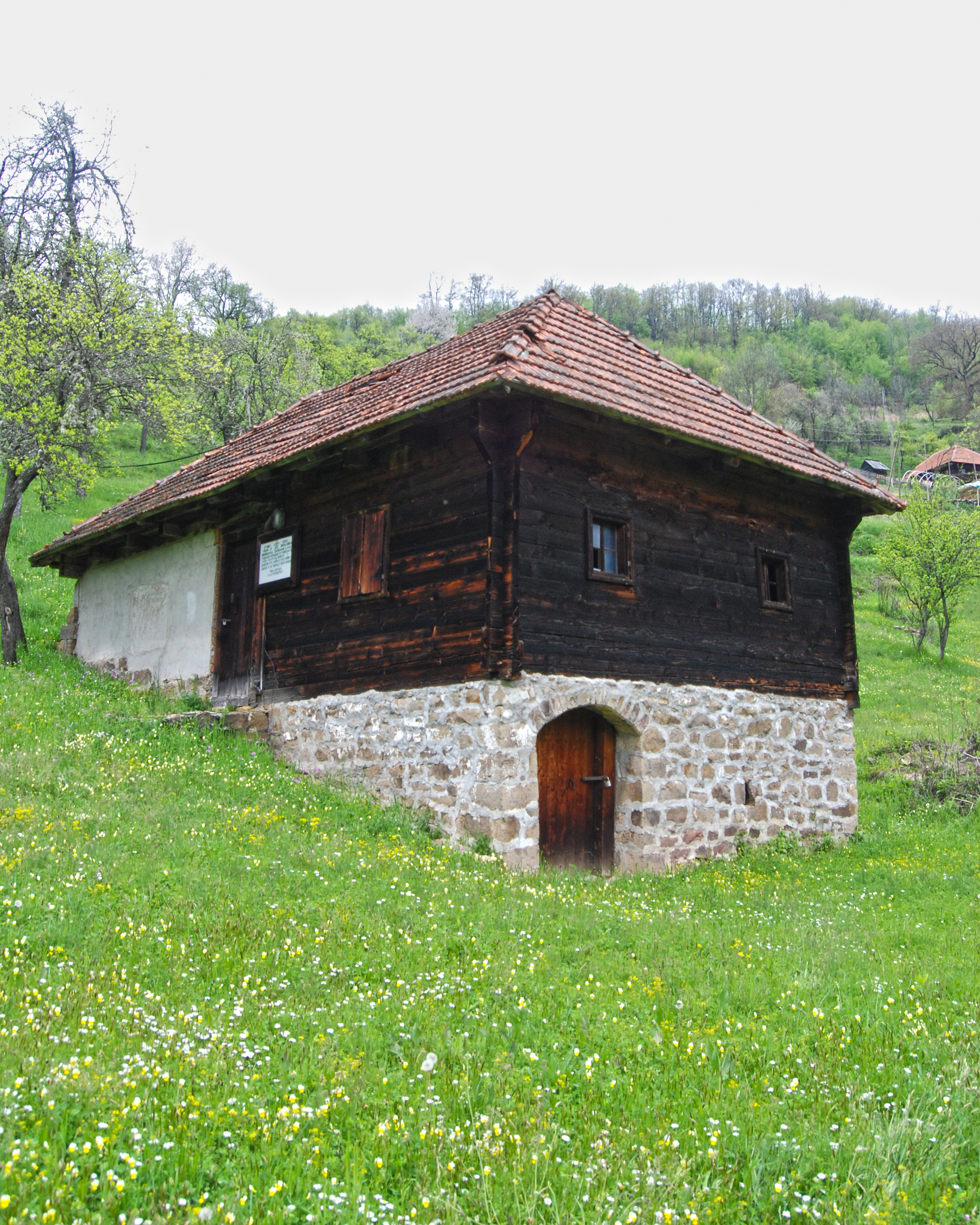
The house of Veniamin Marinković in Devici village, Ivanjica, Serbia

Vionica is a village in the municipality of Ivanjica, Serbia. According to the 2011 census, the village has a population of 204 inhabitants.
