= Jevstatije Mihajlović =

Jevstatije Mihajlovic-Eta (Veliki Beckerek, 1802 - Budapest, 18 October 1888) was a writer, lawyer, senator and judge from the Austrian Empire and later Austria-Hungary.

== Biography ==
He was born in 1802 in Veliki Bečkerek (today Zrenjanin). In his youth, he worked as a teacher for some time. He studied philosophy in Petrovaradin, and law in Sárospatak. After completing his studies, he returned in 1827 back to Veliki Bečkerek, where he lived until 1849 and held important positions in the city government, as well as in Torontál County.

As an educated man and an official of the county and the city, he was registered as a subscriber of several Serbian periodicals many times, and he was also engaged in literary work. According to subscriptions and published works, it is possible to monitor his career progress. He published his first romantic story in 1827 in Buda, as a "lawyer".

The following year in 1828, Mihajlović became a subscriber of a book as a "jurat and writer" in Bečkerek. Then his long public activity began, and as a young man, he became the head of the Bečkerek municipality and between 1829 and 1839 as a city bureau head, but also as a "writer" (and lawyer) of the town of Bečkerek.

As a subscriber to Letopis Matica srpska" in 1833 and a lawyer from Bečkerec, he became a member in 1834 of the "Serbian Literary Society" at Budapest, where he found himself in the good company with like-minded Josif Milovuk, one of the founders Matica srpska, but who eventually withdrew from it for personal reasons. Mihajlović was appointed director of the Latin-Illyrian school in Veliki Bečkerek (1837, 1844), and captain of the town (1840-1841). school (1844).

Before the Civil War in 1848, he was a city senator (1842-1848) and a member of the Torontál County Assembly, which published a book in Novi Sad.

In January 1849, the Serbian army under the command of Stevan Knićanin captured Veliki Bečkerek, where they were solemnly welcomed by a deputation of Bečkerek Serbs. Shortly afterwards, the formation of new authorities began. The administration of the city was taken over by the Serbian People's Committee of Veliki Bečkerek, which was mainly composed of former Serbian members of the city Senate. The committee sought to liaise with the patriarch Josif Rajačić, interim administrator Vojvodovine Srpska, proclaimed at the May Assembly in Sremski Karlovci. Rajačić came to Veliki Beckerek on 19 January 1849, from where he actively led the process of establishing the power of the Serbian People's Movement in the area of the "Torontál County City Border". Mihajlović at the time was a member of the commission for drafting the constitution of Vojvodina. At that time he enjoyed a great reputation of the Assembly and the patriarch.

In April 1849, when the Hungarians captured Veliki Bečkerek, he withdrew to Zemun with the Patriarch Josif Rajačić and all the members of the Main Board of Vojvodina.

As an advisor to the Supreme Court, he was a deputy from Bečkerec at the Serbian Church of the Annunciation's Assembly (Annunciation Church-People's Assembly of Serbs) in Sremski Karlovci held on 1 April 1861, were at that time he had accommodation in the house of Petar Marinković, an old friend.

He was a subscriber to a book in 1862, as an advisor to the Beckerek District Supreme Court. In the middle of 1863, he was elected the royal commissioner of the district, based in Kikinda. Because of that function, he moved to Velika Kikinda.

As a pensioner, he continued to perform the function of court advisor from 1872 to 1882. He lived in Velika Kikinda.

In 1874 he settled in Pest. His daughter Ana married Baron Adolf Staudeh.

He died in 1888 in Budapest.

== Literary work ==
He is a true representative of Serbian romanticism and is considered the founder of Velika Bečkerec literature. He was engaged in literature for almost six decades. Although his literary opus was prolific and diverse, it remained forgotten all this time. Of all the creations, today he is mentioned only as an outraged opponent of Vuk Karadžić and his reforms. His literary works, however, are now being researched and appreciated:

- "The Flower of Innocence or Dobriva and Alexander" (Budim 1827, novel). He dedicated the novel to the merchant Pavle Vlahović from Veliko Bečkere, it was written as a lesson to young people, and it follows the experiences of Dobrivoje Milanić, the son of the Serbian duke Milivoj, who after numerous vicissitudes and adventures is united with his beloved girl Aleksandar.
- "Revenge and Destiny or Dragomir the Prefect of Trebinje" (Budim 1833, novel). And in this novel, the author gave a moral-didactic lesson. The birth takes place in medieval Serbia and Herzegovina. The main character Dragomir Sretić carries out the vow of blood revenge and along the way, he meets the girl Milica. Their love goes through many trials before it triumphs.
- "Jevstatije Mihajlović" is a historical-linguistic study that was written during the banning of the Illyrian movement, in which he gave his view of the movement and for the first time presented his understanding of the Serbian language and literature. He was a supporter of the linguistic unity of Serbs and Croats, and not in the way advocated by Vuk Karadžić, whose reform of language and spelling he criticized in the last chapter. The aim of this work, as stated later in "Defense of the Serbian language" there was a struggle for the Serbian name, against attempts to change it to the Illyrian name, showing that the Illyrians are not the name of any people, but it refers to a certain area in which they live, as the names are used. Montenegrin, Herzegovinian, Dalmatian, Slavonian, Sremac and others, and to all those who speak Serbian and who live from Adriatic a to Timok and the popular name Serb, regardless of the region in which they live and the religion they profess.
- "Common sense or Reflections on the existence of God, the human state, the soul and his immortality" (Novi Sad, 1848, essays). Philosophical-religious essay in which he presented opposing views on the existence of God, the state of the human soul, life after death and related topics, through two main characters and friends, Obrada, a skeptic and a devout enthusiastic believer, who tries to "get his interlocutor on the right path" ”While walking by the river Begej.
- "Defense of the Serbian language from the distortion and forgiveness of it and the Cyrillic alphabet from "Vuk" (Veliki Beckerek, 1863). Without doubting his good intentions, he perfectly formulates, thoroughly and gradually explains the nature of the wrong path taken by the reformers of the Serbian language. He thought that they had changed the language to such an extent that it became incomprehensible. However, according to the letter he used, it can be seen that the author himself partially accepted the principles he criticized, printing his work in a transitional form in Cyrillic. The transition to Vuk's alphabet is especially pronounced in his latest works.
- "Superstitions and unbeliefs with the search and refutation of materialism and atheism or Godlessness" (Novi Sad 1871).
- "The voice of crying common sense against atheism or atheism with evidence that there is a God, there are souls, and there is a future for mankind after this earthly life" (Velika Kikinda 1882).
- "Fates of the Serbian people: with the allegation of the instability of the situation of both individual people and individual peoples in this world, namely the Serbian people" (Velika Kikinda 1883).
