= Pridvorica (Čačak) =

Coordinates: 43°52′22″N 20°17′33″E

- Village
- Interactive map of Pridvorica
- Country: Serbia
- District: Moravica District
- Municipality: Čačak

Area
  - Total: 5.62 km^{2} (2.17 sq mi)
- Elevation: 376 m (1,234 ft)

Population (2011)
  - Total: 195
  - Density: 34.7/km^{2} (89.9/sq mi)
- Time zone: UTC+1 (CET)
  - Summer (DST): UTC+2 (CEST)

Pridvorica (Serbian Cyrillic Придворица) is a village in Serbia situated in the municipality of Čačak and the district of Moravica. In 2002, it had 208 inhabitants, all Serbs.

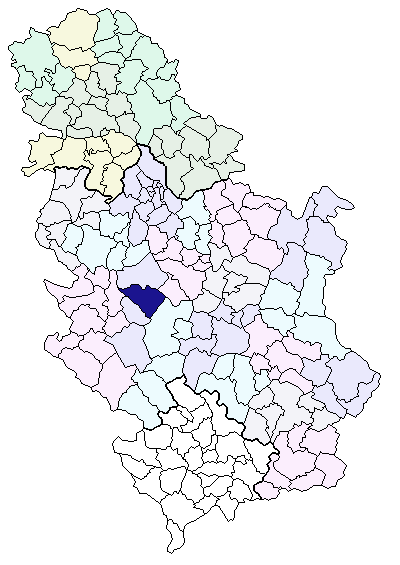
Location of Čačak in Serbia

In 1948, the village had 236 inhabitants, in 1981 140 and, in 1991, 243.
