= Josif Pančić =

Serbian botanist and academic (1814–1888)

- Јосиф Панчић
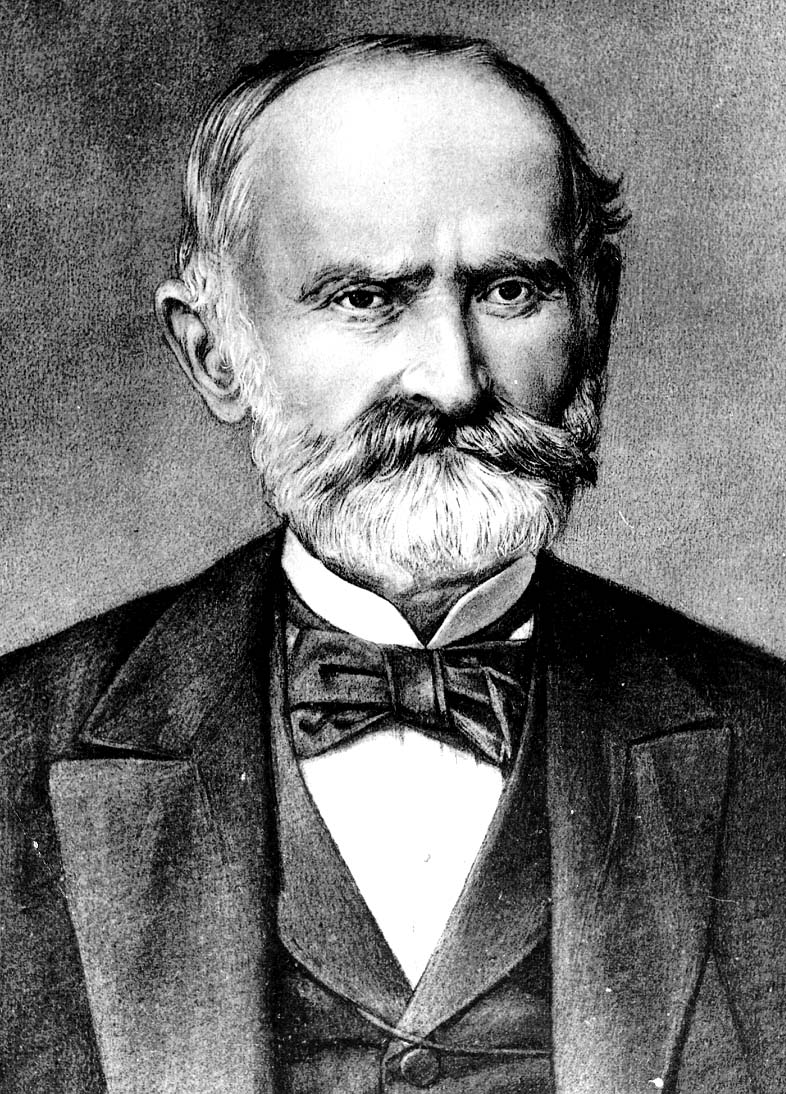
- Josif Pančić
- Born: April 17, 1814; Ugrine, near Bribir, Illyrian Provinces, First French Empire (modern Croatia)
- Died: February 25, 1888 (aged 73); Belgrade, Kingdom of Serbia
- Other name: Josip Pančić
- Citizenship: Principality of Serbia
- Education: University of Pest
- Known for: discovery of Serbian spruce
- Scientific career
- Author abbrev. (botany): Pančić

Josif Pančić (Serbian Cyrillic: Јосиф Панчић; born Josip Pančić; April 17, 1814 – February 25, 1888) was a Serbian botanist, medical doctor, professor and academic. Born in the First French Empire, in present-day Croatia, he earned his medical degree in Hungary before moving to Serbia. He extensively documented the flora of Serbia, and is credited with having classified many species of plants which were unknown to the botanical community at that time. Pančić is credited with discovering the Serbian spruce. He is regarded as the father of Serbian botany.

== Life ==
=== Early life and studies ===
Josif Pančić was born in Ugrine, near Bribir, in the Vinodol region, then part of the Illyrian Provinces of the First French Empire. Pančić was the fourth son of Pavel Pančić and his wife Margarita. His paternal grandfather, who came from the area around Niš, had served in a volunteer battalion of the Austrian Imperial Army during the Austro-Turkish War. According to tradition, the Pančić family hailed from Herzegovina and settled in Ugrini in olden times. Some sources claim that Pančić was of Bunjevci origin, some describe him as of Croat origin, while some sources describe him as of Serb origin.

After finishing elementary school in Gospić, he went on to the lyceum in Rijeka, and then continued classes in the Regia Academica Scientiarum in Zagreb (1830). He graduated in 1842 in Budapest in medicine. In addition to other courses, Pančić attended botany courses, taught by the then renowned botany professor, Joseph Sadler (Sadler József). Later, recalling those early lectures, he wrote:

And since the first course in botany I started to love botany and decided to become a botanist, so I started to botanize excitedly and to collect plants around Pest and Buda,...

=== Work ===
While studying botany at the Natural History Museum in Vienna, Pančić became acquainted with the Serbian linguist Vuk Stefanović Karadžić who wrote him a letter of recommendation to the Serbian authorities, to fulfill his wish to settle in the Principality of Serbia to study Nature. In May 1846, he arrived in Serbia where for the first seven years he worked as a physician in rural area. In 1847, he asked to be released from his Austrian citizenship and applied for Serbian citizenship, the same year he met his future wife Lyudmila Mileva.

In 1853, he moved from Kragujevac to Belgrade when he was first appointed adjunct professor at Belgrade Lyceum's Department of Natural History and Agronomy by decree of Prince Alexander Karadjordjević, before becoming a full-time professor of Natural History and Agriculture in 1854, as decreed by the Ministry of Education of the Principality of Serbia.

Pančić was a lecturer at the Great School (the future University of Belgrade), and the first president of the Serbian Royal Academy. As Professor of Natural Sciences, he was one of the six original professors (along with Konstantin Branković, Jovan Sterija Popović, Đura Daničić, Matija Ban, and Dimitrije Nešić), of the Lyceum of the Principality of Serbia. He later became rector of the Great School (the future University of Belgrade) and the founder of the Institutes of Mineralogy and Geology, Zoological and Botanical Departments and of the experimental botanical gardens in Belgrade.

Pančić extensively documented the flora of Serbia and is credited with having classified many species of plants that were unknown to the botanical community at the time. He discovered a total of 47 valid species new to science. The crowning achievement of Pančić floristic studies was the "Flora of the Principality of Serbia" (Flora Kneževine Srbije) published in 1874, while a supplement was added ten years later. His explorations marked the golden age of Serbia's botany.

His most significant discovery was the Serbian Spruce (Picea omorika), which he discovered near Zaovine on the Tara Mountain in 1875. He firmly established Serbian botany among European sciences. He ascertained that Serbia's flora was rich and worthy of further studies. During the Serbian–Ottoman War (1876–1878), he was the Chief Physician of the Belgrade Hospital.

He is said to have "fallen in love" with Kopaonik, which he visited 16 times between 1851 and 1886.

Pančić was named the first president of the Serbian Royal Academy formed on April 5, 1887. He requested the opening of the Botanical garden "Jevremovac" in Belgrade.

Pančić died on 25 February 1888, his last wish was to be buried in the Kopaonik Mountain.

== Legacy ==
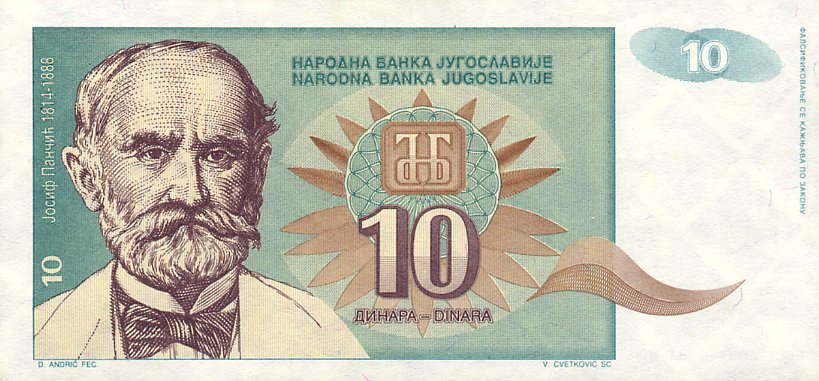
Pančić portrait on a 10 Yugoslav dinars note, 1994

A mausoleum of Josif Pančić was erected at the highest peak of Kopaonik in 1951 by the Academy of Science, the University of Belgrade and the Hiking club, with the inscription:

Honoring Pančić's request, we moved him here to rest forever. Here is his message to the Serbian youth: "Only with a thorough understanding and analysis of the nature of our country will they show how much they love and honor their homeland".

A research society has been named after him, Josif Pančić Biological Research Society (Biološko istraživačko društvo "Josif Pančić"). He was depicted on the 10 Dinars note printed in 1994. He is included in The 100 most prominent Serbs. In 1951, the highest point in the Kopaonik mountain range was changed from Milan Peak to Pančić's Peak.

On April 17, 2010, Google celebrated his birthday with a Google Doodle.

== Awards ==
- Order of St. Sava
- Order of the Cross of Takovo
- Order of the Red Cross

== Selected works ==
- Die Flora der Serpentinberge in Mittel-Serbien (1859)
- Pisces Serbiae (1860)
- Zur Moosflora des nordöstlichen Banates (1861)
- Arena mobilis in Serbia eiusque flora (1863)
- Flora agri Belgradensis methodo analytica digesta – "Flora u okolini Beogradskoj po analitičnom metodu" (1865)
- Šumsko drveće i šiblje u Srbiji (1871)
- Flora Principatus Serbiae – "Flora knez̆evine Srbije ili vaskularne biljke, koje y Srbije divlie rastu" (1874)
- Eine neue conifere in den östlichen Alpen (1876)
- Flora u okolini Beogradskoj po analitičnoj sistemi (1878)
- Elementa ad floram principatus, Bulgariae (1883)
- Nova graca za flora knez︠h︡evine Bugarske (1886)
- Collected works in 11 volumes

== Gallery ==
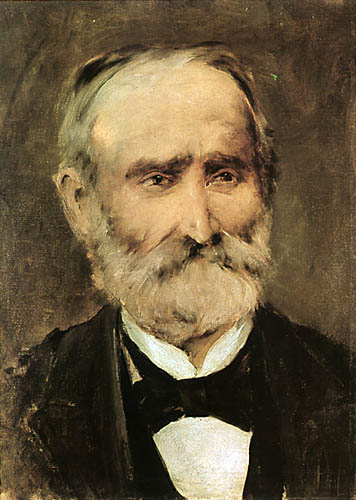
Portrait of Pančić, by Đorđe Krstić, 1871

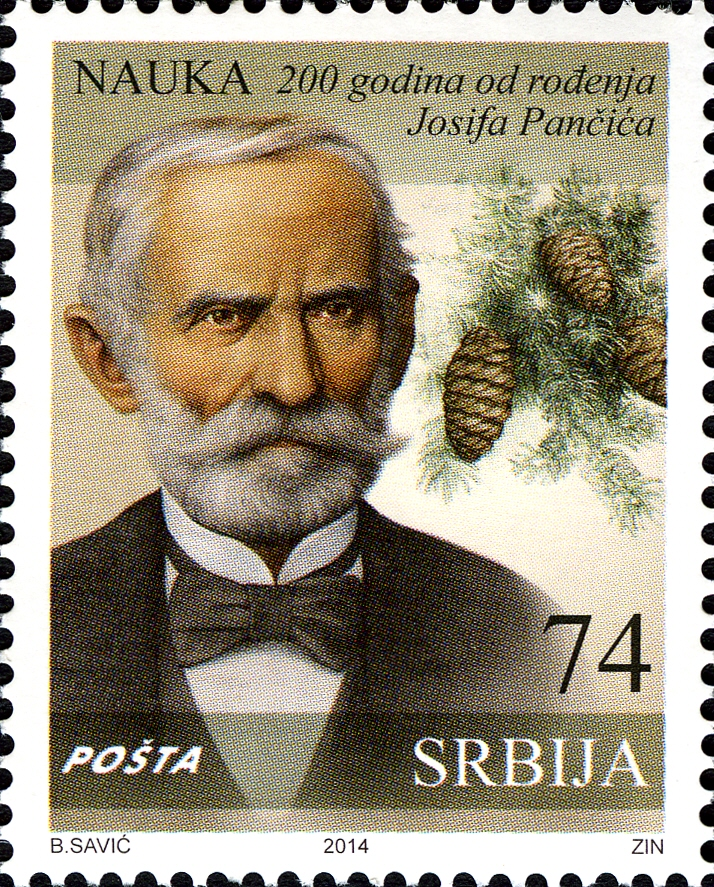
Pančić on a Serbian stamp, 2014

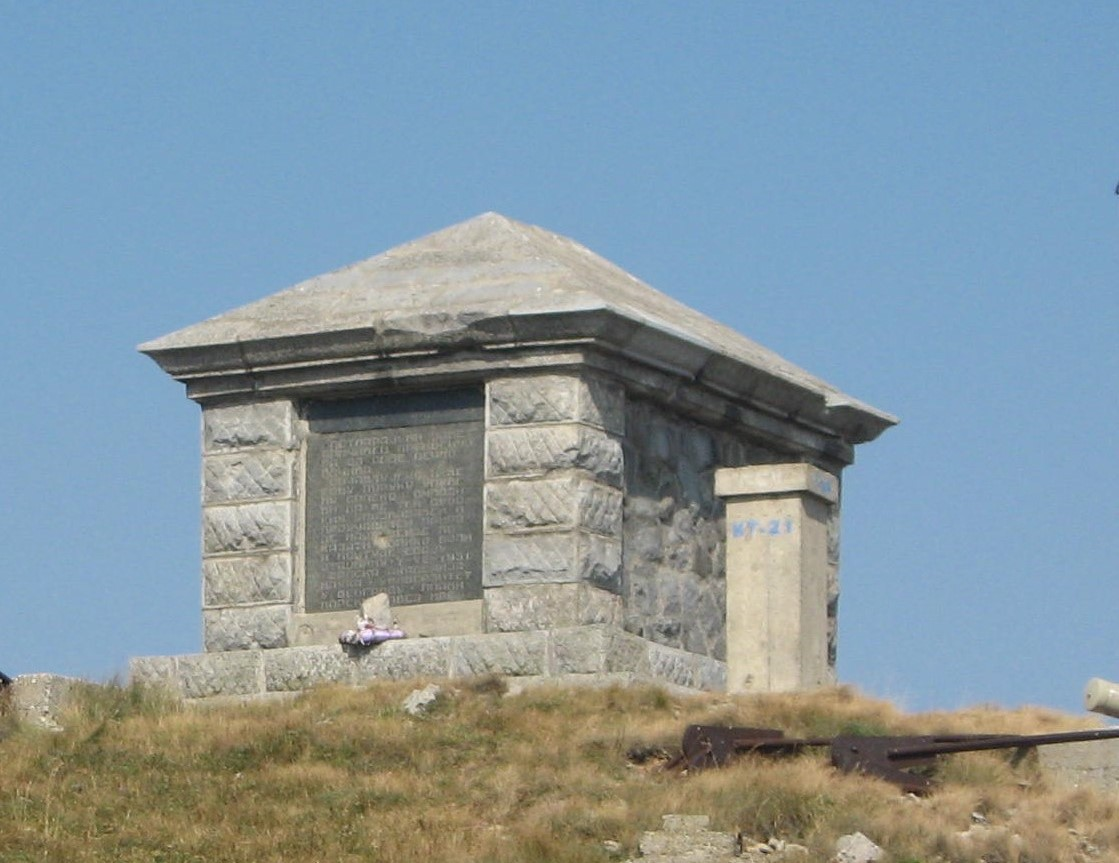
The mausoleum of Josif Pančić on Pančić's Peak

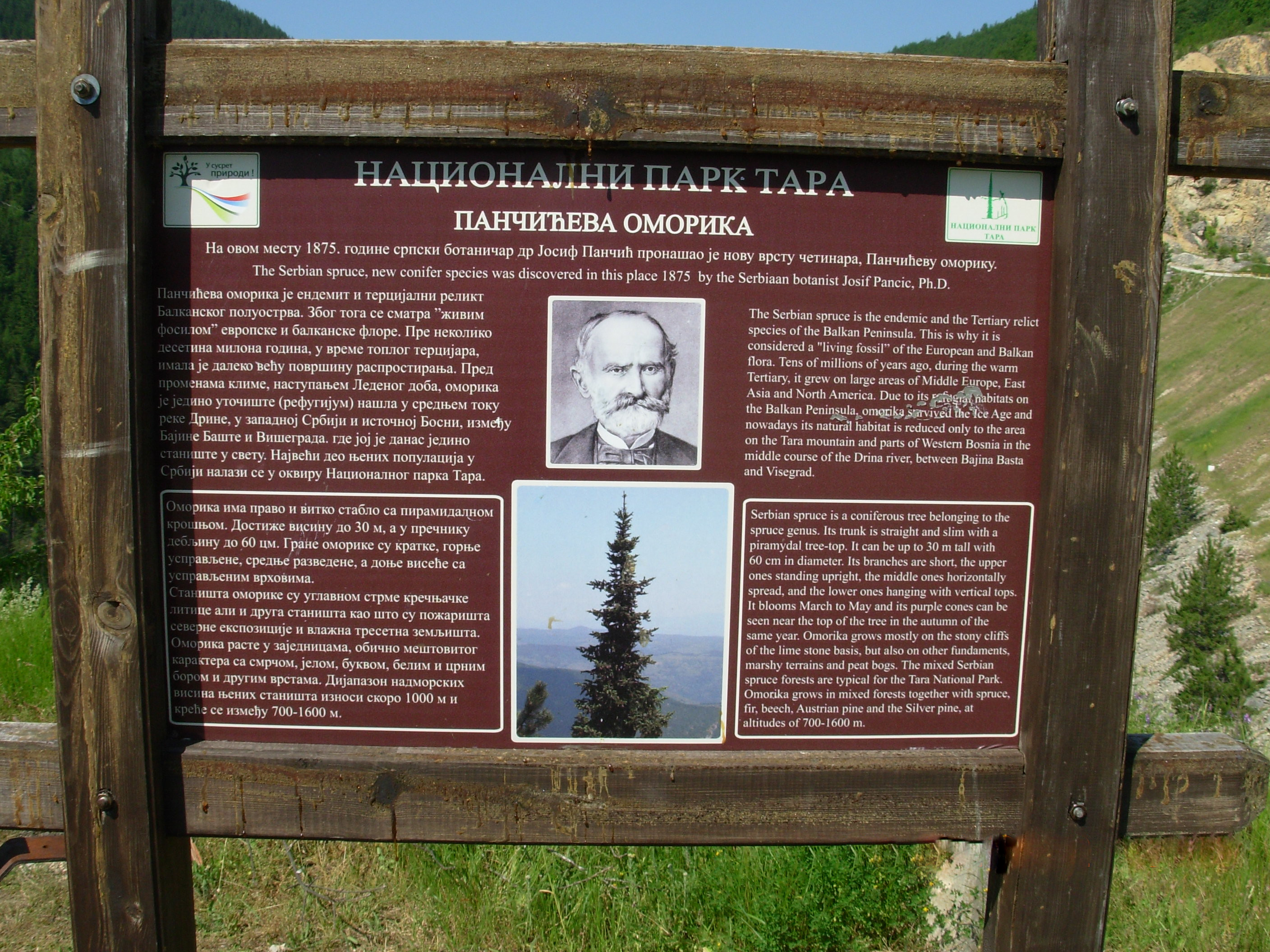
Information board about Pančić and his Serbian spruce at the site where it was discovered on the Tara mountain

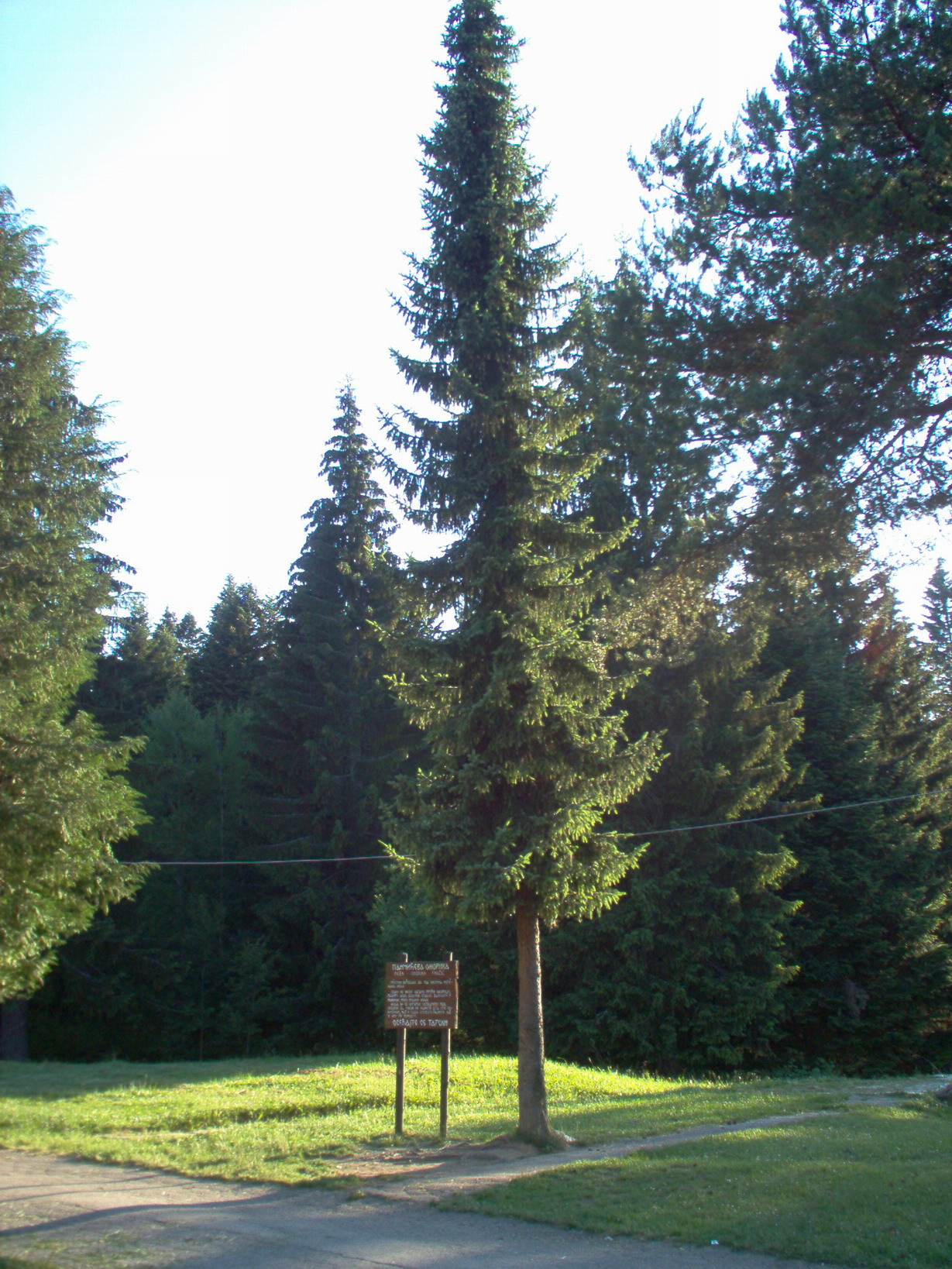
A Serbian Spruce

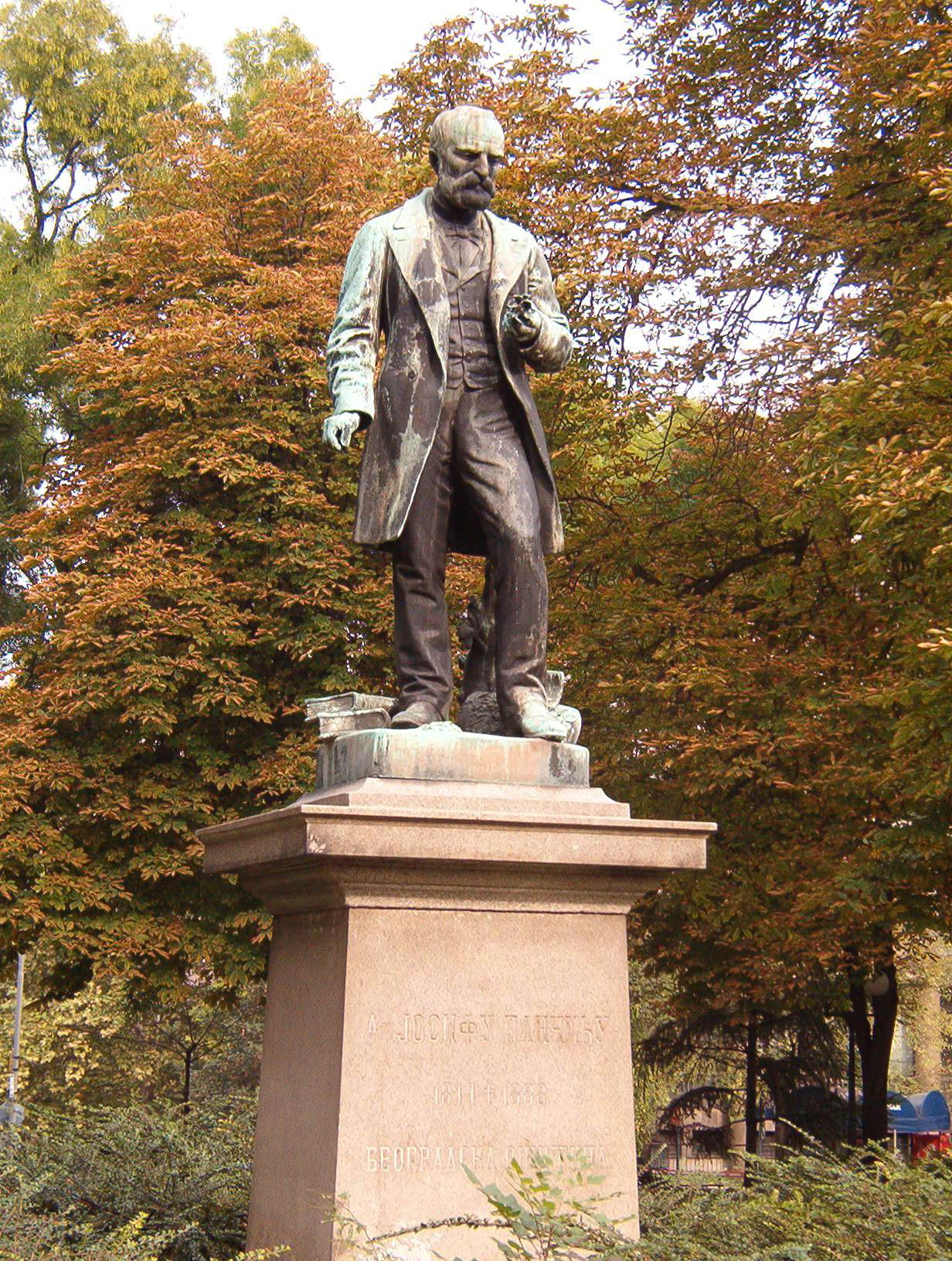
The statue of Josif Pančić in Students Square, Belgrade

== Notes ==
- His name is mostly written as Serbian Josif Pančić (Јосиф Панчић).

== See also ==
- Lujo Adamović
- Nedeljko Košanin
- Sava Petrović

== Sources ==
- Nikola Diklić. "Josif Pančić" (PDF). Lives and Work of the Serbian Scientists. 1: 3–61. Archived from the original (PDF) on 2015-06-21.

Academic offices
| Preceded by Post established | President of Serbian Academy of Sciences and Arts; 1887–1888 | Succeeded by Čedomilj Mijatović |
