= Tulipa serbica =

Scientific classification
- Kingdom: Plantae
- Clade: Tracheophytes
- Clade: Angiosperms
- Clade: Monocots
- Order: Liliales
- Family: Liliaceae
- Subfamily: Lilioideae
- Tribe: Lilieae
- Genus: Tulipa
- Subgenus: Tulipa subg. Tulipa
- Species: T. serbica

Binomial name
- Tulipa serbica Tatić & Krivošej

Species of plant

Tulipa serbica is a species of tulip in the family Liliaceae. It is native to southeastern Serbia and northern Kosovo. It is closely related to Tulipa scardica but displays certain morphological differences in the perianth segments, acute anthers, and staminal filaments.

== Description ==
The plant grows from an oval-shaped bulb covered with brown scales that have pressed hairs on their inner surface. The stem reaches 10–40 cm in height, is smooth, grooved, and produces a single flower. The plant typically has 3–5 pale green leaves, with the lower leaves measuring 10–30 cm long and 1.5–3 cm wide, often with wavy edges. The upper leaves are narrower and more linear in shape.

The flower has a bell-shaped or funnel-bell-shaped form, measuring 2–5 cm in length. Its tepals (petals and sepals that appear similar) are purple or pale wine-purple on both sides, becoming whitish at the margins, and characteristically lack any spots on their inner surface. The outer tepals are pointed, while the inner tepals have small notches near their tips. The flower's stamens are half the length of the tepals, with smooth pale or yellowish filaments and violet anthers that come to a sharp point. After flowering, the plant produces an obovate (egg-shaped with the narrow end at the base) seed capsule that splits open when mature, measuring 2–3 cm long and 1.5–2 cm wide.

Tulipa serbica blooms in April and May at elevations between 500–950 metres above sea level. It was previously confused with Tulipa scardica, but differs by having paler, unspotted flowers, pale (not blackish) staminal filaments, and dull violet (not yellowish) pointed anthers.

== Habitat and distribution ==
Tulipa serbica is endemic to Serbia, with a highly restricted natural range limited to just two known locations in the southern part of the country. The species occurs exclusively on serpentine soils, which are characterized by high levels of metals like nickel, chromium and cobalt, and low levels of essential nutrients such as calcium. This specific soil chemistry creates a challenging environment that has led to specialized adaptation in this tulip species. The plant's confirmed distribution includes two primary sites: Mount Rogozna near Donja Kamenica and Beli Laz hill near the village of Srbovac, about 5 km north of Kosovska Mitrovica. These locations are situated on opposite sides of the Ibar River. Both populations are found at similar elevations, roughly 900 metres above sea level, within a broader elevational range of 500–950 metres.

Unlike its close relative Tulipa scardica, which grows in neighbouring North Macedonia, T. serbica appears to be confined to this small region in Serbia. This highly localized distribution pattern, coupled with its specific soil requirements, makes T. serbica an example of edaphic endemism—a plant that has evolved to grow in a particular soil type within a limited geographic area. The serpentine substrate where this species grows represents a distinctive ecological niche within the broader Balkan flora, hosting several specialized plant communities adapted to these challenging soil conditions.
