= Jovan Sterija Popović =

Serbian playwright and poet (1806–1856)

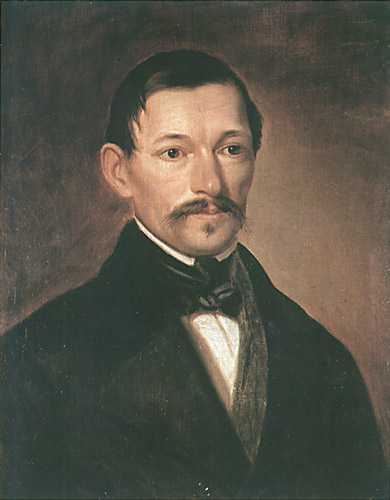
- Born: 13 January 1806; Werschetz, Austrian Empire (modern-day Vršac, Serbia)
- Died: 10 March 1856 (aged 50); Werschetz, Austrian Empire
- Occupations: Playwright, poet, lawyer, pedagogue
- Writing career
- Movements: Classicism, Romanticism, Realism

Signature
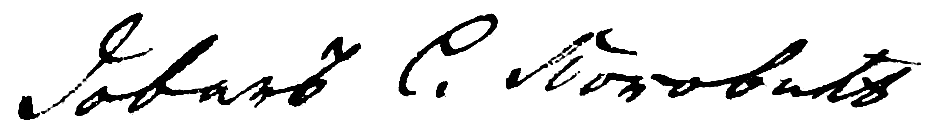

Jovan Sterija Popović (pronounced [jɔ̌v̞an stɛ̂ːrija pɔ̌pɔv̞it͡ɕ]; Serbian Cyrillic: Јован Стерија Поповић; 13 January 1806 – 10 March 1856) was a Serbian language playwright, poet, lawyer, philosopher and pedagogue who taught at the Belgrade Higher School. He was a resident and subject of the Austrian Empire his entire life, although he did spend eight years in the Principality of Serbia. Sterija was recognized by his contemporaries as one of the leading Serbian intellectuals and he is regarded as one of the best comic playwrights in Serbian literature.

== Life ==
Popović was born in Werschetz (Vršac), in Temesch County of the Habsburg Kingdom of Hungary (now Serbia). His father Sterija (meaning 'star'), after whom he was nicknamed, was a merchant. The ethnicity of Popović's father and of Popović himself is disputed, with some saying that they were of Aromanian descent and others saying they were Greek. His maternal grandfather was the painter and poet Nikola Nešković, about whom he wrote a biography.

Popović attended grammar schools in Vršac, Karlowitz (Sremski Karlovci), Temeschwar (Timișoara) and Ofenpesth (Budapest). He studied law at Käsmark (Kežmarok). After he finished his studies (1830), he worked as a professor, and from 1835, when he passed his bar examination, he returned to his hometown where he first taught Latin, then opened his law practice. Like many other intellectuals of Vojvodina, driven by patriotic feelings, he decided to work in the Principality of Serbia. He began to write historical dramas but soon switched to comedy. In 1840 he went to Kragujevac to study at the pedagogic school of natural law. In the same year, he moved to Belgrade, where he would spend eight years, teaching at what was then the most advanced school in Serbia, the Velika škola.

He was instrumental in founding the Serbian Academy of Sciences and the National Museum. He continued to write dramas, which he also organized, staged, and directed. He was appointed head of the Ministry of Education by the constitutional government in 1842. He remained in this position until 1848, working on organizing the school system and education in Serbia. His continued disagreement with the leading politicians of the day and ill health would soon force him to withdraw from public life. At the beginning of the same year (1848) he decided to tender his resignation and return to Vršac (1848-9 part of Serbian Vojvodina, 1849–60 Serbia and Temeschwar), where he lived till his death in 1856, deeply disappointed with people and life in general. He is buried at the Orthodox cemetery in Vršac.

== Drama ==
Jovan Sterija Popović is undoubtedly one of the most significant figures of Serbian literature. With good reason he has been given the name "the father of Serbian drama". Following the example of the great French and German tragedians, he described events from the history of the Serbian people. The Belgrade theatre Theater on Đumruk opened with his tragedy Smrt Stefana Dečanskog in 1841. The first Sterija's tragedy Svetislav i Mileva is worth mentioning, then Miloš Obilić ili Padnuće serbskog carstva, Nesrećno supružestvo ili Naod Simeon, Skenderbeg and Lahan. Miošić's poems about Skanderbeg from his most important work A Pleasant Discourse of the Slavic People were basis for Život i viteška voevanja slavnog kneza epirskog Đorđa Kastriota Skenderbega written by Sterija Popović in 1828.

Sterija showed a real artistic value as the writer of comedies. His comedian talent has created strong and great literary works, which are even greater because it was, in fact, Sterija who paved the way to the Serbian comedy in general. The first period of Sterija's writing of comedies falls on the time of his life in Vršac, between 1830 and 1840. Sterija eternalized his home-town with the characters of Kir Janja, Fema Ružić and others. His comedies Laža i Paralaža (1830), Pokondirena tikva (1830), Tvrdica (1837) and Zla žena (1838), have brought him the appreciation of his contemporaries and the reputation of being "Serbian Molière". In 1841, 1842 and 1847 some less important Sterija's comedies were also performed: Ženidba i udadba, Simpatije i antipatije, Volšebni magarac, Džandrljiv muž, Sudbina jednog razuma, and Prevara za prevaru. His comedy Beograd nekad i sad which describes the environment of 19th century Belgrade was published in 1853. The last comedy Sterija wrote was the satire Rodoljupci. He did not print this important comedy at all, so it remained in manuscript long after his death. Sterija found the inspiration for this comedy in the revolutionary events of 1848–1849.

== Poetry ==
A dominant theme in Sterija's poetry is his criticism of the discrepancy between what was being proclaimed and people's actual behavior. In his poem Godine 1848 (Year 1848) the focus is the betrayal of the ideals of the American Revolution—legal slavery in the supposed land of the free; in Izobraženiku (To an Enlightened One), the hypocrisy of those who condemn the Ottoman Empire as barbaric, while themselves engaging in conquest and the slave trade.

== Legacy ==
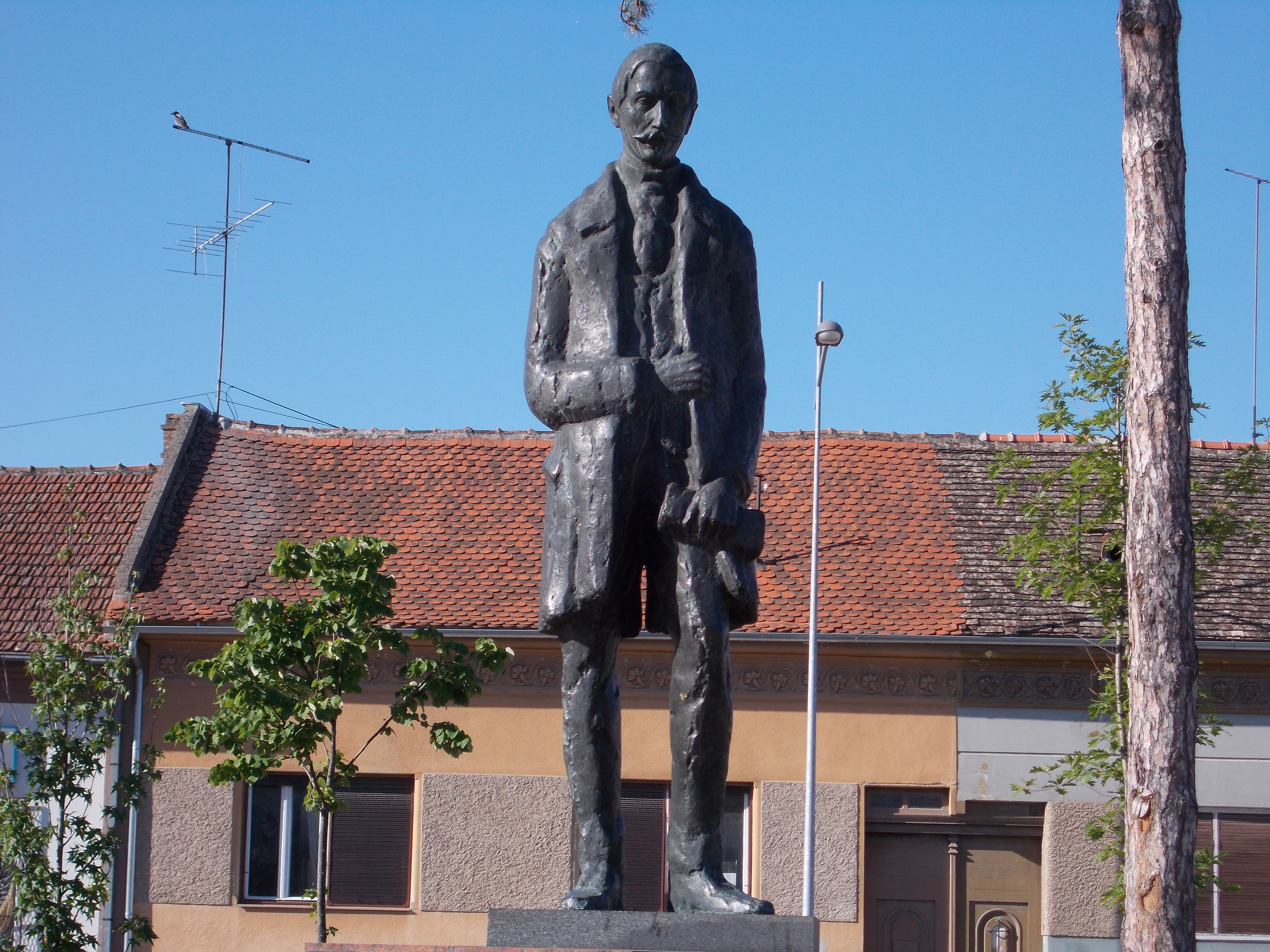
Jovan Sterija Popović monument in the Russian park in Vršac

Sterija was recognized by his contemporaries as one of the leading Serbian intellectuals. He is regarded as one of the best comic playwrights in Serbian literature.

Sterija's comedies are artistically authentic pictures of one part of the Serbian society in Vojvodina, in the first half of the 19th century. They bring a rich gallery of characters. Sterija's comedies have passed the framework of their time and have become a part of the Serbian cultural inheritance. Diverse as a writer, Sterija also wrote satires, novels, dissertations about literature and language and reflexive poetry, published in the book Davorje which is considered to be one of the best books of reflexive poetry in the Serbian literature. Living in Serbia as Minister of Education, Sterija was the founder of The Society of Serbian Letters (now Serbian Academy of Science and Art) and the National Museum of Serbia. He laid the foundation of the modern Serbian school system and he was the author of many textbooks.

A documentary about his life was produced in Yugoslavia in 1956.

He is included in The 100 most prominent Serbs.

== Selected works ==
- Slezi Bolgariji, epic poem, 1825
- Boj na Kosovu (Milan Toplica i Zoraida), historical novel, 1828
- Svetislav i Mileva (Nevinost), historical drama, 1827
- Miloš Obilić, historical drama, 1828
- Život i viteška vojevanja slavnoga kneza epirskoga Đurđa Kastriota Skenderbega, 1828
- Nahod Simeun, historical drama, 1830
- Dejan i Damjanka (Padenije Bosanskog kreljevstva), historical novel, 1830
- Laža i paralaža, comedy, 1830
- Tvrdica (Kir Janja), comedy, 1837
- Pokondirena tikva, comedy, 1838
- Zla žena, comedy, 1838
- Roman bez romana, novel, 1832–1838
- Vladislav, tragedy, 1843
- San Marka Kraljevića, tragedy, 1848
- Smrt Stefana Dečanskog, tragedy, 1849
- Rodoljupci, comedy, 1849–1853
- Ajduci, tragedy, 1853
- Lahan, tragedy, 1853
- Ženidba i udadba, comedy, 1853
- Beograd nekad i sad, comedy, 1853
- Davorje, book of poems, 1854

== See also ==
- Joakim Vujić
- Branislav Nušić

== Sources ==
- Hochman, Stanley (1984). McGraw-Hill Encyclopedia of World Drama: An International Reference Work in 5 Volumes. VNR AG. ISBN 978-0-07-079169-5.
- Mikasinovich, Branko; Milivojević, Dragan; Mihailovich, Vasa D. (1973). Introduction to Yugoslav literature: an anthology of fiction and poetry. Twayne Publishers.
- Mihailovich, Vasa; Mikasinovich, Branko (2007). An Anthology of Serbian Literature. Slavica. ISBN 978-0-89357-320-1.
- Miljković, Branislav (1956). Knjiga o Steriji. Štamp. "Kultura".
- Norris, David (2008). Belgrade: A Cultural History. Oxford University Press. ISBN 978-0-19-537609-8.
- Sorescu-Marinković, Annemarie; Dragnea, Mihai; Kahl, Thede; Nyagulov, Blagovest; Dyer, Donald Leroy; Costanzo, Angelo, eds. (2021). The Romance-Speaking Balkans: Language and the Politics of Identity. BRILL. ISBN 978-90-04-45617-4.
- Pavlović, Trifun (1999). "KOJI OD ZVEZDA VODI POREKLO". Srpsko Nasleđe (13).
- Отац српске драме и позоришта [Father of Serbian drama and theater]. Politikin Zabavnik (in Serbian) (3296): 25. 10 April 2014. ISSN 0032-339X.
