= Precursors to the University of Belgrade =

Lyceum of the Principality of Serbia
- Лицеј Кнежевине Србије
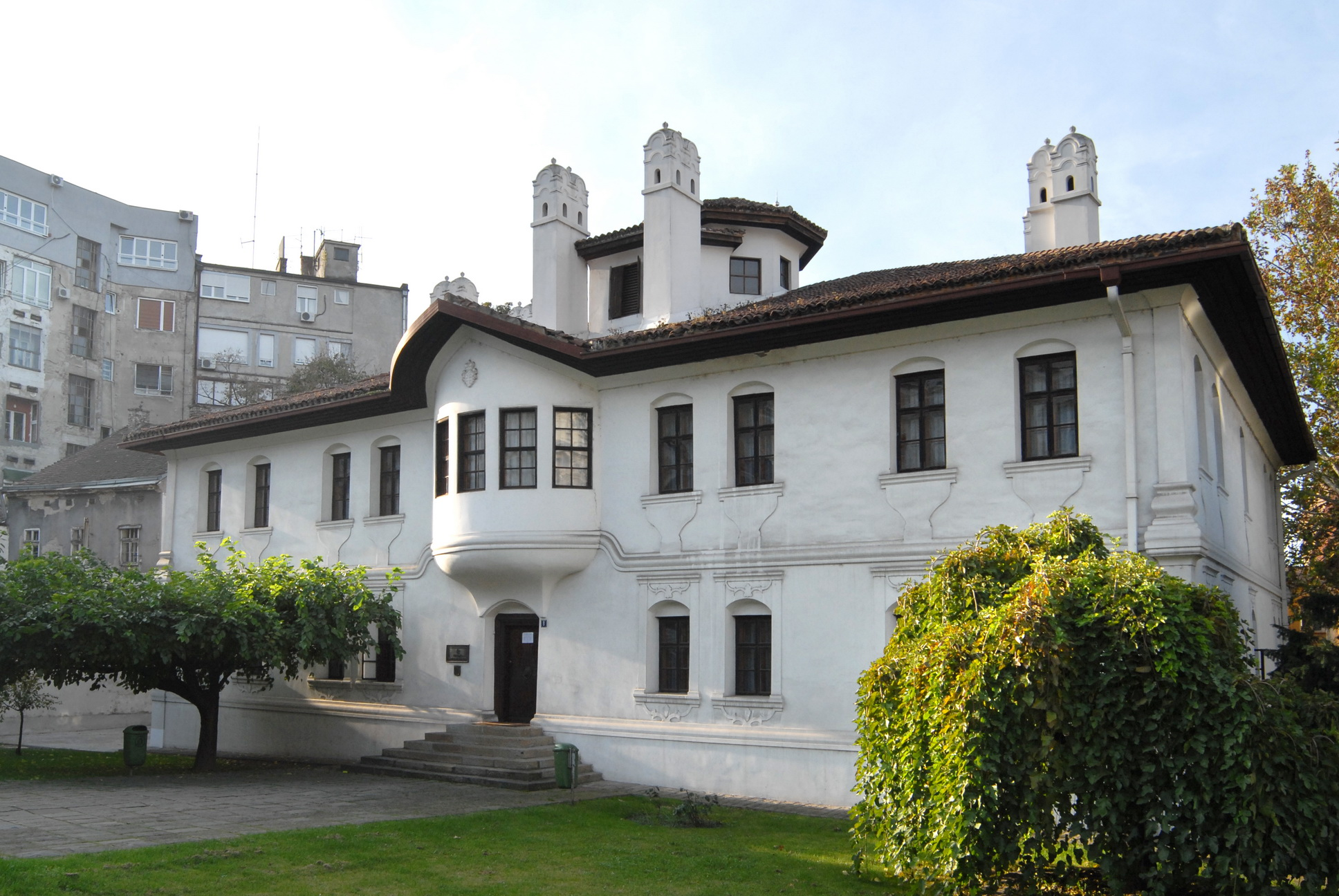
- Princess Ljubica's Residence where the Lyceum was located for a few years
- Founder: Prince Miloš Obrenović
- Rector: Atanasije Nikolić (until 1840)
- Location: Kragujevac (1838-1841); Belgrade (1841-1863), Principality of Serbia
- Language: Serbian

The University of Belgrade traces its roots to three consecutive schools founded in the 19th century. The Higher School (Serbian: Velika škola) was the earliest school, but soon replaced by the Lyceum of the Principality of Serbia, the first higher education school in Serbia in which education was taught in Serbian. After another reform, the Higher School was reintroduced, and existed until the turn of the 20th century, when the University was formally founded.

== History ==
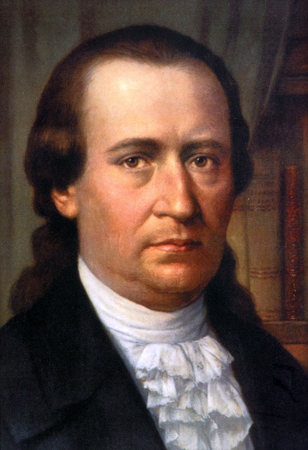
Dositej Obradović, founder of the university

The Higher School or Great School (Serbian: Београдска Велика школа, Beogradska Velika škola) was modeled after Grandes écoles. It was established by Dositej Obradović, a key Serbian figure in the Age of Enlightenment.

The Velika škola of Ivan Jugović was initially located in the Great School Building.

The Lyceum was initially located at the Princess Ljubica's Residence building and then moved to another significant site in Belgrade, the Captain Miša’s Mansion, which today serves as the university's seat.

The Lyceum of the Principality of Serbia (Serbian: Лицеј Кнежевине Србије) was founded in 1838 on the initiative of Prince Miloš Obrenović in Kragujevac, then the capital of Serbia. When Belgrade became the Serbian capital city in 1841, the Serbian Lyceum was also transferred. In 1863 it was transformed into a Great School with three faculties.

The second Higher School (also known as the Great School or Great Academy of Belgrade) was established as the successor of the Lyceum and merged into the University of Belgrade. Under the law, it was defined as a "scientific institute for higher and professional education." The education minister had control over this institution, while it was jointly managed by the rector (elected by the monarch) and the Academic Council.

In the early 19th century, the studies of law lasted three years and the curriculum included comparative and state (constitutional) law, international law, criminal law, and judicial procedure, as well as general subjects. This is how the modern legal education in Serbia emerged in the year 1808. Before enrolling in the legal department, it was compulsory to graduate from the philosophy department, where the studies lasted two years, so the legal studies lasted a total of five years.

The lectures were held by professors who had earned their diplomas in Austria, Germany and France (Jovan Sterija Popović, Josif Pančić, Đura Daničić, and others).

During its early history, it had three departments: Philosophy, Engineering, and Law.

Initially, the Lyceum had only philosophy and law departments. In 1845 the Lyceum received the first instruments from future physics professor and rector of the Lycée Vuk Marinković. A natural science and engineering department was added to the philosophy and law department, in 1853 and included a Chemistry department which is considered as nucleus of the Faculty of Chemistry at Belgrade University. The laboratory of the chemistry department was in the basement of the Princess Ljubica's Residence.

Since 1853, legal education has become independent from the studies of philosophy, and since 1863, legal education in Serbia has lasted four years.

During the 1850s, the Philosophy (General) Department developed into a particular college. The University of Belgrade's Faculty of Philosophy is today's continuation of this department.

The first academic lecture on electrical engineering in Serbia was held in 1894. Professor Stevan Marković was the first lecturer and founder of the Engineering Department at the Higher School. Only four years later, Professor Marković also established the first Serbian electrical engineering laboratory. Since then, this academic discipline has been studied at the Higher School and the University of Belgrade. The first diplomas in this field were given in 1922.

In 1905 the Great School was reformed as the University of Belgrade with four faculties: Philosophy, Law, Technical and Medical.

The Higher School formally became the University of Belgrade through the Law on the University from February 27, 1905. This law introduced faculties of social science and humanities (including a Faculty of Orthodox Theology and Law), medical sciences, sciences and mathematics, along with technology and engineering.

== Students ==
There were 21 students in the first generation and 17 of them finished the studies. In the first period, there were only between 20 and 30 students in each generation. After graduation, some of them received the government's scholarship to continue their education abroad.

The Lycée was intended to provide the kind of pragmatic education needed for civil servants in the growing administration: in 1815 there were just 24 government officials, but this number grew to 672 by 1839.

The first student organization in Serbia, Association of Serbian Youth, was established in this lyceum in 1847, but it was soon banned because of their criticism of the Defenders of the Constitution.

== Professors ==
The first six professors of the Lyceum were Jovan Sterija Popović, Đura Daničić, Josif Pančić, Matija Ban, Dimitrije Nešić and Konstantin Branković. Shortly later, came Marko Marinković, Sergije Nikolić, Isidor Stojanović, Janko Šafarić, Miloš Popović, etc.

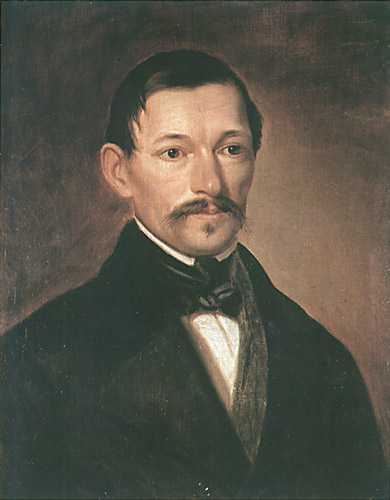
Jovan Sterija Popović

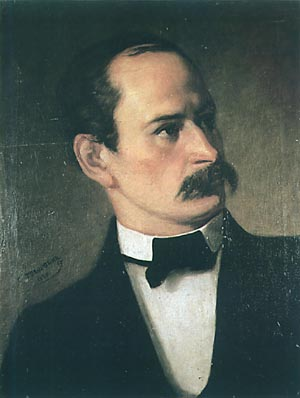
Đura Daničić

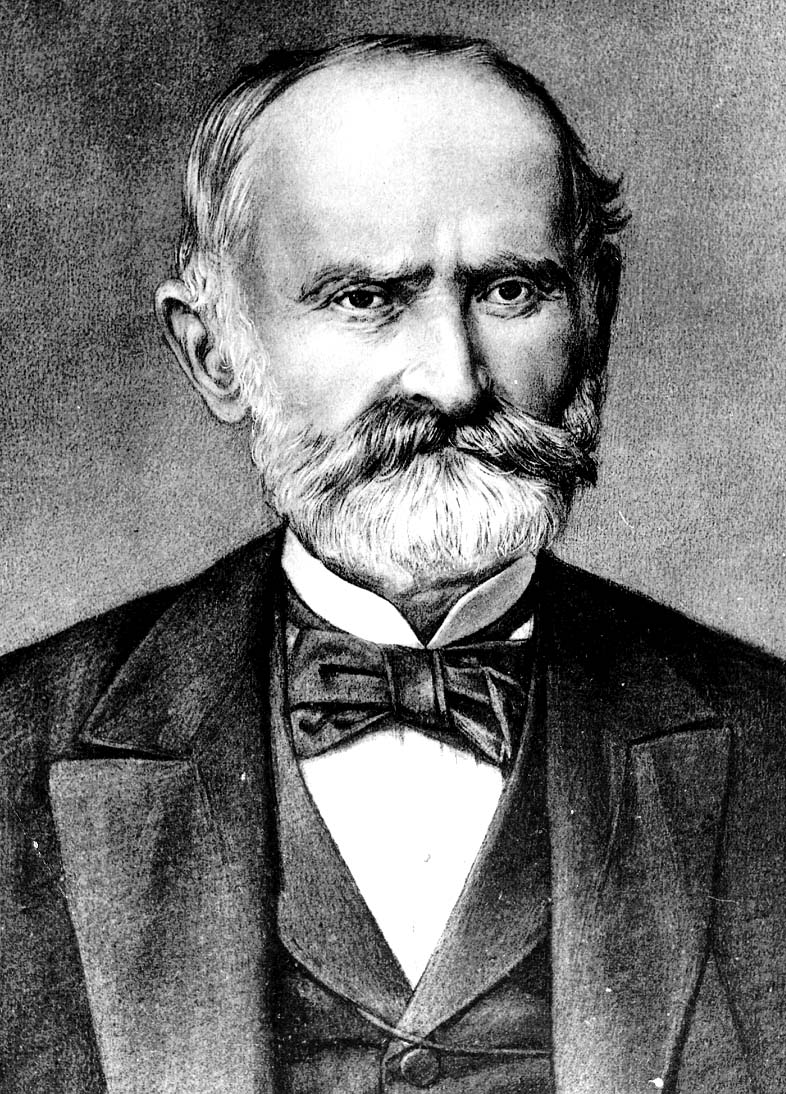
Josif Pančić

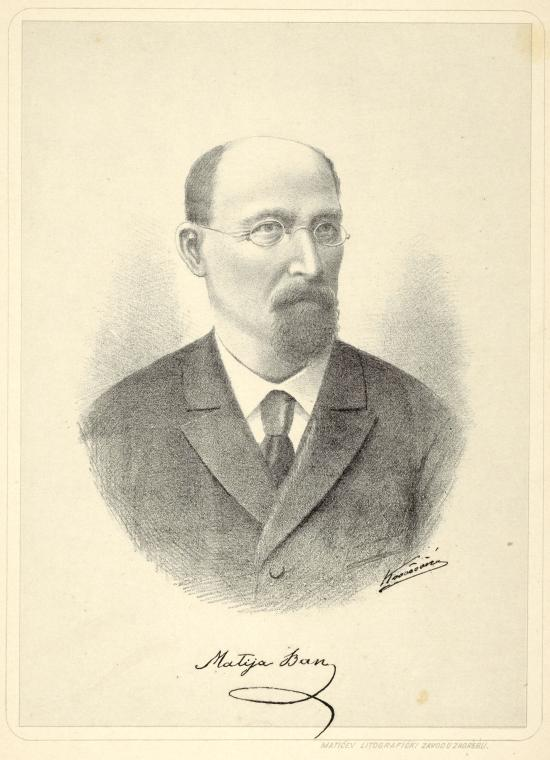
Matija Ban

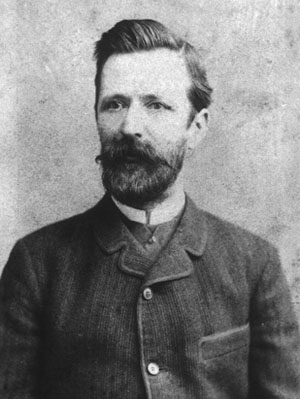
Dimitrije Nešić

== See also ==
- History of the University of Belgrade
