= Botanical Garden Kragujevac =

Botanical garden in Serbia

- Ботаничка башта Крагујевац (Serbian)
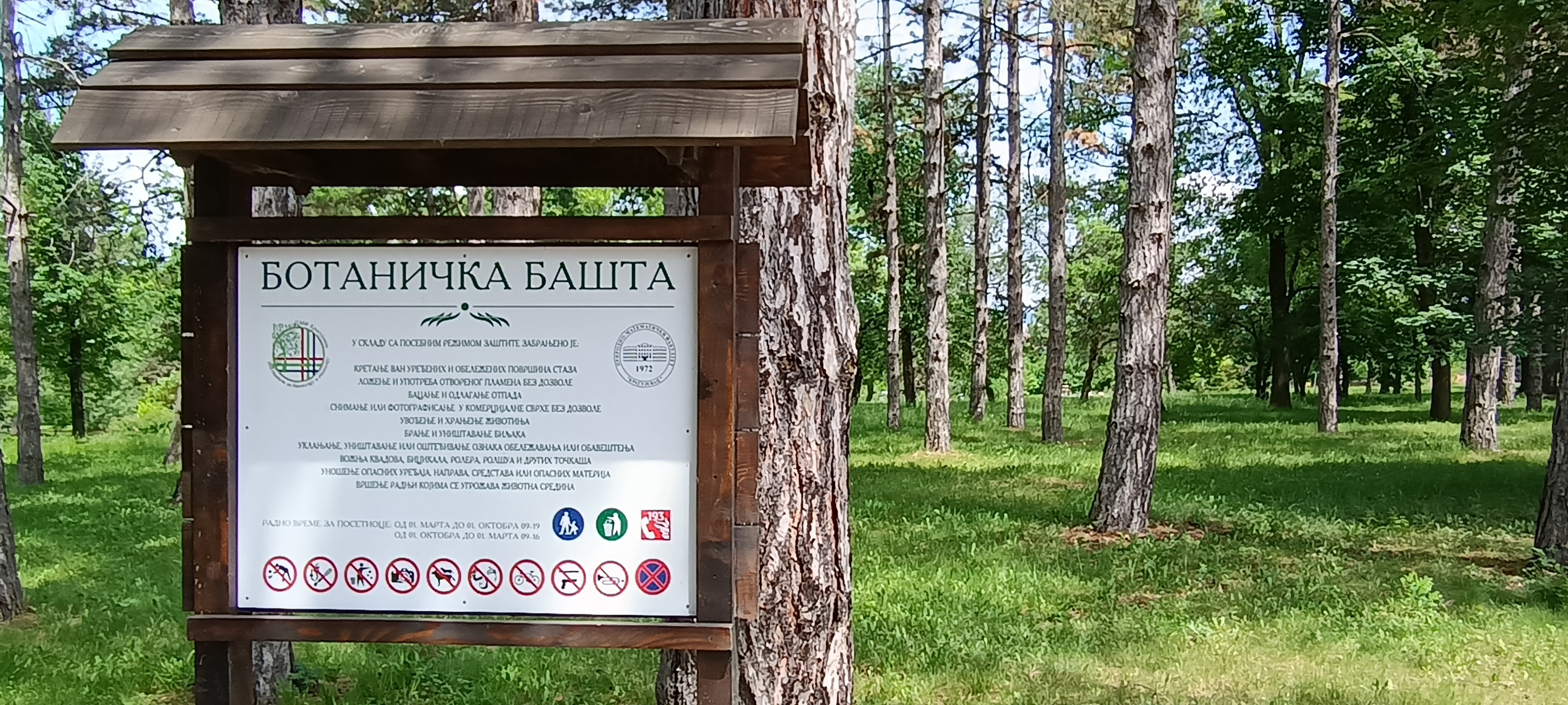
- Interactive map of Botanical Garden Kragujevac
- Type: Public park
- Location: Šumarice Memorial Park, Kragujevac, Serbia
- Coordinates: 44°01′25″N 20°53′12″E
- Created: 1997
- Website: pmf.kg.ac.rs/botanicka_basta/index.html

Botanical Garden Kragujevac (Serbian: Ботаничка башта Крагујевац, Botanička bašta Kragujevac) is an organizational unit of the Institute for Biology and Ecology (Note: Department of Biology and Ecology is the organizational unit of Faculty of Science – University of Kragujevac for education of biological and ecological personnel profiles, teachers for primary and secondary schools, as well as researchers who will apply their knowledge in pedagogical, scientific and economic activities. The activities related to education and scientific research are partly performed in separate organizational units such as an aquarium, Botanical garden and Centre for Preclinical Testing of Active Substances – CPCTAS.) at the Faculty of Science in Kragujevac (Serbia). It is located in the complex of Šumarice Memorial Park, on an area of 18.6 hectares. Garden planning began in 1992 with the following goals: protection of the genetics and diversity of the Serbian flora, research on acclimatization and introduction of species, education of students in the field of biodiversity and environmental protection as well as increasing the biological and ecological culture of citizens. The opening ceremony was held on 8 September 1997.

The first phase of the project was completed in 2000 when the first eight hectares were landscaped. The garden has become one of the tourist attractions of Kragujevac. Since Šumarice Memorial Park is protected as an immovable cultural heritage of exceptional importance, the botanical garden is also under this protection.

== History ==
The concept of founding the Botanical Garden in Kragujevac was first proposed by Josif Pančić in 1847. The realization of this project became more promising after the foundation of the Institute of Biology (now the Institute of Biology and Ecology). As an investor, the Faculty of Science provided preliminary conditions for creating the project in 1993, and in the same year, the general design was elaborated. The Opening Ceremony of the foundation of the Botanical garden was held on 8 September 1997.

Botanical garden Kragujevac is located on a surface area of 18.6 hectares, but the first phase of the realization, the arrangement of the first eight hectares, was completed in 2000.

== Location ==
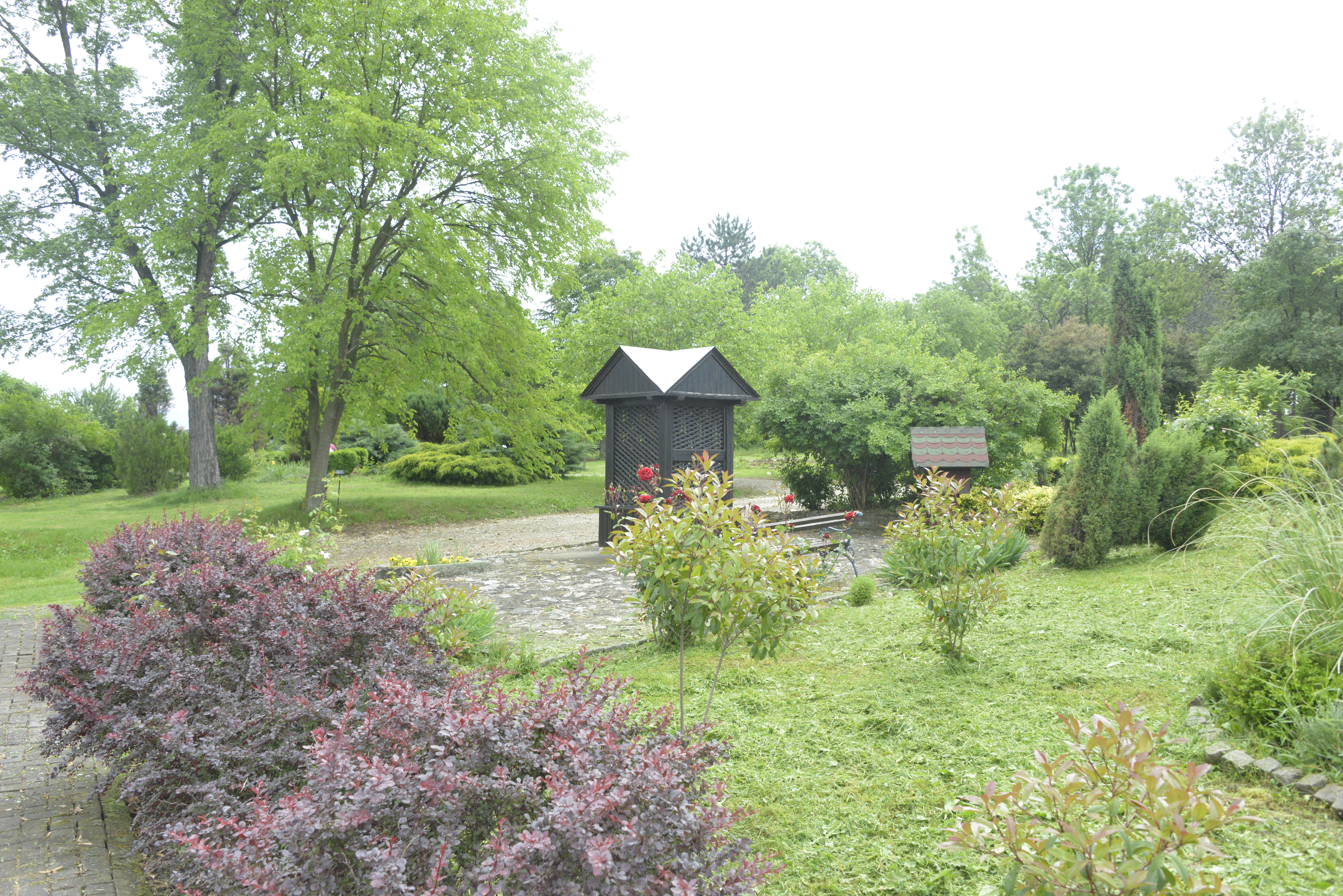
Details from the Garden

Botanical garden Kragujevac is located by the Kragujevac-Gornji Milanovac road. As it is located in the complex of the Šumarice Memorial Park, which is protected as an Immovable Cultural Heritage of Exceptional Importance, the Garden is under this protection too.

It is located at an altitude of 199–221.85 m, with a declination of terrain 6-20%, and exposition north and south. The climate of the area is humid continental with pronounced seasons. The garden is in the habitat of the climax community of Quercus frainetto and Quercus cerris (Quercetum confertae-cerris Rudski).

The geological substrate is heterogeneous and consists of various types of sedimentary and eruptive rocks. In the pedological composition of the soil vertisol is dominant.

== Organisation and activities ==
Within the Botanical Garden, there are three units:

- Exhibition unit, with decorative part, a plateau with the bust of Josif Pančić, arboretum, alpine garden, special collections, and labyrinth with endemic species;
- Administrative-scientific unit;
- Economic-production unit, with tree nursery and greenhouse.

=== Activities ===
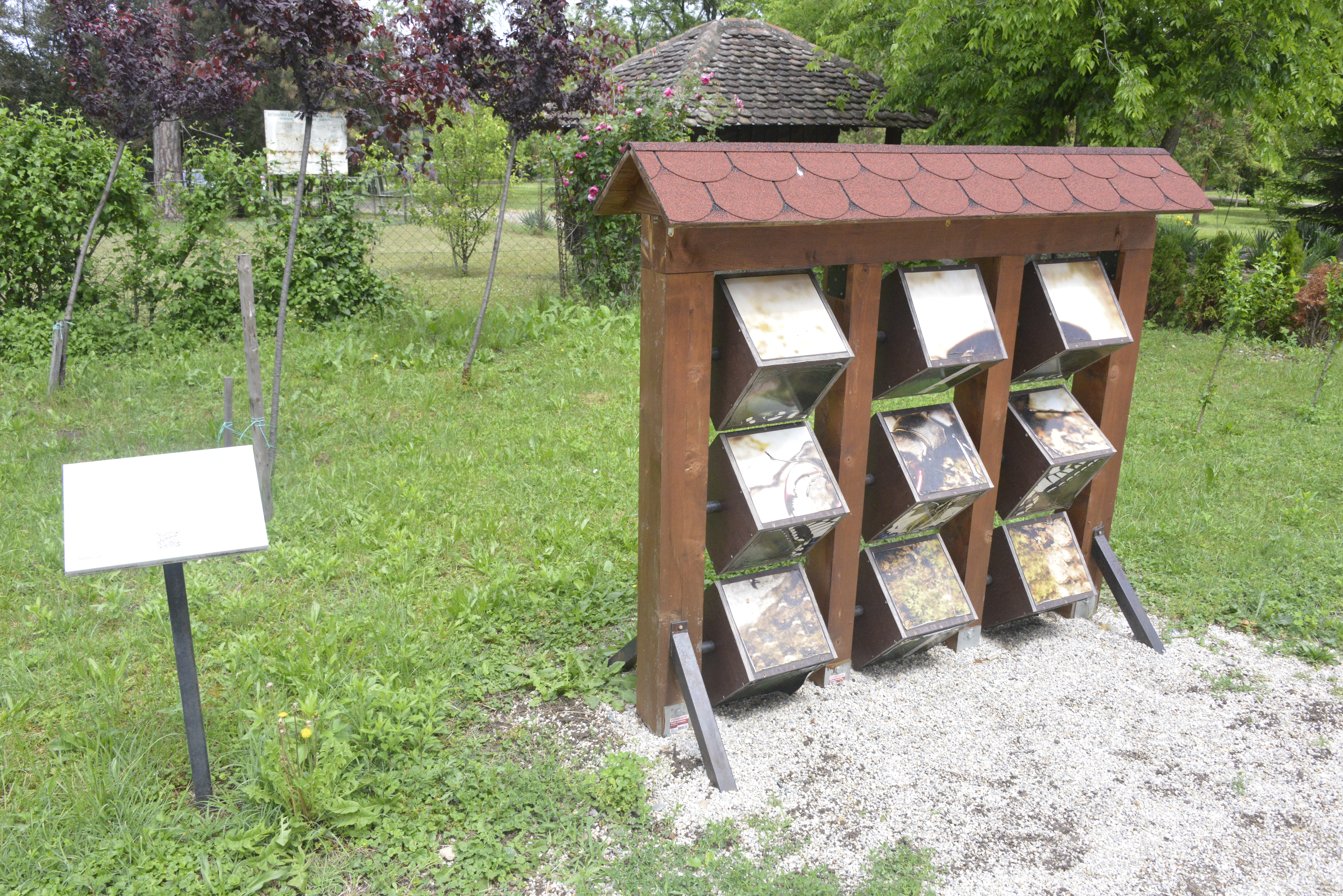
Ecological puzzle for children

The main activities of the Botanical Garden Kragujevac are:

- Contribution to the scientific knowledge in the area of protection and preserving the flora biodiversity, especially in Serbia;
- Contribution to the protection and reintroduction of endangered and rare plant species;
- Promotion of knowledge related to flora both in Serbia and in the world;
- Education of young scientific staff through work with students in master and PhD studies;
- Education of preschool and elementary school children in the area of protection and preservation of biodiversity of flora through the realization of educative workshops;
- Education of wider population on the benefits of biodiversity protection;
- Raising the level of ecological awareness in society with special attention to the place and significance of plants.

=== Exhibition unit and Plant collections ===
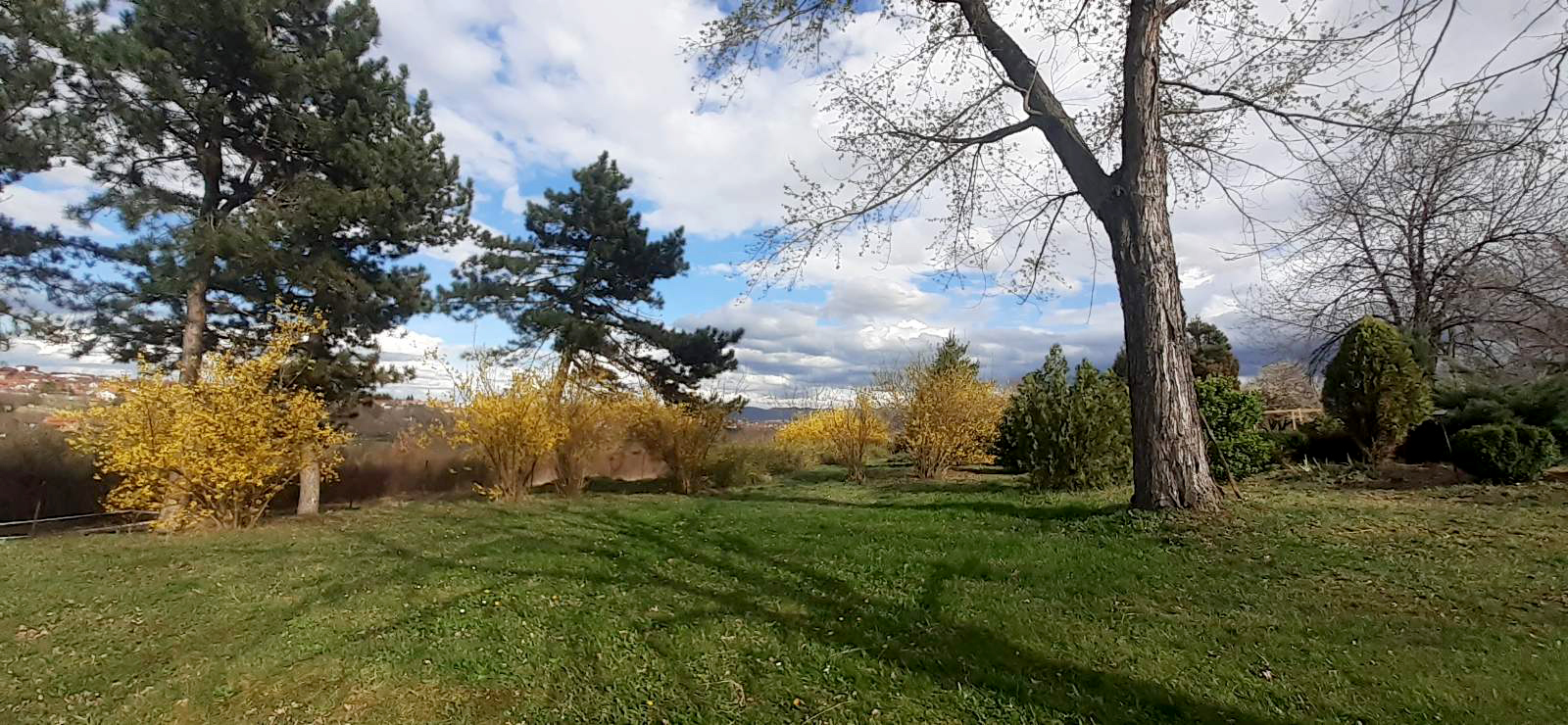
Zone with Balkan endemic species and Tertiary relict areas

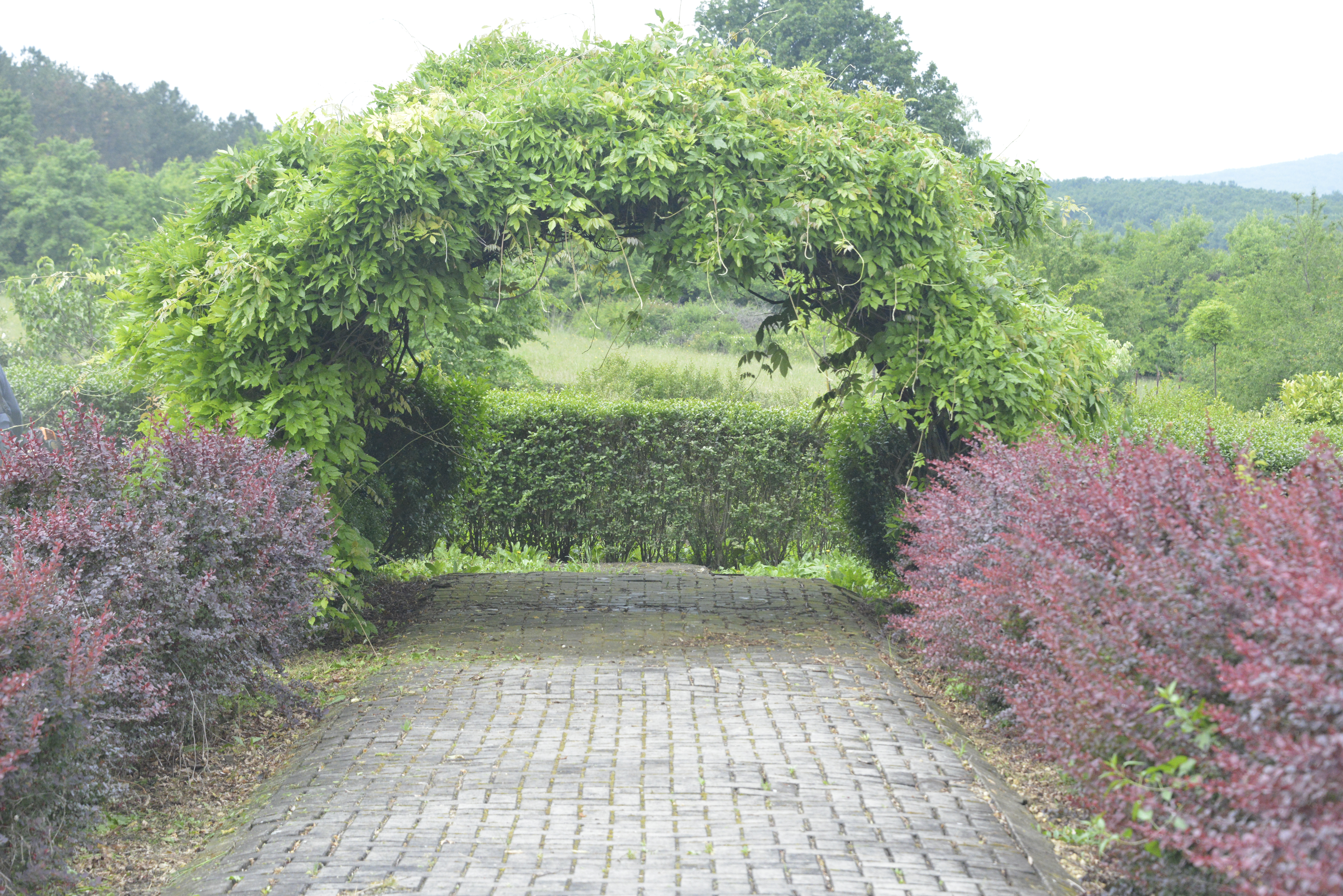
Entrance to the labyrinth

The exhibition unit represents the most valuable part of the Botanical Garden. It includes numerous specific and special thematic zones with different plant species:

- European flora zone — the dominant part of the Garden, which contains the most characteristic representatives of European flora;
- Asian flora zone — the part of the Garden where Asian species can be seen
- Zone with Balkan endemic species and Tertiary relict areas;
- Rock garden with chasmophyte and succulent plants native to Balkans;
- Forest fruit zone with woody and shrubby species from Serbia;
- Arboretum;
- Hedge maze made with native species;
- Zone with Physic garden and Kitchen garden, maintained by students who use some of the grown plants during their exercises and lectures;
- Educational contents in the field of ecology, suitable for children of preschool and school age, children's fun corner with interactive toys and a corner for forest pedagogy;
- Work zone with demonstration gardens, hotbeds, vermicomposting beds and small greenhouse.

== See also ==
- Jevremovac
- Aquarium Center Kragujevac
