= Aquarium Center Kragujevac =

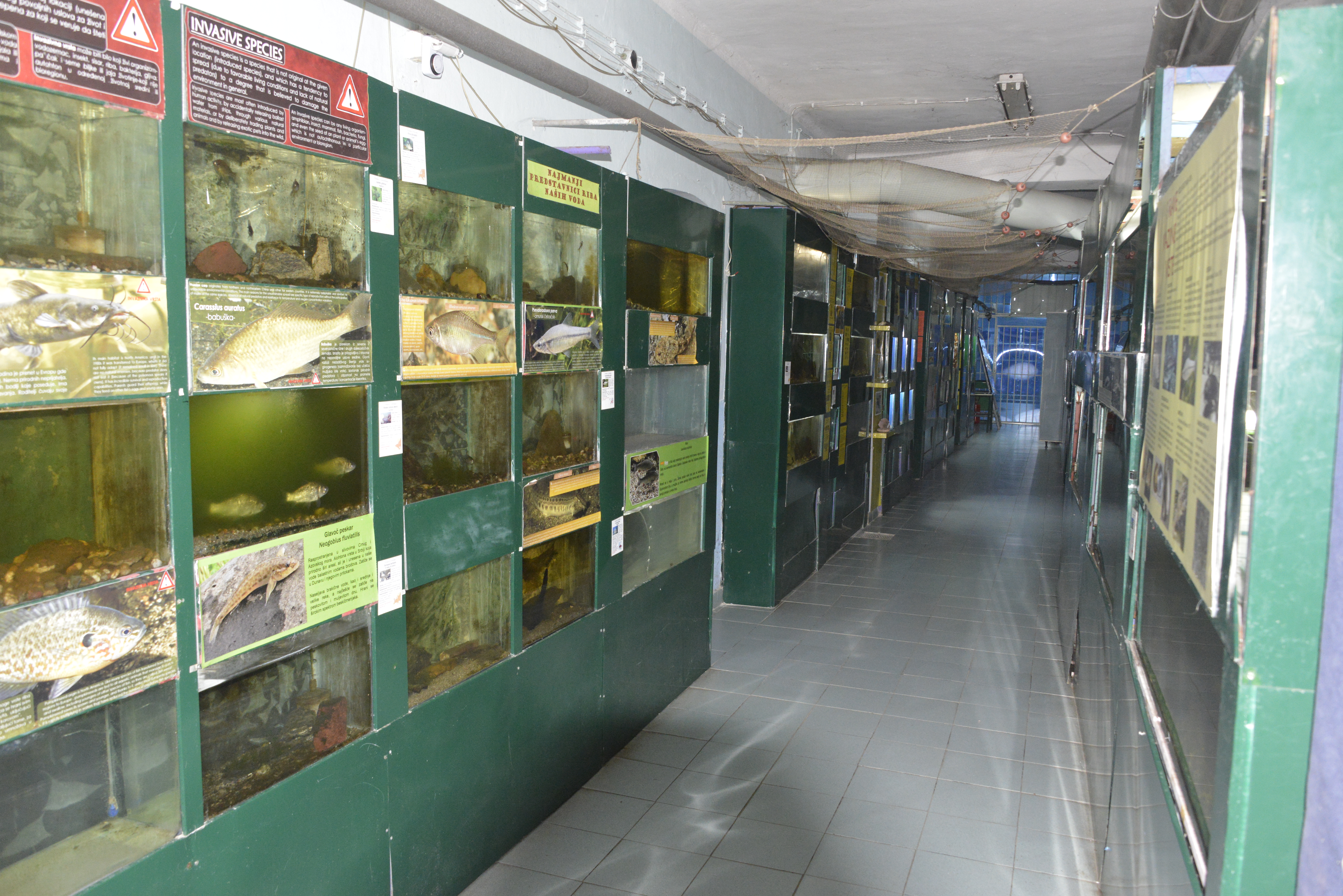
- Interactive map of Aquarium Center Kragujevac
- 44°01′04″N 20°54′24″E
- Date opened: 1999
- Location: Kragujevac, Serbia
- Floor space: 400 m^{2} (4,300 ft^{2})
- No. of species: 600
- Total volume of tanks: 3 million litres
- Annual visitors: 30,000
- Owner: Faculty of Science – University of Kragujevac
- Website: www.pmf.kg.ac.rs/akvarijum/index.php/hometop

Aquarium Center Kragujevac (Aquarium — Centre for Conservation of Biodiversity and Fishing in inland waters; Serbian: Centar za ribarstvo i konzervaciju biodiverziteta kopnenih voda — Akvarijum) is the first and only public freshwater aquarium in Serbia. At the same time it is the largest aquarium and the only aqua zoo in Serbia. It was founded in 1999. Aquarium is organizational unit of the Institute for Biology and Ecology, (Note: Department of Biology and Ecology is the organizational unit of Faculty of Science – University of Kragujevac for education of biological and ecological personnel profiles, teachers for primary and secondary schools, as well as researchers who will apply their knowledge in pedagogical, scientific and economic activities. The activities related to education and scientific researches are partly performed in separate organizational units such as Aquarium, Botanical garden and Centre for Preclinical Testing of Active Substances – CPCTAS.) at Faculty of Science in Kragujevac, and is located in the premises of this scientific institution. It covers 400 square meters, and its capacity is 60,000 l. It is part of the tourist offer of the city of Kragujevac.

== Activities ==
Aquarium — Centre for Conservation of Biodiversity and Fishing in inland waters is an organizational unit of the Institute for Biology and Ecology, at Faculty of Science. It has the status of a scientific research, innovative, development and service center in the field of applied hydroecology. The center has long-term cooperation with the economy and provides the following services:

Biological monitoring of water:

- Scientific and professional studies in the field of protection of aquatic ecosystems and sustainable use - ecological water management
- Ecological and biological monitoring of inland waters according to the standards of the European Water Directive

Ecological restoration of aquatic ecosystems:

- Rehabilitation, revitalization and ecoremediation of aquatic ecosystems
- Designing biological systems for water purification

Sustainable fishing:

- Assessment of the sustainability of the fish stock and the Study of the Fisheries Area Management Program
- Commercial freshwater pond projects
- Branch aquaculture projects of wild species of fish and crustaceans in order to produce edible fish and preserve natural populations
- Trout and carp repopulation projects with the aim of repopulation of endangered species and stocking
- Projects of public aquariums
- Genetic sperm biobank and artificial fertilization of fish

Educational tourism and ecotourism:

- Educational eco-tourism
- Workshops and seminars

== Collections ==
The basic exhibit occupies the largest area of the aquarium and consists of geographical units that are organized to include the fauna of Serbia, Europe and distant continents. There are also special units that illustrate different types of pollution of aquatic ecosystems.

In the exhibition area of the Aquarium, there is a rich collection of freshwater organisms from Serbia and the Balkan Peninsula (trout, barbell, esox, perch, catfish...), Europe, Asia, Africa, America and Australia, including fish from tropical waters (scalare, piranha, discus...), amphibians (frogs and salamanders), reptiles (turtles and snakes), and invertebrates (leeches, crawfishes…). Since 2016, the Aquarium's collection includes representatives of marine organisms.

The most interesting species that can be seen in Aquarium are carnivorous piranhas and a very rear and endangered African Lungfish, which represents a transitional shape between fish and amphibians.

Aquarium also includes:

- An experimental hatchery for keeping and breeding rare species of fish, which is used for scientific and professional work,
- Laboratory for hydrobiological research in the field of water monitoring and protection and conservation of terrestrial water biodiversity and
- Center for cryopreservation.
Species in the Aquarium

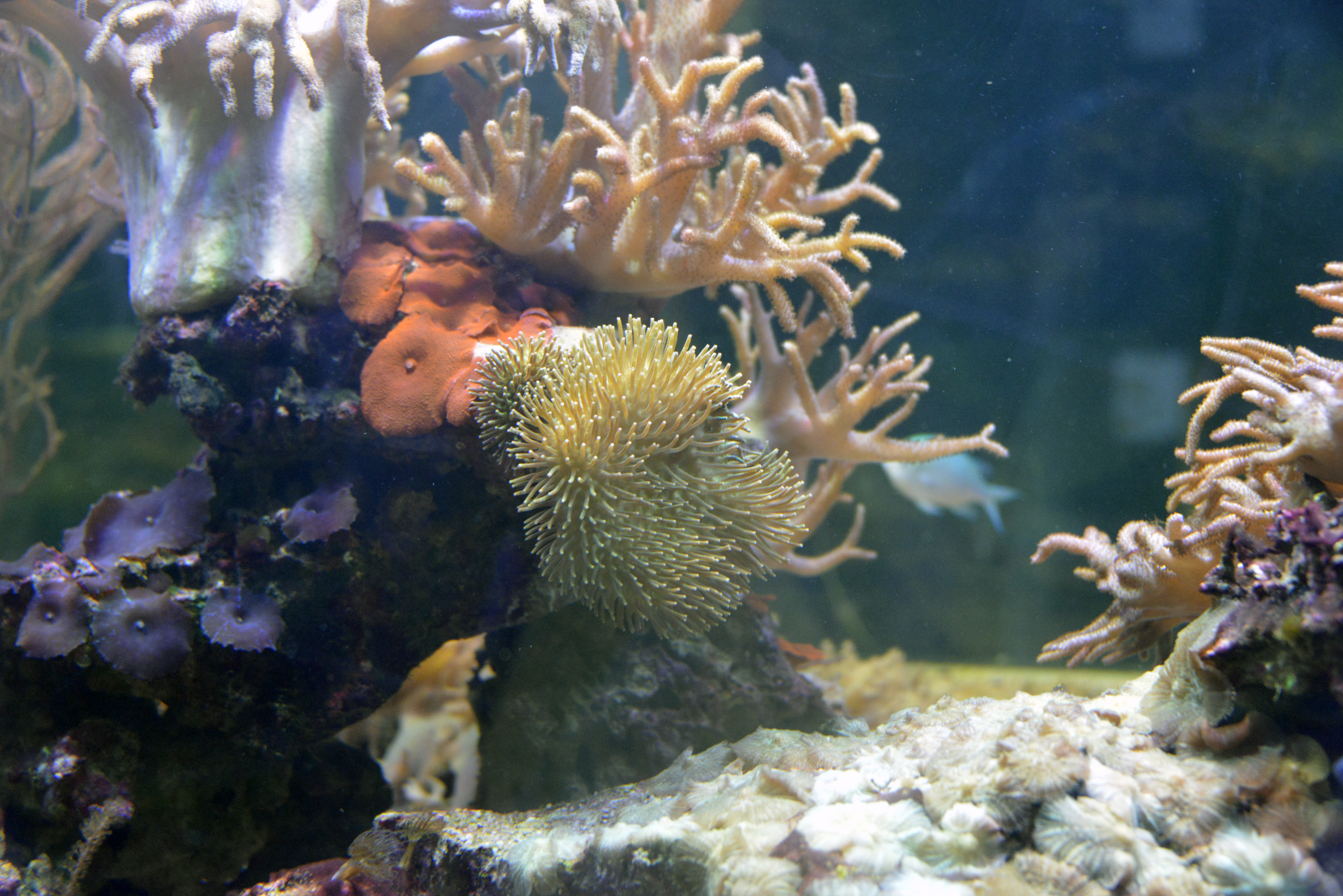

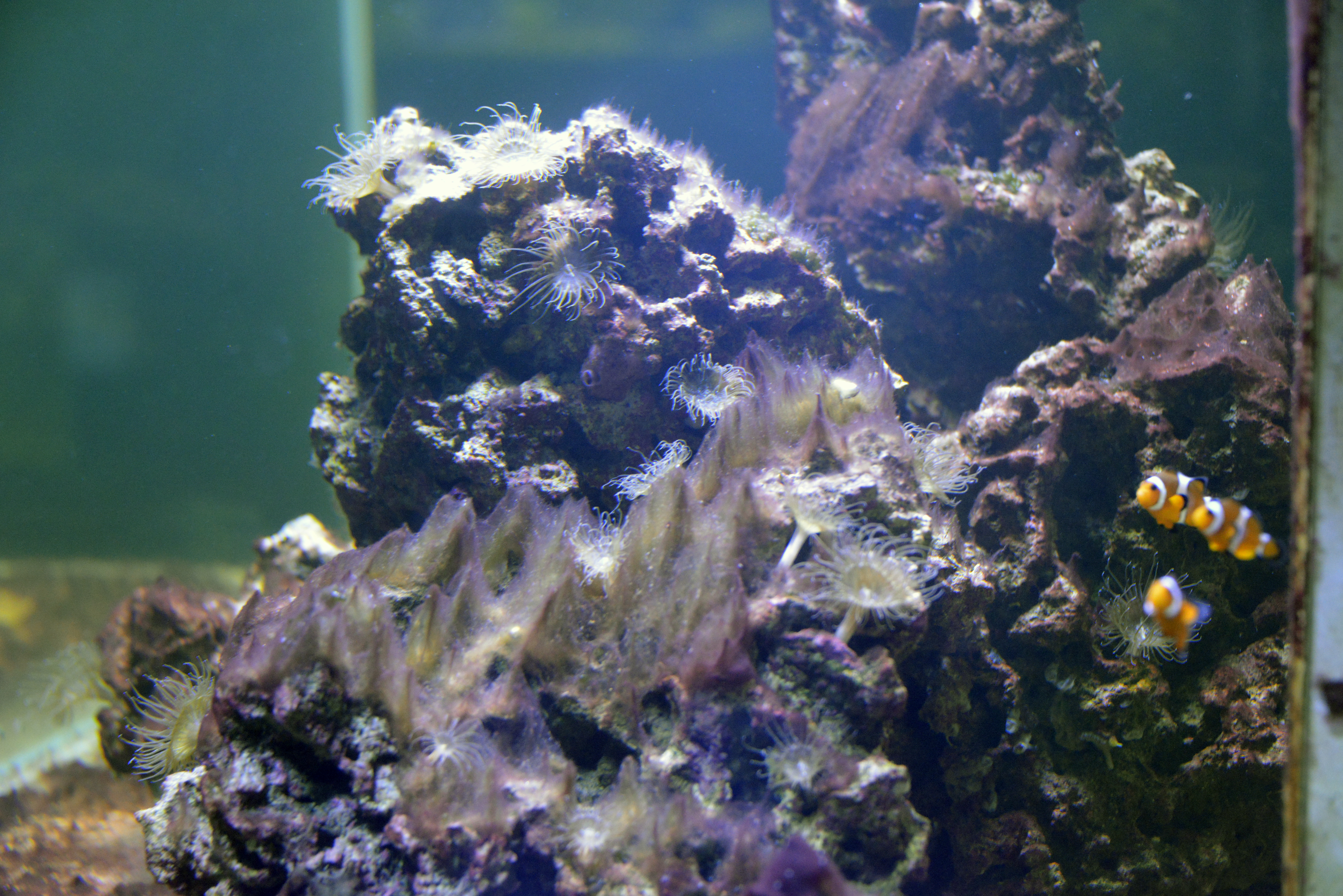

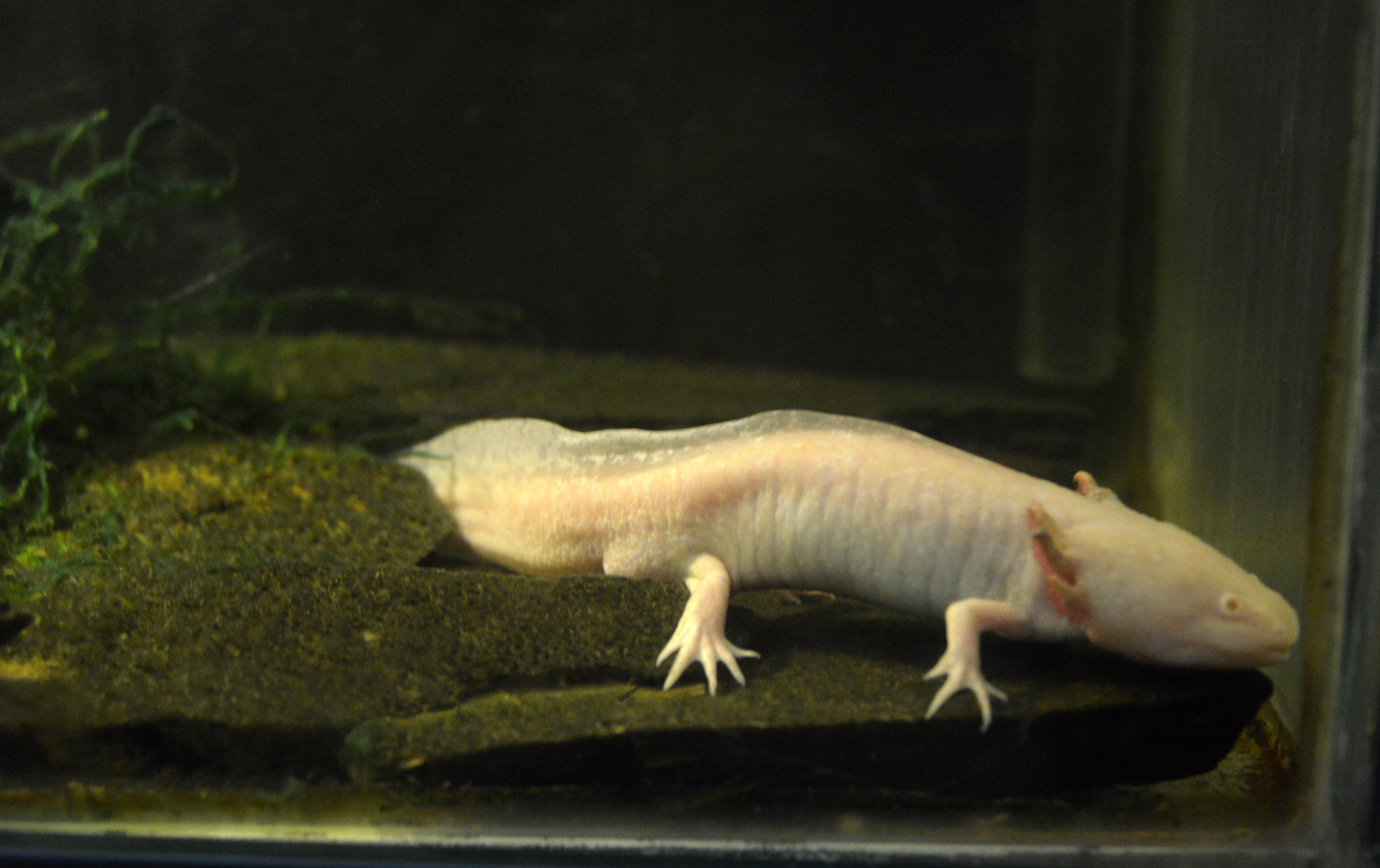

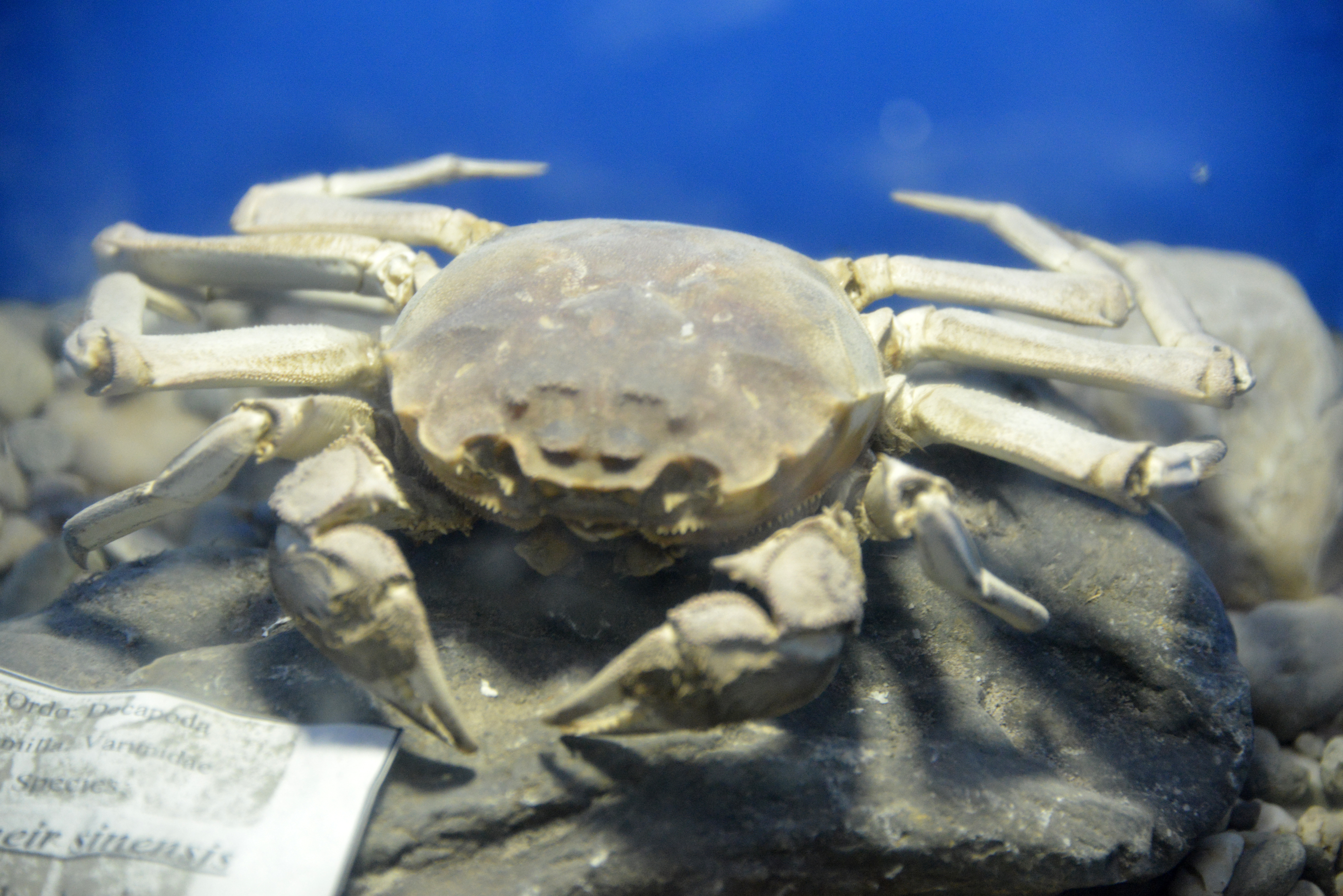

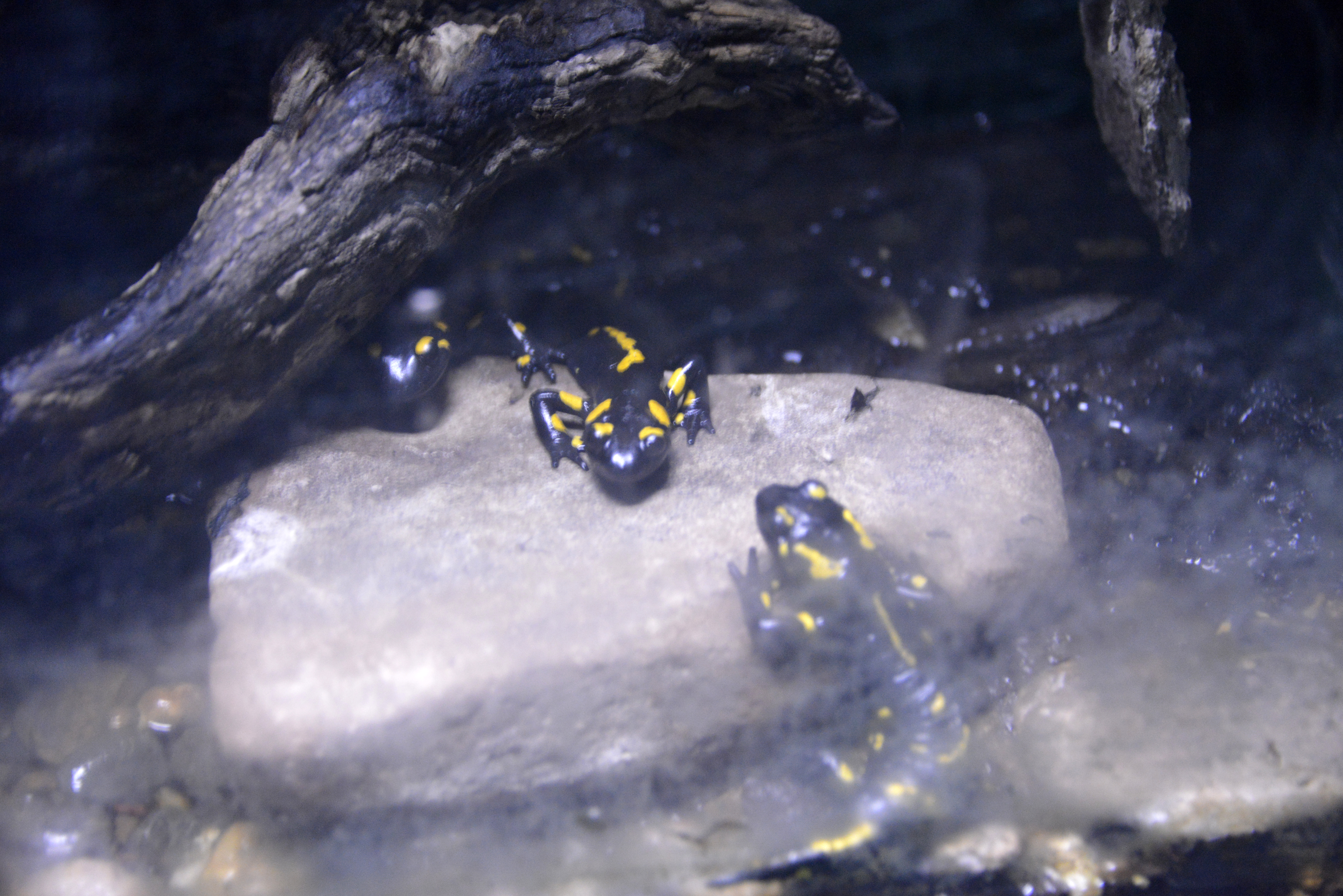

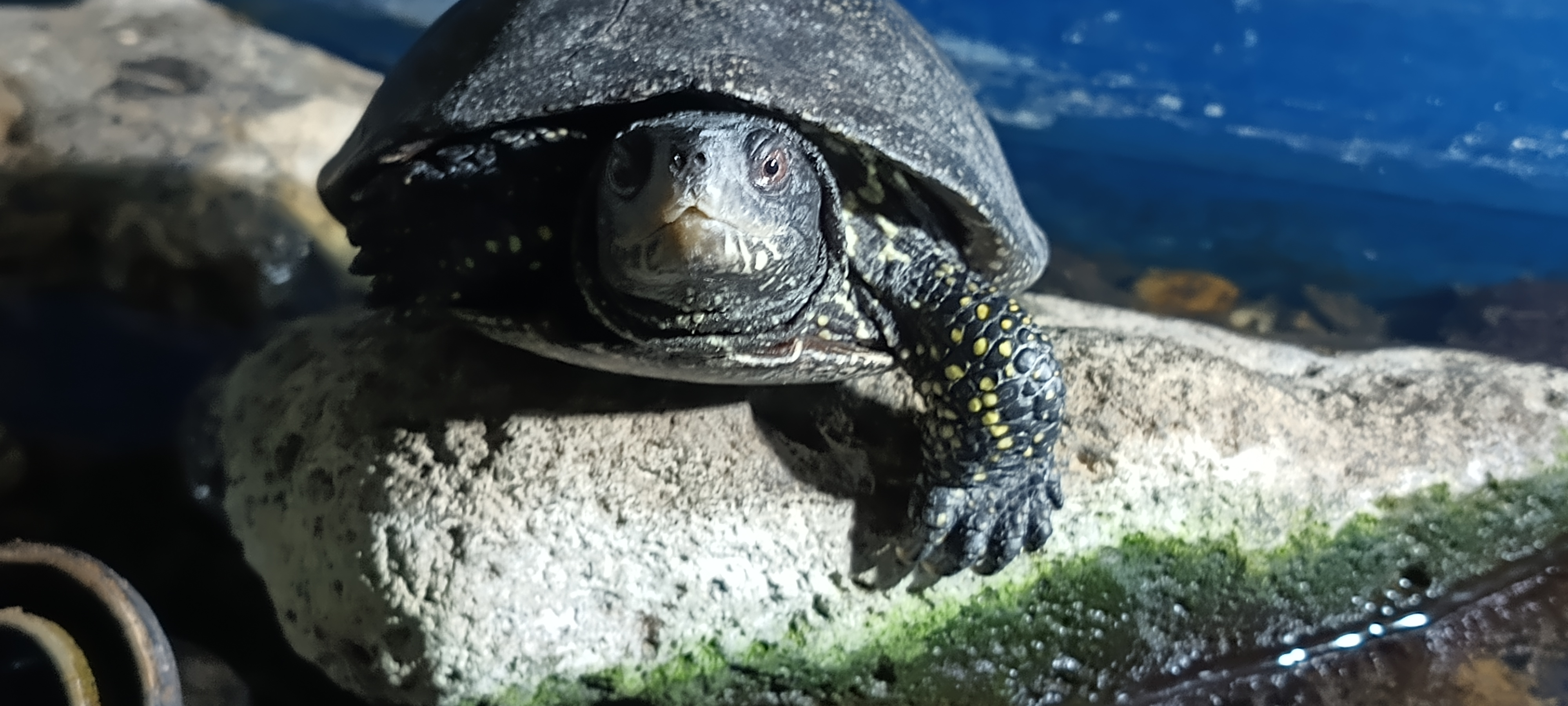

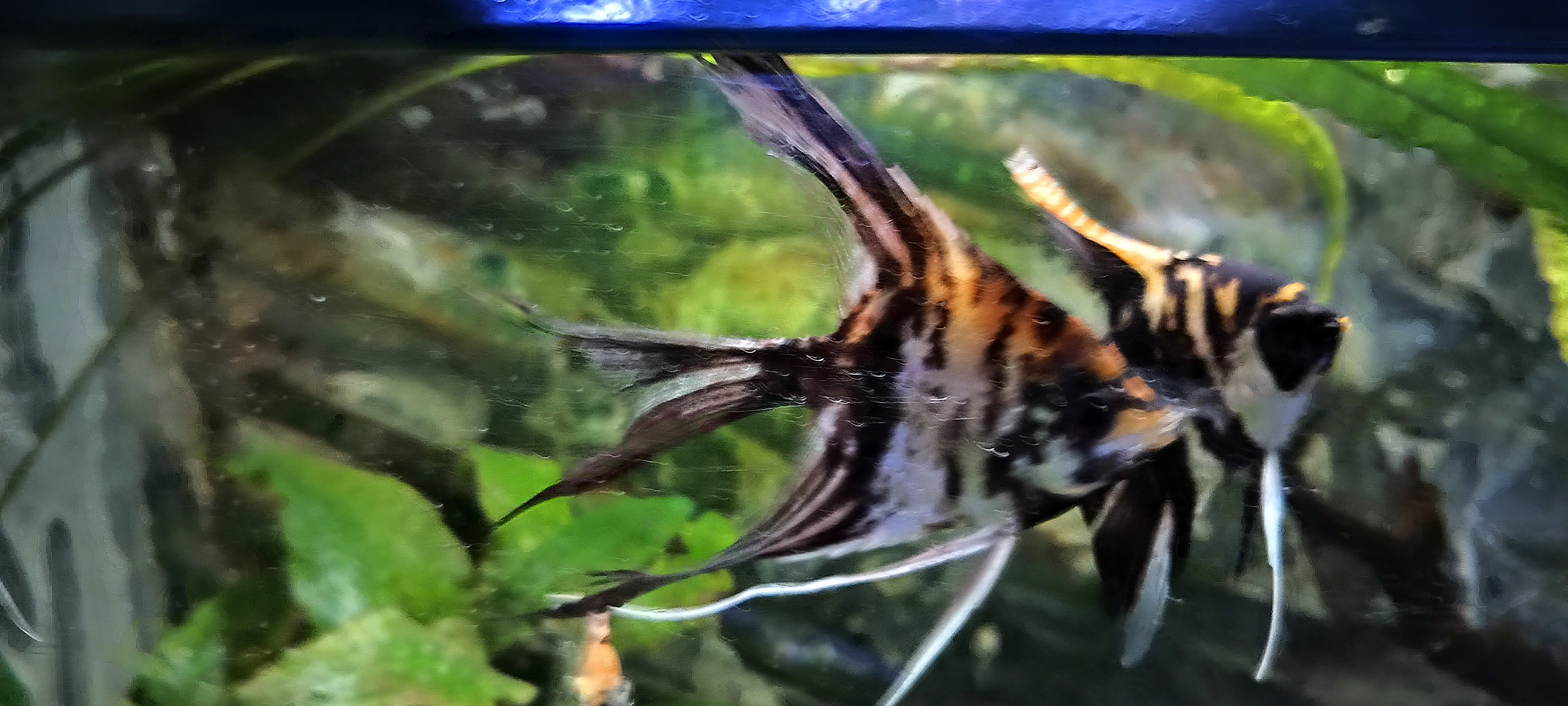

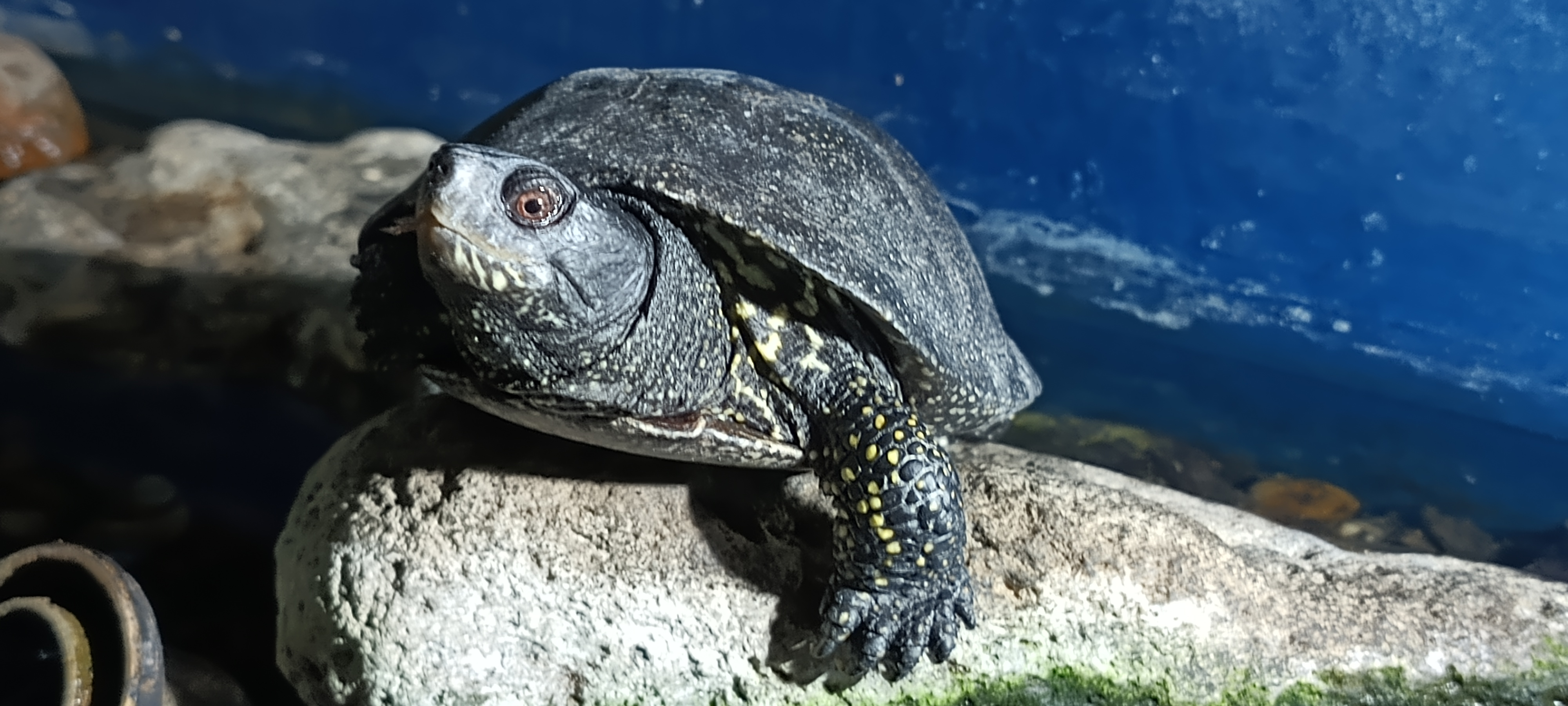

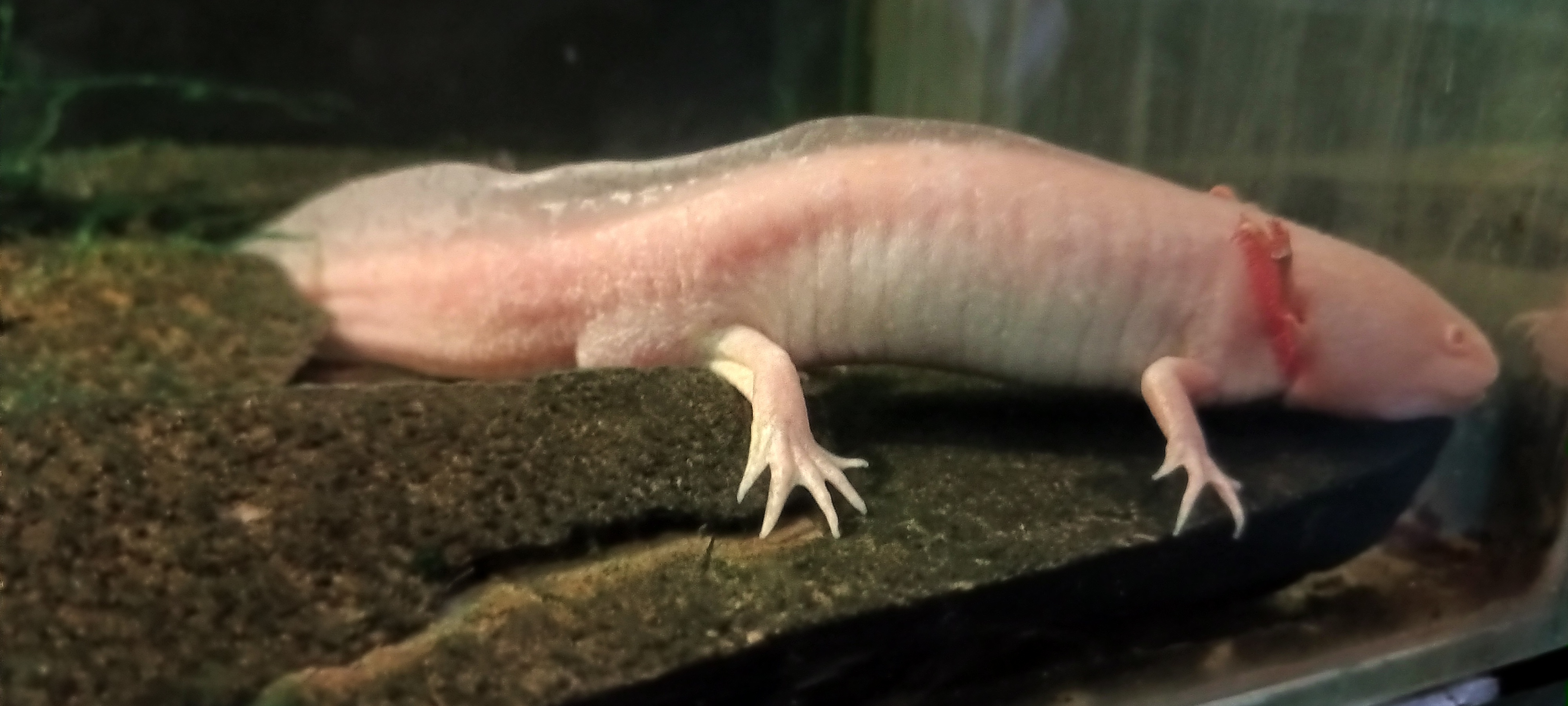

== See also ==
- Aquarium Boka
- Botanical Garden Kragujevac
- Jevremovac
