= Aquarium Boka =

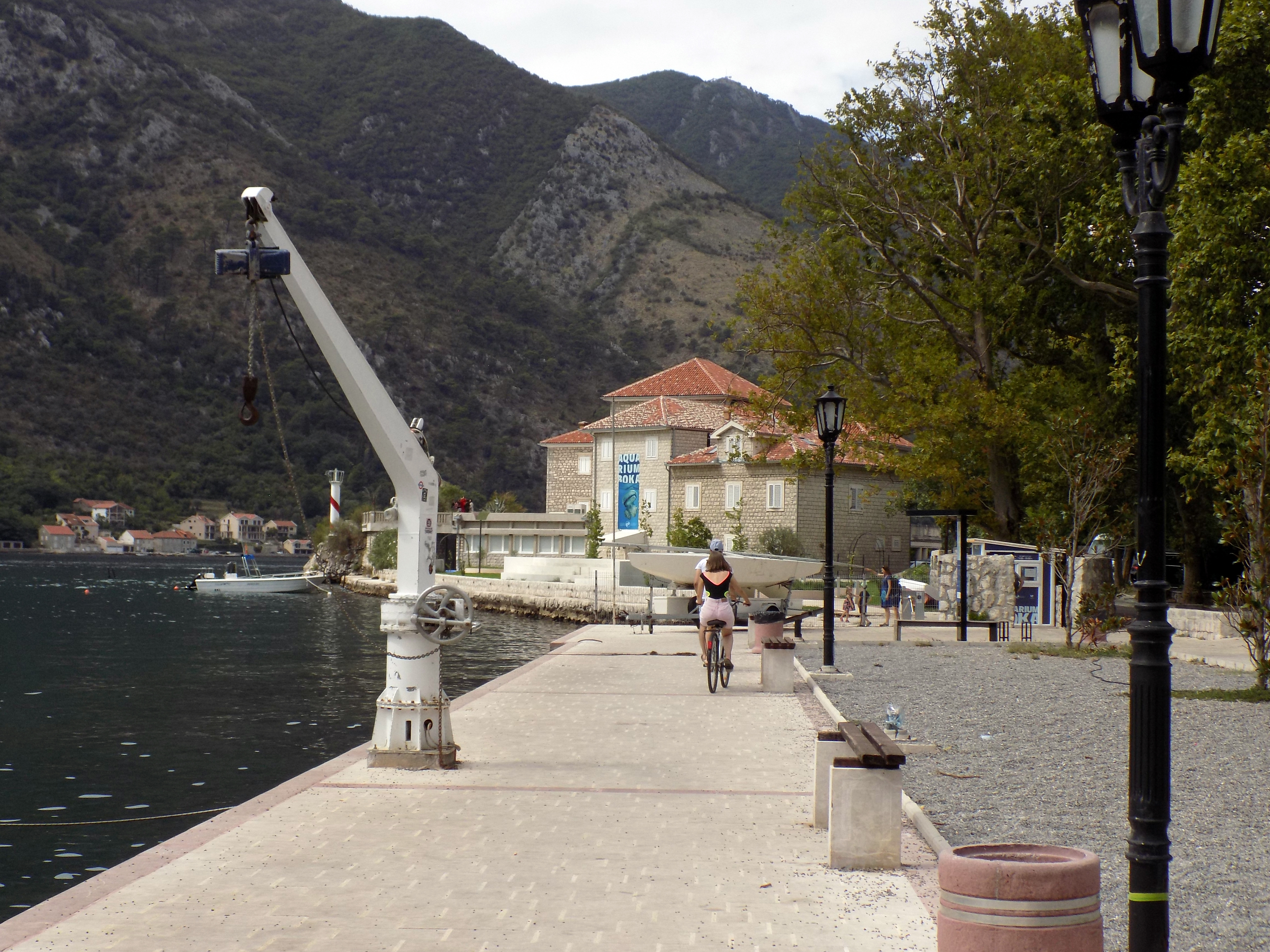
- Interactive map of Aquarium Boka
- 42°26′10.2″N 18°45′50.6″E
- Date opened: 2021
- Location: Kotor, Montenegro
- No. of species: 60
- Owner: Institute for Marine Biology of the University of Montenegro
- Website: aquariumboka.ucg.ac.me

Aquarium Boka (Adriatic Biodiversity Conservation Center ″Aquarium Boka″; Serbian: Centar za očuvanje morskog biodiverziteta ″Akvarijum Boka″) is the organizational unit of the Institute for Marine Biology of the University of Montenegro, founded in 2020, and it was officially opened to the public in June 2021. It is the first and only public aquarium in Montenegro, and in the first three months, the Aquarium was visited by more than 8,000 people.

The aquarium is located in the Radoničić Palace, which was built at the beginning of the 19th century.

The Institute for Marine Biology is a unique institution in Montenegro that combines research and education to promote and practice the efficient conservation of marine wildlife.

== History ==
The Institute of Marine Biology in Kotor (IMB) is the only institution in the southern Adriatic involved in the study, protection, and conservation of marine biodiversity and water catchment areas. Thirty years ago, a specialized laboratory was formed, with infrastructure for growing and studying the biology and ecology of marine and freshwater organisms (aquariums, circular pools, cold rooms, etc.). However, this part of the IMB is no longer functional and without reconstruction, its further use for research and public purposes is not possible.

The IMB is granted by the Norwegian Ministry of Foreign Affairs to implement a project ″Marine Biodiversity Conservation Center Boka Aquarium – MonteAqua″. The project is under implementation between December 4, 2017, and June 1, 2020. The planned project's effect on society is enhanced Montenegrin EU integration process in the area of nature protection relevant to water ecosystems and sustainable management of protected water ecosystems. One of the main activities of the MonteAqua project is building reconstruction of the ground floor of the IMB, of about 300 sqm. It is creating infrastructural pre-conditions to host the Center for Marine Biodiversity Conservation with Aquarium Boka and Kotor Adriatic Rescue Center for marine wildlife. Funds are also allocated for purchasing the equipment for the aquarium.

== Concept and organisation ==
Mediterranean moray in Aquarium Boka

Jellyfish in Aquarium Boka

The center has two units: a public aquarium and a rescue center for sea turtles. Aquarium has 18 tanks divided into four exhibition units:

- The World Sea and Mediterranean Sea,
- Adriatic Sea and South Adriatic,
- Boka Bay and
- tropical seas.

The Marine Biodiversity Conservation Center “Aquarium Boka” is a unique institution in Montenegro that integrates research and education for promoting and practicing effective conservation on behalf of the sea's wildlife. Aquarium builds public awareness and action for protecting Adriatic Sea species and habitats, but also actively contributes to various conservation solutions and serve as role models. The establishing of the center is especially important from the aspect of opening the possibilities for closer cooperation between science and business entities, particularly those engaged in fishing, as well as aquaculture, production of fish, and seafood products. Rescue Center develops capacities in Montenegro for rescuing endangered sea species. The center as a whole strengthens the position of Montenegro in terms of regional and international scientific cooperation in the field of conservation of biological resources of aquatic ecosystems. And most importantly, Aquarium moves people to act on behalf of the marine species we seek to protect.

Adriatic Biodiversity Conservation Center ″Aquarium Boka″ operates in three directions:

- protection of endangered species, their preservation in controlled conditions and possible future repopulation,
- public education and
- new attraction in the tourist offer of the city of Kotor.

=== Contents ===
The Center for the Preservation of Biodiversity of the Adriatic "Aquarium Boka" promotes the necessity of preserving biodiversity. In addition to the rich collection with more than 60 species of marine organisms, some fascinating facts can be discovered in the Boka Aquarium about: World sea, Mediterranean Sea, Adriatic Sea, Seahorses, Fish of the Adriatic Sea, Sharks and Rais, Octopus, Moray and Conger eels, Jellyfish, Sea urchins and Starfish, Sea turtles, introduced and invasive species, Bay of Kotor etc.

The species in the Aquarium are inhabited from nature, because it is a much cheaper way of obtaining species, but the maintenance of these organisms is very difficult. These are usually organisms from the wild that are brought by numerous sports and commercial fishermen, or collected by the scientists and researchers of the institute during fieldwork. There are also special procedures for how some of these organisms will be caught and preserved, because not every caught fish can survive the physical injuries they suffer. All new organisms that arrive at Boka Aquarium from the wild must undergo a special 15-day quarantine in special pools, in the technical part of the building, before being introduced into the tanks. During that period, they are under special supervision, primarily so that they do not transfer any diseases or parasites that they may carry with them to the aquarium.

=== Impact of the project ===
The expected impact of the project is an enhanced process of Montenegro's accession to the European Union in the field of nature protection in relation to aquatic ecosystems and sustainable management of protected aquatic ecosystems.

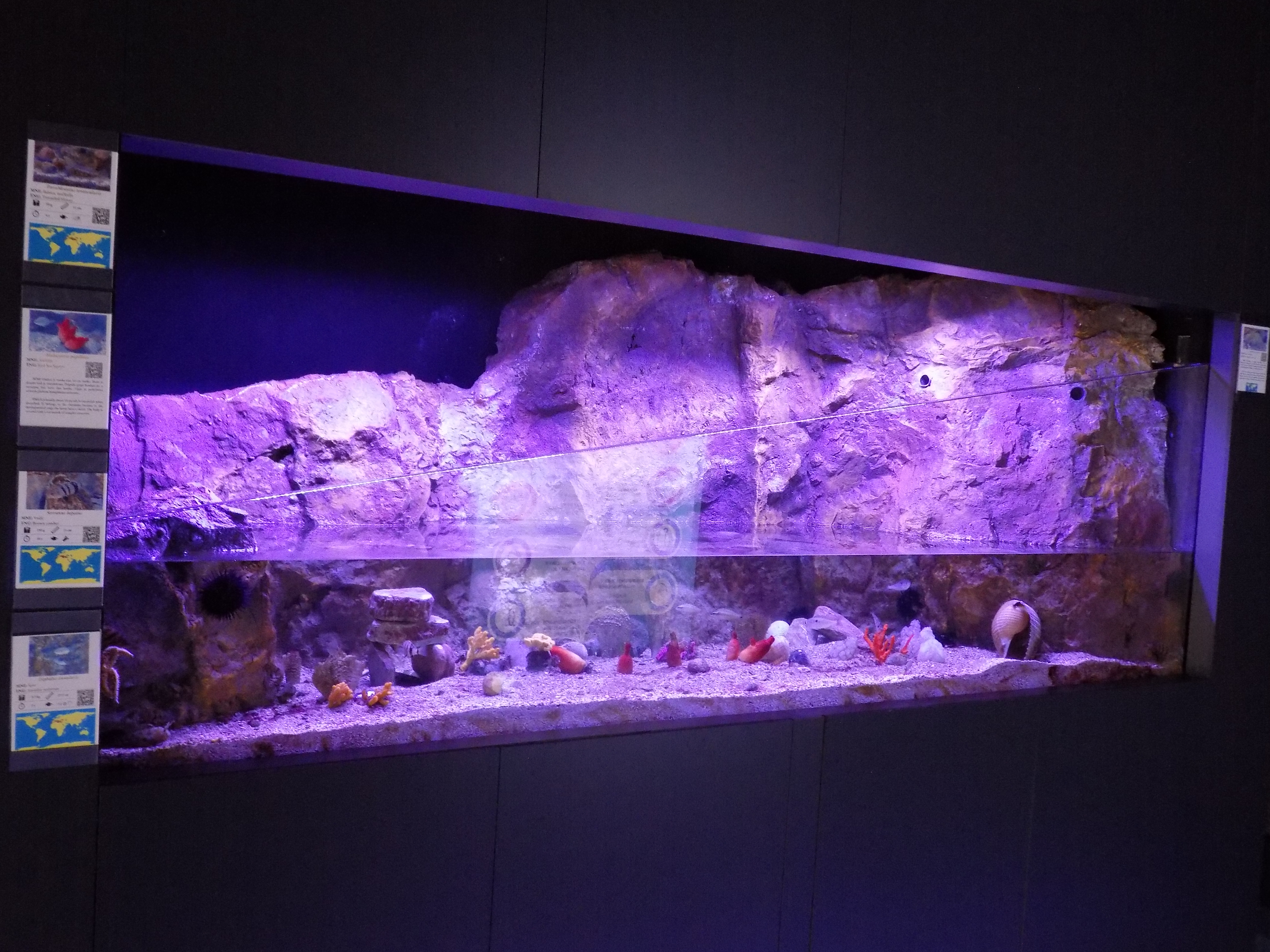

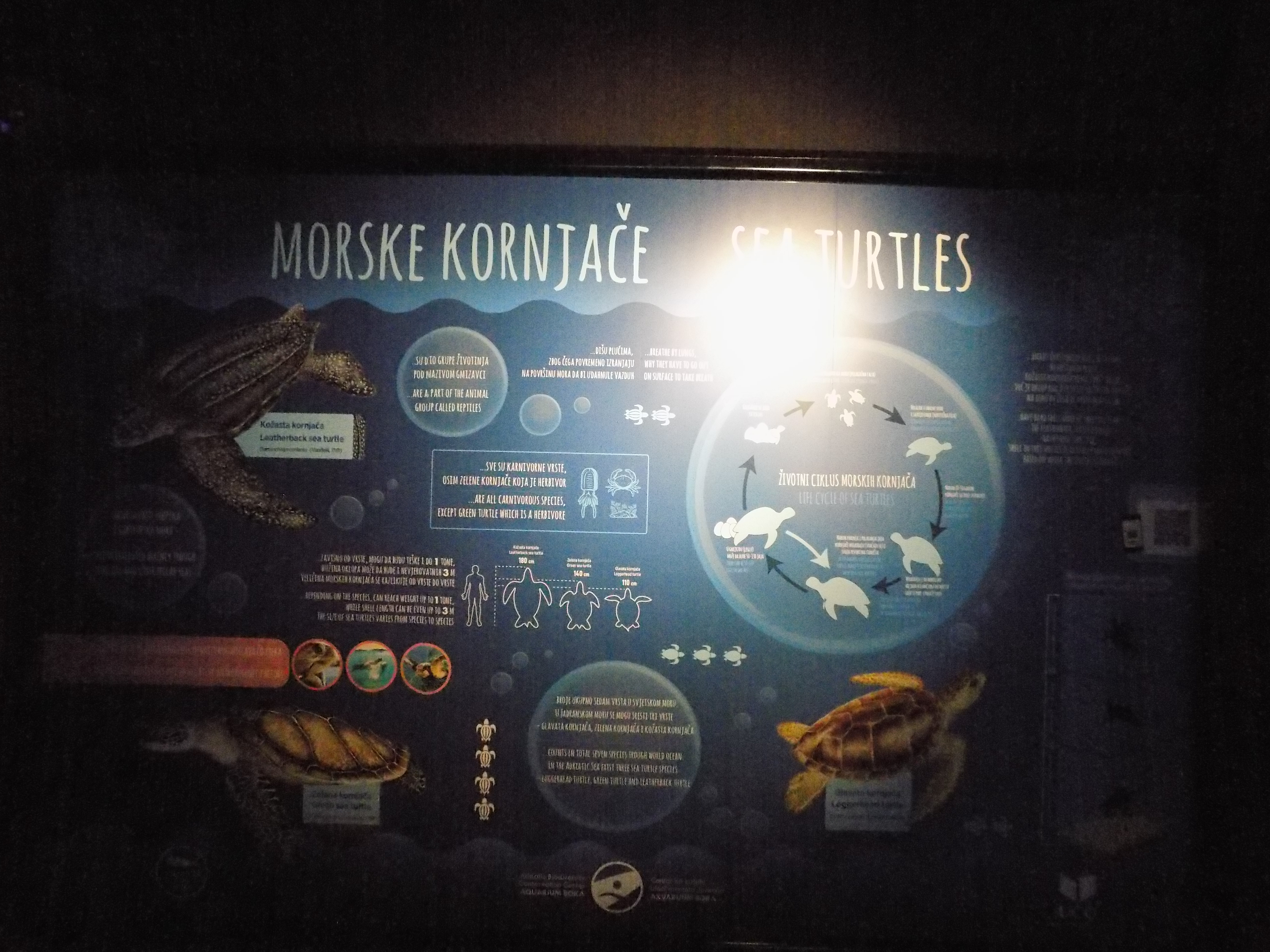

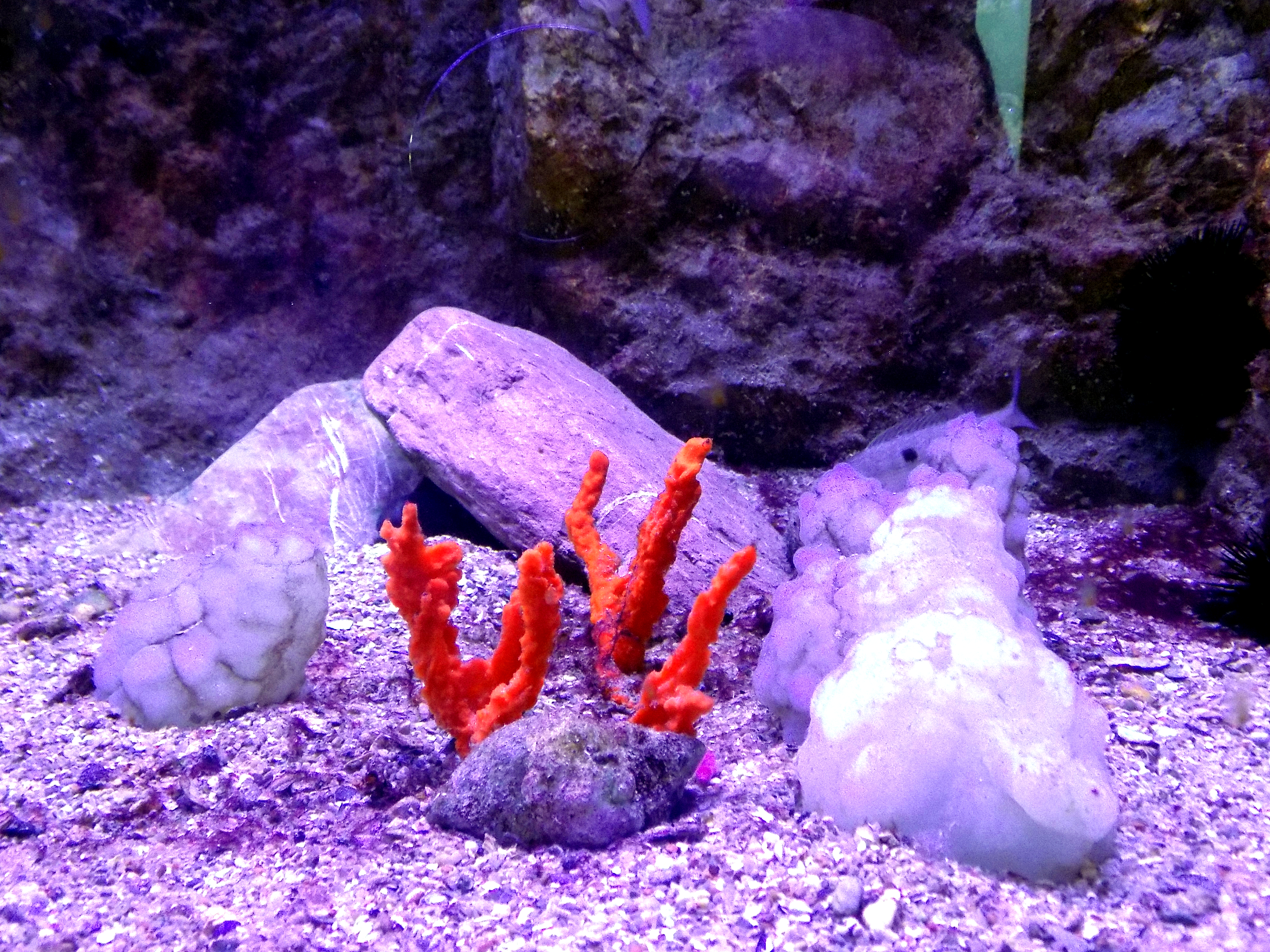

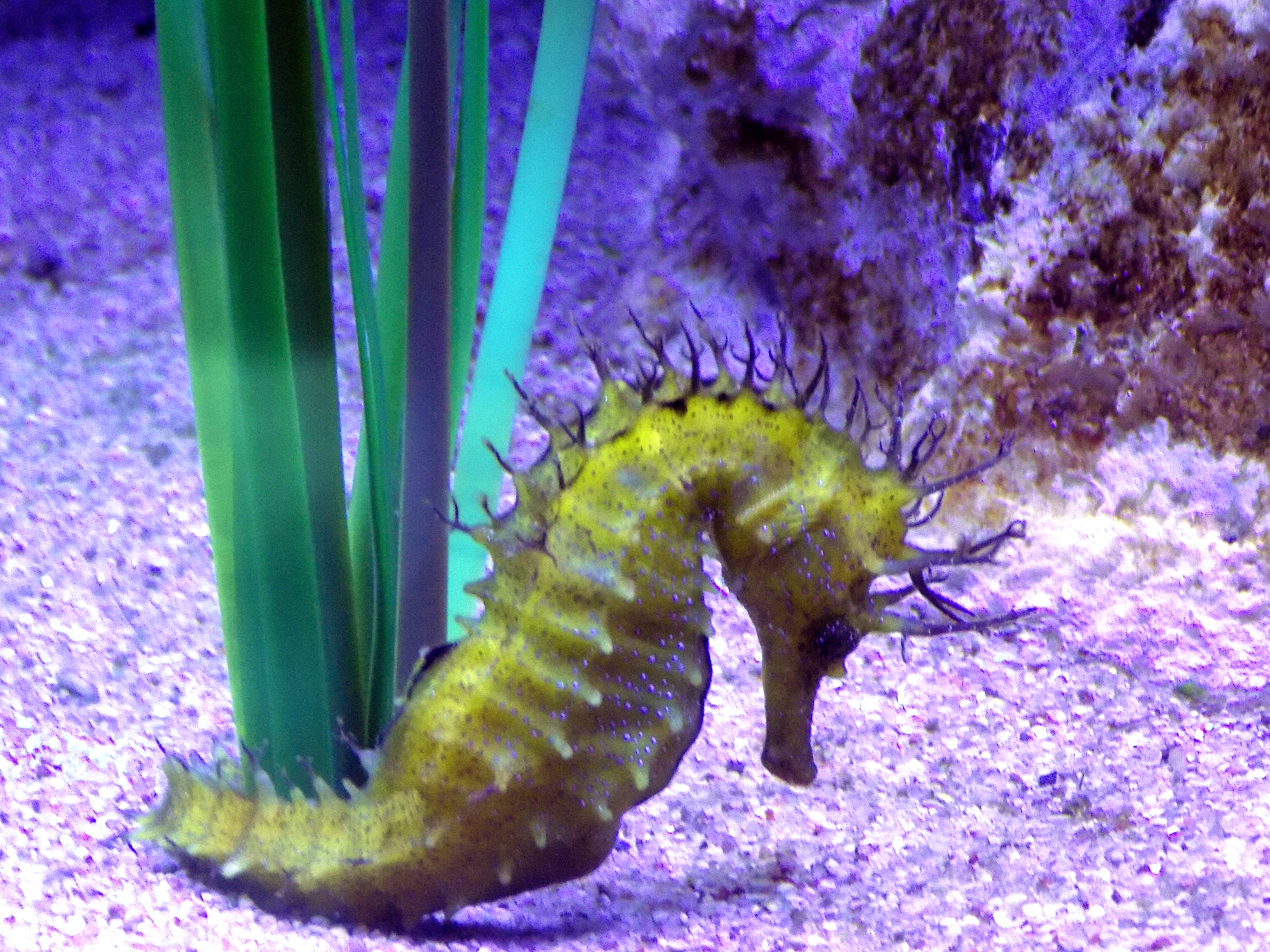

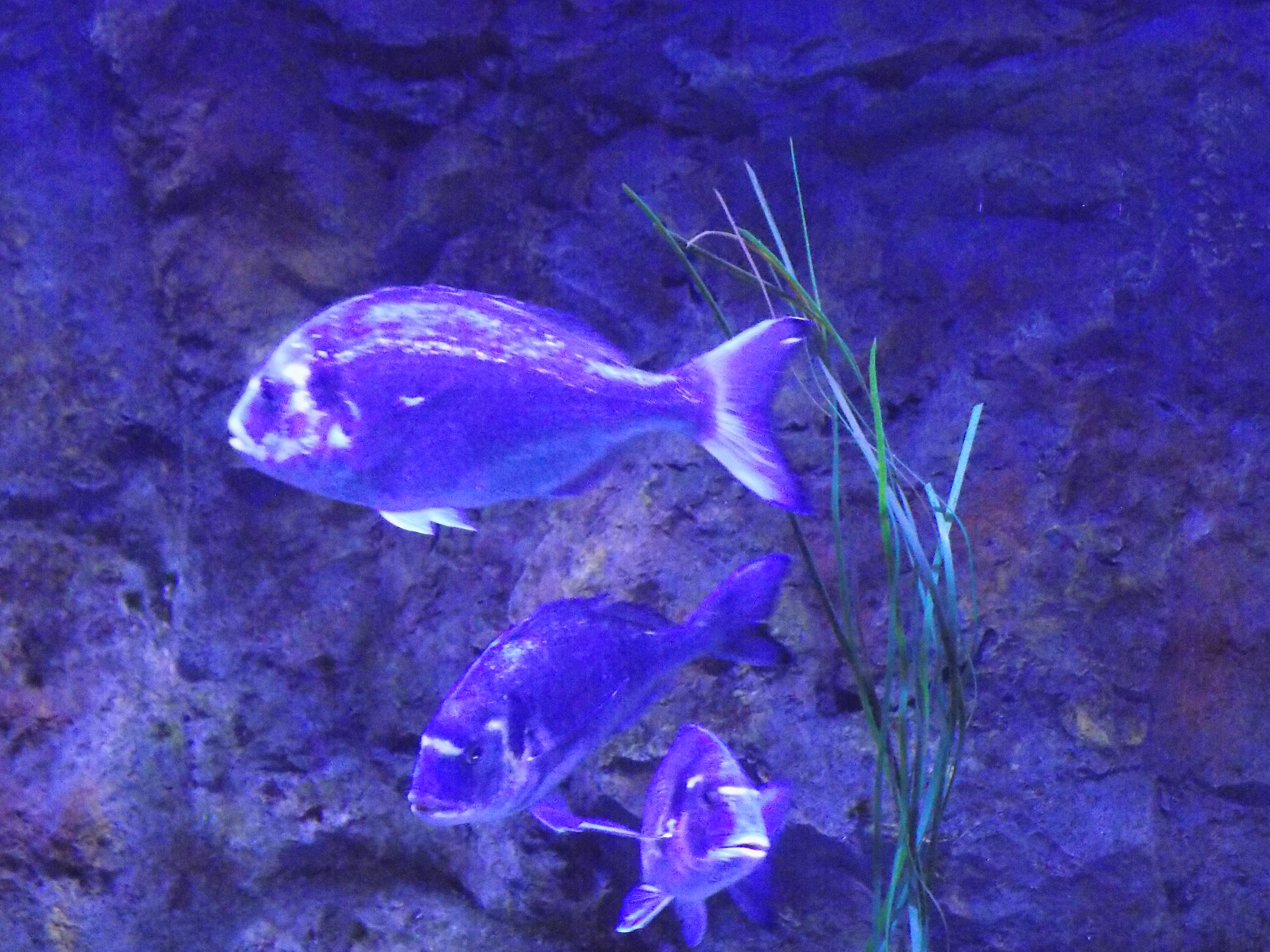

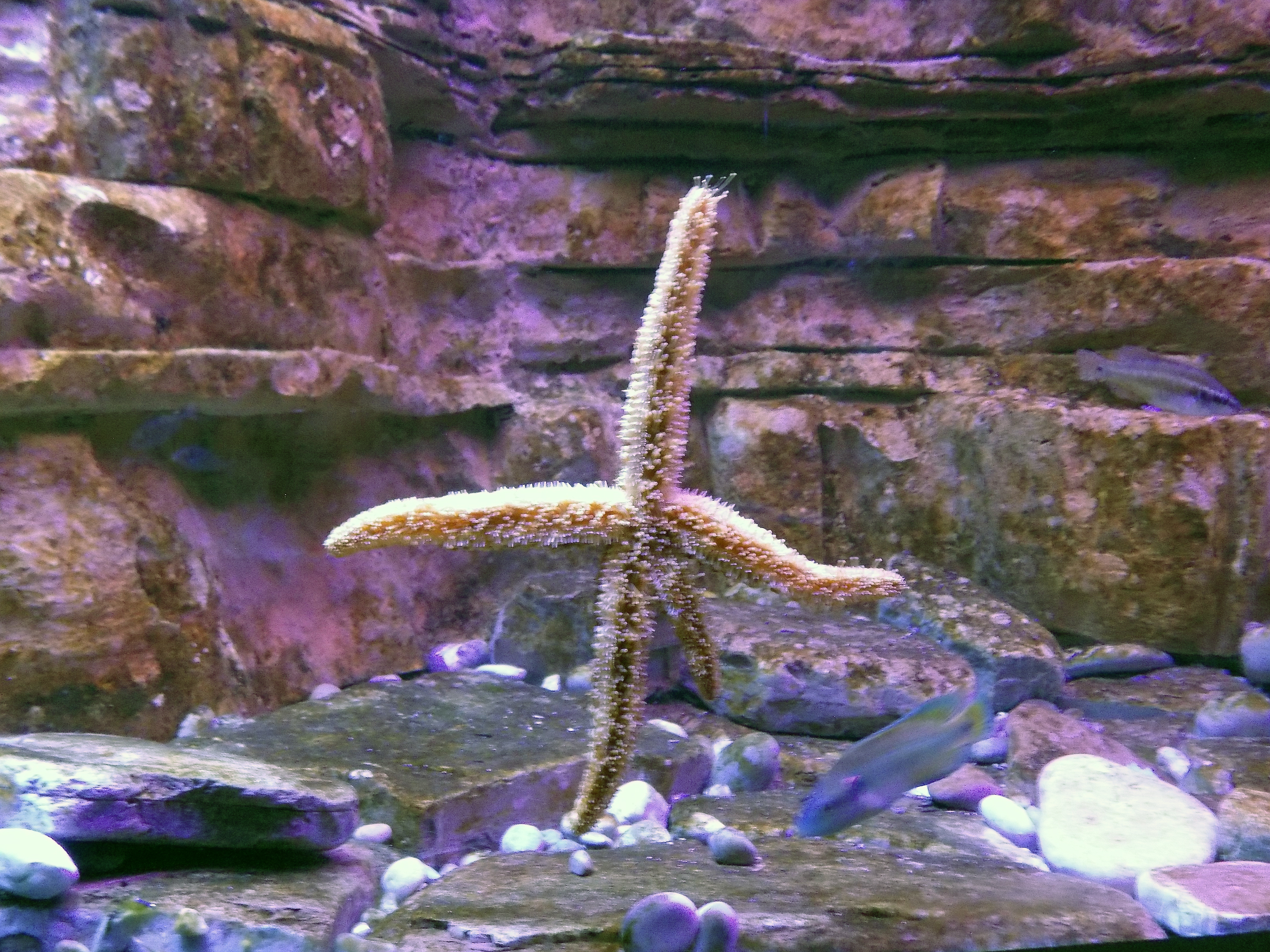

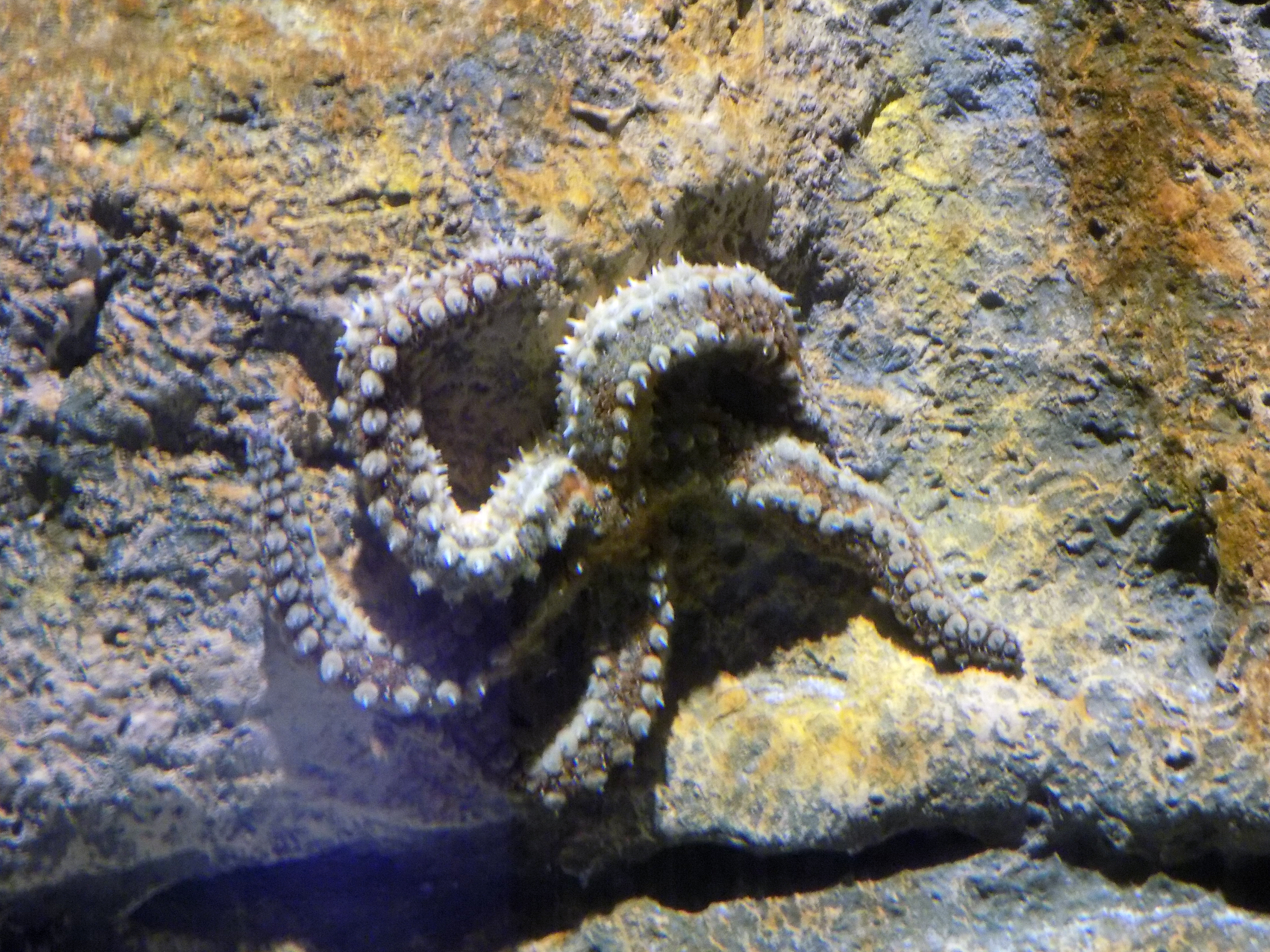

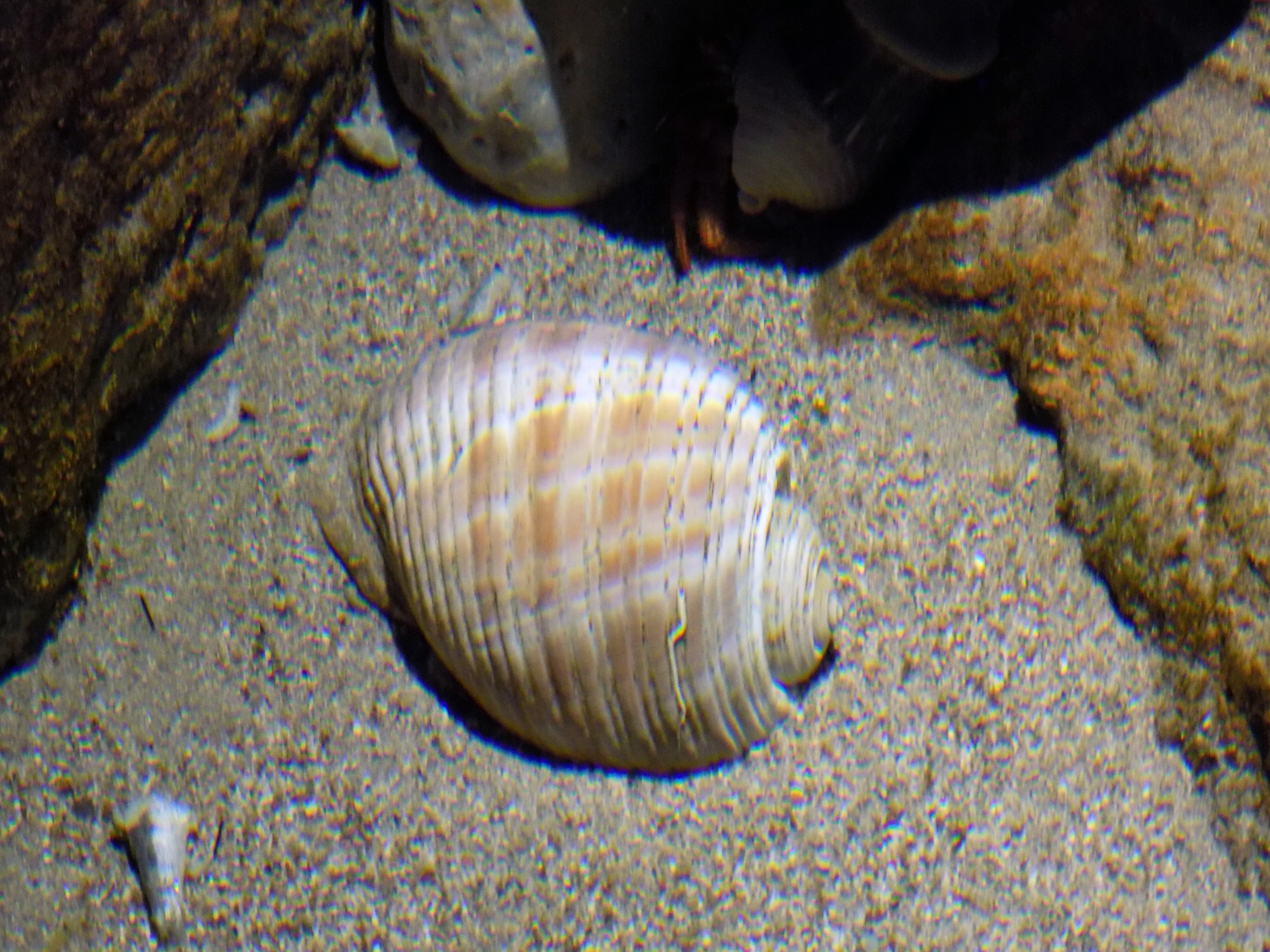

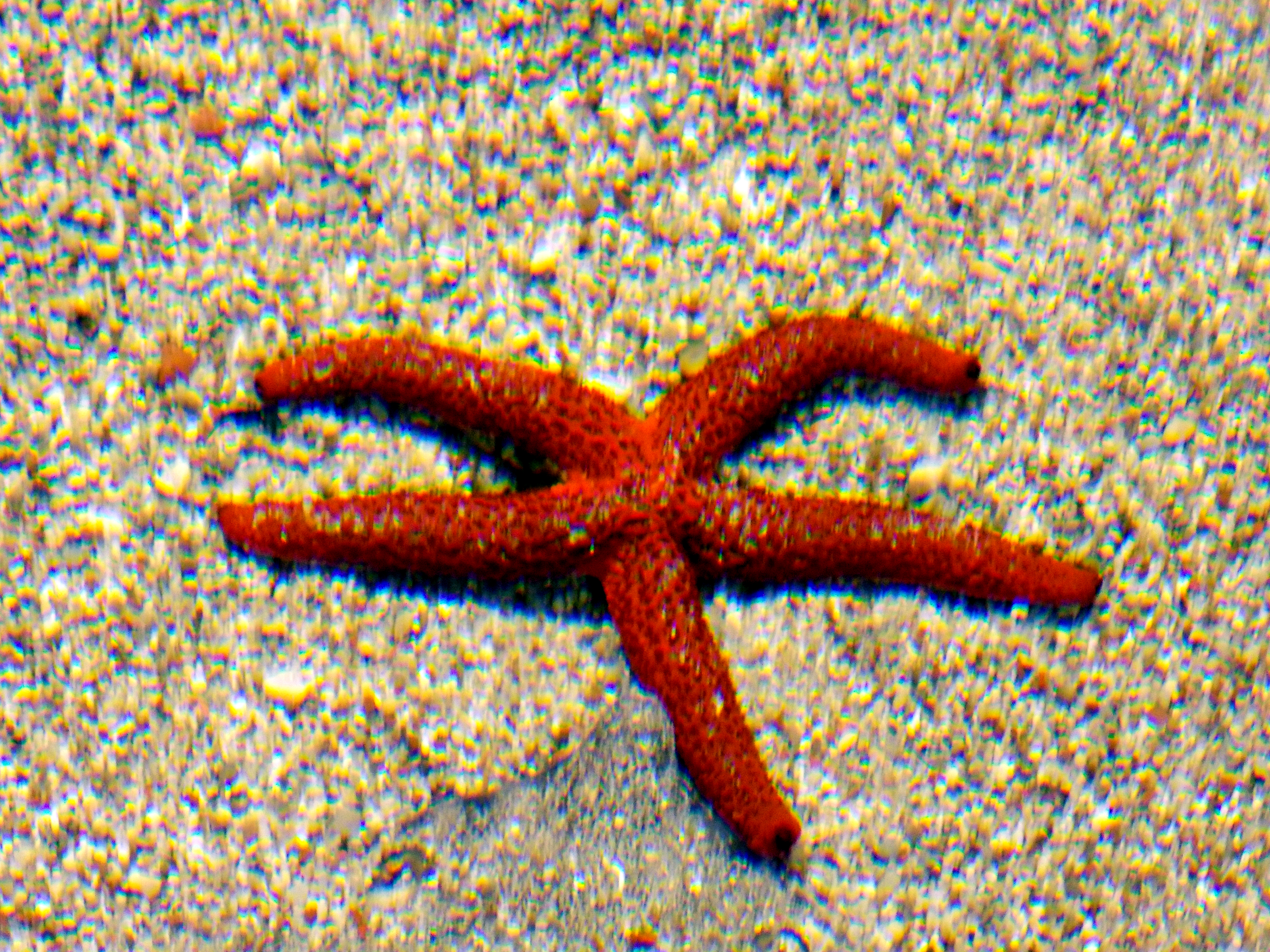

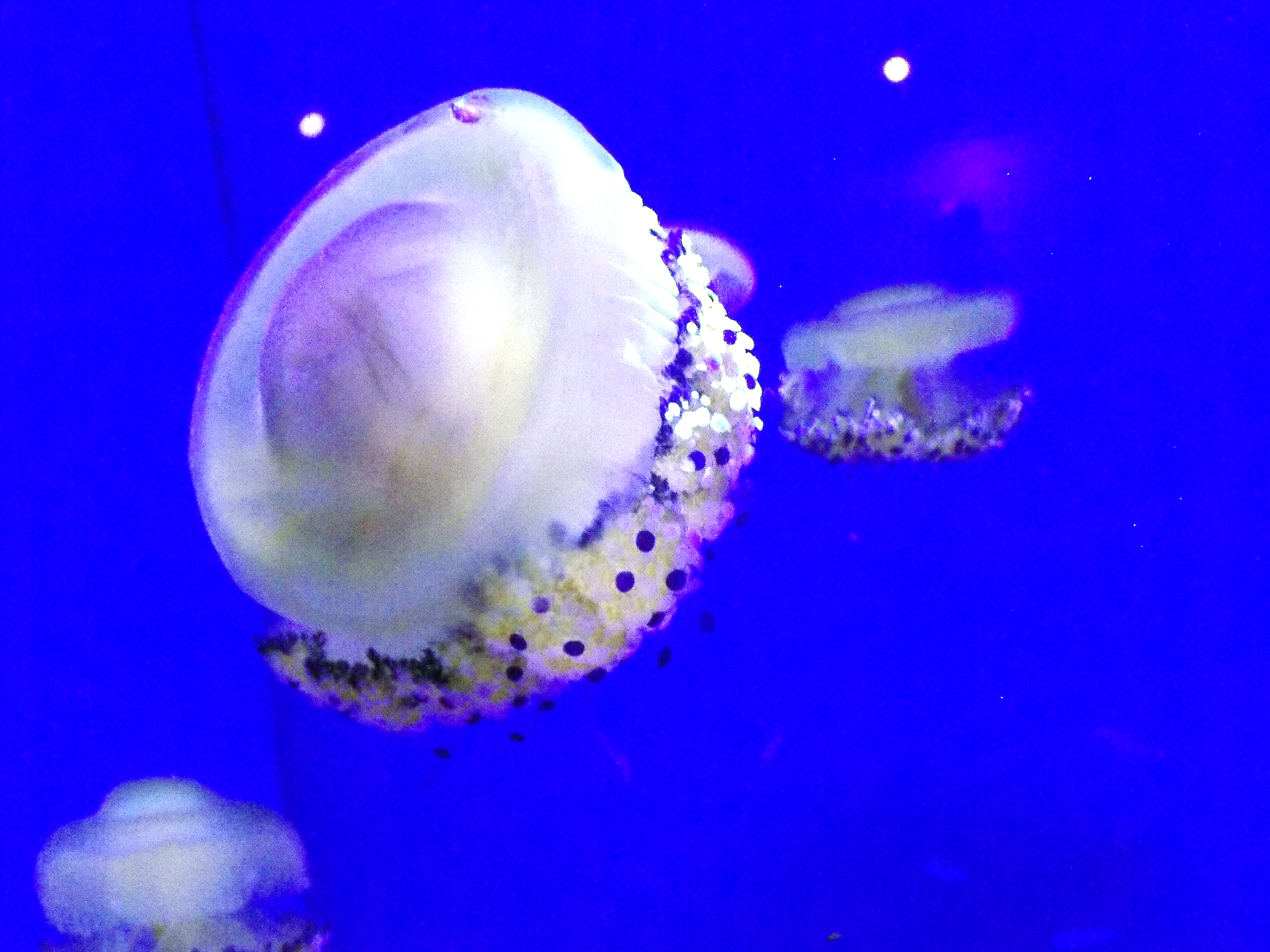

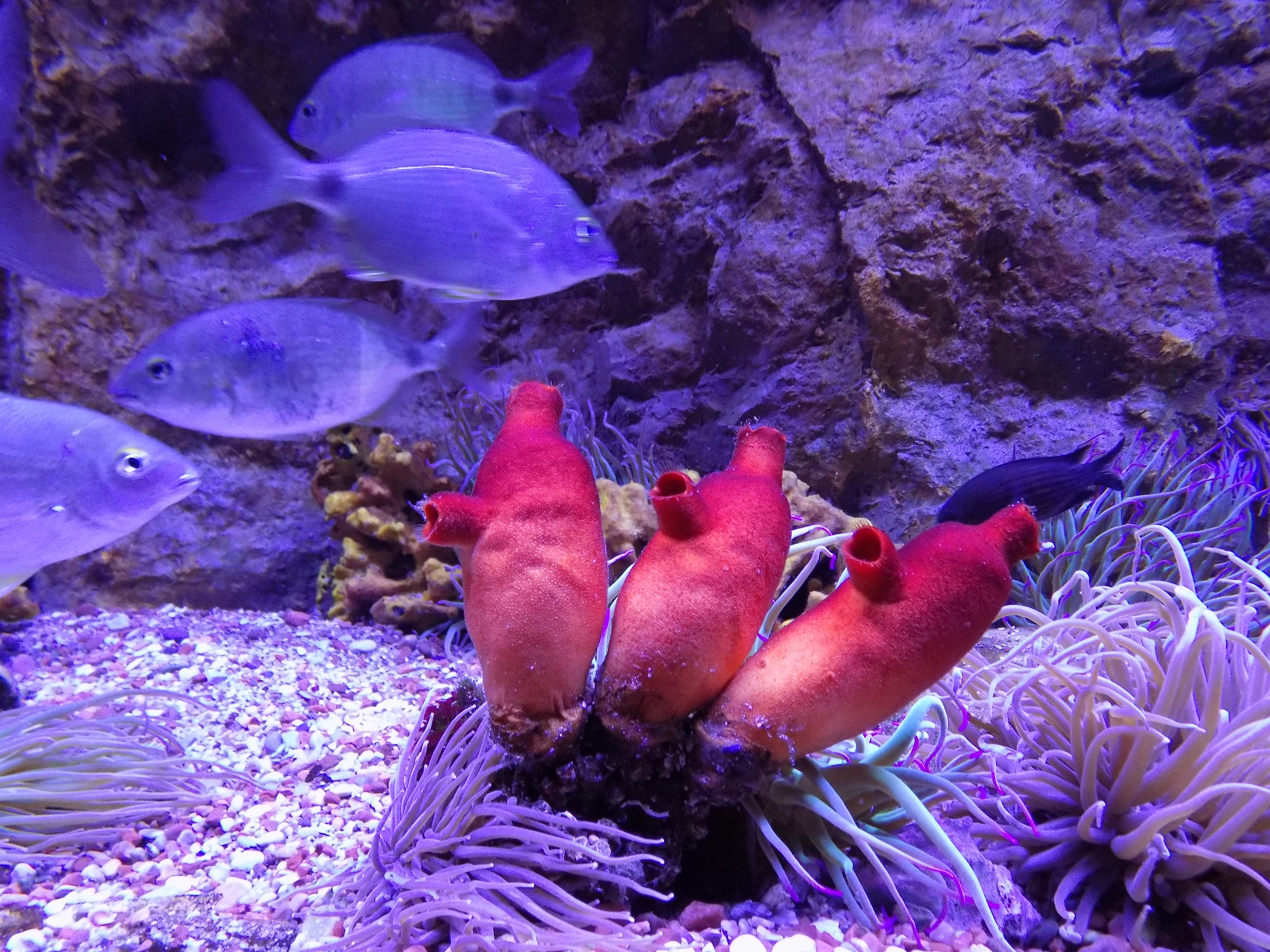

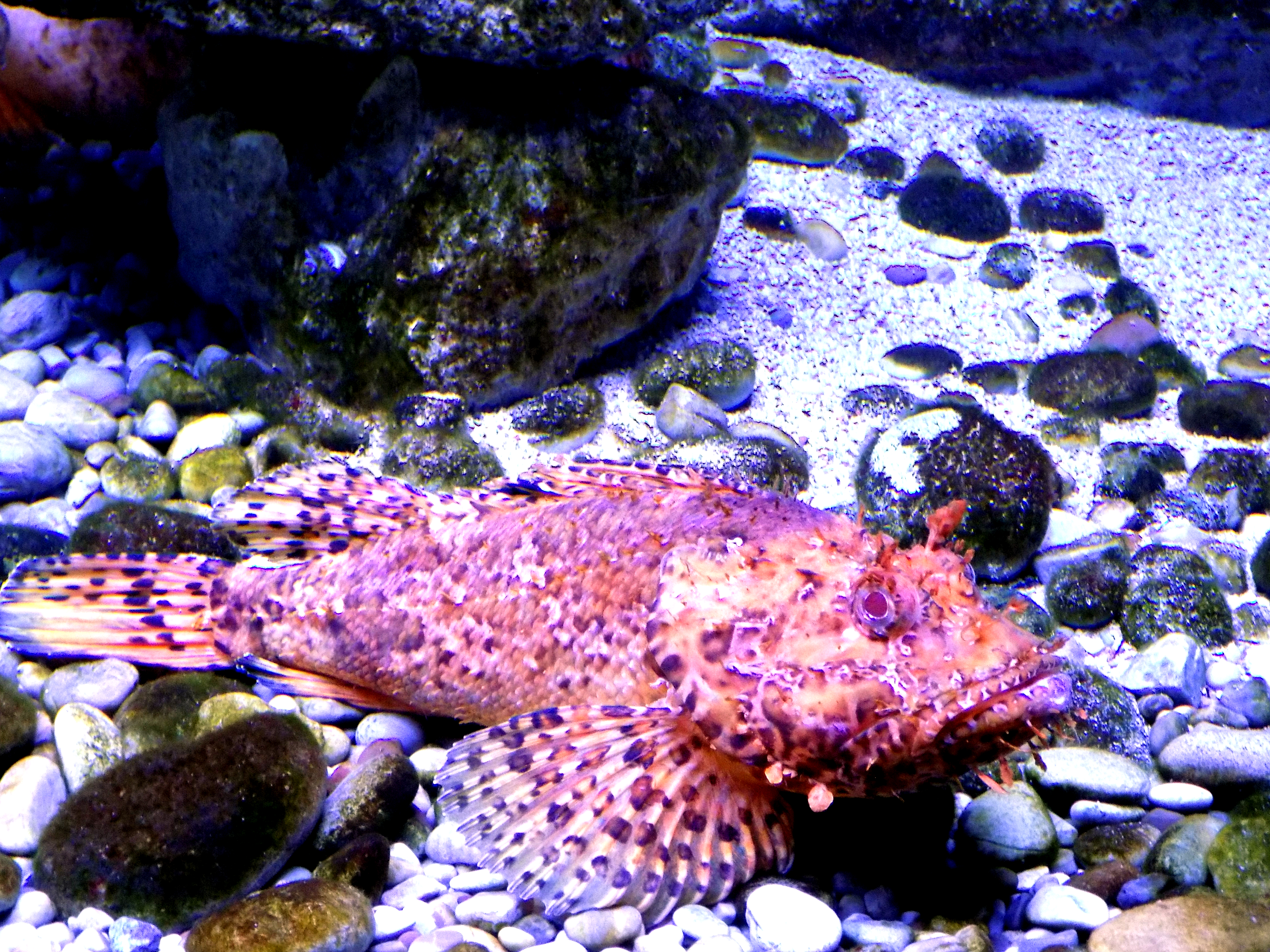

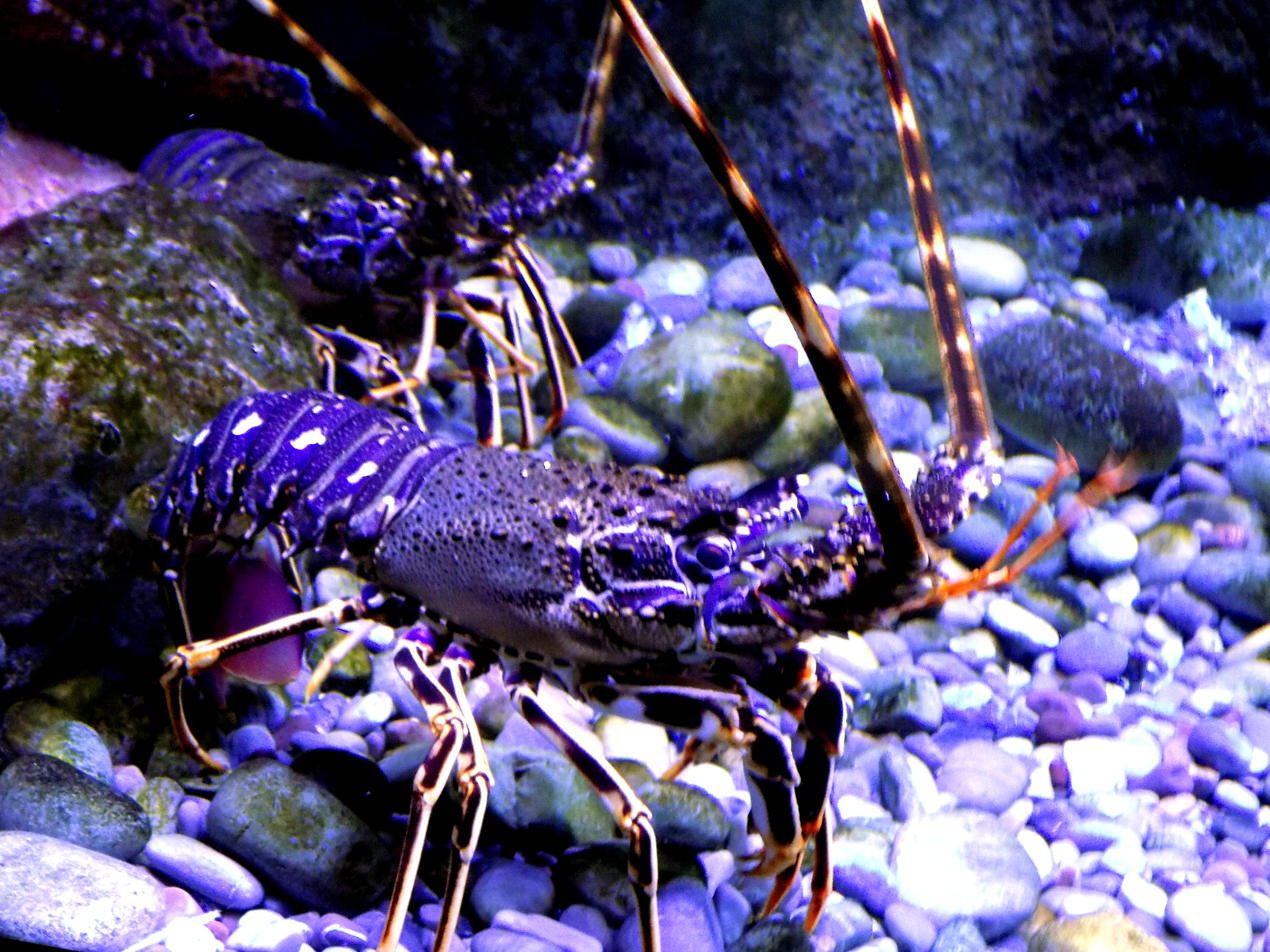

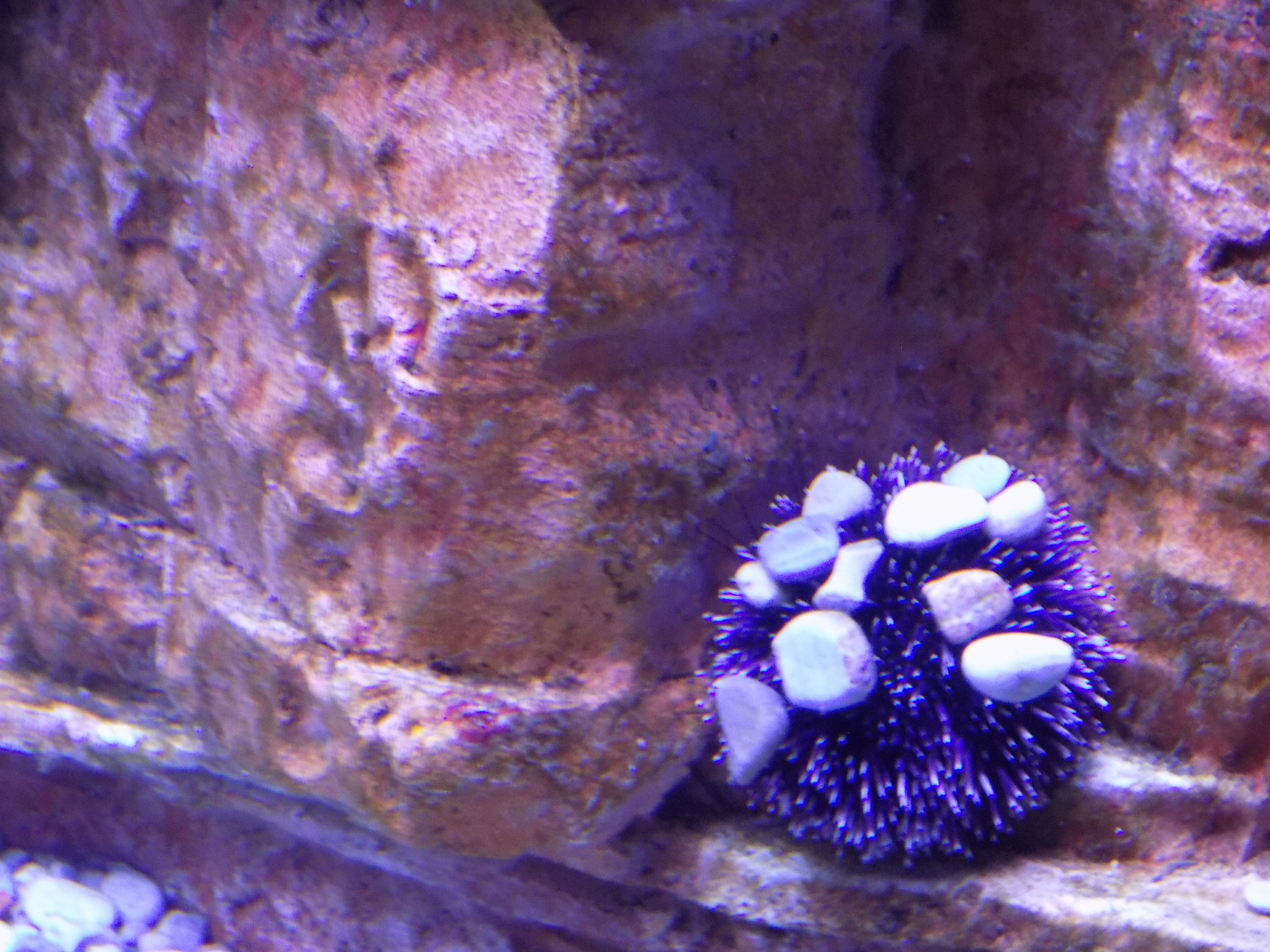

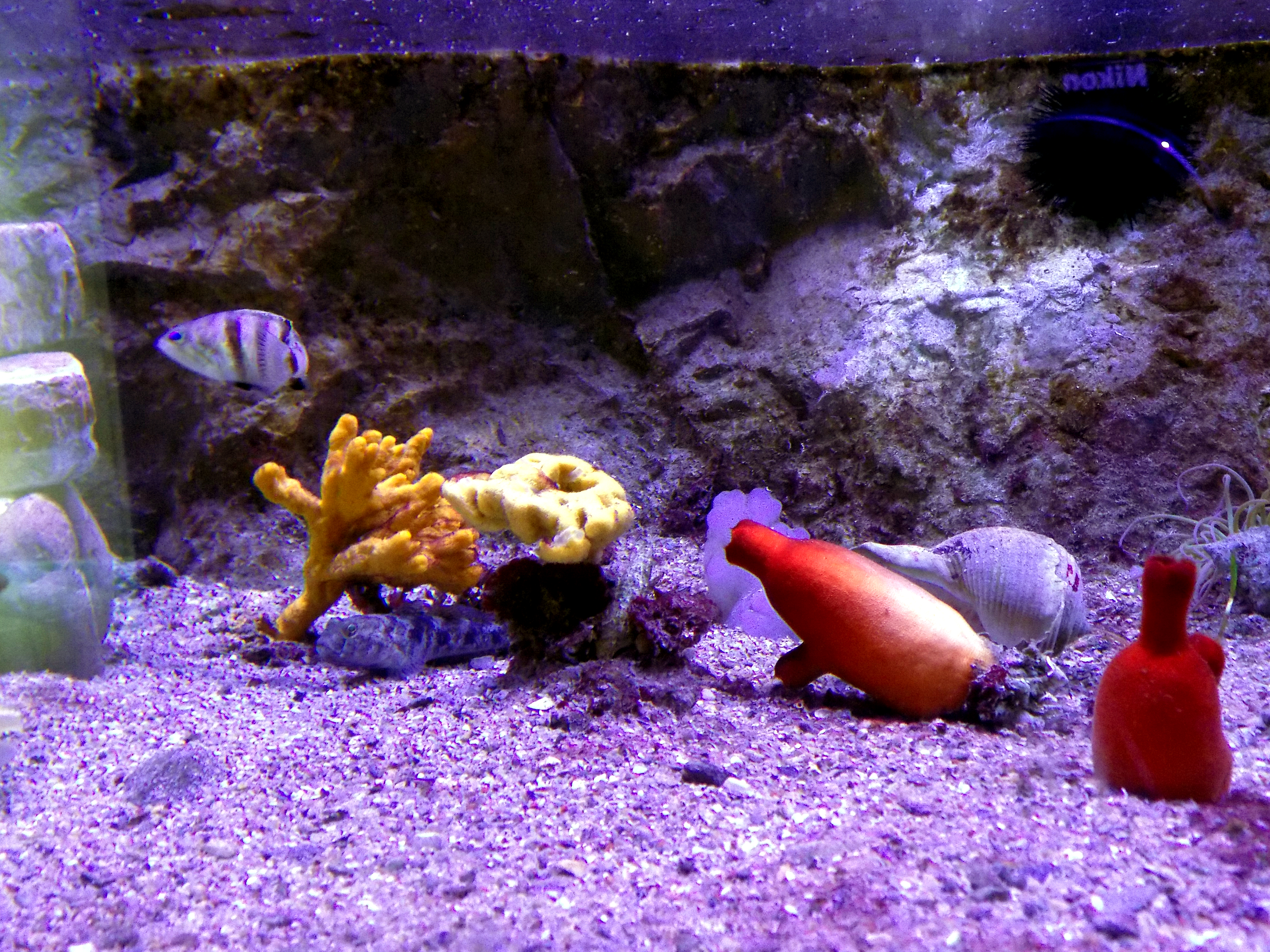

== See also ==
- Aquarium Center Kragujevac

== Sources ==
- Đurović, Mirko; Joksimović, Aleksandar; Laušević, Radoje; Ikica, Zdravko; Pestorić, Branka (February 2021). Organization of the Center for Adriatic Biodiversity Conservation: "Aquarium Boka" in Institute of Marine Biology, Kotor, Montenegro. ResearchGate.
