= Jovan Marković (politician) =

Serbian politician

Jovan Marković (Serbian Cyrillic: Јован Марковић; born 1972) is a politician in Serbia. He was the mayor of Užice from 2008 to 2012 and served in the National Assembly of Serbia from 2014 to 2016. During his time as an elected official, Marković was a member of the Democratic Party (Demokratska stranka, DS).

== Early life and private career ==
Marković was born in Užice, in what was then the Socialist Republic of Serbia in the Socialist Federal Republic of Yugoslavia. He graduated from the University of Niš Faculty of Philosophy in 1996 and received the title of Graduate Pedagogue for Physical Culture. He worked as a teacher and was the director of Užice's kindergarten program from 2001 to 2008. He later received a master's degree from Užice's Faculty of Teacher Education in 2011, with the academic title Master of Didactic and Methodological Sciences.

== Politician ==
Marković joined the DS in 2000. The party contested the 2000 Serbian local elections as part of the Democratic Opposition of Serbia (Demokratska opozicija Srbije, DOS), a broad and ideologically diverse coalition of parties opposed to Slobodan Milošević's administration. Marković ran as the DOS's candidate in Užice's thirteenth division and was defeated. (This was the last local election cycle in Serbia in which members were elected in single-member constituencies. All subsequent local elections have been conducted under proportional representation.)

=== Mayor of Užice ===
Marković became the president of the DS's city board in Užice in 2006. He led the party's electoral list in the 2008 Serbian local elections and was elected when the list won a plurality victory with twenty-eight out of sixty-nine seats. The DS subsequently formed a local administration, and Marković was chosen as mayor. He served in this role for the next four years. In 2009, he signed an agreement with Serbian defence minister Dragan Šutanovac to convert the Ponikve Airport from a military airfield for a civilian-military airport.

He again led the DS list for Užice in the 2012 local elections and was re-elected when the list won twenty-two seats. He was chosen for another term as mayor when the local assembly convened in early July. Subsequent shifts in the city's political alliances led to the rival Serbian Progressive Party (Srpska napredna stranka, SNS) taking power later in the year; Marković was removed as mayor on 29 October 2012 and served as an opposition member of the assembly. In standing down as mayor, he identified the construction of the city's gas pipeline, stadium, and swimming pool as the main accomplishments of his time in office.

=== Parliamentarian and after ===
Marković received the thirteenth position on the DS's list in the 2014 Serbian parliamentary election and was elected to parliament when the list won nineteen mandates. The SNS and its allies won a majority victory and the DS served in opposition. Marković was a member of the assembly committee on the judiciary, public administration, and local self-government; a member of the agriculture, forestry, and water management committee; a member of the committee on spatial planning, transport, infrastructure, and telecommunications; a deputy member of the health and family committee; a member of Serbia's delegation to the Inter-Parliamentary Union; the leader of Serbia's parliamentary friendship group with Israel; and a member of the friendship groups with China, Germany, Greece, Italy, Slovenia, and Switzerland. Shortly after the 2014 election, he supported party leader Dragan Đilas against a challenge from Bojan Pajtić; Pajtić ultimately won the challenge and became the party's new leader.

He was not a candidate for re-election to the national assembly in 2016, although he again appeared in the first position on the DS's coalition list in Užice in the concurrent 2016 local elections. The SNS's list won the local election, and the DS list finished second with fifteen seats. Marković continued to serve as an opposition member for the next term, leading the DS assembly group.

Marković was a vice-president of the DS from 2012 to 2018. He criticized the party's leadership after its poor performance in the 2018 Belgrade City Assembly election, although he said that he would remain a member of the party. The DS boycotted the 2020 elections, and his term in the local assembly came to an end that year.

== Electoral record ==
=== Local (City of Užice) ===
2000 Užice city assembly election: Member for Division 13
Candidate	Party
Jovan Marković	Democratic Opposition of Serbia (Affiliation: Democratic Party)
Novak Milović	Serbian Renewal Movement
Momčilo Nikolić (***WINNER***)	Socialist Party of Serbia–Yugoslav Left
Dragan Stančić	Serbian Radical Party
Total
