= Aleksandra Jerkov =

Serbian politician (born 1982)

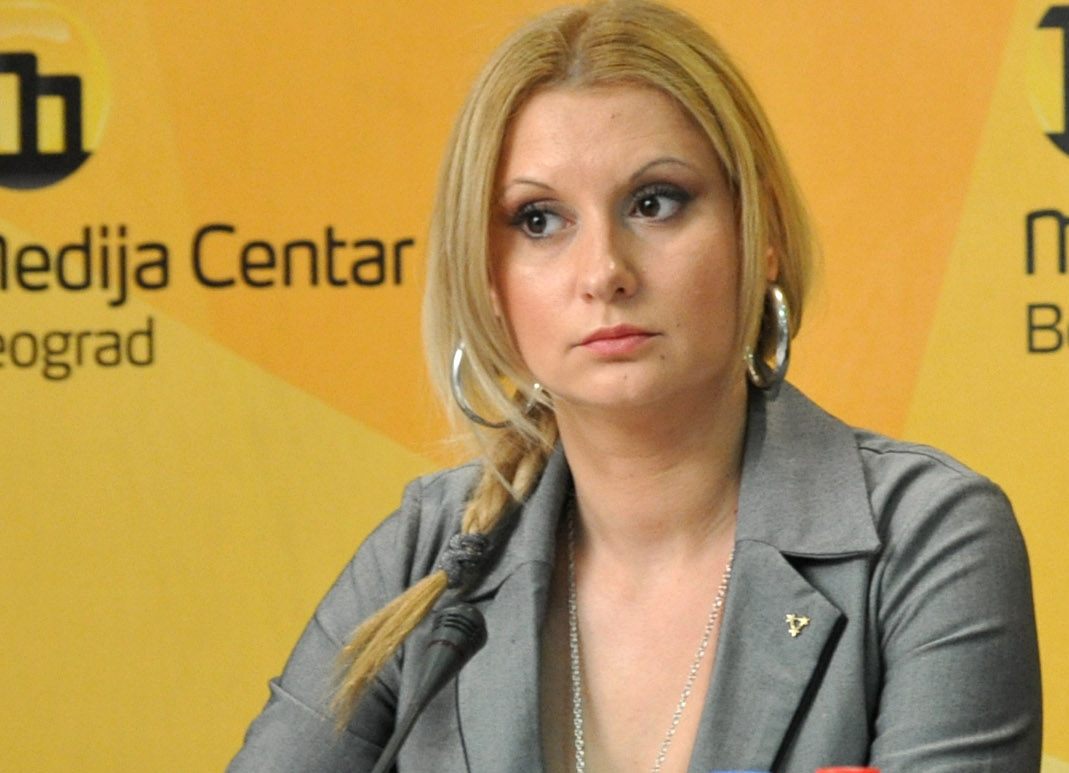

Aleksandra Jerkov (Serbian Cyrillic: Александра Јерков; born September 22, 1982) is a politician in Serbia. She has served in the National Assembly of Serbia on an almost uninterrupted basis since 2007, originally as a member of the League of Social Democrats of Vojvodina (LSV) and since 2014 as a member of the Democratic Party.

== Early life and career ==
Jerkov was born in Novi Sad, Vojvodina, then part of the Socialist Republic of Serbia in the Socialist Federal Republic of Yugoslavia. She received an undergraduate degree from the department of Serbian language and linguistics at the University of Novi Sad and a master's degree in European integration and regionalism from the University of Graz. She joined the LSV in 2000 and was the international secretary of its youth wing from 2003 to 2006, when she became the president of the youth wing and a member of the party presidency.

She was an official spokesperson for the party during the 2006 Serbian constitutional referendum, in which the LSV urged its supporters to abstain from voting. She was quoted as saying, "We find it hard to accept that the new constitution means a clean break with [Slobodan] Milošević's constitution and his way of governance when we know that Ivica Dačić was involved in writing the new constitution and when Tomislav Nikolić campaigned for the referendum."

Jerkov identified Rosa Luxemburg as a role model in a 2011 interview, on the grounds that she "was not afraid to speak her mind and give her life for an idea."

== Parliamentary career ==
=== LSV representative ===
Jerkov first sought election to the National Assembly in the 2003 parliamentary election, receiving the eightieth position on a coalition electoral list led by the LSV. The list did not cross the electoral threshold to win representation in the assembly.

The LSV contested the 2007 parliamentary election in an alliance with the Liberal Democratic Party and other groups. Jerkov received the eighty-fourth position on the alliance's list; the list won fifteen mandates, and Jerkov was subsequently included as part of her party's parliamentary delegation. (From 2000 to 2011, Serbian parliamentary mandates were awarded to sponsoring parties or coalitions rather than to individual candidates, and it was common practice for mandates to be awarded out of numerical order. Jerkov's relatively low position on the list – which was in any event mostly arranged in alphabetical order – did not prevent her from being awarded a mandate.) A vocal opponent of Vojislav Koštunica's government, she called in late 2007 for Vojvodina to have its full autonomy restored and criticized the government's standard responses to criticism on this issue, saying, "when Vojvodina's residents ask where their money has gone, they are immediately accused of being separatists, traitors and drug users."

Jerkov pressed charges against education minister Zoran Lončar in early 2008 for the abuse of minors for political purposes, following the minister's decision to close schools on the day of a giant "Kosovo is Serbia" rally. She also pressed charges against Slobodan Samardžić, the minister for Kosovo and Metohija, for inciting destructive activities by saying that the demolition of control points on an administrative line with Kosovo was a legitimate citizens' action.

The LSV contested the 2008 Serbian parliamentary election as part of the For a European Serbia list led by the Democratic Party. Jerkov received the fifty-sixth position on the list and was once again selected as part of the LSV's parliamentary team after the list won 102 mandates. For a European Serbia subsequently became the dominant force in a coalition government led by Mirko Cvetković, and Jerkov was chosen as the parliamentary group's deputy whip. In early 2009, she indicated her party's support for a comprehensive anti-discrimination bill and urged the government not to weaken its provisions in response to criticism from religious groups. She later opposed a 2011 law permitting compensation or restitution of property seized by Yugoslavia's communist government between 1945 and 1968, arguing that it "offer[ed] too broad grounds for who can be rehabilitated and thereby gain the right to restitution."

In April 2012, Jerkov proposed on behalf of the LSV that a new parliamentary oath require members to pledge their property as well as their honour or be held financially accountable for professional misconduct. The suggestion was not taken up by other parties.

Serbia's electoral system was reformed in 2011, such that parliamentary mandates were awarded in numerical order to candidates on successful lists. The LSV contested the 2012 parliamentary election with the Democratic Party's Choice for a Better Life list; Jerkov received the twenty-eighth position on the list and was re-elected when the list won sixty-seven mandates. Both the Democratic Party and the LSV moved into opposition in the Serbian assembly following this election; neither, as of 2017, has returned to participation in government.

Jerkov was also involved in municipal and provincial government during this period. She led the LSV's municipal electoral slate for Novi Sad in the 2012 municipal elections, and, while not successful in her bid for mayor, she was selected as speaker of the municipal assembly in July 2012 after the LSV and Democratic Party formed a local alliance with the Socialist Party of Serbia. Her tenure proved to be short; she was replaced in September 2012 following a shift in local alliances and the defection of the Socialist Party. She was also elected to the Assembly of Vojvodina in the 2012 provincial elections after receiving the third position on the LSV's list and served in the assembly from June 22 to September 20, 2012.

=== Democratic Party representative ===
Jerkov left the LSV in January 2013 to join the Democratic Party. She resigned her parliamentary mandate in so doing (formally standing down from the assembly on January 11, 2013), and also resigned her seat in the Novi Sad municipal assembly. She joined the Democratic Party's presidency shortly thereafter and became an official spokesperson for the party, later heading its information service. During this period, she was also a spokesperson for Vojvodina government leader Bojan Pajtić.

Jerkov received the twenty-first position on the Democratic Party's coalition list for the 2014 Serbian parliamentary election. The party had been weakened by internal splits by this time, and the list won only nineteen seats. Jerkov was not immediately re-elected, although she was able to enter the assembly on April 26, 2014, as a replacement for an elected member who resigned. She subsequently led a parliamentary committee that reviewed allegations that internal affairs minister Nebojša Stefanović had plagiarized parts of his Ph.D. thesis.

She received the twelfth position on the Democratic Party's list for the 2016 election and was re-elected when the list won sixteen seats. Jerkov is currently a member of the parliamentary committee on education, science, technological development, and the information society; a deputy member of three other committees; a member of Serbia's delegation to the Inter-Parliamentary Union Assembly; and a member of the parliamentary friendship groups with Austria, Belgium, Cuba, Denmark, France, Germany, Israel, Italy, Japan, Norway, Spain, Sweden, the United Kingdom, and the United States of America.

== Personal life ==
She is married to politician Balša Božović. They have one child together.
