= Balša Božović =

Balša Božović may refer to:

- Balša Božović (politician)
- Balša Božović (footballer)
