= Milovan Danojlić =

Serbian poet (1937–2022)

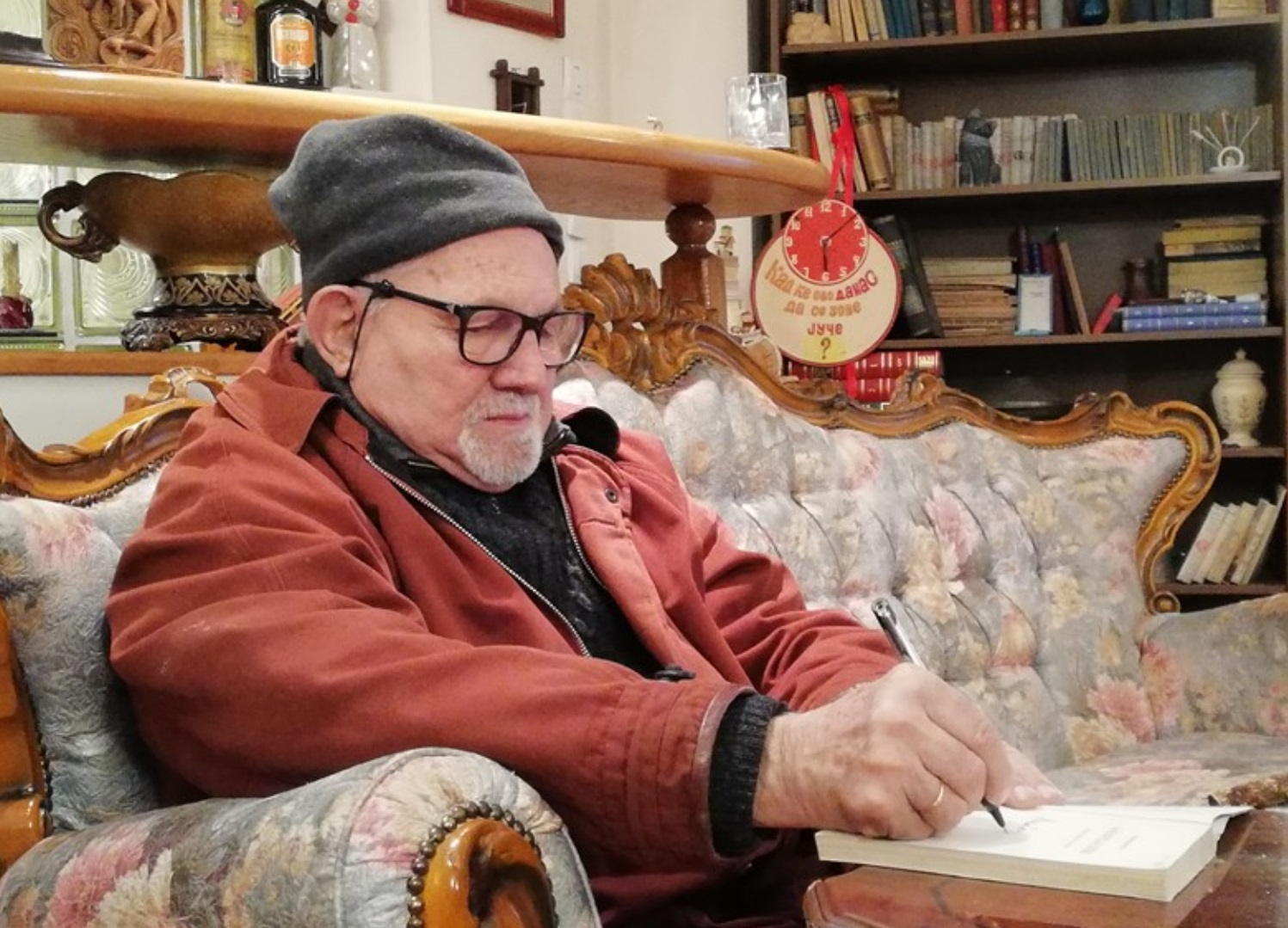
- Danojlić in 2018
- Born: 3 July 1937; Ivanovci, Kingdom of Yugoslavia
- Died: 23 November 2022 (aged 85); Poitiers, France
- Education: University of Belgrade Faculty of Philology
- Writing career
- Period: 1957–2022
- Genre: Poetry

Milovan Danojlić (Serbian Cyrillic: Милован Данојлић; 3 July 1937 – 23 November 2022) was a Serbian poet, essayist and literary critic best known for his children's poetry. Danojlić was a full member of the Serbian Academy of Science and Arts.

== Biography ==
Danojlić published his first poems in 1954, while his first independent book "Urođenički psalmi" was published in 1957. He was a lecturer on the Serbo-Croatian language at the University of Poitiers from 1977 to 1978.

Danojlić was a selected artist of the Fulbright program Artist-in-residence at the UMass Amherst from 1980 to 1981.

In 1982, he was a founding member of the Committee for the Protection of Artistic Freedom (Odbor za zaštitu umetničke slobode), together with Biljana Jovanović, Dragoslav Mihailović and others. Since 1984, he alternately lived as a freelance writer in Paris and Belgrade, and worked as occasional freelance associate at Radio France. In 1989, he was a member of the Founding Committee of the Democratic Party (together with his writer colleagues Borislav Pekić, Gojko Đogo and Dušan Vukajlović), which was the first Yugoslav opposition and non-communist party since 1945.

Danojlić published more than 70 books of fiction and poetry in the Serbian language. His most famous books are: Neka vrsta cirkusa (Some kind of circus); Lične stvari - ogledi o sebi i o drugima (Personal things - reflections on yourself and others) and Balada o siromaštvu (Balad on poverty).

He received numerous awards, including: Zmajeva Award (1976), Isidora Sekulć Award (1979), Disova Award (1995), NIN Award (1997), Desanka Maksimović Prize (1999).

Danojlić was a member of the Serbian Academy of Sciences and Arts from 2000, and president of the Serbian Literary Guild since 2013.

Milovan Danojlić was married to Sanja Bošković and was the father of two sons (born 1992 and 1993).

He died in Paris on 23 November 2022, at the age of 85.

== Works ==
- Urođenički psalmi, Nolit, Belgrade, 1957
- Nedelja, Lykos, Zagreb, 1959
- Kako spavaju tramvaji, Lykos, Zagreb, 1959
- Noćno proleće, Progres, Novi Sad, 1960
- Balade, Nolit, Belgrade, 1966
- Lirske rasprave, Matica srpska, Novi Sad, 1967
- Furunica-jogunica, Kulturni centar, Novi Sad, 1969
- Glasovi, nezavisno izdanje, Belgrade, 1970
- Čudnovat dan, Mlado pokolenje, Belgrade, 1971
- O ranom ustajanju, Matica srpska, Novi Sad, 1972
- Rodna godina, BIGZ, Belgrade, 1972
- Onde potok, onde cvet, Zmajeve dečje igre/Radnički univerzitet, Novi Sad, 1973
- Čistine, Matica srpska, Novi Sad, 1973
- Grk u zatvoru, August Cesarec, Zagreb, 1975
- Naivna pesma, Nolit, Belgrade, 1976
- Put i sjaj, Matica srpska, Novi Sad, 1976
- Kako je Dobrislav protrčao kroz Jugoslaviju, BIGZ, Belgrade, 1977
- Muka s rečima, Slobodan Mašić, Belgrade, 1977
- Pesme, Nolit, Belgrade, 1978
- Tačka otpora, Liber, Zagreb, 1978
- Zimovnik, Zbirka Biškupić, Zagreb, 1979
- Zmijin svlak, Nolit, Belgrade, 1979
- Rane i nove pesme, Prosveta, Belgrade, 1979
- Kako živi poljski miš, Narodna knjiga, Belgrade, 1980
- Senke oko kuće, Znanje, Zagreb, 1980
- To : vežbe iz upornog posmatranja, Prosveta, Belgrade, 1980
- Srećan život, Mladost, Zagreb, 1981
- Mišja rupa, M. Danojlić/M. Josić, Belgrade, 1982
- Sunce je počelo da se zlati, Zavod za izdavanje udžbenika, Novi Sad, 1982
- Čišćenje alata, M. Danojlić/S. Mašić, Belgrade, 1982
- Brisani prostor, Srpska književna zadruga, Belgrade, 1984
- Podguznica, M.Josić/M. Danojlić, Belgrade, 1984
- Šta sunce večera, Rad, Belgrade, 1984
- Kao divlja zver : teškoće s ljudima i sa stvarima, Filip Višnjić, Belgrade, 1985
- Večiti nailazak : stihovi, Jugoslavika, Toronto, 1986
- Dragi moj Petroviću, Znanje, Zagreb, 1986
- Čekajući da stane pljusak, [s.n.], Paris, 1986
- Pisati pod nadzorom, Nova Jugoslavija, Vranje, 1987
- Neka vrsta cirkusa, Književna omladina Srbije, Belgrade, 1989
- Zlo i naopako, BIGZ, Belgrade, 1991
- Godina prolazi kroz avliju, Srpska književna zadruga, Belgrade, 1992
- Pesme za vrlo pametnu decu, Prosveta, Belgrade, 1994
- Da mi je znati : izbor iz poezije za decu, Zmaj, Novi Sad, 1995
- Na obali, Gradska biblioteka, Čačak, 1995
- Mesto rođenja, Filip Višnjić, Belgrade, 1996
- Muka duhu, Draganić, Belgrade, 1996
- Teško buđenje, Plato, Belgrade, 1996
- Šta čovek da radi, Obrazovanje, Novi Sad, 1996
- Jesen na pijaci, Školska knjiga, Novi Sad, 1997
- Nedelja u našoj ulici, Todor, Novi Sad, 1997
- Oslobodioci i izdajnici, Filip Višnjić, Belgrade, 1997
- Balada o siromaštvu, Filip Višnjić, Belgrade, 1999
- Veliki ispit, Verzal Press, Belgrade, 1999
- Kako je kralj Koba Jagi napustio presto, Intelekta, Valjevo, 2000
- Pevanija za decu, Dečje novine, Gornji Milanovac, 2000
- Lične stvari : ogledi o sebi i drugima, Plato, Belgrade, 2001
- Ograda na kraju Beograda, Bookland, Belgrade, 2001
- Pustolovina ili Ispovest u dva glasa, Filip Višnjić, Belgrade, 2002
- Zečji tragovi, Filip Višnjić, Belgrade, 2004
- Srbija na zapadu, NB "Stefan Prvovenčani", Kraljevo, 2005
- Čovek čoveku, Književna zajednica "Borisav Stanković", Vranje, 2006
- Pešački monolog, Plato, Belgrade, 2007
- Učenje jezika, Srpska književna zadruga, Belgrade, 2008
- Priča o pripovedaču, IP Matica srpska, Novi Sad, 2009
- Crno ispod noktiju, Plato, Belgrade, 2010
- Dobro jeste živeti, Albatros Plus, Belgrade, 2010
- Iznuđene ispovesti, Plato, Belgrade, 2010
- Pisma bez adrese, Službeni glasnik, Belgrade, 2012
- Hrana za ptice, Albatros Plus, Belgrade, 2014
