= Mala biblioteka =

Mala biblioteka (translates as Wee library or Little library) is an Internet-based project in Serbian (also Serbo-Croat or Croatian language), developing interactive formats of literature for speakers of Serbo-Croat across the world. Its primary users are younger population of speakers of the Serbian or Croatian language and all local variants living in diaspora, as well as in all the ex-Yugoslav republics.

The Mala biblioteka development was initiated in 2007 by a London (UK) team of developers, and opened officially in May 2010.

The project cooperates closely with the authors in developing interactive formats of electronic books, including elements such as authors own reading of books or poems.

In its first edition the project published over two hundred interactive materials, including language games, picture books, electronic books, audio books and theatre plays, all available in electronic interactive formats, including online.

== Authors ==
The editions included the notable authors and creators for children and young people, such as:

Milovan Danojlić: Kako spavaju tramvaji i Rodna godina (collection of poems for children and adults, read by the author).
Ljubivoje Ršumović: Još nam samo ale fale, Vesti iz nesvesti, Ma šta mi reče (collections of poetry for children, read by the author).
Mošo Odalović: Mama je glagol od glagola raditi, Šta tražiš u vasioni.
Mirjana Bulatović: Sanjao sam da mi gori škola (read by the author).
Dadov - Experimental theatre for young, Belgrade.
Lutkarsko pozorište Pinokio - Puppet theatre Pinokio, Belgrade.
Duško Radović i Duško Petričić: Nikola Tesla priča o djetinjstvu.

== Bibliography ==
Kako spavaju tramvaji, Milovan Danojlić, (2010), Mala biblioteka.
Rodna godina, Milovan Danojlić, (2010), Mala biblioteka.
Još nam samo ale fale, Ljubivoje Ršumović, (2010), Mala biblioteka.
Vesti iz nesvesti, Ljubivoje Ršumović, (2010), Mala biblioteka.
Ma šta mi reče, Ljubivoje Ršumović, (2010), Mala biblioteka.
Mama je glagol od glagola raditi, Mošo Odalović, (2010), Mala biblioteka.
Šta tražiš u vasioni, Mošo Odalović, (2010), Mala biblioteka.
Sanjao sam da mi gori škola, Mirjana Bulatović, (2010), Mala biblioteka.
Plavi čuperak, Miroslav Antić, (2010), Mala biblioteka.
Garavi sokak, Miroslav Antić, (2010), Mala biblioteka
Nikola Tesla priča o djetinjstvu, Dušan Petričić, Dušan Radović, (2010), Mala biblioteka.
Mali princ, Antoan de-Sant Egziperi, (2010), Mala biblioteka.
Marko Kraljevic, Epske pesme, (2010), Mala biblioteka.

== References and links ==
Danas: Glas i pesme Miroslava Antića na internetu
Danas: Antologijske knjige koje se kupuju klikerima
Vreme: Mala biblioteka sa velikim ciljem
B92: Mala biblioteka otvorila vrata.
