= Slobodan Inić =

Yugoslav academic and political commentator

Slobodan Inić (born 1946 in Zrenjanin, Serbia, DF Yugoslavia - died June 22, 2000) was a political commentator and professor of sociology at the University of Belgrade. He was one of the founders of the Democratic Party in Serbia, Yugoslavia in December 1989.

His published books include "Portreti".
