= Democratic Party (Serbia) =

Political party in Serbia

Democratic Party Демократска странка
- Abbreviation: DS
- President: Srđan Milivojević
- Deputy President: Dragana Rakić
- Vice-Presidents: Nenad Mitrović; Nebojša Novaković; Branimir Jovančićević; Tijana Blagojević
- Parliamentary leader: Srđan Milivojević
- Founder: The Founding Committee of the Democratic Party
- Founded: 3 February 1990; 36 years ago
- Registered: 27 July 1990; 36 years ago
- Headquarters: Nušićeva 6/II, Belgrade
- Newspaper: Bedem
- Youth wing: Democratic Youth
- Women's wing: Women's Forum
- Ideology: Social democracy; Pro-Europeanism
- Political position: Centre-left
- European affiliation: Party of European Socialists (associate)
- International affiliation: Progressive Alliance; Socialist International
- Parliamentary group: Democratic Party
- Colours: Yellow; Blue
- National Assembly: 0 / 250
- Assembly of Vojvodina: 4 / 120
- City Assembly of Belgrade: 2 / 110

Party flag

Website
- ds.org.rs

The Democratic Party (Serbian: Демократска странка, romanised: Demokratska stranka;, abbr. DS) is a social democratic political party in Serbia. Srđan Milivojević has led the party as its president since 2024. The party is colloquially known as the žuti (yellows) because of one of its main colours.

DS was founded in 1990 by a group of intellectuals who sought to revive the Democratic Party, which was active in the Kingdom of Yugoslavia. Dragoljub Mićunović was the first president of DS until 1994 and under his leadership DS gained representation in the National Assembly of Serbia and took part in anti-government protests against Slobodan Milošević. After Zoran Đinđić's election as president of DS in 1994, DS was reorganised. Đinđić led the party into the Together coalition, and DS took part in the 1996–1997 protests that occurred after the Electoral Commission invalidated local election results in cities in which the Together coalition had won. DS later led the Alliance for Change, which became part of the Democratic Opposition of Serbia (DOS) in January 2000. DOS won the 2000 Yugoslav general election, but Milošević, the president of the Federal Republic of Yugoslavia and president of the Socialist Party of Serbia (SPS), declined to accept the results of the presidential election, in which the DOS candidate was shown to be placed first, culminating in his overthrow.

DS assumed power in Serbia after winning parliamentary elections in December 2000 and Đinđić then became prime minister. Đinđić was assassinated in March 2003 and succeeded by Boris Tadić as president of DS. Tadić also became president of Serbia while DS was in opposition from 2004 to 2007, when it became part of a coalition government led by DSS. Tadić led DS to victory in 2008 when a coalition government with SPS was formalised. DS was defeated by the Serbian Progressive Party in 2012 and went into opposition. Dragan Đilas became the president of DS in December 2012; he was ousted as mayor of Belgrade in 2013 but survived an internal motion of no confidence in January 2014. He was succeeded by Bojan Pajtić in May 2014. Dragan Šutanovac became the president of DS after Pajtić's resignation in 2016. Šutanovac was then succeeded by Zoran Lutovac in 2018. Lutovac led DS into several opposition coalitions and boycotted the 2020 parliamentary election, causing a schism in the party. He successfully led DS back into the National Assembly in the 2022 election. Milivojević succeeded him as leader in late 2024.

DS was a catch-all party in its early years, occupying the centrist and centre-right positions. It supported the establishment of a market economy, denationalisation, and union rights. DS shifted to a centrist and socially liberal profile under Tadić and became the leading party of the pro-European bloc of Serbian politics. It shifted towards social democracy in 2013, and is now positioned on the centre-left on the political spectrum. Its supporters tend to be female, high school or university educated, tolerant towards diversity, socially progressive, and opposed to authoritarianism and nationalism. DS is an associate member of the Party of European Socialists and a member of the Progressive Alliance and Socialist International.

== History ==
=== Formation ===
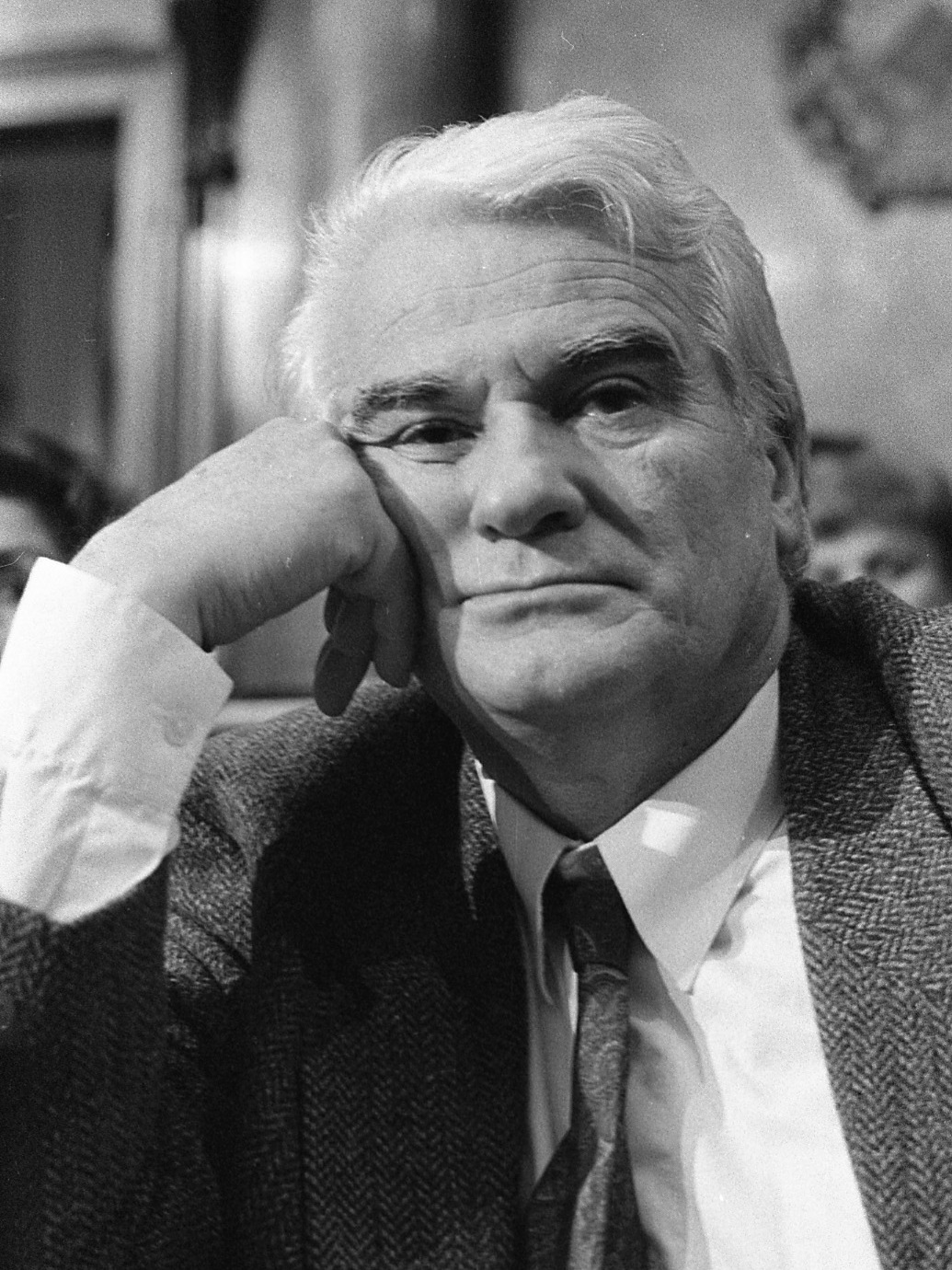
Dragoljub Mićunović served as the first president of DS, from 1990 to 1994

On 11 December 1989, a group of intellectuals—including anti-communist dissidents, liberal academics, poets, writers, and film and theatre directors—held a press conference announcing the revival of the Democratic Party (DS), at which they also released a written proclamation. DS had existed in the Kingdom of Yugoslavia until 1945, when the Communist Party of Yugoslavia, later known as League of Communists of Yugoslavia (SKJ), came to power; as such, DS claims that it was "re-founded" (obnovljena), instead of categorising itself as a new political party. The original thirteen signatories of the proclamation of the Founding Committee included Kosta Čavoški, Milovan Danojlić, Zoran Đinđić, Gojko Đogo, Vladimir Gligorov, Slobodan Inić, Marko Janković, Vojislav Koštunica, Dragoljub Mićunović, Borislav Pekić, Miodrag Perišić, Radoslav Stojanović, and Dušan Vukajlović. Their programmatic proclamation, named Letter of Intents (Pismo o namerama), attracted even more intellectuals who eventually joined DS.

In 1989, the Socialist Federal Republic of Yugoslavia was still a one-party state; DS thus became the first opposition, non-communist party in Yugoslavia. With the disintegration of the SKJ that began in January 1990, its constituent republics, later including Serbia in July 1990, adopted multi-party systems. DS organised its founding assembly on 3 February 1990 at the Belgrade Youth Center. The first presidency of the DS was contested between Čavoški and Mićunović, with the latter ultimately winning the position. Ideological differences between the two existed; Čavoški wanted the party to adopt a more nationalist and anti-communist rhetoric, while Mićunović was viewed as a liberal. Although Čavoški lost in the leadership election, he was elected president of the party's executive board; Pekić became the deputy president of the DS.

According to Mićunović, Čavoški initially registered the party in Tuzla, Bosnia and Herzegovina, in March 1990 because Serbia had not yet adopted a law authorising a multi-party system. DS was later registered in Serbia on 27 July 1990.

=== 1990–1993: the Mićunović years ===
After its establishment, the DS began publishing its newspaper, Demokratija (English: Democracy), and it also established the Democratic Youth, its youth wing. Gligorov and Inić, who worked on the economic programme of the party, left DS also shortly after its formation due to ideological disagreements. At its second assembly in September 1990, Mićunović was re-elected president of DS while Koštunica and Desimir Tošić were elected vice-presidents. A month later, DS announced that it would take part in the 1990 Serbian parliamentary election. This decision was opposed by Čavoški and Nikola Milošević, who advocated for an election boycott instead. Čavoški previously proposed that opposition parties should receive television air time, representation on electoral bodies, and for the campaign to last 90 days in total. Čavoški and Milošević left DS shortly before the December 1990 election, claiming that fair electoral conditions had not been created. They then formed the Serbian Liberal Party (SLS) in January 1991. Đinđić succeeded Čavoški as the president of the party's executive board. Despite winning 7% of the popular vote in the 1990 election, DS only won 7 seats in the National Assembly due to Serbia's new first-past-the-post electoral system, which favoured the Socialist Party of Serbia (SPS), the then-ruling and largest party of Serbia.

Together with the Serbian Renewal Movement (SPO), DS organised mass protests in Belgrade in March 1991, demanding reforms of the Radio Television of Serbia (RTS). As a result of the protests, SPO leader Vuk Drašković was briefly imprisoned but later let go, and the RTS director resigned. After the break-up of Yugoslavia in early 1992, Serbia became a part of the Federal Republic of Yugoslavia. DS boycotted the May 1992 federal parliamentary elections and declined to accept the results, claiming that free and fair conditions had not been created for the election. Instead of campaigning, DS preferred to organise anti-government protests to force the government to call new fair elections. In June 1992, DS decided not to join the Democratic Movement of Serbia (DEPOS) coalition that had been created a month earlier. Koštunica led the "DS for DEPOS" faction that was in favour of joining DEPOS. He left the party after DS decided not to join the coalition, claiming that Mićunović and Đinđić were in a "secret alliance" with SPS. After leaving DS, he partnered with Mirko Petrović, Draško Petrović, and Vladan Batić and formed the Democratic Party of Serbia (DSS).

After the mass protests, another federal parliamentary election was organised for December 1992. DS decided to take part in this election and it won 6% of the popular vote and 5 seats in the Federal Assembly. DS then joined the government led by Milan Panić, the then-incumbent prime minister of FR Yugoslavia. Simultaneously, in December 1992, general elections were organised in Serbia as a result of an October 1992 early elections referendum. Although DS opposed the referendum, it participated in the election, winning 6 seats. In the presidential election, DS supported Panić, who placed second behind Slobodan Milošević, the leader of SPS and president of Serbia.

In 1993, Đinđić asserted himself in the party and led its operations going into the 1993 parliamentary election. Milošević ended his coalition with the Serbian Radical Party (SRS) in mid-1993 and turned towards DS for negotiations instead. Mićunović claimed that there was a meeting between Milošević and DS, although Zoran Živković has denied that claim. Đinđić invited several entrepreneurs to join DS during this period, which resulted in DS being dubbed the "yellow company" (žuta kompanija) from its opponents. Yellow was both an official colour of DS and the colour of Centromarket, a company owned by Slobodan Radulović, one of the entrepreneurs invited to join the party. Shortly before the 1993 election, DS agreed that Đinđić should be their ballot representative. He led DS under the "Honestly" (Pošteno) banner and visited over 100 locations in Serbia during the campaign period. Đinđić also said that he would retire from politics if DS won less than 20 seats. The campaign was successful: DS won 29 seats in the National Assembly. DS remained in opposition after the election as Đinđić was unable to bring DS into the SPS-led government.

=== 1994–2000: the Đinđić years ===
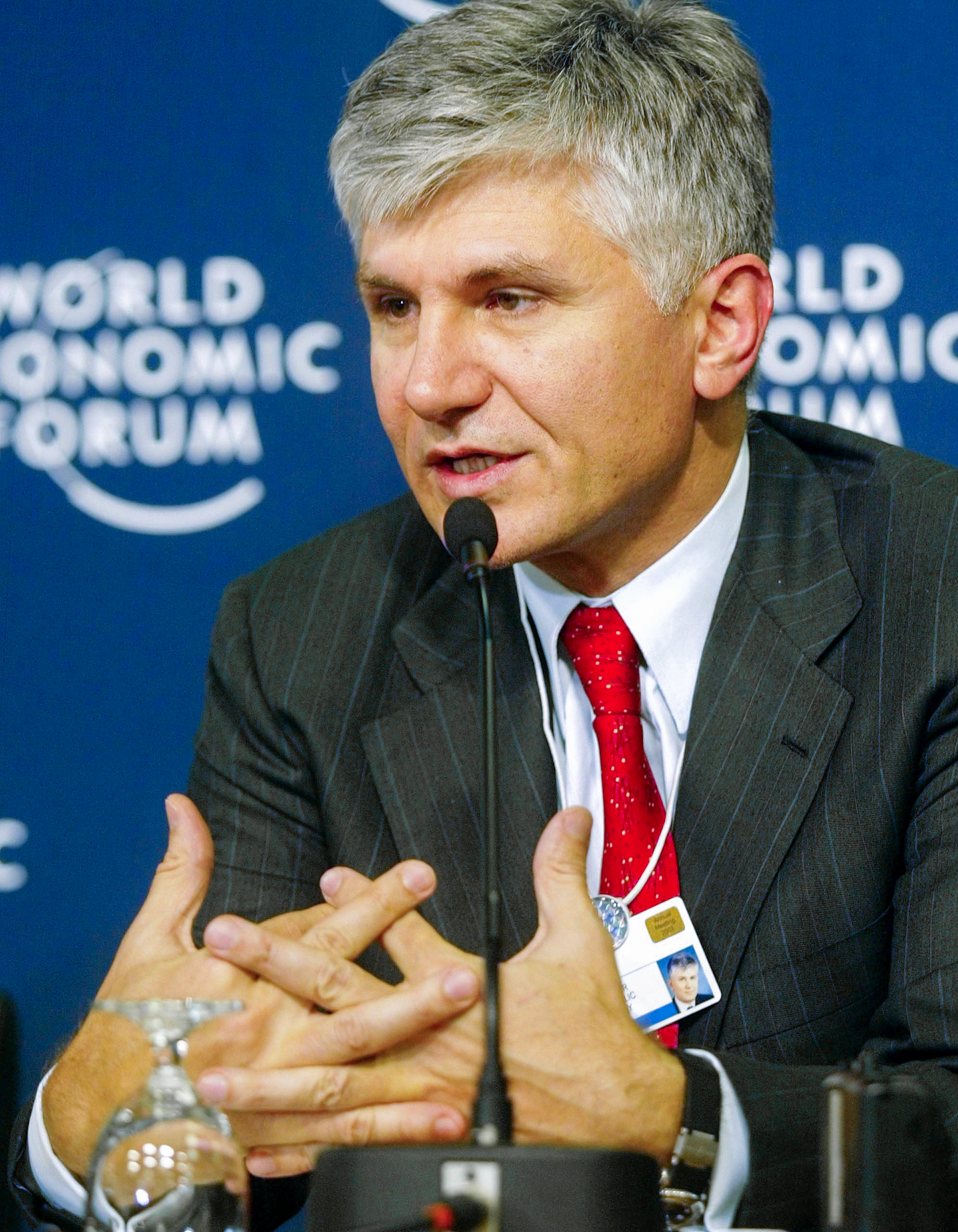
Zoran Đinđić led DS into several opposition coalitions before winning the 2000 elections under the DOS coalition

At a party congress on 25 January 1994, Đinđić was elected president, and Perišić and Miroljub Labus were elected vice-presidents of the party. Mićunović and Vida Ognjenović also resigned from their positions in DS during the congress. Đinđić commented that "Mićunović's time has passed... Mićunović is no Tina Turner who sounds better now than when she was 30" (Mićunovićevo vreme je prošlo... Mićunović nije Tina Tarner pa da bolje zvuči sada nego sa trideset godina). By contrast, Mićunović characterised the manner of Đinđić's takeover of DS as a "combination of Machiavellianism and a revolutionary technique" (spoj makijavelizma i revolucionarne tehnike). During this period, Đinđić also benefited from discreet support in the Milošević-controlled state-run media. After Đinđić became the president of DS, the party was reorganised and moved away from Mićunović's "intellectualistic" approach. In 1995, DS rejected Slobodan Gavrilović's proposal to reunite with DSS, while later that year, Mićunović left DS and then formed the Democratic Centre (DC) in 1996.

In September 1996, DS formed the Together coalition with SPO and the Civic Alliance of Serbia (GSS) to take part in the federal parliamentary election and local elections, which were organised for November 1996. DSS also took part in the coalition, although only at the federal level. Together won 23% of the popular vote in the federal parliamentary elections; it also won local elections in key cities such as Belgrade, Niš, and Novi Sad. However, the Electoral Commission invalidated those local election results, which ultimately led to mass protests that were attended by hundreds of thousands of people in total. The aftermath of the protests resulted in Đinđić and Živković becoming mayors of Belgrade and Niš respectively, after the Electoral Commission recognised the results. In September 1997, Đinđić was removed from office after losing a motion of no confidence staged by SPO.

The Together coalition was dissolved shortly before the 1997 general elections. DS, DSS, and GSS opted to boycott the election, while SPO did not because the government partially accepted their demands. Čedomir Jovanović and Čedomir Antić, who led the Student Political Club during the 1996–1997 protests, joined DS in 1998. In the same year, DS became part of the Alliance for Change, a moderate opposition coalition. This coalition later became part of a wider alliance, the Democratic Opposition of Serbia (DOS) that was formed in January 2000.

Đinđić faced Slobodan Vuksanović at a party congress in February 2000, with Đinđić ultimately retaining the position of party president. Živković and Gavrilović remained vice-presidents of DS and were joined by Predrag Filipov and Boris Tadić. Vuksanović left DS in October 2000 and formed the People's Democratic Party (NDS) in 2001. Milošević, now president of FR Yugoslavia, amended the federal constitution to provide for direct, rather than indirect, elections in the presidential elections that were part of the 2000 general elections. DOS nominated Koštunica as their presidential candidate, who faced Milošević in the presidential election which he won in the first round. However, Milošević declined to accept the results of the presidential election, and the Electoral Commission reported that Koštunica had not won more than 50% of the votes in the first round and that a second round would be scheduled instead. This culminated in mass protests which led to the overthrow of Milošević on 5 October 2000. The Electoral Commission published the actual results two days later, confirming that Koštunica had won in the first round. Together with SPS and SPO, DOS agreed to organise a snap parliamentary election in December 2000 in which DOS won 176 out of 250 seats in the National Assembly.

=== 2001–2004: Post-Milošević period ===
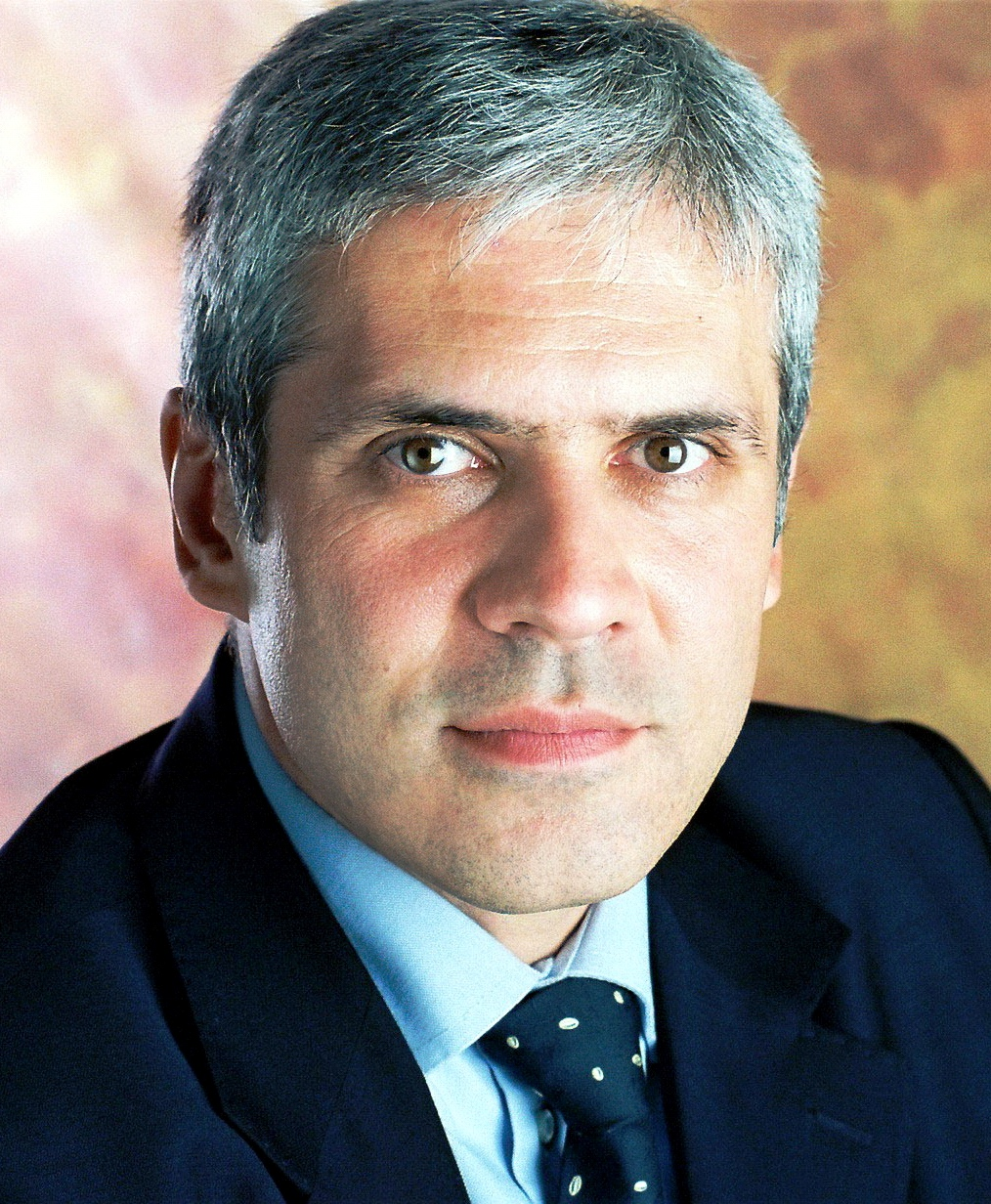
After the assassination of Zoran Đinđić, Boris Tadić was elected president of DS and president of Serbia in 2004

In January 2001, Đinđić was elected prime minister of Serbia; his cabinet was composed of 16 ministers. Following the extradition of Milošević to the International Criminal Tribunal for the former Yugoslavia in June 2001, members of DSS left his cabinet. DS also adopted its new programme that marked the beginning of the party's shift towards the left. DS nominated Labus, who, at the time, was the leader of a citizens' group, in the presidential election that was organised for September 2002. The election proceeded to a second round, in which Labus placed second. However, the election was invalidated because less than 50% of registered voters turned out to vote, and another election was organised for December 2002. Labus subsequently became the president of G17 Plus (G17+), a think tank that he registered as a political party. DS initially stated its intent to support Koštunica in the presidential election but DSS declined their support. The December 2002 presidential election was also invalidated as a result of low turnout, and a third presidential election was organised for November 2003.

Đinđić, who was opposed to organised crime, escaped an assassination attempt in February 2003. Đinđić sought to tackle and reduce organised crime and corruption while he also previously introduced security measures due to the growing threats from paramilitary groups and organised crime. One month later, on 12 March 2003, Zvezdan Jovanović, a member of the Serbian Mafia's Zemun Clan, assassinated Đinđić as he was exiting a vehicle in front of a government building.

Živković succeeded Đinđić as prime minister of Serbia and as the acting president of DS. In the presidential election in 2003, DS supported Mićunović as part of the DOS coalition. He placed second, but the election was invalidated as a result of low (38%) voter turnout. During his premiership, Živković lost confidence from the Social Democratic Party, after which he announced that he would not reshuffle his cabinet but prefer to organise a snap parliamentary election instead; Nataša Mićić, the president of the National Assembly, called for the election to be held in December 2003. DOS then disbanded, and DS nominated Tadić to represent its list in the election instead. DS was on a joint ballot list with DSS, DC, Social Democratic Union (SDU), and List for Sandžak (LZS). The DS list won 37 seats in the National Assembly, out of which 22 went to DS alone, resulting in DS being in opposition.

At the party congress in February 2004, Tadić and Živković nominated themselves as candidates for the presidency, with the former ultimately becoming the president on 22 February 2004. Mićunović's party merged with DS after Tadić's election as president of DS. Otpor, an organisation that played a key role in the overthrow of Milošević, also merged into DS in 2004.

The National Assembly amended the Law on the Election of the President of the Republic in February 2004, abolishing the 50% voter turnout requirement in presidential elections. DS then nominated Tadić as its presidential candidate in the election that was scheduled for June 2004. Tadić placed second in the first round, but won in the second round with 53% of the popular vote, defeating Tomislav Nikolić of SRS. In December 2004, Tadić expelled Jovanović from the party for breaching party protocol; Jovanović formed the Liberal Democratic Party a year later.

=== 2005–2012: the Tadić years ===
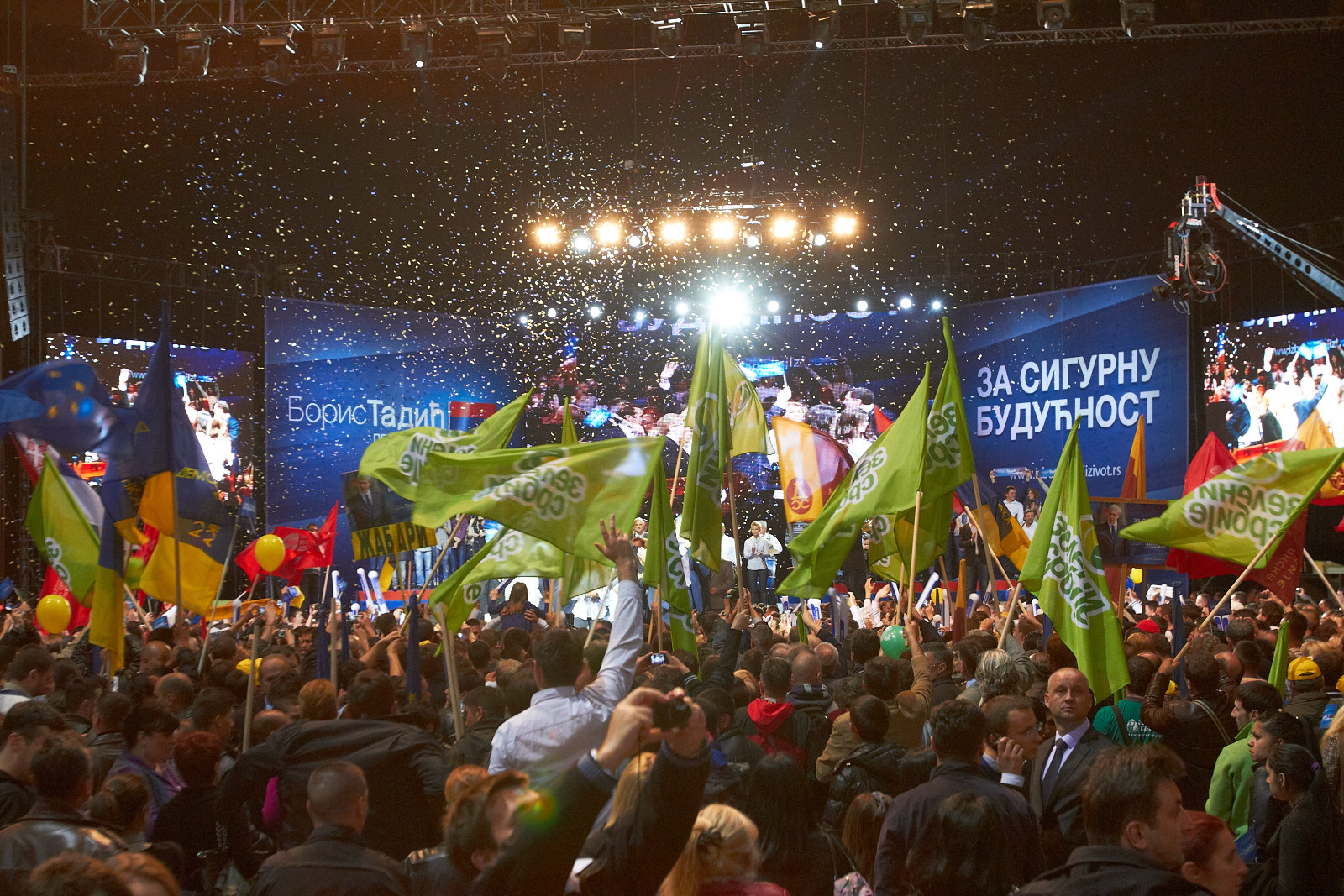
Tadić led DS into a coalition government with SPS in 2008, but was sent into opposition after the 2012 elections

During Tadić's first term as president of Serbia, he apologised to Bosnia and Herzegovina and Croatia for Serbia's role in the Yugoslav Wars and pursued a pro-Western foreign policy. He was reelected, unopposed, as DS president at the party's congress in 2006. In late 2006, G17+ withdrew from Koštunica's government which led Tadić to schedule a snap parliamentary election for January 2007. DS chose Ružica Đinđić, the spouse of Zoran Đinđić, as their ballot representative, campaigning on continuing Đinđić's legacy and fighting against corruption. DS also promised not to form a coalition government with SPS or SRS. DS won over 900,000 votes and negotiated with DSS and G17+ to form a coalition government; Koštunica remained as prime minister and Božidar Đelić of DS was appointed deputy prime minister in his cabinet. In December 2007, Oliver Dulić, the president of the National Assembly, announced that he had scheduled presidential elections for January 2008. DS nominated Tadić for reelection. He again faced Nikolić in the second round of the election and was successfully re-elected.

Shortly after the 2008 presidential election, Kosovo declared its independence from Serbia. Kosovo's declaration of independence, as well as the issue of European integration, resulted in a political crisis between DS and G17+ on one side and DSS on the other. Koštunica embraced anti-Western positions and was a hardliner on the Kosovo issue; he blamed his coalition partners for "creating an unworkable rift in the government" during his resignation speech. Koštunica also said that "he could no longer govern in a coalition with DS", and as a result, Tadić announced a snap parliamentary election for May 2008. Prior to the election, DS formed the For a European Serbia (ZES) coalition composed of DS, G17+, SDP, SPO, the Democratic Alliance of Croats in Vojvodina (DSHV), and the League of Social Democrats of Vojvodina (LSV). This coalition nominated Mićunović as their ballot representative and campaigned on continuing negotiations for the accession of Serbia to the European Union. ZES placed first, winning 102 seats in the National Assembly; DS won 64 seats out of those 102. After the election, DS was excluded from government formation talks, and in June 2008, it entered talks with SPS to form a coalition government. DS and SPS agreed to continue Serbia's accession to the European Union, work on fighting crime and corruption, and enact social justice reforms to help the vulnerable sections of the population. DS and SPS formalised their cooperation after the election by signing a reconciliation agreement. The new government was formed in July 2008, with Mirko Cvetković, an independent politician affiliated with DS, serving as prime minister and Ivica Dačić, the leader of SPS, serving as deputy prime minister.

The DS-led government was faced with the arrest and trial of Radovan Karadžić, the 2008 Kosovo declaration of independence, and the 2008 financial crisis and the Great Recession. The Serbian Progressive Party (SNS), now led by Nikolić, arranged mass protests in 2011, demanding that Tadić call snap elections; Tadić called an election in March 2012 to be held two months later in May. In April, however, Tadić announced that he would resign as president and that presidential elections would be held on the same day as the parliamentary election. DS led the Choice for a Better Life (IZBŽ) coalition that also included DSHV, LSV, the Social Democratic Party of Serbia, the Greens of Serbia, and the Christian Democratic Party of Serbia. Dragan Đilas, the deputy president of DS and mayor of Belgrade, was chosen as the coalition's ballot representative. DS campaigned on economic recovery, emphasising attracting foreign investments and developing small business. IZBŽ placed second, winning 67 seats, and 49 of those were won by DS alone. In the presidential election, Tadić placed first in the first round of voting, but lost to Nikolić in the second.

Following the 2012 parliamentary election, SPS successfully formed a government with SNS, and DS went into opposition. Đilas, who was re-elected as mayor of Belgrade, was positioned as a prominent candidate to succeed Tadić as president of DS. An extraordinary party congress was called for 25 November 2012, with Đilas and Branimir Kuzmanović put forward as the only candidates to succeed Tadić as president of DS. Đilas was elected president in a landslide victory and Tadić was awarded the title of an honorary president. Additionally, Pajtić was re-elected as vice-president and was joined by Nataša Vučković, Vesna Martinović, Dejan Nikolić, Miodrag Rakić, Goran Ćirić, and Jovan Marković. Živković criticised the measure to award Tadić the honorary president title and described it as a "rotten compromise between Đilas and Tadić"; this led to his departure from DS. After leaving DS, Živković announced the formation of the New Party (Nova). As president of DS, Đilas ordered former government ministers to resign from the National Assembly. This order received support from Tadić, but was criticised by Mićunović and Dušan Petrović, the former minister of agriculture, who refused to resign.

=== 2013–2017: Internal crisis ===
Petrović was expelled from DS in January 2013 and subsequently formed a parliamentary group named Together for Serbia (ZZS) which was later registered as a political party. Former minister of foreign affairs Vuk Jeremić was expelled from DS in February 2013. Jeremić claimed that the party's decision was unconstitutional and filed a suit in the Constitutional Court. His appeal was rejected; Jeremić complied with the decision and left DS, although he kept his seat in the National Assembly. DS also dropped to 13 percent support amongst the public while SNS received over 40 percent. In September 2013, SNS filed a motion of no confidence against Đilas, resulting in his dismissal. SNS cited DS' poor results and asserted that "DS lost legitimacy" as reasons for the motion while Đilas stated that "this is the beginning of a dictatorship and a one-party system" (smatra da je to uvod u diktaturu i jednopartijski sistem). As a consequence, local boards of DS called for Đilas to resign as president of DS. Tadić was accused of conspiring against Đilas in a bid to return to the post of president of DS, and the accusations called attention to the conflict between Đilas and Tadić. This resulted in an internal party motion of no confidence against Đilas, which he survived. Đilas and Pajtić also suggested that an extraordinary congress should be held after the Belgrade City Assembly election which was ultimately scheduled for March 2014. Tadić left DS on 30 January 2014, citing his disagreement with party leadership. Shortly after, Tadić announced that he would begin collecting signatures to register his new party, the New Democratic Party later renamed the Social Democratic Party, to participate in the snap parliamentary election scheduled to be held on the same day as the Belgrade City Assembly election.

DS announced that it would take part in the 2014 parliamentary election with Nova, DSHV, Rich Serbia, and the United Trade Unions of Serbia "Sloga" as part of the With the Democratic Party for a Democratic Serbia coalition. The coalition only won 19 seats in the National Assembly; DS won 17 seats and Nova won 2. In the Belgrade City Assembly election, the DS coalition won 22 seats. After the elections, an extraordinary congress was organised on 31 May 2014. Pajtić faced Đilas; the former was successfully elected as president of DS. Đilas subsequently resigned from his position as a member of the National Assembly and left DS in June 2016. Borko Stefanović, a vice-president of DS, left the party in December 2015, citing ideological differences, and then formed the Serbian Left (LS). In March 2016, Nikolić called for snap parliamentary elections to take place in April 2016. DS then formed the "For a Just Serbia" coalition with Nova, ZZS, DSHV, and Together for Šumadija. The coalition won 16 seats in the National Assembly, 12 of which were occupied by DS. After the election, a party congress was organised for 24 September 2016. Pajtić faced Dragan Šutanovac, Zoran Lutovac, and Srboljub Antić in the leadership election. He ultimately lost to Šutanovac in the first round. Marković, Branislav Lečić, Nada Kolundžija, Goran Salak, and Tamara Tripić were elected vice-presidents.

In January 2017, Šutanovac announced that DS would support Saša Janković in the 2017 presidential election instead of filing its own candidate. DS also called for other parties to rally around Janković as a joint opposition candidate. During the campaign, Janković used the infrastructure of DS to position himself as the leader of the opposition. He placed second behind Aleksandar Vučić of SNS, winning only 16% of the popular vote. After the election, Janković stopped cooperating with DS and formed the Movement of Free Citizens (PSG) in May 2017. In preparation for the 2018 Belgrade City Assembly election, DS advocated for the opposition parties to participate on a joint list. By the end of 2017, DS had announced that it would take part in a coalition with Nova, with Šutanovac as their mayoral candidate.

=== 2018–2024: the Lutovac years ===
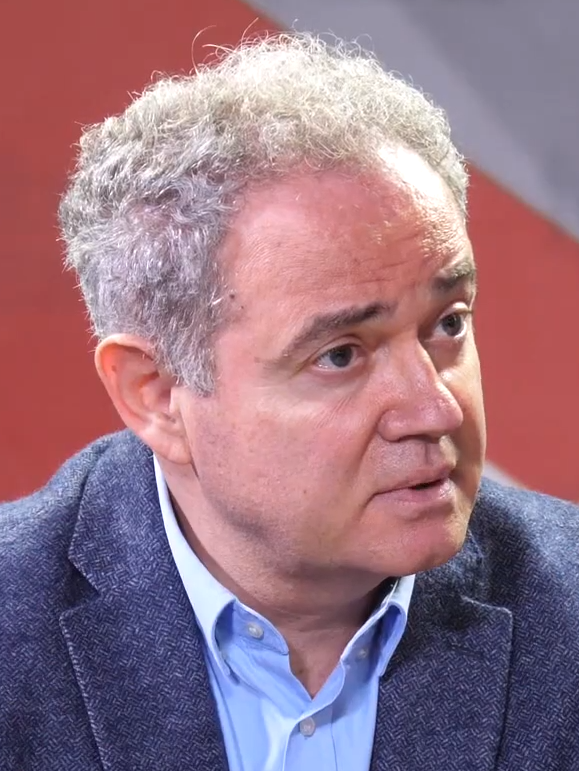
Zoran Lutovac was the president of DS from 2018 to 2024

DS and Nova were joined by Tadić's SDS in January 2018, while the Green Ecological Party – The Greens also appeared on the ballot. However, the coalition did not win any seats as it only received 2% of the popular vote. This led to the resignations of Šutanovac and Balša Božović, the president of the DS branch in Belgrade.

In April 2018, DS announced that a party congress would be arranged for 2 June 2018. The leadership election was contested by Lutovac, Branislav Lečić, and Gordana Čomić. Lutovac ultimately won the election. Nikolić, Aleksandra Jerkov, Dragana Rakić, Dragoslav Šumarac, and Saša Paunović were elected vice-presidents. Lutovac announced that DS "must organise itself" and that DS would cooperate with the Alliance for Serbia (SZS), a group in the City Assembly of Belgrade led by Đilas. However, SZS was reorganised as a nationwide coalition in September 2018 that, in addition to DS, included ZZS, Sloga, LS, Jeremić's People's Party (Narodna), Dveri, the Movement for Reversal (PZP), and Healthy Serbia. In internal DS deliberations, founding members Mićunović and Ognjenović, as well as Čomić and Šutanovac, were opposed to joining SZS. After the physical attack on the leader of LS in November 2018, SZS organised mass anti-government protests. In January 2019, DS announced its intent to boycott the sessions of the National Assembly, the City Assembly of Belgrade, and the Assembly of Vojvodina, claiming that the bodies did not have legitimacy due to the government's obstruction of the parliamentary opposition by allegedly "violating the rules of Parliament, as well as laws and the Constitution". DS also signed the Agreement with the People, which stated that if fair and free conditions for elections were not met, the signatory would boycott the 2020 parliamentary election.

In February 2019, Lutovac and Tadić began discussing merging their parties to become "the main option for civic-democratic voters that will be able to integrate voters that are against Aleksandar Vučić" (glavna opcija za građansko-demokratske birače i koja će biti u stanju da integriše snage koje su protiv Aleksandra Vučića). This decision was approved by both DS and SDS. ZZS, led by Nebojša Zelenović, also joined the talks. The merger was formalised as a union in May 2019 under the name United Democratic Party. The merger was to be completed upon the relaxation of COVID-19 pandemic measures. During the COVID-19 pandemic, SDS left the process, with Tadić later claiming that Lutovac allegedly put an end to the merger. As part of SZS, in September 2019 DS announced that it would boycott the 2020 parliamentary election. The decision to boycott the election received criticism from some DS members, such as Mićunović and Šutanovac, who stated that DS officials in response would create citizens' groups to encourage voting in the elections. During a session of the party's main board in November 2019, Lečić, Jerkov, Božović, Radoslav Milojičić, and Slobodan Milosavljević left a meeting to attempt to break quorum after demanding a new leadership election. Lutovac described the move as a coup d'état and claimed that Vučić was attempting to break up DS. He also later claimed that a group inside DS was attempting to cooperate with Vučić. After attending a session in the National Assembly in February 2020, Čomić was expelled from DS. She was later featured on United Democratic Serbia's ballot and became a government minister.

DS' scheduled March 2020 party congress was postponed as a result of the COVID-19 pandemic and rescheduled for 21 June 2020 when the parliamentary election was also scheduled to take place. During the party congress, a group of DS members left the congress to hold an alternate leadership election. The congress continued on 28 June 2020; the dissatisfied group held its own congress in Belgrade with Tadić in attendance, while Lutovac held the official party congress in Šabac. Lutovac then expelled Lečić, Božović, Milojičić, and Milosavljević from DS. The dissatisfied group then chose Lečić as president. The Ministry of Public Administration and Local Self-Government rejected Lečić's request to be recognised as the legal president of DS, concluding that Lutovac was its legitimate president. Lečić then formed the Democrats of Serbia that later merged into Tadić's SDS.

During the conflict between the two DS factions, SZS was dissolved and succeeded by the United Opposition of Serbia (UOPS). However, UOPS dissolved in January 2021 due to a dispute regarding inter-party dialogues on electoral conditions between Narodna and Party of Freedom and Justice (SSP), the party led by Đilas. DS organised a congress on 4 July 2021; Lutovac was reelected president and Rakić was reelected deputy president. Tatjana Manojlović, Nenad Mitrović, Miodrag Gavrilović, and Branimir Jovančićević were elected vice-presidents. After the congress, DS, Narodna, SSP, and PSG announced that they would cooperate in the 2022 Serbian general election. Their coalition was formalised in February 2022 under the name United for the Victory of Serbia (UZPS); they nominated Zdravko Ponoš of Narodna as their presidential candidate. UZPS won 14 percent of the popular vote in the parliamentary election; DS won 10 seats. Ponoš placed second in the presidential election behind Vučić. After the election, UZPS was dissolved with Lutovac stating that it was only an election alliance. Shortly before the first constitutive session of the National Assembly on 1 August 2022, Narodna, DS, Do not let Belgrade drown, and Together nominated Lutovac for vice-president of the National Assembly. He was successfully elected on 2 August 2022. The Movement of Free Serbia, which was a part of the UZPS coalition, merged into DS in September 2022.

After the May 2023 Belgrade school shooting and mass murder in Mladenovac and Smederevo, DS was one of the organising parties of the mass protests. In August 2023, DS, Together, and Serbia Centre signed a cooperation agreement. DS became part of the Serbia Against Violence (SPN) coalition in October 2023, a coalition of political parties organising the 2023 protests. SPN announced that it would contest the parliamentary, Vojvodina provincial, and Belgrade City Assembly elections, all scheduled for 17 December 2023. Manojlović resigned as vice-president of DS when her name was absent from the SPN electoral list for the parliamentary elections. In the parliamentary election, SPN won 65 seats, 8 of which went to DS. After the elections, SPN organised anti-government protests until 30 December. Once the 14th National Assembly of Serbia was constituted, DS formed its own parliamentary group, with Lutovac as its leader. The City Assembly of Belgrade, on the other hand, was not constituted because the quorum was not met during its constitutive session. Because of this, a new election was called for 2 June. SPN remained divided regarding the participation in the 2 June election, with DS being neutral on the matter. This led to the dissolution of SPN and establishment of the We Choose Belgrade electoral list. In the 2024 Belgrade City Assembly election, this electoral list only won 14 seats, 2 of which went to DS.

=== 2024–present: Consolidation under Milivojević and support for the Student List ===
DS organised internal leadership elections on 14 December 2024, with Lutovac, Gavrilović, and Srđan Milivojević registering as candidates for the president of the party. Initially, Gavrilović had the support of most delegates, while Milivojević had none. However, Milivojević triumphed in the second round of the election and became the new president. Shortly after he became president, Milivojević launched a campaign of consolidation of progressive political parties. The Together party signed a declaration of merging on 27 December and became part of DS. Since then, student-led anti-corruption protests have been held in Serbia. DS has supported the protests and pledged not to participate in the 2026 Serbian parliamentary election if students form an electoral list. In August 2026, DS renamed its parliamentary group "Deputies with the Students: For Election Control"; deputies from other parties and independents then joined it, doubling its membership to 16, with the aim of securing more places on polling-station committees, which the group put at the disposal of the Student List. In line with its pledge, DS did not contest the election, held on 25 October 2026, which the Student List won with 140 of the 250 seats.

== Ideology and platform ==
=== Mićunović and Đinđić era ===
DS was a catch-all party during its early period and was composed of ideologically heterogeneous groups. It included the founders of the Praxis School, Mićunović and Đinđić, who were labelled liberals, as well as Čavoški, Koštunica, and Milošević, who argued for the adoption of a stronger anti-communist position inside the party. DS was also divided on nationalism, with members such as Gligorov and Inić arguing that nationalism should be solved within a common Yugoslav state, while members like Đogo favoured a Greater Serbian policy. DS supported a mixed economy with a strong role of the market, but it also sought to implement reforms towards establishing a modern market economy and integrating Serbia into the European Community. DS adopted a "civic and centrist identity", and in its Letter of Intent of December 1989, it stated its support for the establishment of a democratic and multi-party system. Regarding Yugoslavia, DS supported federalisation and a pluralistic democratic order to guarantee human security and personal freedom and decrease ethnic conflicts.

Political scientist Dijana Vukomanović has argued that DS has promoted liberalism in an economic and democratic sense since its formation, and noted that, in its 1990 programme, DS emphasised establishing a representative parliamentary democracy, and advancing human and political freedoms and civic rights. By contrast, political scientist Vukašin Pavlović has noted that DS could be described as centre-right at the time of its formation in 1990 due to its founders' ideological positions. Likewise, Metropolitan University Prague lecturer Marko Stojić has described DS in its founding era as centre-right because its programme advocated a liberal market economy and minimal role for the state. Political scientist Vladimir Goati has positioned the 1990s DS on the moderate right, noting its support for private property rights and the omission of the regulatory and redistributive functions of the state from its 1992 programme. Goati has also categorised the party as liberal-democratic, explaining that after 1993, DS began to use less anti-communist rhetoric compared with other opposition parties. In 1991, then-Washington Post journalist Blaine Harden described DS as a "moderate, opposition" party, and in a 1999 report, BBC News described DS as centrist. Scholar Slaviša Orlović has noted that the party "provide[d] a balance of goals of the right and left political traditions".

Political scientist Slobodan Antonić has stated that although DS was formed as a civic party—in its 1992 programme, DS identified itself as a "civic, national, liberal, and socially responsible" party—it had a "nationalistic phase" in the mid-1990s, supporting the "modernisation of the country" as well as the self-determination of Serbs, but that, soon after, it returned to civic positions. Additionally, political scientist Jovan Komšić has noted that DS moderated its stance on nationalism after the 1995 Dayton Agreement, thereafter focusing on the "democratisation of Serbia". Goati has described DS as an anti-system party because it opposed the 1990 constitution.

Under Đinđić, DS shifted to more pragmatic and flexible approaches and principles, becoming the leading anti-Milošević party after 1998. Đinđić has been described as a pro-Western reformist and a technocrat. DS advocated for denationalisation and free mass distribution of shares, and established the Centre for Privatisation. However, DS also supported the right to work, trade union rights, social security, and the fight against unemployment. DS described these economic positions as "people's capitalism", but the party dropped these positions after coming to power in 2001, when it began promoting neoliberalism. DS was also associated with the "shock therapy" group of economic policies. DS supported policies that would bring Serbia closer to the West and reintegrate Serbia into the international community, and also supported the extradition of Serbian citizens that were indicted by the ICTY.

=== Tadić era ===
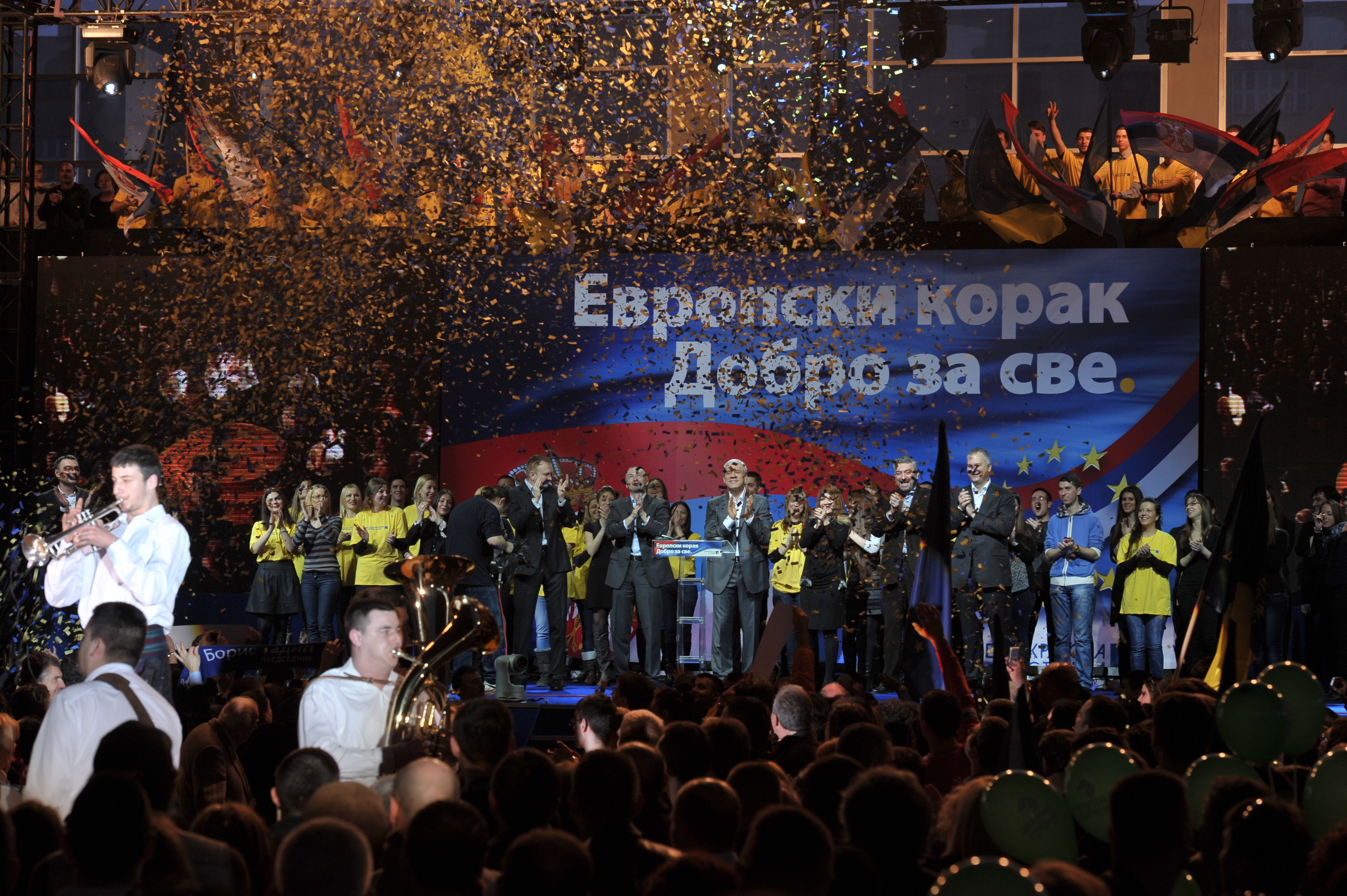
DS officials at a gathering dedicated to Serbia gaining candidate status for European Union membership

Despite trying to position itself as a social democratic party after Đinđić's assassination, Vukomanović has argued that the leadership of DS did not "dare to take a decisive step towards the left". Political scientist Zoran Stojiljković has noted that, instead, it shifted towards social liberalism. On the other hand, political scientist Zoran Slavujević argued in 2003 that, at the time, DS "was still positioned between the centre and centre-right". Others have described DS under Tadić as centrist, and as associated with liberalism and social liberalism.

Tadić has been described as a liberal, a label he accepts. During his leadership, he was considered to be popular amongst businessmen due to his support for the accession of Serbia to the European Union. Despite being supported by liberals, DS would occasionally position itself as a "state-building party of the centre-left". During Tadić's tenure, DS was the leading party of the liberal and pro-European bloc, but it also promoted privatisation to accelerate Serbia's economic development. Stojić has noted that DS' programmatic shift towards social democracy began in 2007, but while in government, DS did not pursue a social democratic agenda.

DS under Tadić has been described as internationalist and pro-Western. Although it also declared itself in favour of military neutrality, DS expressed sympathy for, and its government ministers cooperated with, NATO. DS also believed that the political status of Kosovo should be solved via diplomacy, although it did not adopt a clear stance on the issue following Kosovo's declaration of independence in 2008. Under Tadić, DS took a balanced approach towards foreign relations; for example, a year after Kosovo's declaration, Tadić hosted U.S. Vice-president Joe Biden and Russian President Dmitry Medvedev for talks. Shortly before the 2012 elections, Serbia received candidate status for European Union membership.

To attract ethnic minority voters, DS exploited the cultural-ideological cleft in Vojvodina, seeking to attract voters from minority interests parties, and promoted regionalism. DS also advocated for the improvement of the standard of living and for a balanced regional development, and proposed the creation of an independent body that would implement anti-corruption measures in the judiciary.

=== Post-Tadić era ===
After 2012, DS shifted further to the left and began identifying itself as social democratic, a description which has since been accepted by scholars and political observers. Stojić has categorised DS as social democratic and as a party with a "liberal legacy". DS has been described as being on the centre-left of the political spectrum. By contrast, Dušan Spasojević, a professor at the Faculty of Political Sciences of the University of Belgrade, has described DS' social views as being orientated towards the left. A former leader of DS, Zoran Lutovac, describes himself as a leftist.

DS has served in opposition to SNS since 2012. It has been critical of the government's stance on Kosovo, although it supported the 2013 Brussels Agreement. In an interview, Šutanovac described the Kosovo issue as a "not an everyday political problem". During the North Kosovo crisis in 2023, DS voiced its opposition to the Ohrid Agreement, with Lutovac claiming that "the agreement does not respect the interests of Serbia and the rights of Serbs in Kosovo" but also because DS "does not want to give Vučić legitimacy for what he did".

When Đilas led DS in opposition to SNS during the 2014 election, he pledged to provide free textbooks for students and full salaries for pregnant women, increase wages for healthcare workers, and help pensioners. DS is opposed to jadarite mining and was one of the signatories of an agreement on the prohibition of exploration, exploitation, and processing of lithium in Serbia in October 2021.

DS has declared itself to be "the bearer of the most progressive ideas"; it is in favour of protecting workers, minorities, and the environment, and it supports guaranteed rights to healthcare, education, and pensions. In 2014, the Gay Straight Alliance, an association that promotes LGBT rights in Serbia, described DS as the "most positive party towards the LGBT community". DS has condemned violence against the LGBT community and in August 2022, it supported hosting 2022 EuroPride in Belgrade. It has also criticised the attacks on the Pride Info Centre in Belgrade.

=== Demographic characteristics ===
Before the federal parliamentary election in December 1992, a majority of DS supporters preferred a citizen state (građanska država) over a nation state (nacionalna država). According to political scientist Dragomir Pantić, supporters of DS in the 1990s shared similar characteristics with supporters of DSS, GSS, and other minority parties. DS supporters were young and urban, and they came from the middle and upper classes. Public intellectuals, technicians, and those who worked in the private sector were also supporters of DS. After 2000, DS voters professed liberal-democratic values; they were also less religious, opposed to authoritarianism and centralism, and supportive of political reforms. Political scientist Ilija Vujačić, however, has argued that DS supporters in the 21st century skewed more towards the political centre. In 2007, political scientist Srećko Mihailović noted that a majority of DS supporters identified with the left—18% with the far-left, 22% with the left-wing, and 25% with the centre-left—while 18% described themselves as centrist.

According to a 2005 opinion poll, 66% of DS supporters thought Serbia should rely on the European Union for Serbia's foreign policy. In opinion polls conducted prior to the 2008 elections, a majority of DS supporters declared themselves to be pro-European.

In 2012, a majority of DS voters were female, below 50 years old, and possessed a high school or university diploma. DS supporters were mostly workers, technicians, officials, and dependents. In 2014, 80% of DS supporters were female, 60% of supporters were under 50 years old, and a majority of supporters held either a high school or university diploma. In 2014, most DS supporters were tolerant of diversity and they rejected authoritarianism and nationalism. By 2016, most DS supporters were younger than 40. November 2020 research conducted by the Heinrich Böll Foundation found that supporters of DS viewed themselves as socially progressive.

== Organisation ==
As of December 2024, DS is led by Srđan Milivojević who was elected president in 2024. At the same party congress in December 2024, Rakić was elected deputy president, while Mitrović, Jovančićević, Nebojša Novaković, and Tijana Blagojević were elected vice-presidents. Milivojević is also the party's parliamentary leader in the National Assembly. DS is colloquially known as žuti (yellows) due to one of its main colours.

DS has its headquarters at Nušićeva 6/II in Belgrade. From 1990 to 1998, DS put out the newspaper Demokratija, Since July 2021, the party has published the newspaper Bedem. Its youth wing, the Democratic Youth, has been led by Stefan Ninić since February 2022. DS also operates a women's wing called Women's Forum. DS membership is open to every adult citizen of Serbia who is not a member of another party organisation. In December 2010, DS reported that it had 185,192 members; by 2013, the number had increased to 196,673 members. However, only 18,459 DS members had the right to vote in the 2016 leadership election.

DS has city, local, and municipal branches, as well as a special branch in Vojvodina. DS has an assembly, a main board, a presidency, an executive board, a statutory commission—which includes the centre of departmental committees and the centre for education—a supervisory board, a political council, and an ethics committee. DS also operates the Foundation for Improving Democracy "Ljuba Davidović". The main board is the highest body of DS; the president of DS represents and manages the party. Ten political parties have been formed as splits from DS: the DC, DSS, now known as the New Democratic Party of Serbia, G17+, LDP, Nova, NDS, LS, SLS, SDS, and ZZS.

=== International cooperation ===
DS has been a member of the Socialist International since 2003, and in December 2006, it became an associate member of the Party of European Socialists (PES). According to Doris Pack, a German politician and close friend of Đinđić, Đinđić made the decision to apply to become an associate member of the Party of European Socialists; Zoran Alimpić, a senior DS official, stated that the decision came as a surprise to senior DS officials. DS is also affiliated with the Progressive Alliance. Its youth wing is a member of the Young European Socialists and a full member of the International Union of Socialist Youth. In the Parliamentary Assembly of the Council of Europe, DS was associated with the Socialist Group.

In 2014, Pajtić—with Sergey Stanishev, then-president of the Party of European Socialists, Victor Ponta, then-leader of the Social Democratic Party of Romania, and Zlatko Lagumdžija, then-leader of the Social Democratic Party of Bosnia and Herzegovina—met with Li Yuanchao, an official of the Chinese Communist Party, to discuss economic relations between China and Europe. In 2017, Šutanovac met with Zoran Zaev, the leader of the Social Democratic Union of Macedonia, to discuss regional cooperation, Serbia and North Macedonia's integration into the European Union, and cooperation inside the Party of European Socialists. In April 2026, DS representatives took part in the Global Progressive Mobilisation event hosted by PES.

=== List of presidents ===
#	President		Birth–Death	Term start	Term end
1	Dragoljub Mićunović	Dragoljub Mićunović in the National Assembly	1930–2026	3 February 1990	25 January 1994
2	Zoran Đinđić	A cropped image of Zoran Đinđić with Bill Gates	1952–2003	25 January 1994	12 March 2003 (assassinated)
–	Zoran Živković (acting)	An image of Zoran Živković at Medija centar	1960–	12 March 2003	22 February 2004
3	Boris Tadić	An image of Boris Tadić in 2010	1958–	22 February 2004	25 November 2012
4	Dragan Đilas	An image of Dragan Đilas in 2013	1967–	25 November 2012	31 May 2014
5	Bojan Pajtić	An image of Bojan Pajtić in 2015	1970–	31 May 2014	24 September 2016
6	Dragan Šutanovac	An image of Dragan Šutanovac in 2016	1968–	24 September 2016	2 June 2018
7	Zoran Lutovac	An image of Zoran Lutovac in 2020	1964–	2 June 2018	14 December 2024
8	Srđan Milivojević	An image of Srđan Milivojević in 2023	1965–	14 December 2024	Incumbent

== Electoral performance ==
=== Parliamentary elections ===
National Assembly of Serbia
Year	Leader	Popular vote	% of popular vote	#	# of seats	Seat change	Coalition	Status	Ref.
1990	Dragoljub Mićunović	374,887	7.78%	▲3rd	7 / 250	▲7	–	Opposition	
1992	Dragoljub Mićunović	196,347	4.42%	▼4th	6 / 250	▼1	–	Opposition	
1993	Dragoljub Mićunović	497,582	12.06%	4th	29 / 250	▲23	–	Opposition	
1997	Zoran Đinđić	Election boycott			0 / 250	▼29	–	Extra-parliamentary	
2000	Zoran Đinđić	2,402,387	65.69%	▲1st	45 / 250	▲45	DOS	Government	
2003	Boris Tadić	481,249	12.75%	▼3rd	22 / 250	▼23	DS–GSS–SDU–LZS	Opposition	
2007	Boris Tadić	915,854	23.08%	▲2nd	60 / 250	▲38	DS–SDP–DSHV	Government	
2008	Boris Tadić	1,590,200	39.25%	▲1st	64 / 250	▲4	ZES	Government	
2012	Boris Tadić	863,294	23.09%	▼2nd	49 / 250	▼15	IZBŽ	Opposition	
2014	Dragan Đilas	216,634	6.23%	▼3rd	17 / 250	▼32	DS–DSHV–Nova–BS	Opposition	
2016	Bojan Pajtić	227,589	6.20%	▼5th	12 / 250	▼5	DS–Nova–DSHV–ZZS–ZZŠ	Opposition	
2020	Zoran Lutovac	Election boycott			0 / 250	▼12	SZS	Extra-parliamentary	
2022	Zoran Lutovac	520,469	14.09%	▲2nd	10 / 250	▲10	UZPS	Opposition	
2023	Zoran Lutovac	902,450	24.32%	2nd	8 / 250	▼2	SPN	Opposition	
2026	Srđan Milivojević	Did not participate			0 / 250	▼8	Supported SL	Extra-parliamentary	

View source data.

=== Presidential elections ===
President of Serbia
Year	Candidate	1st round popular vote		% of popular vote	2nd round popular vote		% of popular vote	Notes	Ref.
1990	Did not participate								–
1992	Milan Panić	2nd	1,516,693	34.65%	—N/a	—	—	Supported Panić	
Sep 1997	Election boycott							Election annulled due to low turnout	–
Dec 1997	Election boycott								–
Sep–Oct 2002	Miroljub Labus	2nd	995,200	27.96%	2nd	921,094	31.62%	Supported Labus; election annulled due to low turnout	
Dec 2002	Did not participate							Election annulled due to low turnout	–
2003	Dragoljub Mićunović	2nd	893,906	36.67%	—N/a	—	—	Election annulled due to low turnout	
2004	Boris Tadić	2nd	853,584	27.70%	1st	1,681,528	53.97%		
2008	Boris Tadić	2nd	1,457,030	36.08%	1st	2,304,467	51.19%		
2012	Boris Tadić	1st	989,454	26.50%	2nd	1,481,952	48.84%		
2017	Saša Janković	2nd	507,728	16.63%	—N/a	—	—	Supported Janković	
2022	Zdravko Ponoš	2nd	698,538	18.84%	—N/a	—	—	Supported Ponoš	

=== Federal parliamentary elections ===
Year	Leader	Popular vote	% of popular vote	#	# of seats	Seat change	Coalition	Status	Notes	Ref.
May 1992	Dragoljub Mićunović	Election boycott			0 / 136	0	–	Extra-parliamentary		–
1992–1993	Dragoljub Mićunović	280,183	6.32%	▲4th	5 / 138	▲5	–	Opposition		
1996	Zoran Đinđić	969,296	23.77%	▲2nd	22 / 138	▲17	Together	Opposition	Coalition Together won 22 seats in total	
2000	Zoran Đinđić	2,040,646	43.86%	▲1st	58 / 138	▲36	DOS	Government	DOS won 58 seats in total	
2000	Zoran Đinđić	2,092,799	46.23%	▲1st	10 / 40	▲10	DOS	Government	DOS won 10 seats in total	

View source data.

=== Federal presidential elections ===
President of FR Yugoslavia
Year	Candidate	1st round popular vote		% of popular vote	2nd round popular vote		% of popular vote	Notes	Ref.
2000	Vojislav Koštunica	1st	2,470,304	51.71%	—N/a	—	—	Supported Koštunica	
