= Srđan Milivojević =

Serbian politician

- Срђан Миливојевић
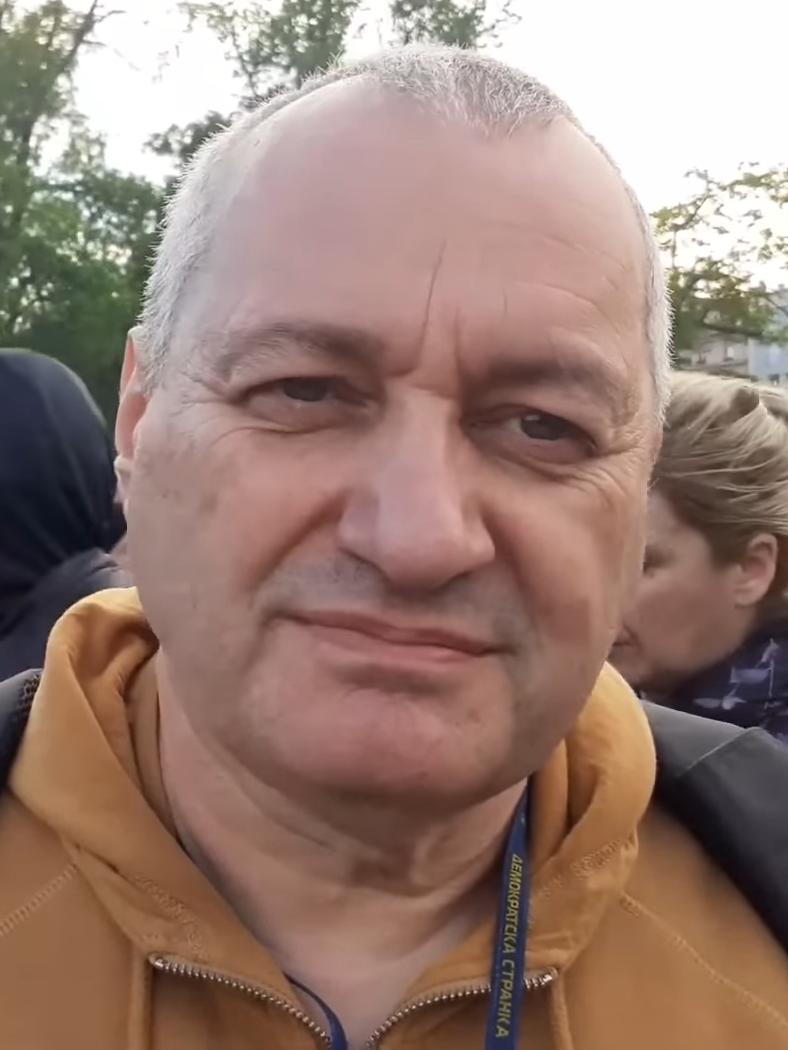
- Milivojević in 2023

President of the Democratic Party
- Incumbent
- Assumed office 14 December 2024
- Preceded by: Zoran Lutovac

Member of the National Assembly
- In office 1 August 2022 – 17 November 2026

Member of the National Assembly
- In office 14 February 2007 – 16 April 2014

Personal details
- Born: 2 August 1965 (age 61) Kruševac, SR Serbia, SFR Yugoslavia
- Party: Otpor (1999–2004); DS (2004–present)
- Education: University of Belgrade
- Occupation: Politician

Srđan Milivojević (Serbian: Срђан Миливојевић; born 2 August 1965) is a Serbian politician who has been the president of the Democratic Party (DS) since December 2024. He has served as a member of the National Assembly since 1 August 2022, having previously served from 2007 to 2014.

== Biography ==
Milivojević was born on 2 August 1965 in Kruševac, SR Serbia, SFR Yugoslavia. He graduated from the Faculty of Agriculture at the University of Belgrade. After completing his studies, he engaged in animal husbandry, and later ran a marketing agency and worked in catering. He also owned a fast food restaurant.

Milivojević has said that he took part in the anti-bureaucratic revolution, but refused to attend Slobodan Milošević's Gazimestan speech, as it was already clear to him "who Milošević is and what he wants". He took part in the 9 March 1991 protest and in the protests against Milošević, and later joined Otpor, whose candidate he was in the 2003 parliamentary election, though he was not elected.

In 2004, Otpor merged into the Democratic Party (DS), and Milivojević joined the DS. He was first elected to the National Assembly in the 2007 parliamentary election. Milivojević was later re-elected in 2008 and 2012, and returned to the Assembly in the 2022 election. In the December 2023 election, he was elected seventh on the list of the Serbia Against Violence coalition, of which the DS was a member, and his mandate was confirmed on 6 February 2024.

=== President of the Democratic Party ===
In December 2024, Milivojević was elected president of the DS, defeating the incumbent president Zoran Lutovac and Miodrag Gavrilović in the party leadership election. Following his election, he said that there were two ways out of Serbia's political crisis: for Aleksandar Vučić to leave the country, or for a transitional government to be formed that would organise free and fair elections. Ahead of the 2026 Serbian parliamentary election, the DS under his leadership decided not to run its own list and instead endorsed the Student List.

== Political positions ==
Milivojević has described himself as having always been an anti-communist. He has said that he was raised in a traditional, religious and monarchist family. As a second-year student in 1987, he demanded the removal of a bust of Josip Broz Tito from the hall of the Faculty of Agriculture. In 1990, when his professors offered him membership in the newly formed Socialist Party of Serbia, he refused, asking whether the party would return to his grandfather what the communists had seized from him in 1947, condemn the communist terror, and return property to the Church. In Kruševac, he was among the most vocal advocates of a memorial to the victims of executions carried out by the communist authorities at Bagdala hill after the town's liberation in 1944. In 2005, as a member of the municipal assembly, he proposed that the execution site be arranged as a cemetery, noting that his father had witnessed the executions there as a child.

Milivojević supports Serbia's accession to the European Union. After the United States imposed sanctions on the Petroleum Industry of Serbia (NIS) in 2025, he argued that the solution was the full alignment of Serbia's public policies with EU standards, and accused Vučić of promoting Russian propaganda for years. In 2026, when the EU suspended payments to Serbia under its Growth Plan, he blamed the government, saying the EU was asking only for the minimum of any normal state: an independent judiciary, free media, and institutions that do not serve electoral fraud. On Kosovo, he has called for an end to "unnecessary war rhetoric" and for the full implementation of agreements on the free movement of goods and people. He supports insisting on United Nations Security Council Resolution 1244, but not on its "unenforceable" provisions such as the return of Serbian army and police to Kosovo. He has said that, after a change of government, those who took part in "destroying institutions" should face lustration, and those who committed crimes should be tried before an independent judiciary.

Party political offices
Preceded by Zoran Lutovac	President of the Democratic Party; 2024–present	Incumbent
