= Miodrag Gavrilović =

Serbian politician (born 1973)

- Миодраг Гавриловић
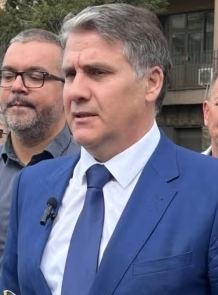
- Gavrilović in 2023

Member of the National Assembly
- In office 1 August 2022 – 6 February 2024

Personal details
- Born: 6 April 1973 (age 53) Titovo Užice, SR Serbia, SFR Yugoslavia
- Party: DS (1991–present)
- Spouse: Dragana Tomić-Gavrilović (m. 2000)
- Children: 2
- Parent: Slobodan Gavrilović (father)
- Education: University of Belgrade
- Occupation: Politician; professor
- Profession: Lawyer

Miodrag Gavrilović (Serbian Cyrillic: Миодраг Гавриловић; born 6 April 1973) is a Serbian politician. A member of the Democratic Party, he has served as one of the party's vice-presidents since 2021. He was a member of the National Assembly from 2022 to 2024.

== Early life ==
Gavrilović was born on 6 April 1973 in Titovo Užice, SR Serbia, SFR Yugoslavia. He grew up in Čajetina, though finished a gymnasium in Užice and graduated from the Faculty of Law of University of Belgrade. His father Slobodan was a high-ranking member and vice president of the Democratic Party (DS).

== Political career ==
Gavrilović has been a member of the Democratic Party since 1991. He was one of the founding members of Otpor, an organisation which played a key role in the overthrow of Slobodan Milošević. As of 2021, he has been one of the vice-presidents of DS.

Gavrilović was the candidate of the United for the Victory of Serbia coalition for the 2022 Serbian parliamentary election. He became a member of the National Assembly on 1 August 2022. On 3 June 2023, during the ongoing protests, Gavrilović was physically attacked by members of the far-right People's Patrol while defending an American journalist from them. His term ended on 6 February 2024 when the 14th National Assembly of Serbia was constituted.

== Personal life ==
He has been married to Dragana Tomić-Gavrilović since 2000, with whom he has two children. Besides his native Serbian, he speaks French and English. By profession, he is a lawyer.
