= Dragana Rakić =

Serbian politician

- Драгана Ракић

Member of the National Assembly
- Incumbent
- Assumed office 1 August 2022

Personal details
- Born: 15 August 1973 (age 53) Sremska Mitrovica, SAP Vojvodina, SR Serbia, SFR Yugoslavia
- Party: DS (2008–present)
- Education: University of Belgrade; Higher School for Sports Coaches
- Occupation: Politician

Dragana Rakić (Serbian Cyrillic: Драгана Ракић; born 15 August 1973) is a Serbian politician who has been a member of the National Assembly since 1 August 2022. She is the deputy president of the Democratic Party (DS).

== Biography ==
Rakić was born on 15 August 1973 in Sremska Mitrovica, SAP Vojvodina, SR Serbia, SFR Yugoslavia. She graduated from the Faculty of Philology, University of Belgrade at the Department of General Literature and Literary Theory in 1988. She is currently a PhD student at the same faculty. Her field of scientific research is the cultural history of South Banat.

She also graduated from the Higher School for Sports Coaches in Belgrade and earned the title of basketball coach. She was an active basketball player and basketball coach until 2008.

She is employed at the City Library in Vršac. She is the president of the board of directors of the Ljuba Davidović Foundation, member of the supervisory board of the Center for Women's Rights in Vršac, member of the Independent Association of Journalists of Vojvodina and a member of the Library Association of Serbia (BDS).

=== Political career ===
Rakić joined the Democratic Party (DS) in 2008.

She has been a member of the municipal board of DS in Vršac since 2010. She was a member of the Assembly of the City of Vršac. Since November 2014, she has been the vice president of the city board of DS in Vršac.

She was elected to the main board of the DS in 2017 and was elected vice president of DS on 2 June 2018.

In the 2022 general election, the Democratic Party contested as part of the United for the Victory of Serbia alliance and Rakić was elected to the National Assembly.

== Personal life ==
Rakić is married and has a son. She speaks English and Russian.
