= Slobodan Gavrilović =

Serbian politician (born 1951)

Slobodan Gavrilović (Serbian Cyrillic: Слободан Гавриловић; born 23 November 1951) is a Serbian politician, academic, author, and publisher. He has been a federal and republican parliamentarian and was the director of Serbia's Official Gazette from 2007 to 2012. Gavrilović is a member of the Democratic Party (Demokratska stranka, DS).

== Early life and private career ==
Gavrilović was born in the village of Prijevor in the municipality of Čačak, in what was then the People's Republic of Serbia in the People's Federal Republic of Yugoslavia. He moved to Užice in 1966 and lived in the city until 2000. He graduated in sociology from the University of Sarajevo in Bosnia and Herzegovina in 1976 and afterward began working toward a master's degree at the University of Belgrade Faculty of Philosophy. He did not complete his degree at the time, a decision he later described as a mistake; he finally received his master's in the 2000s. Beginning in 1975, he worked as a sociology teacher; he taught high school from 1980 to 2000.

He was active in the League of Communists of Serbia in his youth (when Yugoslavia was a one-party socialist state), but was expelled from the party in 1974 for supporting a group of professors in the philosophy department who had opposed changes to Yugoslavia's constitution.

Gavrilović has written several books, many concerning the life of Živojin Pavlović, a left-wing journalist from Užice who was killed by Yugoslav Partisans during the short-lived Republic of Užice in 1941. In 1990, he oversaw the republication of Pavlović's Balance of the Soviet Thermidor, an anti-Stalinist work that documented the Great Terror in the Soviet Union and was dedicated to its victims.

== Politician ==
=== Early years (1991–1993) ===
Gavrilović became a founding member of the Democratic Party with the re-introduction of multi-party politics in 1990 (although he traces the party's origins to a letter of intent signed in December 1989). He was a prominent organizer for the party in its early years and became president of its Užice board in 1990. He was the DS's candidate for the National Assembly of Serbia in Užice's first division in the 1990 parliamentary election, losing to a candidate of the Serbian Renewal Movement (Srpski pokret obnove, SPO). From 1991 to 1993, he was first secretary of the DS.

Serbian and Yugoslavian politics were dominated by Slobodan Milošević's Socialist Party of Serbia (Socijalistička partija Srbije, SPS) in the 1990s, and the DS and SPO were for many years the leading parties in opposition to Milošević's administration. Serbia adopted a system of proportional representation for parliamentary elections in 1992. Gavrilović wanted the DS to participate in the 1992 Serbian parliamentary election as part of the Democratic Movement of Serbia (Demokratski pokret Srbije, DEPOS), an alliance of opposition parties that included the SPO, but the party decided instead to contest the election on its own. Some DS members who favoured participation in DEPOS left to form the Democratic Party of Serbia (Demokratska stranka Srbije, DSS), but Gavrilović remained with the DS. He led the party's electoral list in Užice for the 1992 Serbian parliamentary election; the list did not cross the electoral threshold for assembly representation.

=== Parliamentarian (1994–1997) and after ===
Gavrilović again appeared in the lead position on the DS's list for Užice in the 1993 Serbian parliamentary election and was this time elected when the list won two mandates. He took his seat when the assembly convened in early 1994. The SPS won a plurality victory and afterward formed a coalition government with New Democracy (Nova demokratija, ND); the DS served in opposition. Gavrilović was elected to his first term as a vice-president of the DS in 1994 and was also the deputy leader of the party's assembly group.

In late 1995, Gavrilović launched an initiative to reunite the Democratic Party of Serbia into the DS. This was rejected by the DS leadership.

The DS contested the 1996 Serbian local elections in an alliance with the SPO called Together (Zajedno). The alliance won the election in Užice, but the result was nullified by the SPS and new elections ordered. Similar events in other cities led to mass protests, but Zajedno accepted the re-vote in Užice; Gavrilović defended its decision on the grounds that the local populace was not in a position to take to the streets. Zajedno ultimately won the repeat election, and Gavrilović served as a member of the city assembly for the next term.

In July 1997, Gavrilović indicated that the DS would attempt to stop the national assembly from passing a proposed new law on electoral units, which he said was intended to maximize the SPS's seat count relative to its number of voters. The law was approved, and the DS ultimately boycotted the 1997 parliamentary election.

Gavrilović emerged as a critic of DS party leader Zoran Đinđić in 1998, accusing him of inappropriately centralizing power within the party. He stood down as a party vice-president during this time. Reflecting on these events several years later, he said that there was always respect between himself and Đinđić, even when they were rivals within the party. He returned to the role of vice-president the following year.

In 1999, Gavrilović introduced a manifesto against the Milošević administration at a public rally in Užice, calling for Serbia's opposition parties to unite and overthrow the government. He continued to lead protests against Milošević into 2000.

=== Federal Parliamentarian (2000–04) ===
In 2000, the DS became a leading party in the Democratic Opposition of Serbia (Demokratska opozicija Srbije, DOS), a broad and ideologically diverse coalition of parties opposed to the Milošević administration. DOS candidate Vojislav Koštunica defeated Milošević in the 2000 Yugoslavian presidential election, a watershed moment in Serbian and Yugoslavian political life. Gavrilović appeared in the lead position on the DOS's list for Užice in the concurrent election for the Chamber of Citizens in the Yugoslavian parliament and was elected when the list won two mandates. The DOS afterward formed a coalition government in Yugoslavia with the support of delegates from Montenegro, and Gavrilović led the DOS group in the federal assembly.

The Federal Republic of Yugoslavia was re-constituted as the State Union of Serbia and Montenegro in February 2003. The new state had a unicameral legislature with members appointed by the republican parliaments of Serbia and Montenegro; in February 2003, Gavrilović was appointed as part of the DS's delegation to the new body. The Serbian parliament appointed a new federal delegation in early 2004 (following the 2003 Serbian parliamentary election), and Gavrilović's term came to an end at that time.

Following Đinđić's assassination in 2003, the DS became divided between supporters of Boris Tadić and Zoran Živković. Gavrilović supported Tadić and was re-elected as a party vice-president on Tadić's slate in 2004.

=== Return to the National Assembly (2007) ===
Gavrilović appeared in the twenty-first position the DS's electoral list in the 2007 Serbian parliamentary election and was chosen for a new term in the national assembly when the list won sixty-four seats. (After an electoral reform in 2000, all of Serbia was counted as a single electoral division in parliamentary elections. From 2000 to 2011, mandates were awarded to sponsoring parties or coalitions rather than individual candidates, and it was common practice for the mandates to be distributed out of numerical order. Gavrilović was not automatically elected by virtue of his list position, though he was awarded a mandate all the same.) The DS formed an unstable coalition government after the election with the rival Democratic Party of Serbia (Demokratska stranka Srbije, DSS) and G17 Plus, and Gavrilović served as a supporter of the administration. He was a member of the committee for constitutional affairs and the committee for culture and information. His final term in the assembly ended with his resignation on 14 November 2007.

== Director of the Official Gazette ==
Gavrilović was appointed as director of Serbia's Official Gazette (Službeni glasnik) in late 2007. In addition to its primary function of publishing the laws, regulations, and acts of the Republic of Serbia, this entity also oversees a large range of publishing in other fields. As director, Gavrilović oversaw and extension of the company's work, championing a lexicographical institute as a foundation of Serbian culture and expanding the company's work in book and magazine publication. He was replaced in 2012, after the DS fell from power and a new government led by the Serbian Progressive Party (Srpska napredna stranka, SNS) came into office. Serbian author Branko Kukić, who worked in at the Official Gazette during Gavrilović's directorship, described hiss term in office as a period of cultural flowering, which was undermined by his successor.

Following Gavrilović's departure as director, the new SNS-led administration brought a number of investigations against him which he considered as vexatious. He remarked to the new government, "I'm retired, my job now is to read and write books. Whether I do it in prison or at home, it doesn't matter, and you do your job."

== Political activity since 2012 ==
Gavrilović has remained a member of the Democratic Party through its many splits and fragmentations since 1990. In 2013, he urged the party to unite around its new leader Dragan Đilas, notwithstanding that he had not supported Đilas in the previous year's leadership contest. He later backed Đilas's unsuccessful bid for re-election as party president against Bojan Pajtić in 2014; the following year, he offered the opinion that Đilas had deliberately lost the election in order to save himself.

== Electoral record ==
=== National Assembly of Serbia ===
1990 Serbian parliamentary election: Titovo Užice 1
Candidate	Party
Zoran Bjelić	New Democracy–Movement for Serbia
Slobodan Gavrilović	Democratic Party
Balša Govedarica	Socialist Party of Serbia
Dr. Mihailo Zotović	Serbian Saint Sava Party
Predrag Jovičić	Social Democratic Party of Roma of Serbia
Mihailo Matović	Citizens' Group
Prof. Predrag Mijajlović Lune (***WINNER***)	Serbian Renewal Movement
Prof. Dr. Steven Sokić	Citizens' Group
Dušan Stojanović	Party of Independent Businessmen and Farmers
Milan Todorović	Serbian National Renewal
Total
