= Vesna Martinović =

Serbian politician

Vesna Martinović (Serbian Cyrillic: Весна Мартиновић; born 9 March 1970) is a politician in Serbia. She was the mayor of Pančevo from 2008 to 2012 and served for three terms in the National Assembly of Serbia. During her political career, Martinović was a member of the Democratic Party (Demokratska stranka, DS).

== Early life and career ==
Martinović was born in Pančevo, in what was then the Socialist Autonomous Province of Vojvodina in the Socialist Republic of Serbia, Socialist Federal Republic of Yugoslavia. She was raised in the city and graduated from the University of Belgrade Faculty of Law in 1993. She worked for the Pančevo district court and the city's municipal administration from 1994 to 1997, for Elektrodistribucija Pančevo from 1997 to 2002, and as a lawyer from 2002 to 2007.

== Politician ==
=== Parliamentarian (2007–08) and Mayor (2008–12) ===
Martinović joined the Democratic Party in 2000 and was active with the party's board in Pančevo in the early 2000s. She was given the 147th position on the party's electoral list in the 2007 Serbian parliamentary election and was awarded a mandate after the list won sixty-four seats. (From 2000 to 2011, mandates in Serbian parliamentary elections were awarded to sponsoring parties or coalitions rather than to individual candidates, and it was common practice for the mandates to be distributed out of numerical order. Martinović's position on the list – which was in any event mostly alphabetical – had no specific bearing on her chances of election.) The DS formed an unstable coalition government with the rival Democratic Party of Serbia (Demokratska stranka Srbije, DSS) and G17 Plus after the election, and Martinović served as a supporter of the administration. During her first term, she was a member of the committee for constitutional affairs and the committee for gender equality.

The DS–DSS alliance broke down in early 2008, and a new parliamentary election was called for May of that year. Martinović appeared in the 115th position on the DS-led For a European Serbia list and was given a mandate for a second term when the list won a plurality victory with 102 out of 250 mandates. She also led the DS's list for the Pančevo city assembly in the concurrent 2008 local election. The DS narrowly defeated the far-right Serbian Radical Party (Srpska radikalna stranka, SNS) in Pančevo and afterward formed a coalition government with the DSS and New Serbia (Nova Srbija, NS). Martinović was chosen as the city's mayor and resigned her parliamentary mandate in 14 July. She remained in the mayor's office for the four-year term that followed. In July 2009, she signed a major agreement with Naftna Industrija Srbije for strategic co-operation in ecology, economy, culture, and sports.

Serbia's electoral system was reformed in 2011, such that all mandates were awarded to candidates on successful lists in numerical order. Martinović again appeared in the lead position on the DS's list for Pančevo in the 2012 local elections and was re-elected to the local assembly when the list won a narrow plurality victory with nineteen out of seventy seats. A new local government was afterward formed that did not include the DS, and Martinović's term as mayor came to an end. She served in the local assembly for the term that followed and was not a candidate in the 2016 local elections.

In November 2012, Martinović was chosen as one of the Democratic Party's seven vice-presidents.

=== Return to the National Assembly (2014–16) ===
Martinović was given the twelfth position on the DS's electoral list in the 2014 parliamentary election and was elected to a third term at the republic level when the list won nineteen seats. The Serbian Progressive Party (Srpska napredna stranka, SNS) and its allies won a majority victory in the election, and the DS served in opposition. In this term, Martinović was deputy chair of the committee on administrative, budgetary, mandate, and immunity issues; a member of the committee for constitutional affairs and legislation and the committee on the rights of the child; a deputy member of the committee for justice, state administration, and local self-government; and a member of the parliamentary friendship groups with Egypt, the Republic of Macedonia (now North Macedonia), and the Netherlands.

She was given the eighteenth position on the DS's list in the 2016 parliamentary election and narrowly missed re-election when the list won sixteen mandates. Only one DS delegate left the assembly in the term that followed, and she was not given a mandate as a replacement. She has not sought a return to political life since this time.
