= Dragan Šutanovac =

Serbian politician and diplomat (born 1968)

- Драган Шутановац
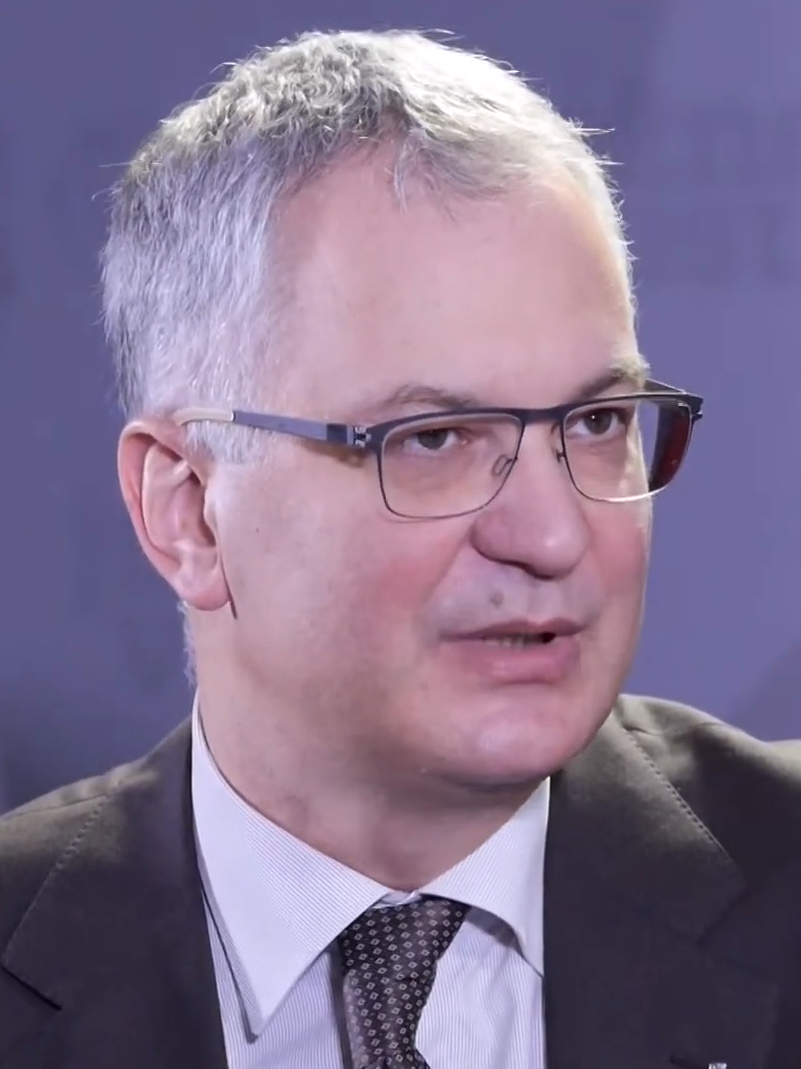
- Šutanovac in 2016

Ambassador of Serbia to the United States
- Incumbent
- Assumed office 9 May 2025
- President: Aleksandar Vučić
- Preceded by: Marko Đurić; Vladimir Marić (chargé d'affaires)

President of the Democratic Party
- In office 25 September 2016 – 11 March 2018
- Preceded by: Bojan Pajtić
- Succeeded by: Zoran Lutovac

Minister of Defence
- In office 15 May 2007 – 27 July 2012
- Prime Minister: Vojislav Koštunica; Mirko Cvetković
- Preceded by: Zoran Stanković
- Succeeded by: Aleksandar Vučić

Personal details
- Born: 24 July 1968 (age 58) Belgrade, SR Serbia, SFR Yugoslavia
- Party: Democratic Party (1997–2021)
- Spouse: Marija Ilić
- Children: 2
- Education: University of Belgrade

Dragan Šutanovac (Note: Serbian: Драган Шутановац, pronounced [drǎɡan ʃutǎːnoʋat͡s]) (born 24 July 1968) is a Serbian politician and diplomat who has been the ambassador of Serbia to the United States since 2025. A long-time member of the Democratic Party (DS), he served as minister of defence from 2007 to 2012 and as president of the DS from 2016 to 2018. After his removal from the party in 2021, he was nominated as ambassador in 2025 by the government led by the Serbian Progressive Party (SNS), the DS's main political rival.

== Early life and education ==
Šutanovac was born on 24 July 1968 in Belgrade, where he completed elementary school and the Sixth Belgrade Gymnasium. He graduated from the Faculty of Mechanical Engineering of the University of Belgrade. He later completed specialist courses in law enforcement and security oversight, and holds a diploma from the George C. Marshall European Center for Security Studies in Garmisch-Partenkirchen. In April and May 2000, he spent time at the European Parliament in Strasbourg and Brussels.

== Political career ==
=== Early career ===
Šutanovac joined the Democratic Party in 1997, during the protests against the regime of Slobodan Milošević. In September 2000, he was appointed special adviser at the Federal Ministry of the Interior, and in 2001 he became Assistant Federal Minister of the Interior. He was elected to the National Assembly in the 2000, 2003 and 2007 parliamentary elections, and chaired the Assembly's committee for defence and security from 2002 to 2003. He was also elected to the City Assembly of Belgrade in the 2000 and 2004 local elections.

=== Minister of Defence ===
Šutanovac served as Minister of Defence from 15 May 2007 to 27 July 2012, in the second cabinet of Vojislav Koštunica and the cabinet of Mirko Cvetković. His tenure was marked by the completion of the professionalisation of the Serbian Armed Forces. On 30 September 2010, the government adopted a decision suspending compulsory military service from 1 January 2011, after which only volunteers were sent to serve. Presenting the decision to the National Assembly, Šutanovac called it historic, saying it would place Serbia among states with modern armies organised to the highest standards, while parts of the opposition argued that professionalisation was a prelude to NATO membership.

His tenure has also been controversial because of the destruction of surplus weaponry during the downsizing of the army. In 2022, the Ministry of Defence stated that, on the basis of a decision by the then minister, surplus weapons and equipment had been approved for sale as scrap after being destroyed. According to the ministry, tanks were cut up and around 10,200 tonnes of scrap were sold to the Czech Republic, while 9,218 Strela-2M missiles with 420 launchers and 23,132 pieces of light weapons and small arms were also destroyed. The ruling SNS and pro-government media have for years accused Šutanovac and other officials of the former government of deliberately weakening the army, and the claim that tanks were melted down in the Smederevo steelworks became widespread, although the ministry itself stated that the tanks were not melted there. Šutanovac has repeatedly rejected the accusations, writing in Vreme in 2019 that such claims were met with "ridicule by every professional member" of the army. According to Danas, the withdrawal of 131 T-55 tanks had been decided earlier, as part of the downsizing of the army of Serbia and Montenegro.

=== President of the Democratic Party ===
In September 2016, Šutanovac was elected president of the DS, winning 59% of the delegates' votes. He resigned in March 2018, after the party failed to cross the 5% electoral threshold in the Belgrade City Assembly election, and was succeeded by Zoran Lutovac.

=== Removal from the Democratic Party ===
In November 2021, Šutanovac was removed from the DS. Srđan Milivojević, then president of the party's Executive Board, stated that Šutanovac had not been formally expelled but struck from the membership records, because he had taken part in organising what Milivojević called an illegitimate party session and internal elections in breach of the party's statute. After his removal from the party in 2021, he has not been a member of any party, and in 2025 he was nominated as ambassador by the government led by the Serbian Progressive Party (SNS), the DS's main political rival.

== Diplomatic career ==
In October 2023, Nova reported that Šutanovac was being considered for the post of ambassador to the United States, questioning whether Vučić would back him after Šutanovac's past criticism. Šutanovac said the report made him laugh, but added that if the post were offered, he would have to consider it seriously.

On 16 January 2025, the Government of Serbia, led by the Serbian Progressive Party, nominated him as ambassador to the United States. He took up the post on 9 May 2025.

== Political positions ==
Šutanovac supports Serbia's accession to the European Union and membership in NATO, arguing in 2018 that NATO membership was in the interest of Serbian citizens and asking why Serbia should be "the Cuba of the region".

== Personal life ==
Šutanovac is married to Marija, the daughter of folk singer Miroslav Ilić, with whom he has two children.

== Notes ==
Diplomatic posts
| Preceded by Marko Đurić | Ambassador of Serbia to the United States; 2025–present | Incumbent |
Political offices
| Preceded by Zoran Stanković | Minister of Defence of Serbia; 2007–2012 | Succeeded by Aleksandar Vučić |
Party political offices
| Preceded by Bojan Pajtić | President of the Democratic Party; 2016–2018 | Succeeded by Zoran Lutovac |
