= Branimir Jovančićević =

Serbian politician (born 1962)

- Бранимир Јованчићевић

Member of the National Assembly
- In office 1 August 2022 – 6 February 2024

Personal details
- Born: 15 April 1962 (age 64) Užice, PR Serbia, FPR Yugoslavia
- Party: DS (2004–2025)
- Education: University of Belgrade
- Occupation: Politician; professor

Branimir Jovančićević (Serbian Cyrillic: Бранимир Јованчићевић; born 15 April 1962) is a Serbian politician who was a member of the National Assembly from 2022 to 2024. He is also a professor at the Faculty of Chemistry of University of Belgrade.

== Early life ==
Jovančićević was born on 15 April 1962 in Užice, PR Serbia, FPR Yugoslavia. He finished primary and secondary education in his hometown, while he earned his doctorate at the University of Belgrade.

== Career ==
Jovančićević has worked at the Faculty of Chemistry of University of Belgrade since 1989. He was promoted to the position of a professor in 2003.

He has been a member of the Democratic Party since 2004. He has been the vice president of DS since 2021.

He took part in the 2022 Serbian parliamentary election on the United for the Victory of Serbia list and was successfully elected member of the National Assembly. His term ended on 6 February 2024 when the 14th National Assembly of Serbia was constituted.

== Personal life ==
He is a member of the Serbian Chemistry Society.
