= Tatjana Manojlović =

Serbian politician and journalist

- Татјана Манојловић
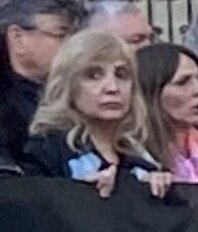
- Manojlović in 2023

Member of the National Assembly
- In office 1 August 2022 – 6 February 2024

Personal details
- Born: 6 March 1966 (age 60) Valjevo, SR Serbia, SFR Yugoslavia
- Party: DS
- Children: 2
- Education: University of Belgrade
- Occupation: Politician; journalist
- Profession: Political scientist

Tatjana Manojlović (Serbian Cyrillic: Татјана Манојловић; born 6 March 1966) is a Serbian journalist and politician. She was a member of the National Assembly of Serbia from 2022 to 2024.

== Early life ==
Manojlović was born on 6 March 1966 in Valjevo, SR Serbia, SFR Yugoslavia. She graduated from the Faculty of Political Sciences of University of Belgrade.

== Career ==
Manojlović has worked as a journalist for the Radio Television of Serbia. She is a member of the Democratic Party. She became one of the party's vice-presidents in 2021. She resigned from this position in November 2023 due to not her being featured on the electoral list for the 2023 Serbian parliamentary election. Her term ended on 6 February 2024 when the 14th National Assembly of Serbia was constituted.

Manojlović was a candidate of the United for the Victory of Serbia coalition for the 2022 Serbian parliamentary election. She became a member of the National Assembly on 1 August 2022.

== Personal life ==
By profession, Manojlović is a political scientist. She has two children.
