= Nenad Mitrović (Democratic Party politician) =

Serbian politician

- Ненад Митровић

Member of the National Assembly
- Incumbent
- Assumed office 1 August 2022

President of the Municipality of Vladičin Han
- In office 2008–2012

Personal details
- Born: 30 September 1970 (age 56) Vranje, SR Serbia, SFR Yugoslavia
- Party: DS
- Education: Faculty of Veterinary Medicine
- Occupation: Politician

Nenad Mitrović (Serbian Cyrillic: Ненад Митровић; born 30 September 1970) is a Serbian politician who has been a member of the National Assembly of Serbia since 1 August 2022. A member of the Democratic Party, he has been one of the party's vice-presidents since 2021.

== Early life ==
Mitrović was born on 30 September 1970 in Vranje, SR Serbia, SFR Yugoslavia. He finished primary and secondary education in Vladičin Han and graduated from the Faculty of Veterinary Medicine in Belgrade.

== Career ==
Mitrović is a member of the Democratic Party. He was the president of the municipality of Vladičin Han from 2008 to 2012.

He became one of the party's vice-presidents in 2021. He was a candidate of the United for the Victory of Serbia coalition for the 2022 Serbian parliamentary election. He became a member of the National Assembly on 1 August 2022.
