= Zoran Lutovac =

Serbian politician and political scientist (born 1964)

- Зоран Лутовац
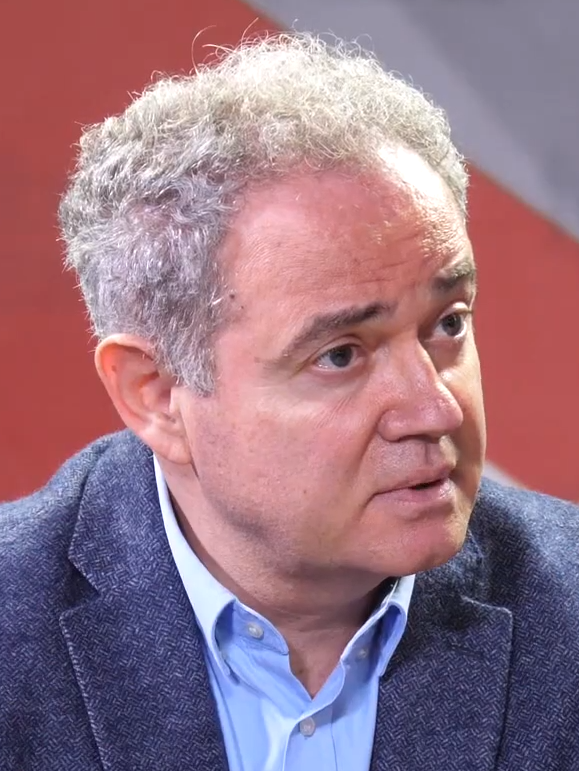
- Lutovac in 2020

Member of the National Assembly
- Incumbent
- Assumed office 1 August 2022

Vice President of the National Assembly
- In office 2 August 2022 – 6 February 2024

President of the Democratic Party
- In office 2 June 2018 – 14 December 2024
- Preceded by: Dragan Šutanovac
- Succeeded by: Srđan Milivojević

Ambassador of Serbia to Montenegro
- In office 2008–2013
- President: Boris Tadić; Tomislav Nikolić
- Prime Minister: Mirko Cvetković; Ivica Dačić
- Preceded by: Position established
- Succeeded by: Zoran Bingulac

Personal details
- Born: 7 August 1964 (age 62) Belgrade, SR Serbia, SFR Yugoslavia
- Party: Democratic Party (1996–present)
- Education: University of Belgrade

Zoran Lutovac (Serbian: Зоран Лутовац; born 7 August 1964) is a Serbian politician, political scientist and former diplomat. He was the president of the Democratic Party (DS) from 2018 to 2024 and the ambassador of Serbia to Montenegro from 2008 to 2013. He has been a member of the National Assembly since 2022, and served as one of its vice-presidents from 2022 to 2024.

== Early life and education ==
Lutovac was born on 7 August 1964 in Belgrade. His father was from Berane in Montenegro. He finished elementary and high school in Belgrade and graduated from the University of Belgrade Faculty of Political Sciences in 1988, where he also obtained a magister degree in 1994.

== Career ==
Lutovac lectured at the Faculty of Political Sciences in Belgrade and at several other universities. From 2001 to 2004, he was a member of the board of directors of Zavod za udžbenike, the state publisher of school textbooks, and president of the board of directors of the Belgrade Institute for European Studies. He was a political adviser to Prime Minister Zoran Đinđić, served on several government committees during the Đinđić and Živković cabinets, and advised Dragoljub Mićunović in his campaign for the 2003 presidential election. From 2008 to 2013, he was Serbia's ambassador to Montenegro.

=== Democratic Party ===
Lutovac joined the Democratic Party in 1996. He chaired the party's committee for national minorities from 1997 to 2003 and its committee for human and minority rights from 2004 to 2008. He was a member of the party's Political Council from 1997 to 2008 and again from 2013, becoming its chairman in 2016. He ran for party president in 2016, but lost to Dragan Šutanovac. After Šutanovac resigned, Lutovac was elected president of the party on 2 June 2018, and was re-elected in 2021.

In the 2022 parliamentary election, the DS ran as part of the United for the Victory of Serbia coalition, and Lutovac was elected to the National Assembly. At the Assembly's constitutive session in August 2022, he was elected one of its vice-presidents. He was re-elected in the December 2023 election, 37th on the Serbia Against Violence list.

Lutovac stood for re-election as party president at the DS assembly on 14 December 2024, but was eliminated in the first round with 83 votes. Srđan Milivojević went on to win the second round against Miodrag Gavrilović.

=== Later career ===
Lutovac remained a DS member of the National Assembly after losing the party presidency. Ahead of the 2026 Serbian parliamentary election, he backed the Student List, saying in May 2026 that for the first time since coming to power in 2012, Aleksandar Vučić was not running as a clear favourite. In August 2026, he joined the parliamentary group "MPs with the Students: For Election Control", formed on the DS's initiative to secure more seats on polling boards for the list. He attended the rally in Belgrade on 14 September 2026 held before the list was submitted to the Republic Electoral Commission, describing it as a "winning" gathering.

== Political positions ==
Lutovac has described the DS under his leadership as a pro-European social-democratic party, and regards EU membership as Serbia's foreign-policy priority. Following the Russian invasion of Ukraine in 2022, he condemned the invasion and supported sanctions against those responsible, and was among the few Serbian party leaders to openly advocate sanctions against Russia during the 2022 election campaign. He argued that Serbian sanctions would carry only symbolic weight, neither particularly harming Russia nor helping the EU, but would show whether Serbia considered the EU its priority. He has said that under his leadership the DS became a party that would neither "sell out" nor act as a "constructive opposition" to what he called a criminalised regime.

Diplomatic posts
Preceded by Position established	Ambassador of Serbia to Montenegro; 2008–2013	Succeeded by Zoran Bingulac
Party political offices
Preceded by Dragan Šutanovac	President of the Democratic Party; 2018–2024	Succeeded by Srđan Milivojević
