= Balša Božović (politician) =

Serbian politician

Balša Božović MP
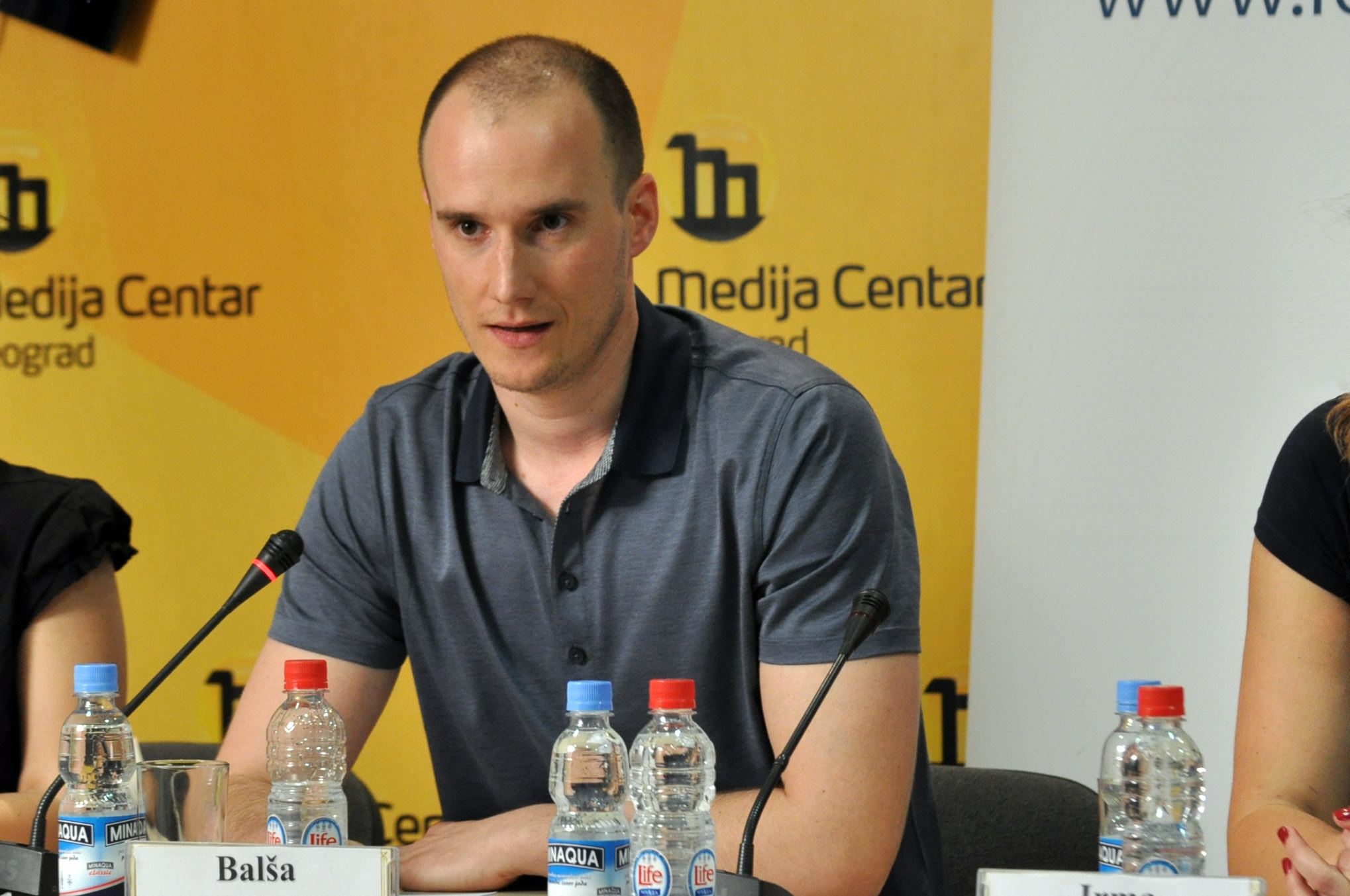

President of the DS branch for the city of Belgrade
- In office 8 Jun 2013 – 7 March 2018
- Preceded by: Aleksandar Šapić

President of Democratic Youth
- In office 21 Jun 2009 – 23 July 2013
- Preceded by: Milan Vučković
- Succeeded by: Jovana Jovanović

Assembly Councilor of the City of Belgrade
- In office 19 August 2008 – 6 May 2012

Personal details
- Born: 10 May 1983 (age 43) Belgrade
- Party: Democratic Party (2004–2020)
- Education: Univ. of Belgrade
- Occupation: Lawyer

Balša Božović (Serbian Cyrillic: Балша Божовић; born 10 May 1983 in Belgrade) is a Serbian politician, member of Democratic Party, and he was President of Democratic Youth from 21 Jun, 2009 until 23 July 2013. He was the president of the DS branch for the city of Belgrade until March 2018.

== Biography ==
Born in Belgrade. He is a lawyer. Member of the Democratic Party since 2004. Since 2005, leader of the Democratic Youth responsible for the DY in Kosovo and Metohija. Campaign coordinator from 2003 to 2008. President of the Belgrade Youth from 2007 to 2009. City Councillor since 2008. Deputy head of Democratic Party caucus in the Assembly of the Republic of Serbia since July 2012.

As a volunteer of the National Office of the President of the Republic, he worked in the department of property relations. Student Representative at the University of Belgrade since 2005. Member of Council of the Faculty of Law 2005-2006. He is a founder of the "Youth Coalition Against Violence" (2009), the NGO “There is no alternative to Europe” (2008) and the NGO "Human Thing" (2007)

The student of the Centre for Modern Skills (CMV) on skills Political 2005th He attended a course NDI "Effective communication" (May–September 2006.) The participants of the Center for Democracy - the theme NATO (2009). Attended school "Politea" (2009). Attended annual seminar BeFPE 200910th The student FES Seminar - Banjaluka 2010th
