= Dušan Vukajlović =

Serbian poet

- Born: 20 January 1948; Pančevo, FPR Yugoslavia
- Died: 9 December 1994 (aged 46); Belgrade, Serbia, FR Yugoslavia
- Resting place: Saint Pantelejmon Serbian Orthodox Church, Trebinje
- Occupation(s): Poet, author and secretary

Dušan Vukajlović (Serbian Cyrillic: Душан Вукајловић; 20 January 1948 – 9 December 1994) was a Serbian poet, author and long-time secretary of the Association of Writers of Serbia.

He was one of thirteen founding members of Serbia's Democratic Party in December 1989 which was the first non-communist opposition party in Serbia since 1945.
