= Gojko Đogo =

Serbian poet

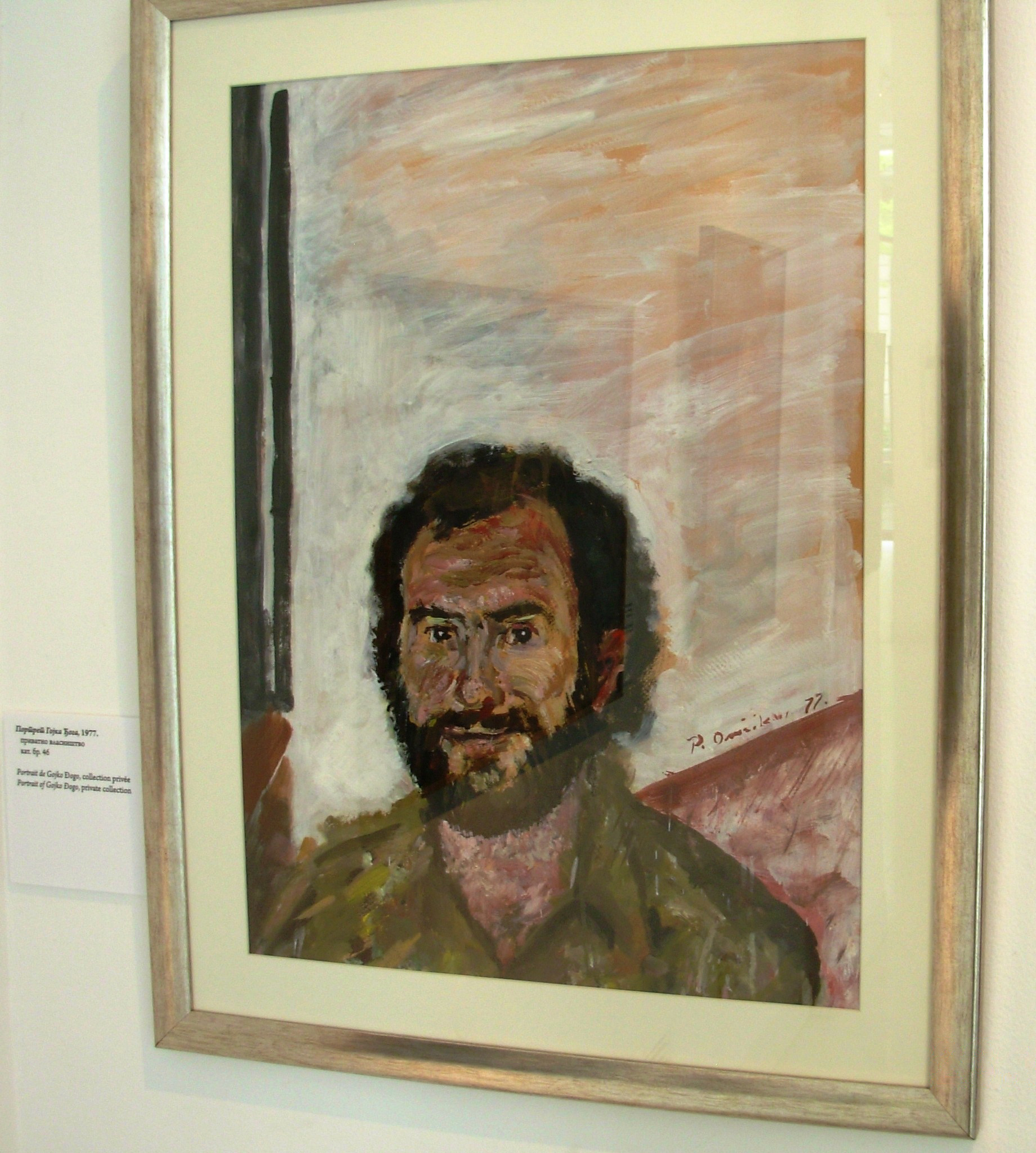
- Đogo painted by Petar Omčikus in 1977
- Born: 21 November 1940 (age 84); Vlahovići, Ljubinje, Kingdom of Yugoslavia
- Occupation(s): Poet and writer

Gojko Đogo (Serbian Cyrillic: Гојко Ђого; born 21 November 1940) is a Serb poet.

A dissident, he was imprisoned in SFR Yugoslavia during the 1980s on the basis of verbal offence for "defaming the memory of Josip Broz Tito".

In December 1989, he was one of the founders of the Democratic Party in, Serbia. Đogo is a member of the Academy of Sciences and Arts of the Republika Srpska (ANURS).

In October 1991, a phone conversation between Đogo and Radovan Karadžić was recorded, in which Karadžić says that around 300,000 Muslims living in Sarajevo may be killed in the upcoming war, and Đogo is heard commenting "They should all be slaughtered. All of them."

== Works ==
- Tuga pingvina, 1967
- Kukuta,1978
- Vunena vremena, 1982
- Izabrane i nove pesme, 1986
- Crno runo, 2002
