= Democratic Youth (Serbia) =

Youth wing of the Democratic Party

Democratic Youth Демократска омладина Demokratska omladina
- Chairperson: Stefan Ninić
- Founded: 12 May 1990
- Headquarters: Belgrade, Serbia
- Ideology: Social democracy Progressivism
- Mother party: Democratic Party
- International affiliation: International Union of Socialist Youth
- European affiliation: Young European Socialists
- Website: omladina.ds.org.rs

Democratic Youth (Serbian Cyrillic: Демократска омладина, romanized: Demokratska omladina) is the youth organization of the Democratic Party (DS). The current chairperson of the Democratic Youth is Stefan Ninić.

It was formed on 12 May 1990. It is an organization of young members of DS up to 30 years old.

== Membership ==
In 2011, the Democratic Party had over 40,000 members younger than 30. Every member of the DS who is younger than 30 years old, may become a member of the Democratic Youth.
