= Bojan Pajtić =

Serbian lawyer and politician (born 1970)

- Бојан Пајтић
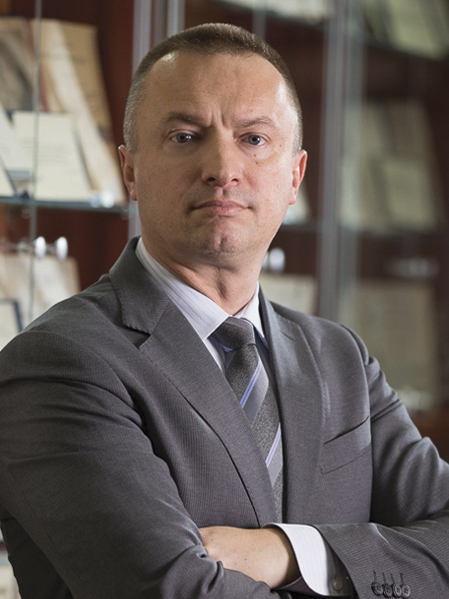

President of the Democratic Party
- In office 31 May 2014 – 24 September 2016
- Preceded by: Dragan Đilas
- Succeeded by: Dragan Šutanovac

President of the Government of Vojvodina
- In office 14 December 2009 – 20 June 2016
- Preceded by: Post established
- Succeeded by: Igor Mirović

7th Chairman of the Executive Council of Vojvodina
- In office 30 October 2004 – 14 December 2009
- Preceded by: Đorđe Đukić
- Succeeded by: Post abolished

Personal details
- Born: 2 May 1970 (age 56) Senta, SAP Vojvodina, SR Serbia, SFR Yugoslavia
- Party: Democratic Party (1996–present)
- Spouse: Vesna Pajtić
- Children: 2
- Education: University of Novi Sad
- Occupation: Lawyer; university professor; politician

Bojan Pajtić (Serbian: Бојан Пајтић; born 2 May 1970) is a Serbian lawyer, university professor and former politician. A member of the Democratic Party (DS), he headed the government of Vojvodina from 2004 to 2016, first as chairman of the Executive Council and, from 2009, as president of the Government of Vojvodina, and was president of the DS from 2014 to 2016. Since withdrawing from active politics, he has been a professor at the University of Novi Sad Faculty of Law and a frequent critic of the government of Aleksandar Vučić.

== Early life and education ==
Pajtić was born on 2 May 1970 in Senta. He completed primary and secondary school in Senta, and graduated from the Faculty of Law of the University of Novi Sad in 1995. He obtained a doctorate in law in 2008, and completed specialist studies at Heidelberg University.

== Academic career ==
Pajtić became a teaching assistant at the Faculty of Law in Novi Sad in 1996. He was appointed assistant professor in 2009, associate professor in 2014 and full professor in 2019. He has published a number of academic papers in law journals.

== Political career ==
=== Early career ===
Pajtić joined the Democratic Party in 1996. Some of his biographies stated that he had entered the DS as a member of Milan Paroški's People's Party, which merged into the DS that year. Pajtić has denied this, saying that it was his father who briefly sat on that party's presidency while it was being founded. He became spokesperson of the DS city board in Novi Sad, and from March to December 2003 chaired the "DOS – Reforms of Serbia" parliamentary group in the National Assembly.

=== Head of the government of Vojvodina ===
On 30 October 2004, Pajtić was elected chairman of the Executive Council of Vojvodina, succeeding Đorđe Đukić. After the adoption of the province's new statute, the Executive Council was replaced by the Government of Vojvodina, and Pajtić became its first president on 14 December 2009. He held the post until 20 June 2016, when he was succeeded by Igor Mirović of the Serbian Progressive Party following the 2016 provincial election.

=== President of the Democratic Party ===
At an extraordinary party congress on 31 May 2014, Pajtić was elected president of the DS, defeating the incumbent Dragan Đilas. In June 2016, he proposed that the party's electoral assembly hold an internal referendum on several questions, the most prominent being whether the DS should support Serbia's accession to NATO. In the party's first direct leadership election on 24 September 2016, he finished third with 16% of the vote, behind Dragan Šutanovac (59%) and Zoran Lutovac, and Šutanovac succeeded him as president.

=== Later activity ===
After withdrawing from active politics, Pajtić returned to teaching at the Faculty of Law in Novi Sad and became a frequent commentator on Serbian politics and a critic of Vučić, particularly on social media. During the campaign for the 2026 Serbian parliamentary election, the pro-government tabloid Informer and other media close to the government claimed that Pajtić was the informal leader of the Student List and had shaped its candidate list. Vučić repeated the claim, saying that Pajtić and Dušan Petrović stood behind the list's leaders. Pajtić rejected the claims as lies, stating that none of his friends, relatives or party colleagues were on the list, that he had learned of its composition from the media, and that the accusations were aimed at portraying the students as "pawns" who did not think for themselves.

== Political positions ==
Pajtić is a supporter of Serbia's accession to the European Union, and as DS president he pushed the party to take a position on NATO membership. On Kosovo, he argued in 2023 that by accepting the EU-backed agreement on the normalisation of relations, Vučić had effectively recognised Kosovo's independence even without signing it. He pointed to provisions under which Serbia would not oppose Kosovo's membership in international organisations and would exchange permanent missions.

== Personal life ==
Pajtić is married to Vesna Pajtić, with whom he has two children. Besides his native Serbian, he speaks Hungarian and English.

In late October 2026, shocking allegations surfaced in Serbian media as purported explicit videos allegedly involving Bojan Pajtić, his wife, and an unidentified man began circulating online. The footage was also claimed to show sexual activity and the use of hard drugs.

Political offices
| Preceded by Đorđe Đukić | Chairman of the Executive Council of Vojvodina; 2004–2009 | Succeeded by Post abolished |
| Preceded by Post established | President of the Government of Vojvodina; 2009–2016 | Succeeded by Igor Mirović |
Party political offices
| Preceded by Dragan Đilas | President of the Democratic Party; 2014–2016 | Succeeded by Dragan Šutanovac |
