= Persida Nenadović =

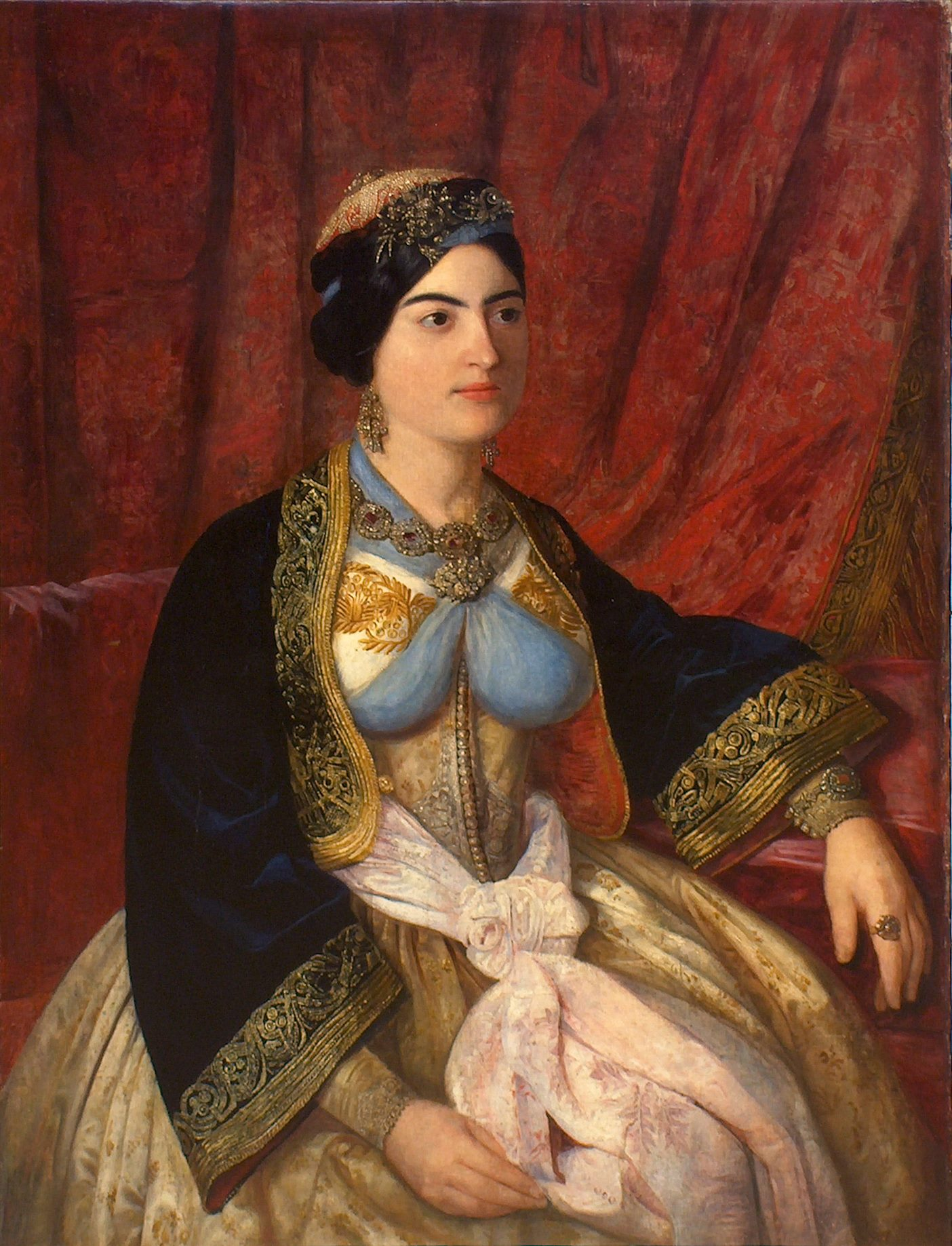
- Portrait by Katarina Ivanović, 1847

Princess consort of Serbia
- Tenure: 14 September 1842 – 24 October 1858
- Born: 15 February 1813; Brankovina, Revolutionary Serbia
- Died: 29 March 1873 (aged 60); Vienna, Austria-Hungary
- Burial: Church of St. George, Oplenac
- Spouse: Alexander Karađorđević, Prince of Serbia (m. 1830)
- Issue: Princess Poleksija; Princess Kleopatra; Prince Aleksij; Svetozar, Hereditary Prince of Serbia; Peter I of Serbia; Princess Jelena; Prince Andrej; Princess Jelisaveta; Prince Đorđe; Prince Arsen
- Father: Jevrem Nenadović
- Mother: Jovanka Milovanović
- Religion: Serbian Orthodox

Persida Karađorđević née Nenadović (Serbian Cyrillic: Персида Ненадовић; 15 February 1813 – 29 March 1873) was the Princess of Serbia as the wife of Alexander Karađorđević, who ruled the Principality of Serbia from his election on 14 September 1842 until his abdication on 24 October 1858. She was the mother of ten children, including future king Peter I of Serbia, who succeeded to the throne after the assassination of King Alexander I, the last ruler of the Obrenović dynasty (the traditional rivals of the Karađorđevićs).

== Life ==
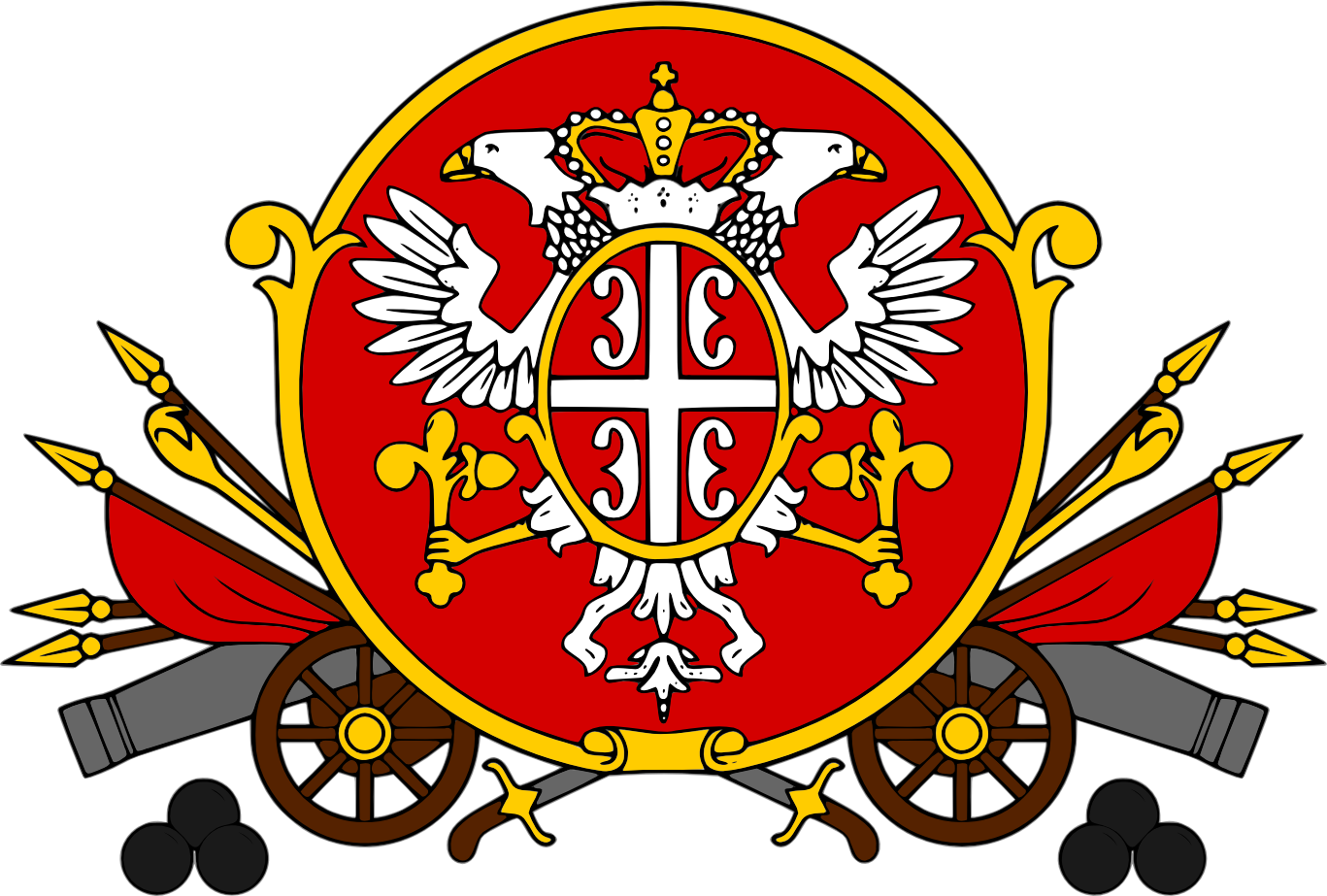
Coat of arms of the Nenadović family

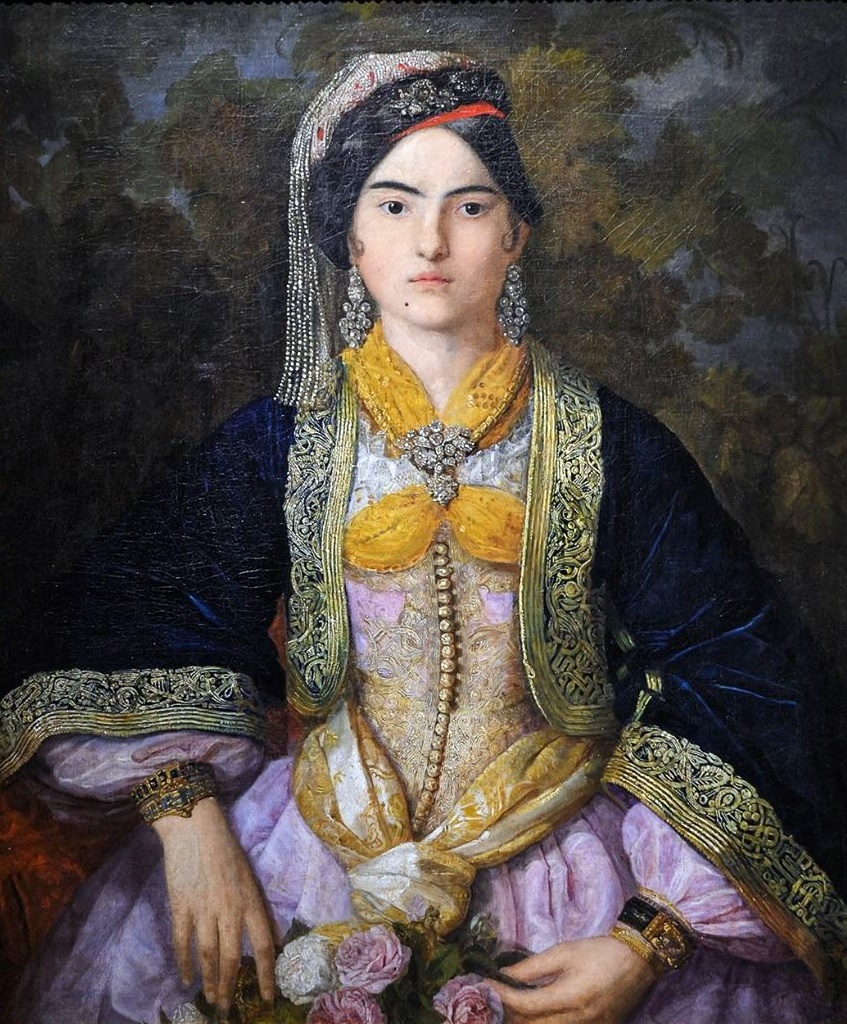
Anka Nenadović (1820-1843), sister of Princess Persida, mother of Petar Topalović, painted in 1837 by Katarina Ivanović

Persida was born on 15 February 1813 in Brankovina, Ottoman Empire (now Serbia), into Nenadović family, at that time the most powerful family in Serbia. She was the daughter of Voivode Jevrem Nenadović (1793–1867) and Jovanka Milovanović (1792–1880). Her paternal grandfather was Jakov Nenadović, the first Serbian Interior Minister of Revolutionary Serbia, while her maternal grandfather Mladen Milovanović was the first Minister of Defence.

On 1 June 1830 in Hotin, Bessarabia, at the age of 17, she married Alexander Karađorđević (1806-1885), the youngest son of Karađorđe Petrović and his wife, Jelena Jovanović (1771-1842). They moved to Serbia in 1839 and Alexander joined the Headquarters of the Serbian Army.

On 14 September 1842, Alexander was elected as Prince of Serbia, succeeding the deposed Prince Miloš Obrenović, and himself becoming the first Karađorđević ruler. From that date until his own abdication, Persida was styled Princess of Serbia, while in exile, she was styled Princess Karađorđević.

In 1858, Prince Alexander came into conflict with members of the Council, with the result that he was compelled to abdicate in favor of Miloš Obrenović, who returned to power for the second time. Following Alexander's abdication, she and her family retired to Timișoara. She gave birth to a total of 10 children, six of whom lived to adulthood.

She died on 29 March 1873 at the age of 60 in Vienna. In 1912, their son King Peter ordered the remains of Princess Persida and Prince Alexander to be moved to the Church of St. George in Oplenac.

The actress Catherine Oxenberg is one of Persida's many descendants.

For her charitable work and cultural activities, Turkish Sultan awarded her the Order of the Padishah Portrait in 1864. She participated in establishing the first Serbian theater in 1847. She also organized frequent art promotion gatherings that were quite significant for the life of the Serbian capital.

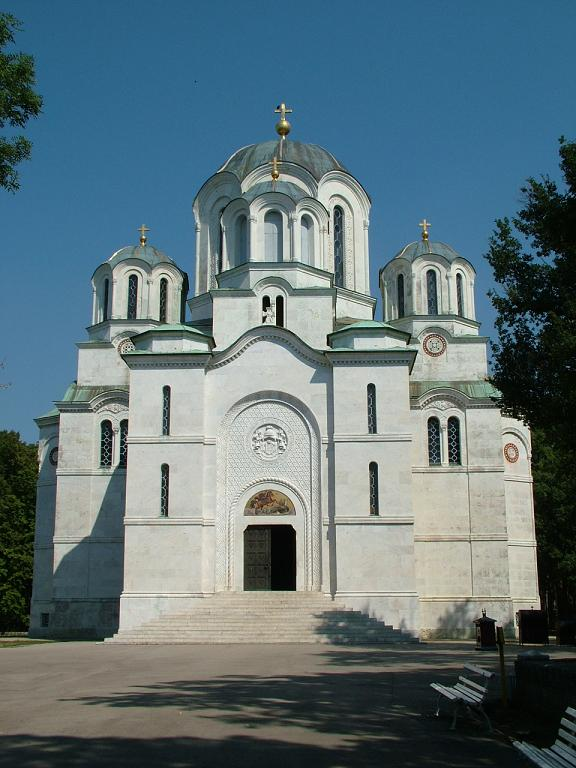
Church of St. George, in Oplenac, burial place of Princess Persida, and many members of her family

=== Issue ===
The children of Alexander and Persida:

- Princess Poleksija (1 February 1833 – 5 December 1914), married firstly in 1849 Konstantin Nikolajević (1821 – suicide 13 October 1877), Minister of the Interior of Serbia, by whom she had issue; secondly Dr Alexander Preshern (1830 – 2 December 1914).
- Princess Kleopatra (26 November 1835 – 13 July 1855), married in 1855 Milan Avram Petronijević, Serbian Ambassador to Russia.
- Prince Aleksij (23 March 1836 – 21 April 1841)
- Prince Svetozar (1841 – 17 March 1847)
- Prince Peter (29 June 1844 – 16 August 1921), ruled Serbia from 1903 until 1918, and subsequently as King of the Kingdom of Serbs, Croats, and Slovenes until his death; married Princess Zorka of Montenegro, by whom he had issue.
- Princess Jelena (18 October 1846 – 26 July 1867), married in 1867 Đorđe Simić (28 February 1843 – 11 October 1921), Prime Minister of Serbia.
- Prince Andrej (15 September 1848 – 12 July 1864)
- Princess Jelisaveta (born and died 1850)
- Prince Đorđe (11 October 1856 – 5 January 1889)
- Prince Arsenije (16 April 1859 – 1938), married in 1892, Princess Aurora of San Donato. They were the parents of Prince Paul, Regent of Yugoslavia.

== See also ==
- List of Serbian consorts

Royal titles
Preceded by Ljubica Vukomanović	Princess consort of Serbia; 14 September 1842 – 24 October 1858	Succeeded by Julia Hunyadi
