= Jevrem Nenadović =

Serbian politician (1793–1867)

Vojvoda Jevrem Nenadović Јеврем Ненадовић
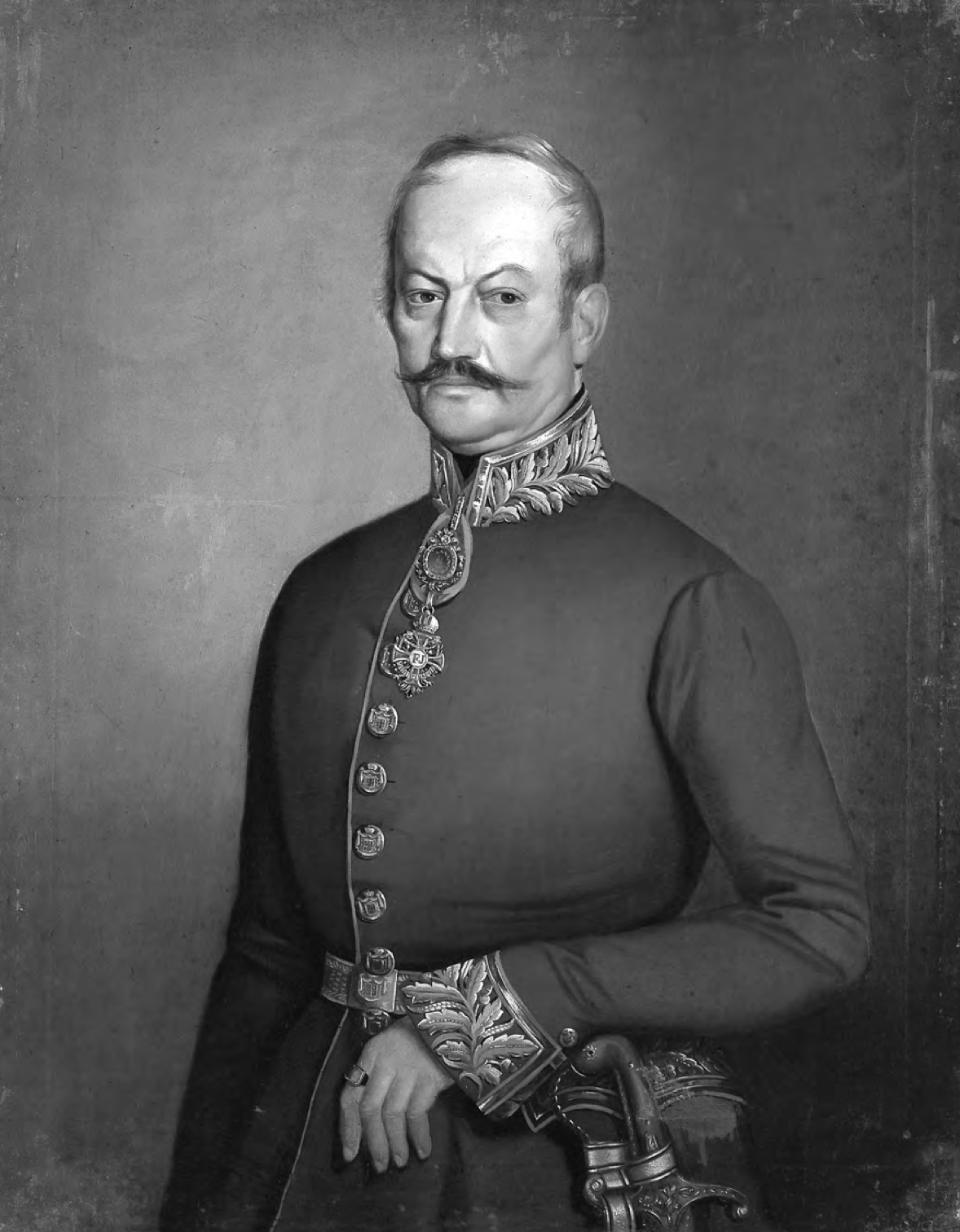
- Portrait of Jevrem Nenadović by Uroš Knežević, National Museum of Serbia
- Born: 27 September 1793; Brankovina, Sanjak of Smederevo, Ottoman Empire
- Died: 6 April 1867 (aged 73); Belgrade, Principality of Serbia
- Military career
- Allegiance: Revolutionary Serbia; Principality of Serbia
- Conflicts: First Serbian Uprising
- Awards: Order of Glory; Order of Franz Joseph

Jevrem Nenadović (Serbian Cyrillic: Јеврем Ненадовић; 27 September 1793 – 6 April 1867) was a Serbian voivode and politician. He was the President of the Court in Valjevo, and State Counselor in Belgrade.

== Biography ==
Jevrem Nenadović was born in Brankovina near Valjevo, at the time part of the Sanjak of Smederevo (Belgrade Pashaluk) into the notable Nenadović family. He was the son of Jakov Nenadović (1765–1836) and Nerandža, nephew of Aleksa Nenadović (1749–1804), and cousin of Mateja Nenadović (1777–1854).

As a young man, he was appointed the vojvoda of Tamnava, protecting the border from Soko and the Drina, during the First Serbian Uprising. He was a member of the Serbian Learned Society.

He married Jovanka "Joka" Milovanović, the only daughter of Mladen Milovanović (1760–1823) by his first wife, Bosiljka Milovanović. His daughter Persida (1813–1873) married Alexander Karađorđević, Prince of Serbia (r. 1842–58). His grandson was the King Peter I of Serbia.

== Issue ==
Jevrem Nenadović married Jovanka "Joka" Milovanović, the only daughter of Mladen Milovanović (1760–1823). They had five daughters and two sons:

- Persida (1813–1873), married Alexander Karađorđević, Prince of Serbia (r. 1842–58)
- Anka (1820–1843), married Milosav Topalović
- Mašinka (1823–1898), married Jovan Lukačević
- Mladen J. (1834–1868), married Sofija Barlovac
- Simeon "Sima" (1838–1868)
- Jelisaveta (?), married Jevrem Gavrilović
- Bosiljka (?), married Radovan Đurić

== See also ==
- List of Serbian Revolutionaries

== Sources ==
- Milićević, Milan (1888). Поменик знаменитих људи у српскога народа новијега доба. Srpska kraljevska štamparija. pp. 407–408. ( Public domain)
