= Alexander Karađorđević, Prince of Serbia =

Prince of Serbia from 1842 to 1858

Alexander
- Prince of Serbia
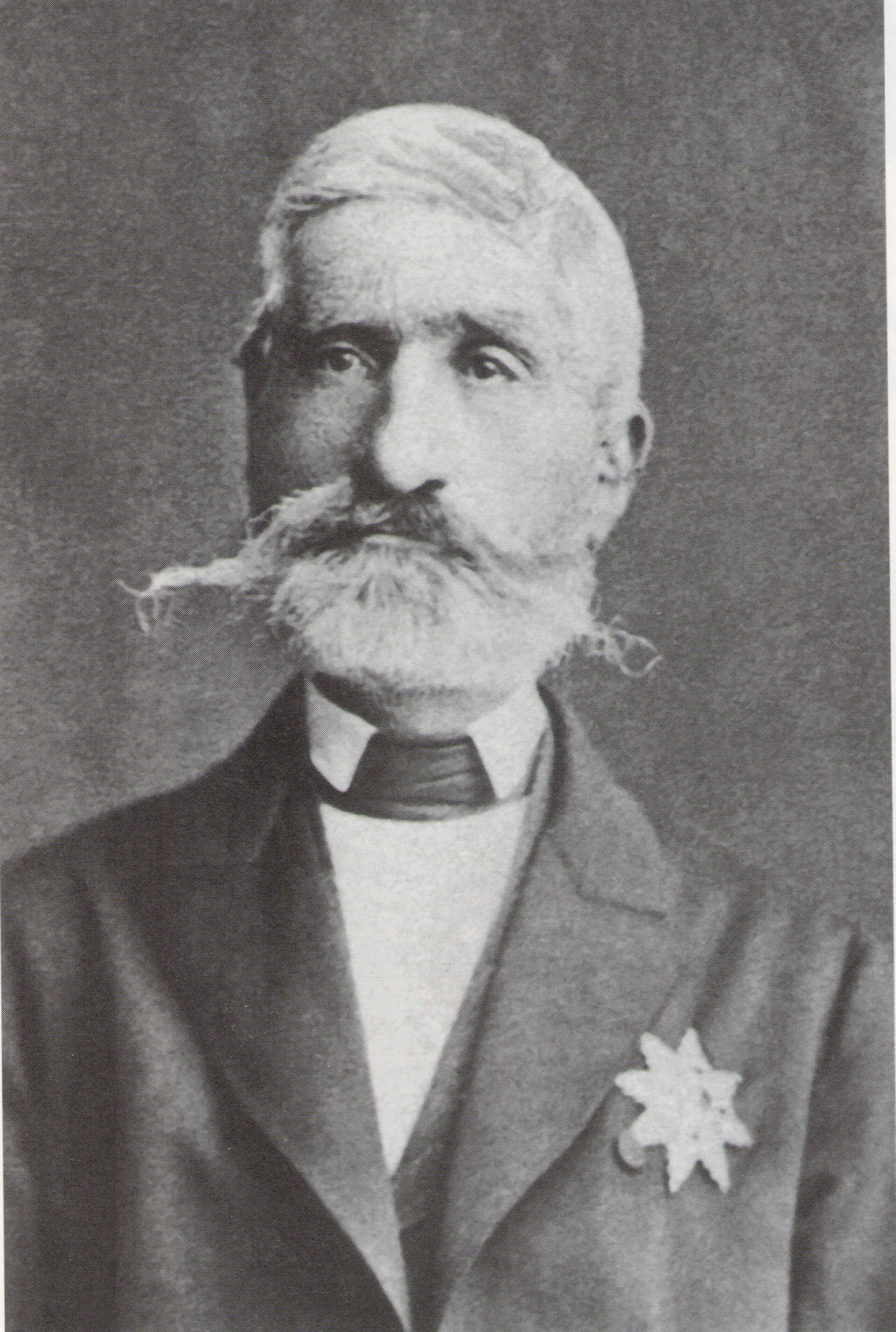

Prince of Serbia
- Reign: 14 September 1842 – 23 December 1858
- Predecessor: Mihailo Obrenović III
- Successor: Miloš Obrenović I
- Born: 11 October 1806; Topola, Revolutionary Serbia
- Died: 3 May 1885 (aged 78); Timișoara, Austria-Hungary
- Burial: Oplenac
- Spouse: Persida Nenadović (m. 1830; died 1873)
- Issue Among others: Prince Aleksij; Svetozar, Hereditary Prince of Serbia; Peter I of Serbia; Prince Andrej; Prince Đorđe; Prince Arsen
- House: Karađorđević
- Father: Karađorđe
- Mother: Jelena Jovanović
- Religion: Serbian Orthodox

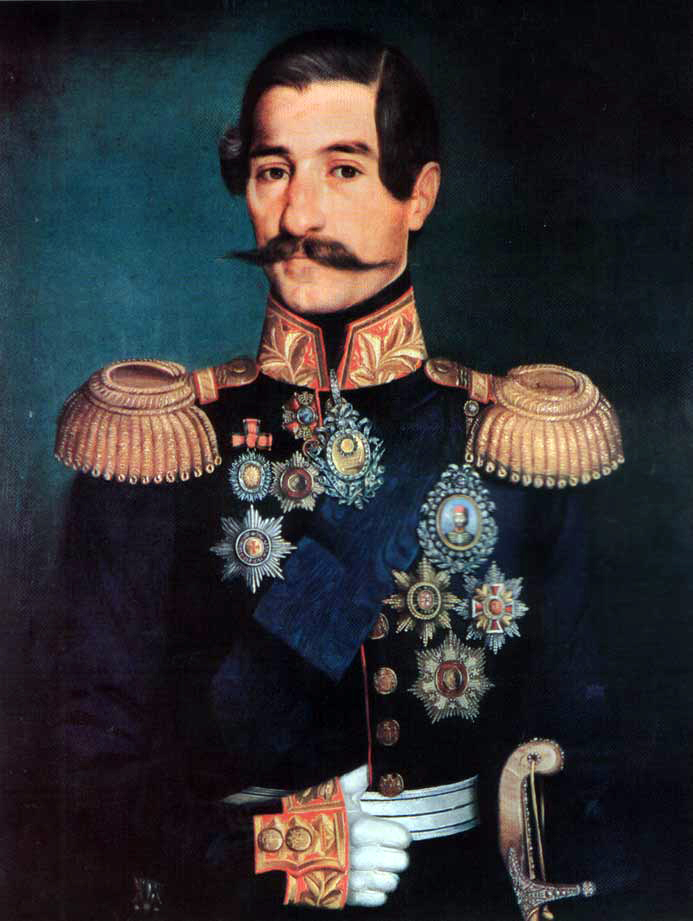
Prince Alexander of Serbia, painted by Uroš Knežević

Alexander Karađorđević (Serbian Cyrillic: Александар Карађорђевић, romanized: Aleksandar Karađorđević; 11 October 1806 – 3 May 1885) was the reigning prince of Serbia between 1842 and 1858 and a member of the House of Karađorđević.

== Early life ==
The youngest son of Karađorđe Petrović and his wife, Jelena Jovanović, was born in Topola on 11 October 1806. He was educated in Khotyn, Bessarabia, under the patronage of the Russian Tsar.

After the Sultan's decree acknowledging the title of Prince Mihailo Obrenović at the end of 1839, the family returned to Serbia. Alexander joined the Headquarters of the Serbian Army, and was promoted to the rank of Lieutenant and appointed as adjutant to Prince Mihailo.

== Prince of Serbia ==
After the political conflicts caused by disrespect of the so-called "Turkish constitution," and Miloš Obrenović's and then Mihailo Obrenović's abdications, Aleksandar Karađorđević was elected the Prince of Serbia at the National Assembly in Vračar, a municipality in modern Belgrade, on 14 September 1842. Having had his title acknowledged by Russia and Turkey, Prince Aleksandar started the reforms and founded a number of new institutions in order to improve the progress of the Serbian state. He implemented the code of civil rights, introduced the regular Army, built a cannon foundry, improved the existing schools and founded new ones, as well as established the National Library and National Museum.

It was Councillor Lazar Arsenijević Batalaka who, in 1845 introduced Ilija Garašanin to Prince Aleksandar.

During the Hungarian Revolution in Vojvodina, in 1848, Prince Aleksandar Karađorđević sent Serbian volunteers under the command of Stevan Knićanin to help the Serbs’ struggle for autonomy. As a follow-up of the national-political movements of 1848, the pan-slavistic idea of a Yugoslav Monarchy emerged. The "Načertanije" (the "Draft") document, written as a Serbian political program by Ilija Garašanin four years earlier, made the mission of replacing the Austrian and Turkish domination of all Southern Slavs with the Serbian rule under the banner of "Serbia."

Throughout his reign, Prince Alexander was troubled with Obrenović plots. By his refusal to take part in the Crimean War as an ally of the French, British and Ottoman Empires against the Russian Empire. The result was his overthrow and departure into exile in 1858 by the winners of the Powers in the war and bringing the rival Obrenović dynasty to the throne of the Principality of Serbia.

He was awarded the Ottoman Order of Glory and Order of Distinction.

=== Abdication ===
The popularity of the pro-russian Prince Alexander Karađorđević, declined dramatically after the Treaty of Paris left Serbia with no concessions at the end of the Crimean War. The Assembly voted upon his deposition on December 23, 1858, and Miloš Obrenović, who had previously been Prince of Serbia was recalled. In contrast to the pro-Austrian policies of his predecessor, Obrenović stood firm against both Turkey and Austria. He managed to pressure the Assembly to grant the House of Obrenović succession to the Serbian throne.

Prince Alexander died in Timișoara on 3 May 1885. He was buried in Vienna, and his earthly remains were moved in 1912 to the Memorial Church of St. George built by his son Petar I Karađorđević, in Oplenac, Serbia.

== Marriage and issue ==
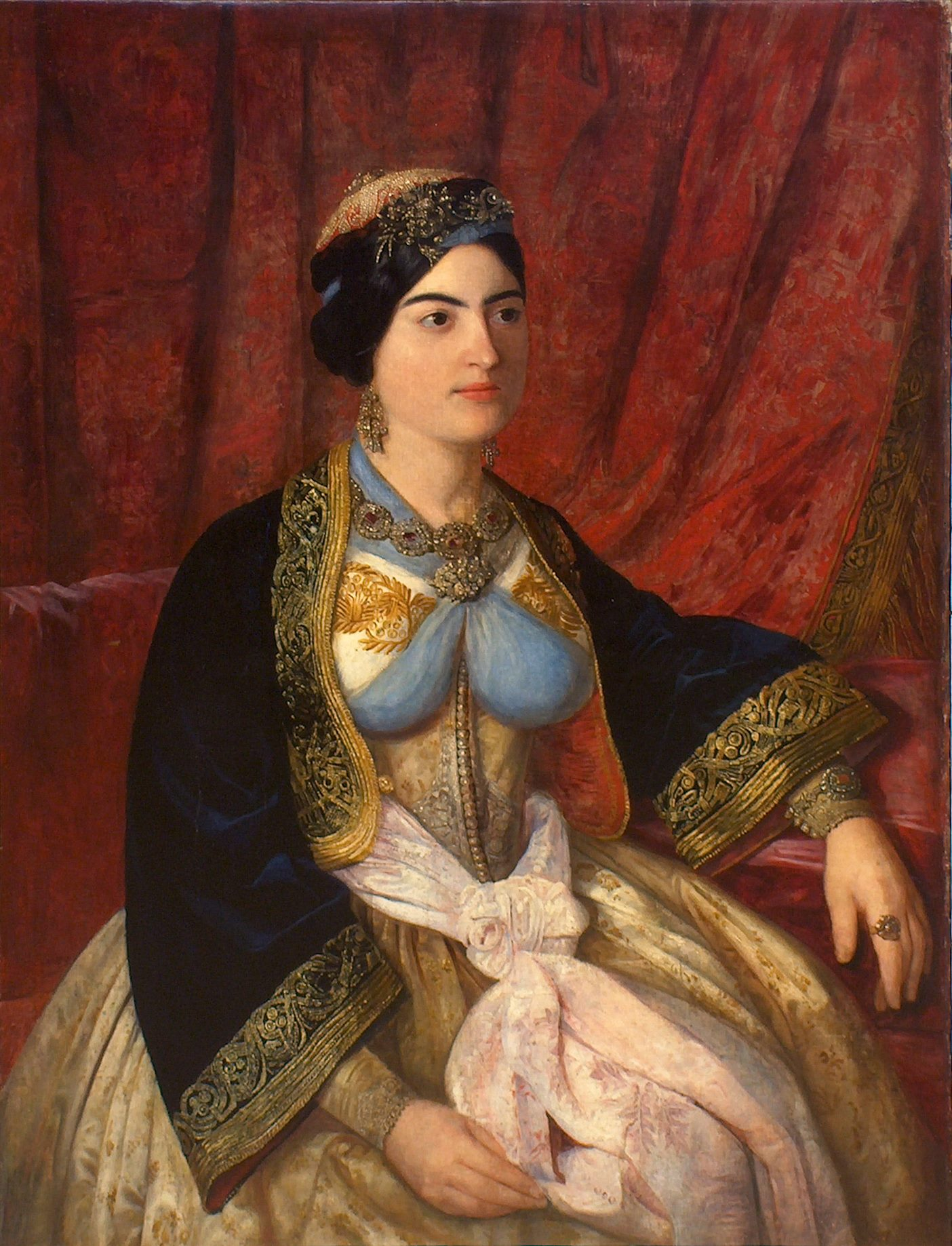
Alexander's wife, Princess Persida, painted by Katarina Ivanović.

On 1 June 1830 in Hotin, Bessarabia, he married Persida Nenadović, a member of the powerful Nenadović family and the daughter of Voivode Jevrem Nenadović and Jovanka Milovanović. They had ten children:

- Princess Poleksija (1 February 1833 – 5 December 1914), married firstly in 1849 Konstantin Nikolajević (1821 – suicide 13 October 1877), Minister of the Interior of Serbia, by whom she had issue; secondly Dr Alexander Preshern (1830 – 2 December 1914).
- Princess Kleopatra (26 November 1835 – 13 July 1855), married in 1855 Milan Avram Petronijević, Serbian Ambassador to Russia.
- Prince Aleksij (23 March 1836 – 21 April 1841)
- Prince Svetozar (1841 – 17 March 1847)
- Prince Peter (29 June 1844 – 16 August 1921), ruled Serbia from 1903 until 1918, and subsequently as King of the Kingdom of Serbs, Croats, and Slovenes until his death; married Princess Zorka of Montenegro, by whom he had issue, including Alexander I.
- Princess Jelena (18 October 1846 – 26 July 1867), married in 1867 Đorđe Simić (28 February 1843 – 11 October 1921), Prime Minister of Serbia.
- Prince Andrej (15 September 1848 – 12 July 1864)
- Princess Jelisaveta (born and died 1850)
- Prince Đorđe (11 October 1856 – 5 January 1889), based on Glas Crnogorca from 1884, he was reportedly engaged to Princess Olga of Montenegro.
- Prince Arsenije (16 April 1859 – 19 October 1938), married in 1892, Princess Aurora of San Donato. They were the parents of Prince Paul, Regent of Yugoslavia.

== Sources ==
Ward, A.W.; Prothero, G.W.; Leathes, Stanely, eds. (1921). The Cambridge Modern History. Vol. 10. Cambridge University Press.

Alexander Karađorđević, Prince of Serbia House of Karađorđević Born: 11 October 1806 Died: 3 May 1885
Regnal titles
Preceded by Mihailo Obrenović III	Prince of Serbia; 1842–1858	Succeeded by Miloš Obrenović I
