= Prince Arsen of Yugoslavia =

Serbian military officer (1859–1938)

Prince Arsenije
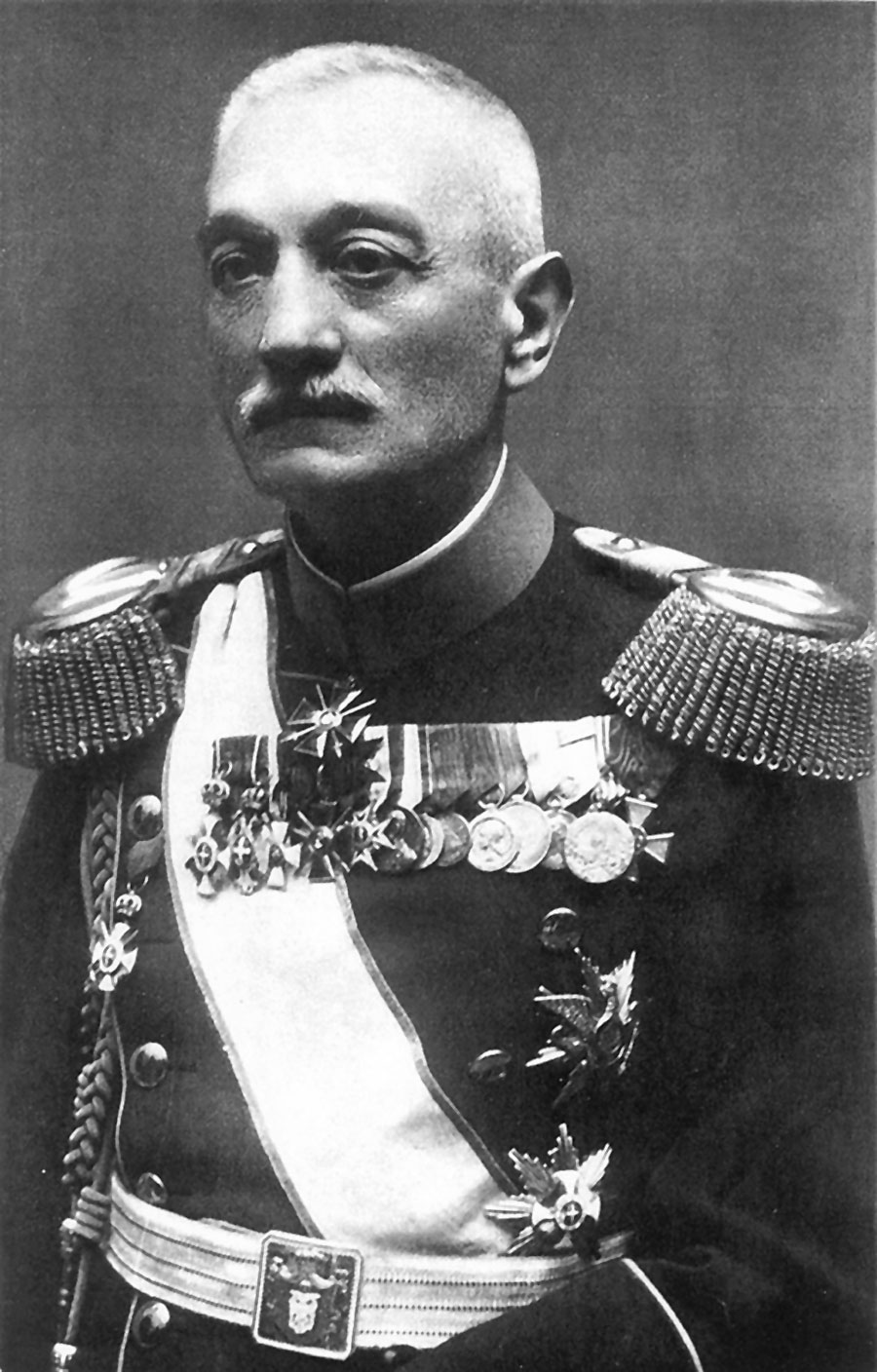
- Prince Arsen Karađorđević
- Born: 16 April 1859; Temesvár, Kingdom of Hungary, Austrian Empire
- Died: 19 October 1938 (aged 79); Paris, French Third Republic
- Burial: St. George's Church, Serbia
- Spouse: Aurora Pavlovna Demidova (m. 1892; div. 1896)
- Issue: Prince Paul of Yugoslavia
Names
- Arsenije Karađorđević
- House: Karađorđević
- Father: Alexander Karađorđević
- Mother: Persida Nenadović
- Military career
- Allegiance: Russian Empire; Kingdom of Serbia; Kingdom of Yugoslavia
- Rank: Major general (IRA); General (RSA); Army General (RYA)
- Unit: Cavalry

Prince Arsenije "Arsen" of Yugoslavia (Serbian: Арсеније Карађорђевић / Arsenije Karađorđević; 16/17 April 1859 – 19 October 1938) was a dynast of the House of Karađorđević and ancestor of the current cadet branch of the Royal Family which ruled Yugoslavia until 1945. He served as an officer in the Russian Army.

== Biography ==
He was born in Timișoara a year after his father Prince Alexander Karađorđević had been deposed from the Serbian throne (the predecessor regime to the Yugoslavian monarchy). His mother was Persida Nenadović. Prince Arsen's elder brother was Peter I, King of Serbia and, later, of the Serbs, Croats and Slovenes.

Prince Arsen was married in Saint Petersburg on 1 May 1892 to Princess Aurora Pavlovna Demidova of San Donato, daughter of Pavel Pavlovich Demidov, 2nd Prince of San Donato (whose uncle, Prince Anatoly Demidov, had been first married to Princess Mathilde Bonaparte) and of Prince Pavel's second wife Princess Elena Petrovna Trubetskaya.

Their only son was Prince Paul of Yugoslavia who was Regent of Yugoslavia from 9 October 1934 to 27 March 1941. The couple divorced on 26 December 1896 and Aurora Pavlovna was remarried to Count Nicola di Noghera in Genoa on 4 November 1897, with whom she had a daughter, Helena Aurora di Noghera (22 May 1898 – 12 October 1967). Aurora Pavlovna died in Turin on 28 June 1904.

Prince Arsen died in Paris on 19 October 1938.

Royal Monogram of Prince Arsen of Yugoslavia

== Honours and awards ==
=== Honours ===
Foreign Honours
Order of Saint Vladimir, Fourth class,1905
Order of Saint Stanislaus, Second Class,1905
Gold Sword for Bravery, 1906
Order of Carol I
Medal -"In memory of Russian -Japanese War "
Order of St. George, Fourth Class, 1915
National Honours
Order of Karađorđe's Star, First and Fourth Class
Order of the Yugoslav Crown, First Class, 1930

== See also ==
- Mikhail Miloradovich
- Semyon Zorich
- Anto Gvozdenović
- Marko Ivanovich Voinovich
- Matija Zmajević
