= Peter I of Serbia =

Last king of Serbia (r. 1903–18); first king of Yugoslavia (r. 1918–21)

Peter I Петар I Карађорђевић
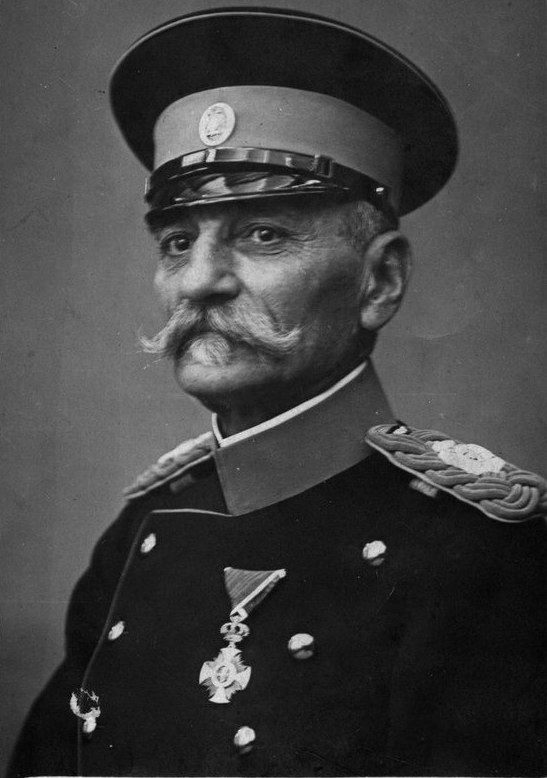
- King Peter in 1904

King of the Serbs, Croats and Slovenes
- Reign: 1 December 1918 – 16 August 1921
- Successor: Alexander I Karađorđević
- Regent: Alexander (1918–1921)

King of Serbia
- Reign: 15 June 1903 – 1 December 1918
- Coronation: 21 September 1904
- Predecessor: Alexander I Obrenović
- Regent: Alexander (1914–1918)
- Prime ministers: Full list
- Born: 11 July [O.S. 29 June] 1844; Belgrade, Serbia
- Died: 16 August 1921 (aged 77); Belgrade, Kingdom of Serbs, Croats and Slovenes
- Burial: Oplenac
- Spouse: Ljubica of Montenegro (m. 1883; died 1890)
- Issue: Helen, Princess of Russia; Princess Milena; George, Crown Prince of Serbia; Alexander I of Yugoslavia; Prince Andrew
- House: Karađorđević
- Father: Alexander Karađorđević, Prince of Serbia
- Mother: Persida Nenadović
- Military career
- Allegiance: Principality of Serbia; Kingdom of Serbia (Kingdom of Yugoslavia) Kingdom of Serbs, Croats and Slovenes
- Service years: 1855–58 (end of active service)
- Rank: Vojvoda (Field marshal)
- Conflicts: Franco-Prussian War (1870-1871); Herzegovina uprising (1875–1877); First Balkan War; Second Balkan War; World War I Koplik War

Styles of Peter I of Yugoslavia
- Reference style: His Majesty
- Spoken style: Your Majesty

Peter I (Serbo-Croatian: Петар I Карађорђевић, romanized: Petar I Karađorđević; 11 July [O.S. 29 June] 1844 – 16 August 1921) was King of Serbia from 15 June 1903 to 1 December 1918. On 1 December 1918, he became King of the Serbs, Croats and Slovenes, and he held that title until his death three years later. Since he was the king of Serbia during a period of great Serbian military success, he was remembered by Serbians as King Peter the Liberator and also as the Old King.

Peter was the fifth child and third son of Alexander Karađorđević, Prince of Serbia, and his wife, Persida Nenadović. Prince Alexander was forced to abdicate in 1858, and Peter lived with his family in exile. He fought with the French Foreign Legion in the Franco-Prussian War. He joined as a volunteer under the alias Peter Mrkonjić (Serbian Cyrillic: Петар Мркоњић, romanized: Petar Mrkonjić) in the Herzegovina uprising (1875–1877) against the Ottoman Empire. In 1883, Prince Peter married Princess Ljubica, daughter of King Nicholas I of Montenegro. Ljubica became known as Princess Zorka upon her marriage. Peter and Zorka had five children: Helen, Milena, George, Alexander, and Andrew. After his father died in 1885, Peter became head of the Karađorđević dynasty.

After King Alexander I from the rival House of Obrenović was murdered during the May Coup of 1903, Peter Karađorđević became the new King of Serbia. As king, he advocated a constitutional setup for the country and was famous for his liberal politics. Peter's rule was marked with the great exercise of political liberties, freedom of the press, national, economical and cultural rise, and it is sometimes dubbed a "golden" or "Periclean age". Peter was the supreme commander of the Royal Serbian Army in the Balkan Wars. On 24 June 1914, the aging king proclaimed his son and heir Alexander as regent. In World War I, the King and his army retreated across the Principality of Albania. Peter died in 1921 aged 77.

== Early life ==
Peter was born in Belgrade on 11 July [O.S. 29 June] 1844. He was the fifth of ten children born to Prince Alexander Karađorđević and his influential consort, Persida Nenadović. He was the grandson of Karađorđe, the leader of the First Serbian Uprising (1804–1813) and the founder of the Karađorđević dynasty. Peter was not born in the Royal Court, which was undergoing renovations at the time, but at the home of merchant Miša Anastasijević, whose daughter Sara (1836–1931) was later married to Peter's first cousin Prince George Karađorđević (1827–1884). His birth was not met with much celebration because he was his parents' third son and his older brother Svetozar was the heir to the throne.

His parents' oldest son, Aleksa, had died three years prior to Peter's birth, aged five, at which point Svetozar became heir. Peter did not become heir until Svetozar's death in 1847 at the age of six. Besides Belgrade, Peter spent much of his childhood in the town of Topola, from where the Karađorđević dynasty originated. He received his elementary education in Belgrade.

== Exile ==
=== Post-secondary education and Franco-Prussian War ===
In 1858, just as the fourteen-year-old Peter was preparing to depart for Geneva to attend high school, his father was forced to abdicate the throne. The Karađorđević dynasty's rivals, the Obrenović dynasty, were reinstated, and an Obrenović prince, Mihailo, claimed the throne. The two dynasties had been vying for power since 1817, when Karađorđe was assassinated on the orders of Miloš Obrenović, the founder of the Obrenović dynasty.

Peter left Geneva for Paris in 1861 and enrolled in the Collège Sainte-Barbe, located in the heart of the city's Latin Quarter. The following year, Peter enrolled in the Saint-Cyr, France's most prestigious military academy. He graduated from the academy in 1864, and continued living in Paris for some time thereafter. During this period, he pursued interests such as photography and painting, and read works of political philosophy, learning about liberalism, parliamentarism and democracy. In 1866, he entered the Higher Military School in Metz, which he attended until the following year. Two years later, his Serbian-language translation of John Stuart Mill's On Liberty was published.

At the outbreak of the 1870–71 Franco-Prussian War, Peter joined the French Foreign Legion under the pseudonym Petar Kara, together with relative Nikola Nikolajević. During his service, Peter held the rank of either lieutenant or second lieutenant, depending on the source, and fought with the 1st Foreign Regiment. He participated in the Second Battle of Orléans on 3–4 December 1870, as well as the Battle of Villersexel on 9 January 1871. He was awarded the Legion of Honour for his conduct during the two battles, but was captured by the Prussians shortly thereafter. He managed to escape captivity and returned to the front. Peter was involved in the Paris Commune in the spring of 1871, together with close friend and relative Vladimir Ljotić, though the exact nature of his involvement remains unknown.

=== Guerrilla activities ===
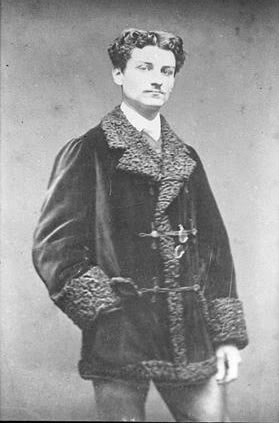
Prince Peter Karadjordjević, photographed by an unknown author during his exile years, (circa 1865)

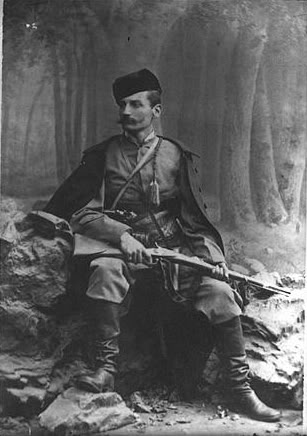
Peter in guerrilla uniform, c. 1875

With the outbreak of the Great Eastern Crisis of 1875–78, which erupted after Bosnian Serb rebels in Nevesinje staged a revolt against the Ottoman Empire, Peter returned to the Balkans and fought the Ottomans in northwestern Bosnia.

He adopted the nom de guerre of Petar Mrkonjić, and upon reaching the regions of Banija and Kordun in Austria-Hungary, took control of a guerrilla unit of about 200 men.

He arrived at Bosanska Dubica in August 1875, but received a cold welcome. He discovered that Prince Milan of Serbia (later King Milan I) was plotting to assassinate him fearing that Peter would attempt to wrest back the throne from the Obrenović dynasty. This revelation, combined with a string of battlefield defeats, compelled Peter and his followers to leave Bosnia and withdraw to Austria-Hungary.

They were subsequently detained by the Austro-Hungarian Army in the village of Bojna, near Glina. Peter escaped, returned to Bosnia and organized another band of rebels. Once again, his involvement in the fighting aroused suspicion in Belgrade, and by May 1876 his presence proved divisive.

The rebels split into three separate camps: one that supported Peter, another that supported Milan and a third that advocated Austro-Hungarian arbitration. Not wishing to cause further divisions among the rebels, Peter agreed to leave Bosnia. Prior to his departure, he wrote a letter to Milan explaining why he was leaving the battlefield and offering to make peace with the Obrenović dynasty.

Despite his attempts to make peace with Milan, accusations of treason continued to be levelled against Peter. He decided to travel to Kragujevac, the seat of the Royal Serbian Government, and address the National Assembly in an attempt to clear his name. In 1877, an anti-government uprising erupted in the Toplica region of southern Serbia, for which Milan blamed Peter and Karađorđević sympathizers. Peter was accused of treachery and collaboration with the Ottomans.

In the summer of 1878, he illegally crossed the border between Serbia and Austria-Hungary at Golubac via the Danube. Peter and his guide became lost in the Homolje mountains and were forced to hide from the authorities in the wilderness. Peter returned to Austria-Hungary shortly thereafter, but was arrested by the Austro-Hungarian police and interned at the Karađorđević family home in Bokszeg. In 1878, he was allowed to leave Bokszeg. He first went to Budapest and then to Paris. During this period, he was closely monitored by Austro-Hungarian spies, who took note of all his movements.

In January 1879, court proceedings were initiated against Peter and his closest companions in Smederevo. The plaintiff, Prince Milan, alleged that Peter and his followers had attempted to overthrow the Obrenović dynasty and place a Karađorđević on the throne. Peter and his companions were charged with high treason, for which the mandatory penalty was death. As he was living in Paris at the time of the proceedings, Peter was convicted in absentia and sentenced to death by hanging.

=== Move to Cetinje ===
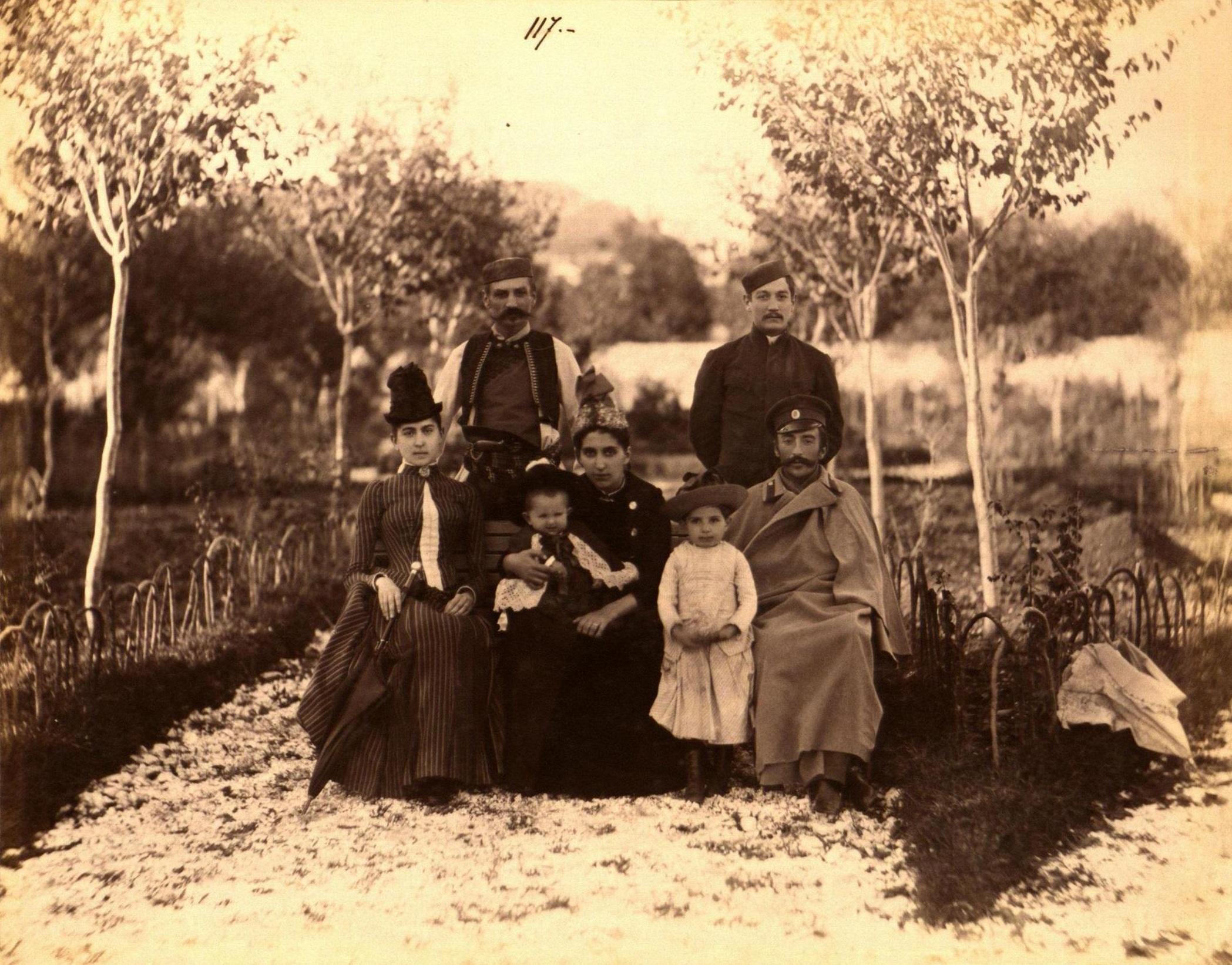
Peter (far left, standing) with his family in Cetinje, c. 1890; pictured with him are his wife Zorka (middle) and their children Helen and George (in front of their mother), his brothers Arsen (standing right) and George (sitting), and his paternal first cousin Persida Ida Nikolajević. (sitting far left).

Peter moved to Cetinje in 1883, the capital of the second independent Serb state, Montenegro, with the intention of marrying the eldest daughter of Montenegro's ruler, Prince Nicholas I (later King Nicholas I), whom he first met in Paris. Peter and Princess Ljubica of Montenegro were married in Cetinje in the summer of 1883. The marriage upset the region's volatile geopolitical balance, causing great unease in the Austro-Hungarian, Russian and Serbian capitals. Belgrade perceived it as a sign of increasing closeness between the Petrović-Njegoš and Karađorđević dynasties. Relations between the two Serb states worsened, as did relations between Austria-Hungary and Russia, which had been vying for power in the Balkans for decades.

When his father died in the spring of 1885, Peter became the head of the House of Karađorđević. Serbia, previously a principality, was declared a kingdom in 1882, and henceforth, the Serbian monarch used the title King of Serbia. Ljubica died during childbirth in March 1890. The couple had five children, three of whom reached adulthood: Helen (Jelena), Milena (1886-1887), George (Đorđe), Alexander (Aleksandar), and Andrew (Andrej) (1890-1890). Milena died in infancy and Andrew died along with his mother during childbirth in 1890.

Following his father's death, Peter's financial situation deteriorated and he became dependent on his father-in-law, as well as Russia and his brother George, for support. Following the Royal Serbian Army's rout in the Serbo-Bulgarian War of 1885, Peter and Nicholas devised a plan to invade Serbia and overthrow the Obrenović dynasty. At the last minute, Nicholas abandoned the idea. Peter felt betrayed by the Prince's decision to back out, leading to long lasting animosity. Nevertheless, he remained in Cetinje until 1894, devoting himself to his surviving children, who finished their primary education there.

In 1894, Peter moved to Geneva with his three children, where he was to remain until 1903. In 1899, Tsar Nicholas II of Russia invited Prince George and Prince Alexander, as well as Peter's nephew Paul, to attend the Corps des Pages military academy in Saint Petersburg free of charge. Due to his precarious financial situation, which prevented him from sending the boys to private schools in Switzerland, Peter accepted the Tsar's offer.

During his exile years, Peter, now a widower, proposed himself as a suitor to Princess Feodora of Saxe-Meiningen, niece of Wilhelm II, who was thirty-six years his junior, though this was likely a bid to gain support of the Kaiser for succeeding to the Serbian throne. Her mother, Princess Charlotte of Prussia declared that "for such a throne Feodora is far too good".

=== May Coup ===
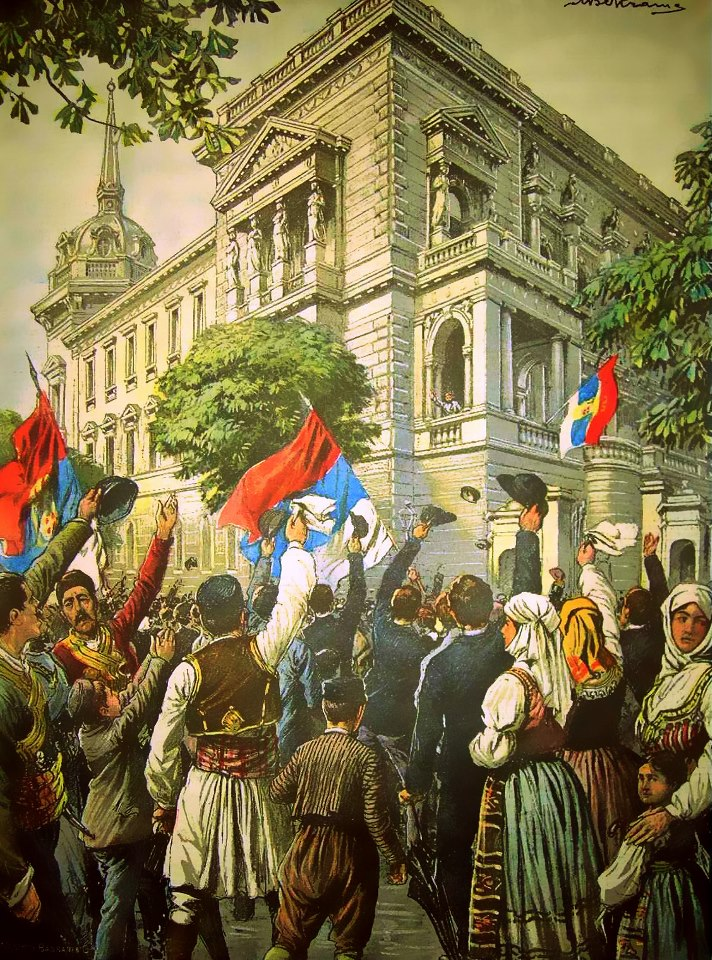
An illustration by Achille Beltrame on the occasion of the enthronement of Peter I

In July 1900, King Alexander I, Milan's 23-year-old son, married Draga Mašin, a widowed lady-in-waiting nine years his senior with a reputation for promiscuity. Mašin was also believed to be infertile, raising questions as to the viability of the Obrenović line. The marriage sparked outrage among the officer corps and led to a plot to remove Alexander from the throne. The officers, led by Dragutin Dimitrijević ("Apis"), initially sought to expel Alexander and Draga but realized that doing so would precipitate a conflict between the pro-Karađorđević and pro-Obrenović camps within the country.

By the autumn of 1901, the conspirators resolved to kill the King and Queen, thereby averting a possible civil war. Some officers proposed placing an English or German prince on the throne. Another suggested Prince Mirko, the second son of Nicholas of Montenegro, and others advocated forming a republic. Political conditions in Europe were such that the proclamation of a republic would only have increased the ire of the Great Powers towards Serbia in case Alexander was overthrown, giving Austria-Hungary a pretext to invade.

Preparations for the coup took place between 1901 and 1903. The conspirators decided to place Peter on the throne in November 1901, but Peter had little trust in them and their initial offers were rebuffed. He accepted their offers on the condition that officers he trusted would take part in the plot and insisted that he would not take any part himself. He also told the officers that he would agree to take the throne only if his ascent was approved by the National Assembly.

At the time of the coup, Peter was vacationing with his children and planning visits to Russia and Romania, suggesting that he was not aware of what was to occur. The officers raided the royal palace late in the evening of 10 June [O.S. 28 May] 1903 and shot the King and Queen, mutilating their corpses with sabres and tossing them from a third-floor balcony. The murders resulted in the extinction of the Obrenović line and resolved the century-long feud between the Karađorđević and Obrenović dynasties.

Peter expressed satisfaction with the outcome of the plot, as well as regret for the bloodshed that had occurred, describing it as "neither gentlemanly, nor worthy of the 20th century". On 15 June [O.S. 2 June] 1903, by decision of the National Assembly, Peter was summoned to assume the Serbian throne. He arrived in Belgrade on 26 June [O.S. 13 June] 1903.

Peter's ascent to the throne was met with great enthusiasm by South Slav nationalists, who believed he would succeed in uniting the South Slavs living in Serbia, Montenegro, Austria-Hungary and the Ottoman Empire. In Vienna, en route to Belgrade, he was welcomed by a crowd of euphoric Serb and Croat students, who hailed him as "the first Yugoslav king".

== Reign ==
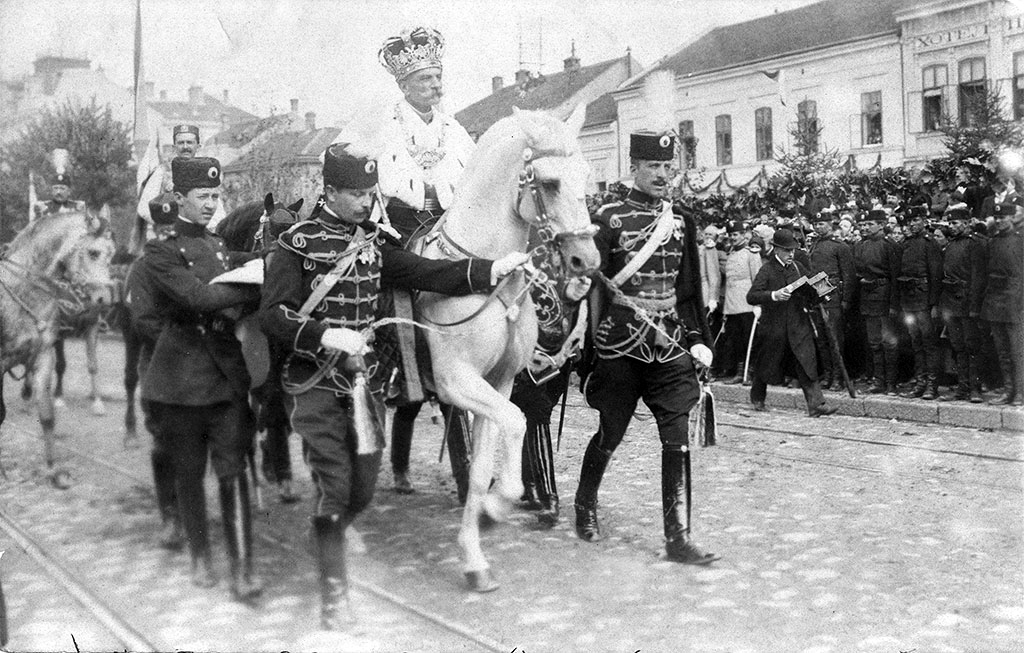
Peter emerging from St. Michael's Cathedral on horseback following his coronation

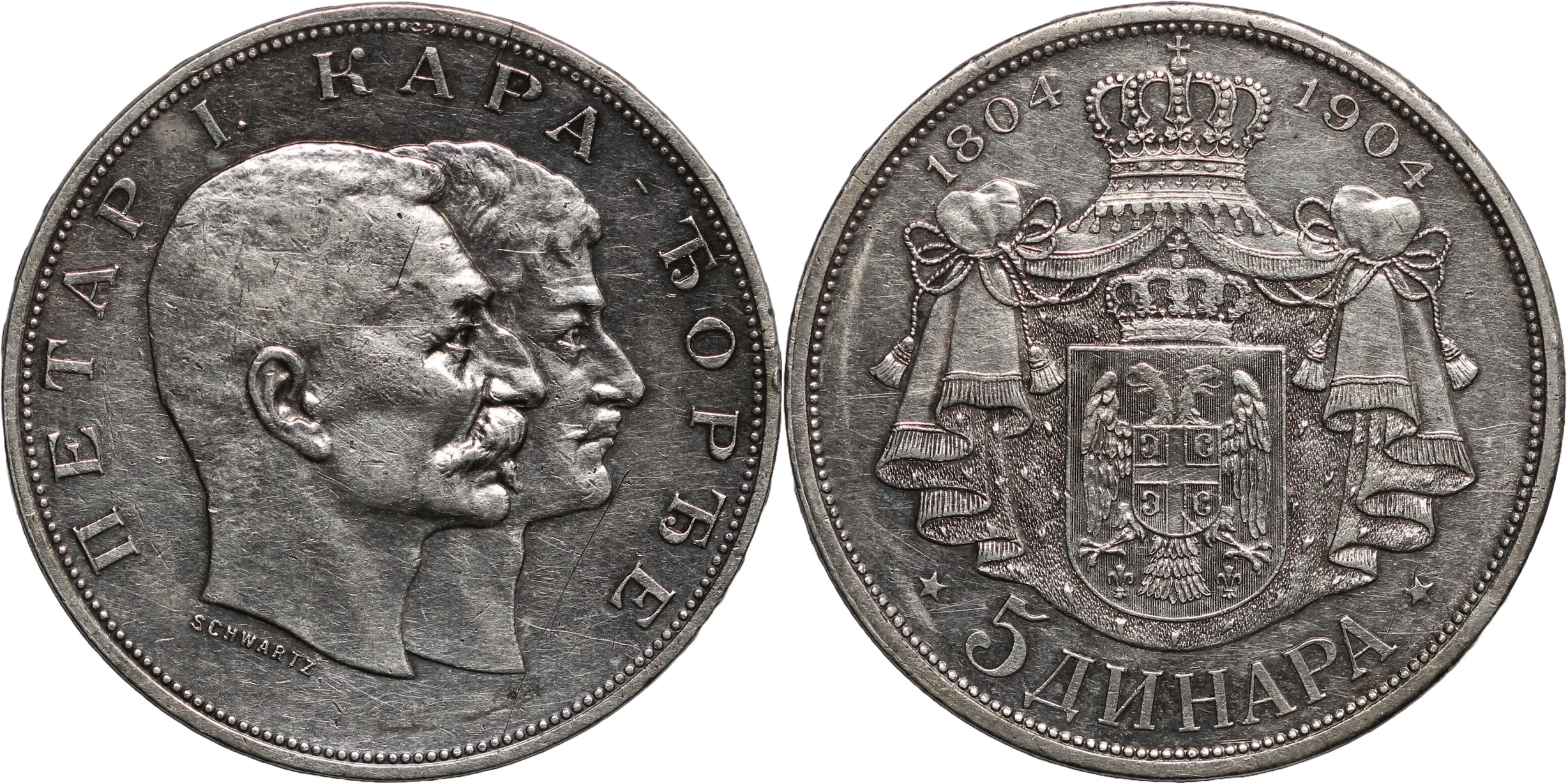
Silver coin: 5 Dinara - Peter I 100th Anniversary of the Karađorđević Dynasty, 1904

=== Accession ===
The royal couple's murder upset and shocked most of Europe, but many Serbs reacted enthusiastically. Russia immediately recognized the National Assembly's decision declaring Peter the next King of Serbia and expressed satisfaction that the inter-dynastic intrigues which had plagued the country since the early-19th century had been brought to an end. Austria-Hungary declared its neutrality on the matter, but privately, policymakers in Vienna expressed hope that Peter's accession would have a placating effect.

The United Kingdom demanded that the chief conspirators be severely punished, and when the Royal Serbian Government neglected to carry out this request, the British severed all diplomatic ties. Several other European nations followed in the United Kingdom's footsteps and severed ties as well. Peter lacked the power or authority to punish the conspirators. He also felt a deep sense of obligation towards them, acknowledging that he would not have been able to assume the throne were it not for their actions.

=== Coronation ===
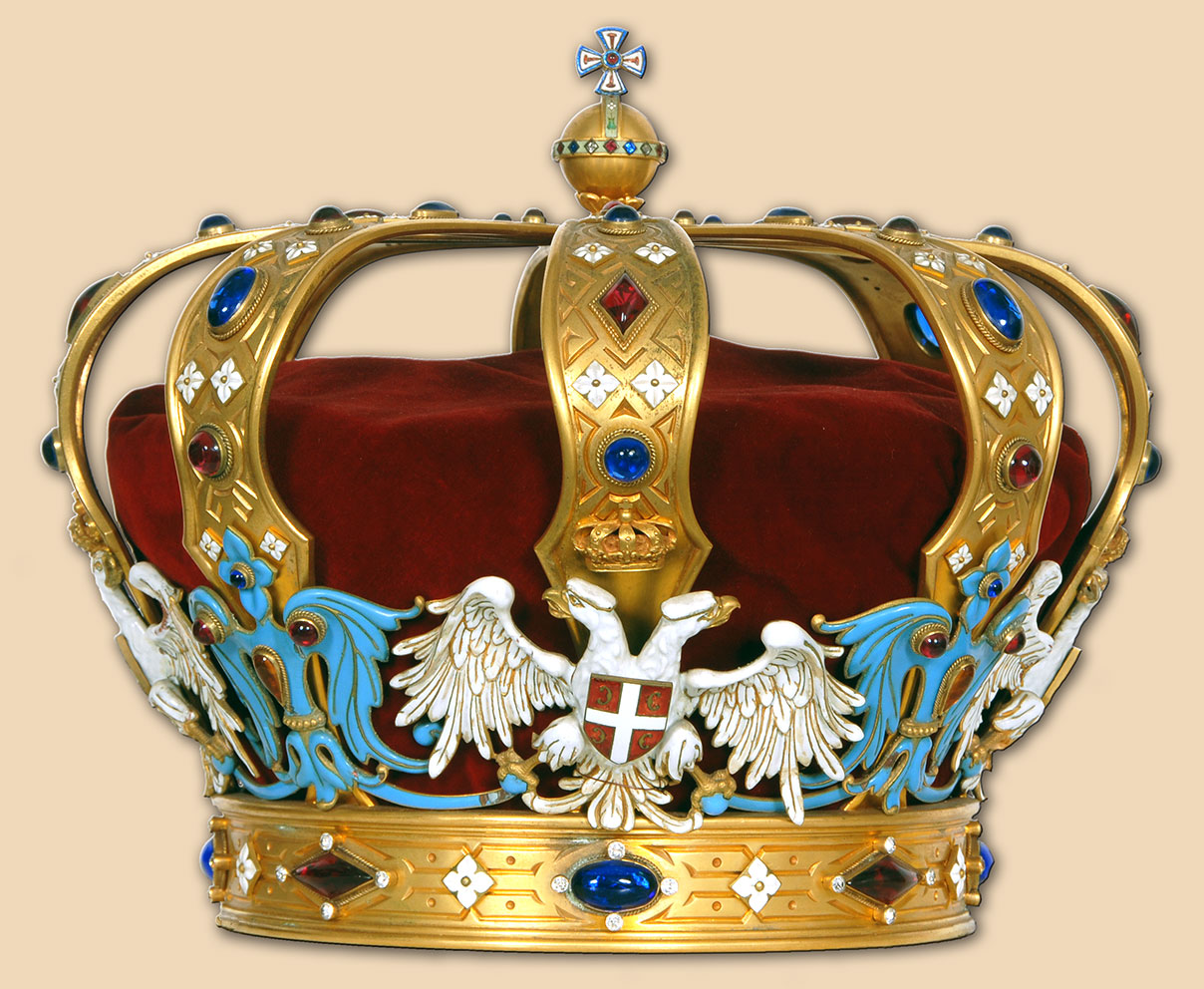
Karađorđević Crown

Peter was crowned in St. Michael's Cathedral in Belgrade, on 21 September [O.S. 8 September] 1904. The coronation ceremony, the first in Serbia's modern history, aimed to demonstrate that a new era had begun. The year-long interval between Peter's return to Serbia and his coronation deliberately made the ceremony coincide with the 100th anniversary of the First Serbian Uprising with the hope of giving European statesmen time to come to terms with the palace coup. Nevertheless, only representatives of Montenegro and Bulgaria attended.

New royal regalia, consisting of a crown, sceptre, orb and royal mantle, were commissioned specially for the occasion from the Parisian jewelers Falize Frères. Arnold Muir Wilson, the honorary Serbian consul in Sheffield, and his cameraman, Frank Mottershaw, filmed King Peter's procession and a parade following the coronation. This is the oldest surviving film recorded in Belgrade. According to film historian Paul Smith, it is also likely the first newsreel in history.

=== Foreign affairs ===
During the reign of Peter I the Kingdom of Serbia expanded to the south, incorporating much of Sandžak and Kosovo and Metohija in 1912 in the First Balkan War. Serbia temporarily controlled northern parts of Albania, but had to give away those parts to Albania in 1912-1913. In November 1918, shortly before the founding of the Kingdom of Serbs, Croats and Slovenes in December 1918, Serbia acquired some new territories like Srem, Banat, Bačka and Montenegro and which later became part of the new kingdom.

The most prominent prime minister during the reign of Peter I was Nikola Pašić. At the beginning of Peter's reign Pašić opposed the new king, calling his accession to the throne unlawful. However, he quickly changed his mind after seeing that the Serbian people accepted King Peter. As it turned out, the only conflict he had with Peter during the 18-year reign concerned the king's salary.

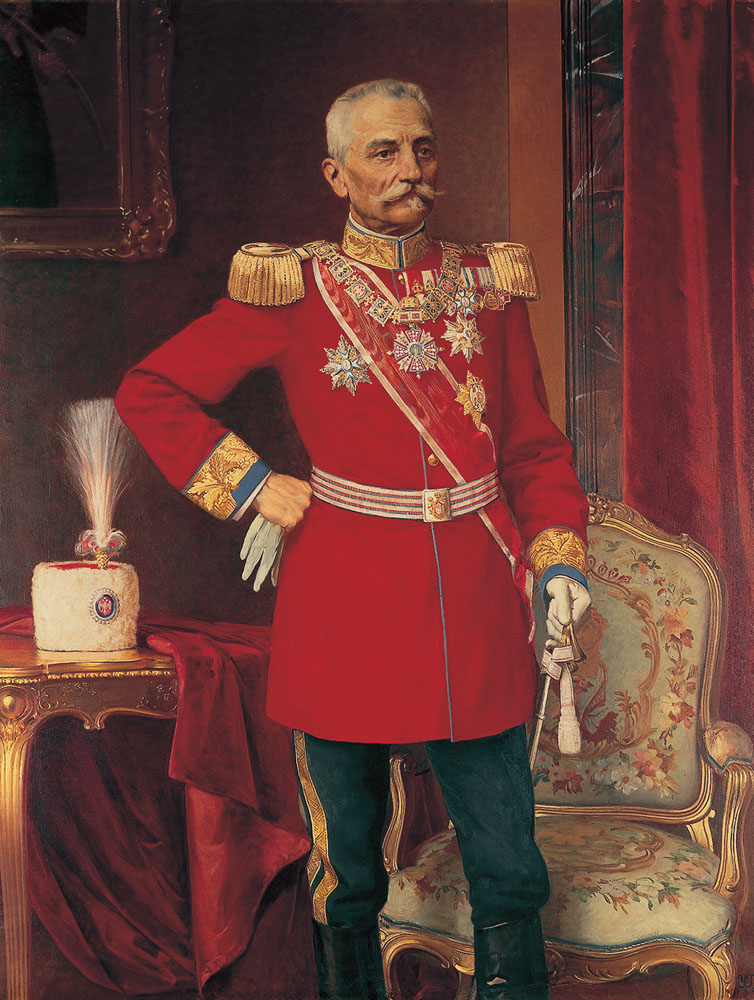
King Peter, by Uroš Predić

Peter I of Serbia saw Imperial Russia as Serbia's main ally. Russia opposed the previous politics of the Obrenović dynasty which heavily relied on Austria-Hungary, which the Serbian public detested.

==== First Balkan War ====
The First Balkan War began in October 1912 and ended in May 1913. It involved military actions of the Balkan League (Bulgaria, Serbia, Greece and Montenegro) against the Ottoman Empire. The combined armies of the Balkan states overcame the numerically inferior and strategically disadvantaged Ottoman armies and achieved rapid success. As a result of the war, the allies captured and partitioned almost all remaining European territories of the Ottoman Empire.

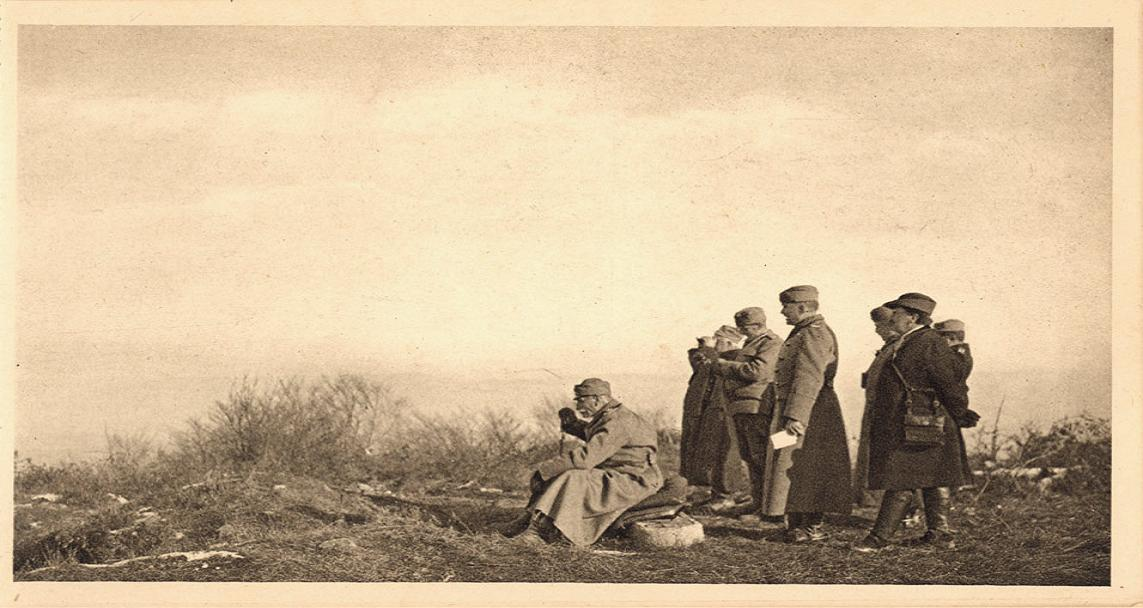
Peter I on the front

In May 1912 the Albanian Hamidian revolutionaries, who wanted to re-install Sultan Abdul Hamit II to power, drove the Young Turkish forces out of Skopje and pressed south towards Manastir (present day Bitola), forcing the Young Turks to grant effective autonomy over large regions in June 1912. Serbia, which had helped arm the Albanian Catholic and Hamidian rebels and had sent secret agents to some of the prominent leaders, took the revolt as a pretext for war. Serbia, Montenegro, Greece, and Bulgaria had all been in talks about possible offensives against the Ottoman Empire before the Albanian revolt of 1912 broke out; a formal agreement between Serbia and Montenegro had been signed on 7 March.

On 18 October 1912, Peter I of Serbia issued a declaration, "To the Serbian People", which appeared to support Albanians as well as Serbs:

"The Turkish governments showed no interest in their duties towards their citizens and turned a deaf ear to all complaints and suggestions. Things got so far out of hand that no one was satisfied with the situation in Turkey in Europe. It became unbearable for the Serbs, the Greeks and for the Albanians, too. By the grace of God, I have therefore ordered my brave army to join in the Holy War to free our brethren and to ensure a better future. In Old Serbia, my army will meet not only upon Christian Serbs, but also upon Muslim Serbs, who are equally dear to us, and in addition to them, upon Christian and Muslim Albanians with whom our people have shared joy and sorrow for thirteen centuries now. To all of them we bring freedom, brotherhood and equality."

In a search for allies, Serbia negotiated a contract with Bulgaria. The agreement provided that, in the event of victory against the Ottomans, Bulgaria would receive all of Macedonia south of the Kriva Palanka-Ohrid line. Bulgaria accepted Serbian expansion to the north of the Shar Mountains (i.e., Kosovo). The intervening area was agreed to be "disputed"; it would be arbitrated by the Emperor of Russia in the event of a successful war against the Ottoman Empire. During the course of the war, it became apparent that the Albanians did not consider Serbia as a liberator, as suggested by King Peter I, nor did the Serbian forces observe his declaration of amity toward Albanians.

Peter I led the Serbian army alongside marshals like Radomir Putnik, Stepa Stepanović, Božidar Janković and Petar Bojović. Serbia sent 230,000 soldiers (out of the population of just 2,912,000 people) with about 228 guns, grouped in 10 infantry divisions.

==== Second Balkan War and aftermath ====
Dissatisfied with its share of the spoils of the First Balkan War, Bulgaria attacked its former allies, Serbia and Greece, and started the Second Balkan War on 16 (O.S.)/29 June 1913. Serbian and Greek armies repulsed the Bulgarian offensive and counter-attacked, entering Bulgaria. With Bulgaria also having engaged in territorial disputes with Romania, this war provoked Romanian intervention against Bulgaria. The Ottoman Empire took advantage of the situation to regain some territories lost as a result of the previous war.

When Romanian troops approached the Bulgarian capital, Sofia, Bulgaria asked for an armistice, resulting in the 1913 Treaty of Bucharest, in which Bulgaria had to cede portions of its First Balkan War gains to Serbia, Greece and Romania. The Second Balkan War left Serbia as the most militarily powerful state south of the Danube. Years of military investment financed by French loans had borne fruit. Central Vardar and the eastern half of the Sanjak of Novi Pazar were acquired. Its territory grew in extent from 18,650 to 33,891 square miles and its population grew by more than one and a half million.

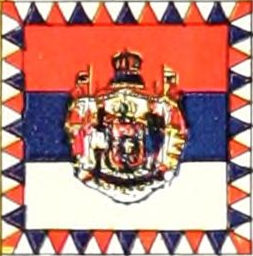
The Royal Standard of the King of Serbia

Because of his constant and intense efforts in the Balkan Wars, Peter's health worsened. At the same time, the Black Hand represented a core of military opposition to the National Assembly. Acting from within the government and the military, members of the Black Hand forced Peter to disband the government of Nikola Pašić, even though the Radical Party held most of the seats in the National Assembly. Only after Russian intervention and with the help of the French capital, was the crisis solved in Pašić's favor. King Peter had to withdraw, allegedly because of his failing health, and, on 24 June 1914, he passed his royal powers and duties to his heir-apparent, Alexander.

=== Politics ===
The Western-educated King Peter attempted to liberalize Serbia with the goal of creating a Western-style constitutional monarchy. Peter I became gradually very popular for his commitment to parliamentary democracy that, in spite of certain influence of military cliques in political life, functioned properly. The 1903 Constitution was a revised version of the 1888 Constitution, based on the Belgian Constitution of 1831, considered one of the most liberal in Europe. The governments were chosen from the parliamentary majority, mostly from the People's Radical Party led by Nikola Pašić and from the Independent Radical Party led by Ljubomir Stojanović.

King Peter himself favored the idea of a broader coalition government that would boost Serbian democracy and help pursue an independent course in foreign policy. In contrast to the Austrophile Obrenović dynasty, King Peter I relied on Russia and France, which provoked rising hostility from expansionist-minded Austria-Hungary. King Peter I paid two solemn visits to Saint Petersburg and Paris in 1910 and 1911 respectively, to be greeted as a hero both of democracy and of national independence in the troublesome Balkans.

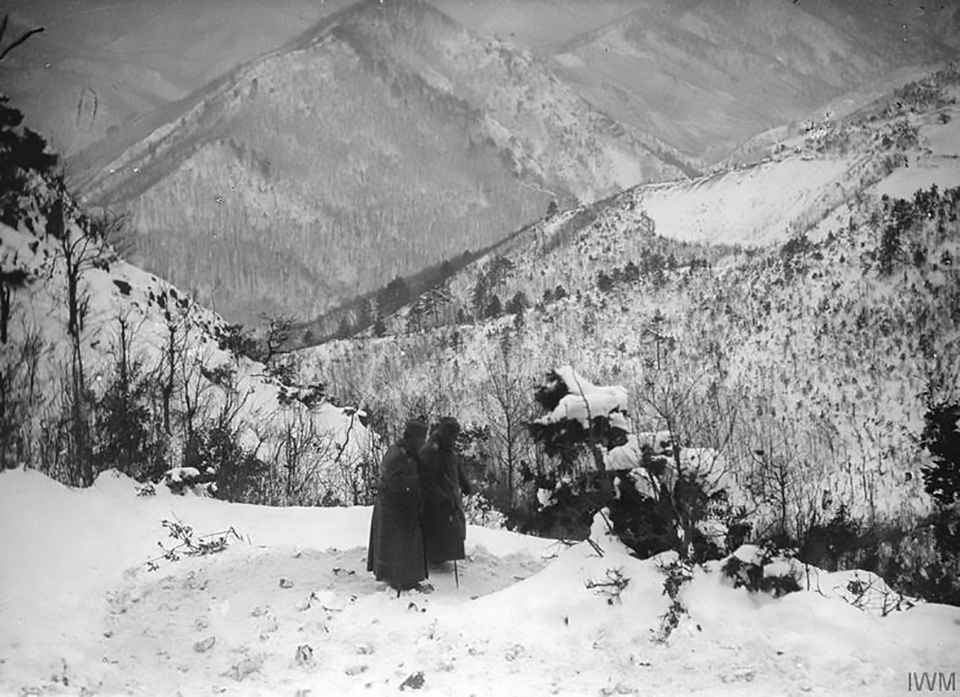
Peter I during the Great Retreat

The Royal Standard of the King. Peter the Liberator became the first King of Serbs, Croats and Slovenes

The reign of Peter I, from 1903 to 1914, is remembered as the "Golden Age of Serbia", due to the unrestricted political freedoms, free press, and cultural ascendancy among South Slavs who finally saw in democratic Serbia a Piedmont of South Slavs. King Peter I was supportive to the movement of Yugoslav unification, hosting in Belgrade various cultural gatherings. The Grand School of Belgrade was upgraded into Belgrade University in 1905, with scholars of international renown such as Jovan Cvijić, Milutin Milanković, Mihailo Petrović, Slobodan Jovanović, Jovan Žujović, Bogdan Popović, Jovan Skerlić, Sima Lozanić, Branislav Petronijević and several others.

King Peter I gained enormous popularity following the Balkan Wars in 1912 and 1913, which, from a Serb and South Slav perspective, proved greatly successful, heralded by the spectacular military victories over the Ottomans, followed by the liberation of "Old Serbia" (Kosovo Vilayet) and Macedonia (Manastir Vilayet).

The territory of Serbia doubled and her prestige among South Slavs (Croats and Slovenes in particular, and among the Serbs in Austria-Hungary, in Bosnia-Herzegovina, Vojvodina, the Military Frontier, Dalmatia, Slavonia, etc.) grew significantly, with Peter I as the main symbol of both political and cultural success. After the conflict between military and civilian representatives in the spring of 1914, King Peter chose to "retire" due to ill health, reassigning on 24 June 1914 his royal prerogatives to his second son heir apparent Crown Prince Alexander.

=== World War I and its aftermath ===
The retired King, spending most of his time in various Serbian spas, remained relatively inactive during the First World War, although occasionally, when the military situation became critical, he visited trenches on the front-line to check up on morale of his troops. His visit to the firing line prior to the Battle of Kolubara in late 1914 boosted the morale of the retreating Serbian forces and announced a counter-offensive, sparking victory against numerically superior Austro-Hungarian forces (December 1914). Another memorable visit in 1915 involved King Peter, by then 71, picking up a rifle and shooting at enemy soldiers. Following the invasion of Serbia by the joint forces of Germany, Austria-Hungary and Bulgaria in October 1915, King Peter I led the army and tens of thousands of civilian refugees through the high mountains of Albania to the Adriatic sea on a "Calvary known to few peoples".

After the dramatic retreat in a harsh winter through the hostile environment of the Albanian highlands from Prizren to the Albanian littoral, a march that took more than 100,000 lives, the King and his army, exhausted by cold and famine, were eventually transported by the Allies to the Greek isle of Corfu in early 1916. For the rest of World War I King Peter I, already in very poor health, remained on Corfu, which became the seat of the Serbian government-in-exile until December 1918.

On 1 December 1918 King Peter I was proclaimed King of the Serbs, Croats and Slovenes. King Peter stayed abroad until July 1919, then returned to Belgrade, where he died in 1921 at the age of 77. He was solemnly buried in his endowment in Oplenac, the Church of Saint George in the vicinity of Topola in Central Serbia, where his grandfather Karađorđe, the founder of the dynasty, had launched a large-scale insurrection against the Ottomans in 1804.

== Legacy ==
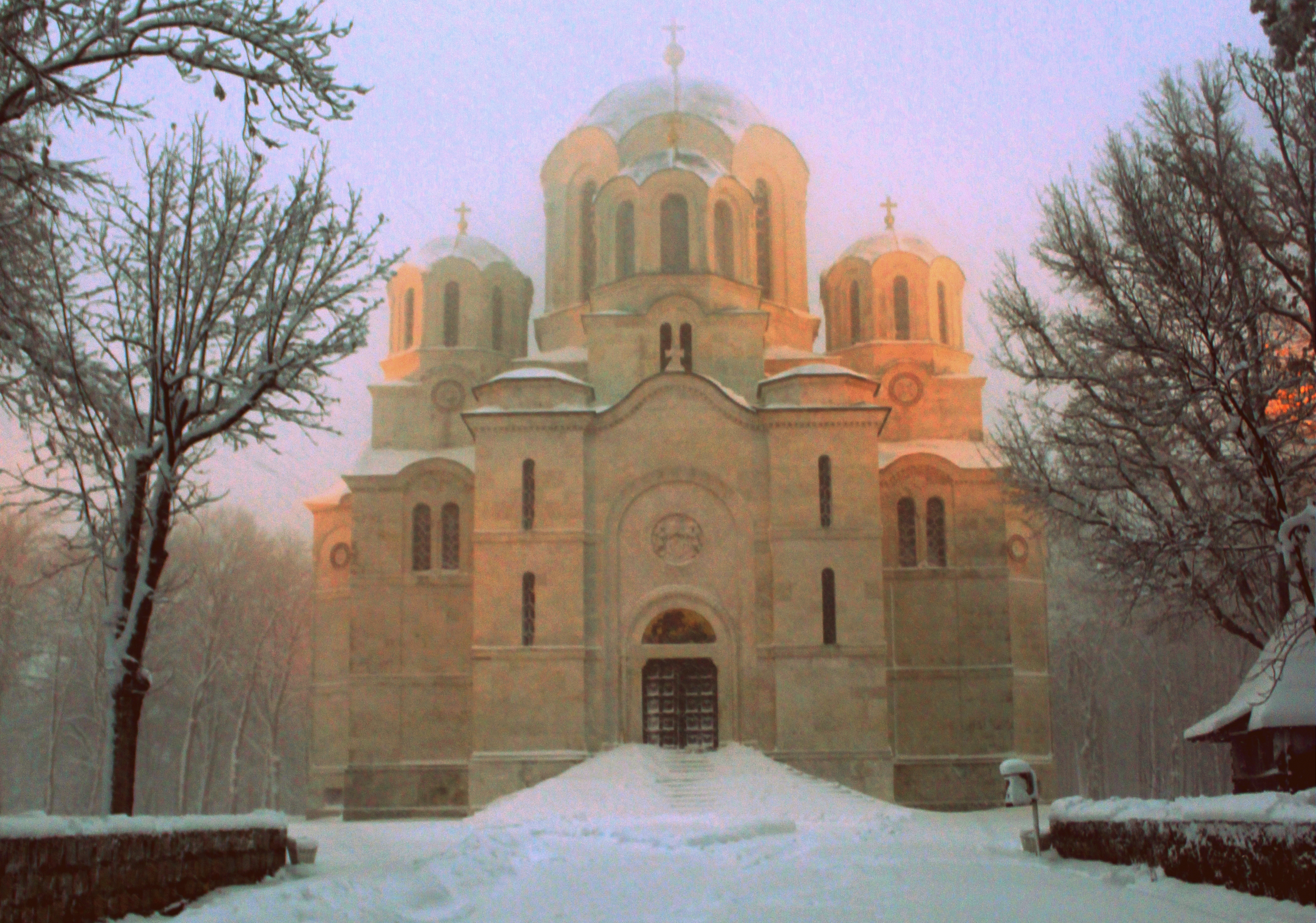
Peter I founded Oplenac, which is also a mausoleum of Karađorđević dynasty

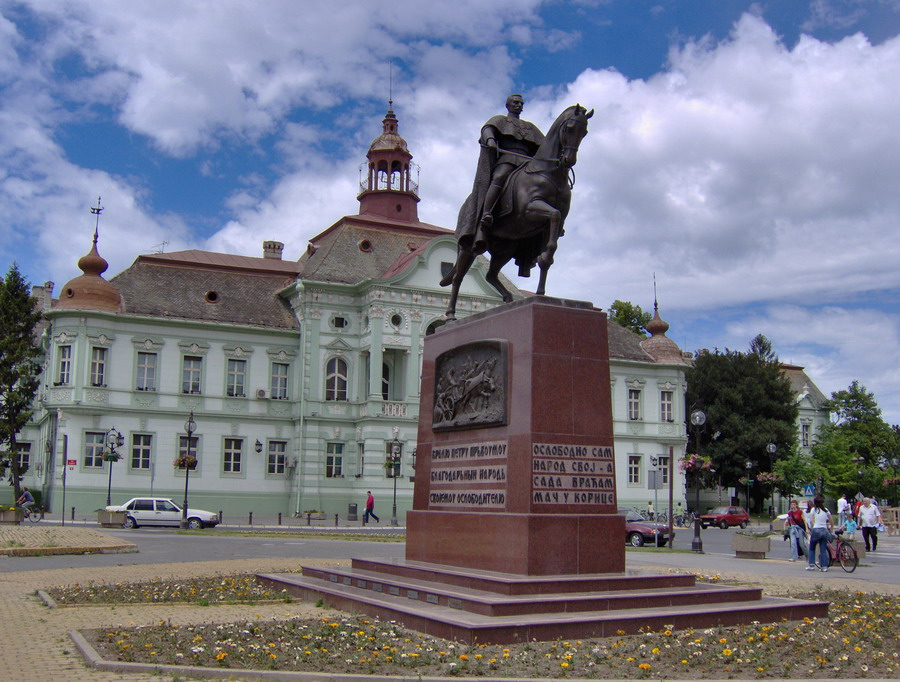
A monument to Peter I in Zrenjanin

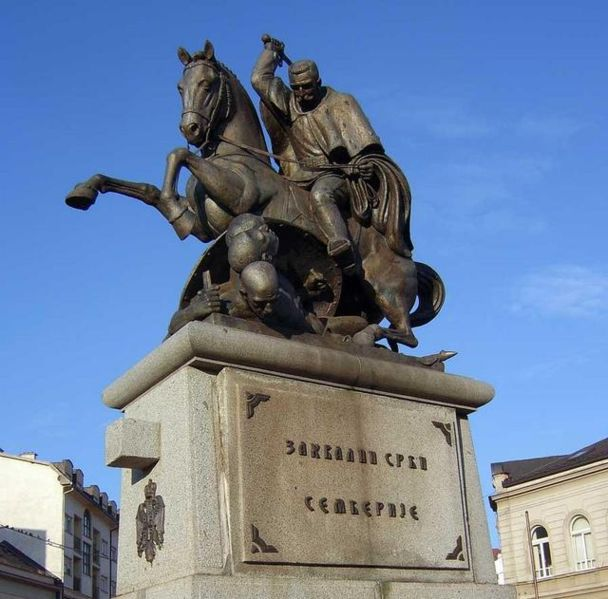
Monument to Peter I in Bijeljina

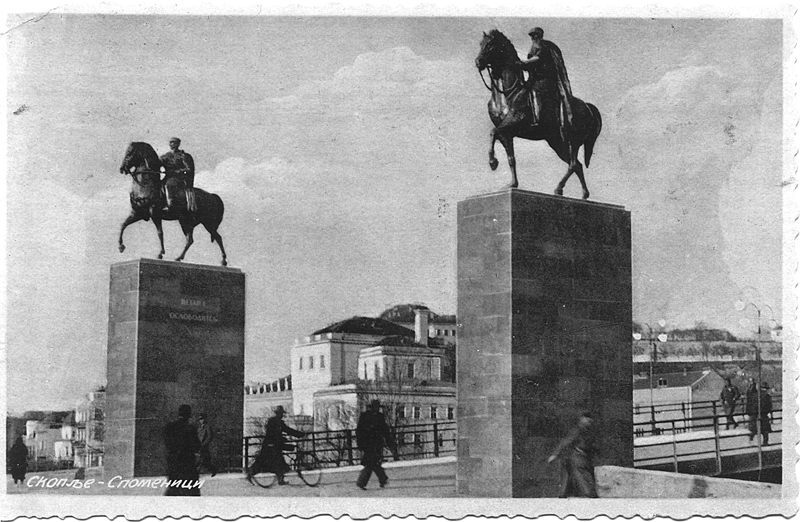
Former monument to Peter I at the Macedonia Square in Skopje

Three cities in interwar Yugoslavia were named after King Peter I: Mrkonjić Grad in Bosnia-Herzegovina (former Varcar Vakuf), Petrovgrad in Vojvodina (Veliki Bečkerek, now Zrenjanin) and Petrovac na Moru (former Kaštel Lastva) in Montenegro. Dozens of monuments erected in his honor throughout Yugoslavia were destroyed after the communist takeover in 1945. Only one monument, in Zrenjanin (former Petrovgrad) was recently restored, as well as several smaller monuments in Belgrade and the rest of Serbia. The other monuments in honor to King Peter I were restored or erected in Republika Srpska, in Bosnia and Herzegovina where his cult status as a national hero is as strong as it is in Serbia.

In Paris, an avenue off the Champs-Élysées is named after him, Avenue Pierre 1er de Serbie. There is a modest monument dedicated to King Peter I of Serbia in Orléans, France, when he fought as a volunteer in the French army. A large monument to King Peter and his son Alexander I of Yugoslavia was also unveiled in 1936, at the Porte de la Muette in Paris. The film King Petar of Serbia was released in early December 2018 starring Lazar Ristovski as King Peter.

== Honours ==
Serbian decorations and medals
Order of Saint Prince Lazarus, Collar (Royal Order only)
Order of Karađorđe's Star, Grand Master
Order of the White Eagle, Grand Master
Order of Karađorđe's Star with Swords, Grand Master
Order of the White Eagle with swords, Grand Master
Order of Saint Sava, Grand Master
Serbian Service Medals
Medal of the Serbian Red Cross
Medal for Military Merit
Commemorative Medal of the Election of Peter I as King of Serbia
Commemorative Medal of the first Balkan War, 1912
Commemorative Medal of the second Balkan War, 1913
Commemorative Medal of the Albanian Campaign
International and Foreign Awards
Order of Saint Peter of Cetinje, Knight (Montenegro)
Order of Prince Danilo I, Knight Grand Cross (Montenegro)
Order of the Tower and Sword, Grand Cross (Portugal)
Order of Saint Andrew, Collar (Russia)
Order of the White Eagle, Knight Grand Cross (Russia)
Order of Saint Alexander Nevsky, Knight Grand Cross (Russia)
Order of Saint Anna, 1st class (Russia)
Order of Saint Stanislaus, Knight Grand Cross (Russia)
Order of the Most Holy Annunciation, Collar (Italy)
Order of Saints Maurice and Lazarus, Knight Grand Cross (Italy)
Order of the Crown of Italy, Knight Grand Cross (Italy)
Order of Osmaniye, 1st class (Ottoman Empire)
Order of the Medjidie, 3rd class (Ottoman Empire)
Legion of Honour, Grand Cross (France)

== See also ==
- House of Karađorđević
- List of Serbian monarchs

== Notes ==
Peter I of Serbia House of Karađorđević Born: 29 June 1844 Died: 16 August 1921
Regnal titles
Preceded by Alexander I of Serbia	King of Serbia; 15 June 1903 – 1 December 1918	Expansion of state proclaimed King of the Serbs, Croats and Slovenes
New title	King of the Serbs, Croats and Slovenes; 1 December 1918 – 16 August 1921	Succeeded by Alexander I of Yugoslavia
