= Carole Presern =

- Presern at the 2014 Partners' Forum, Johannesburg
- Citizenship: United Kingdom
- Occupations: Midwife, Development worker, Diplomat

Carole Presern has been executive director of The Partnership for Maternal, Newborn & Child Health (PMNCH) since January 2011.

== Career ==
She trained as a nurse and as a midwife before gaining a degree in anthropology from University College London. She also holds a doctorate in public health policy and an advanced degree in health systems management.

She came to The Partnership from the GAVI Alliance, where she worked variously as Director of Change Management, interim managing director (External Relations) and managing director (Special Projects). While in Geneva, Presern also worked as Counsellor at the Permanent Mission of the United Kingdom to the United Nations in Geneva, covering specialized agencies, health and humanitarian affairs. She worked for DFID/UK in Pakistan, Nepal and Zimbabwe. Her last DFID post covered Africa (on HIV/AIDS), and as Senior Health Adviser, focused on Malawi, Mozambique, Zambia and Zimbabwe. Her previous posts include Director of VSO Nepal, consultancies for multilateral organisations and work as a midwife at Nong Samet on the Thai/Cambodian border.

She has been a member of various boards, including the Global Fund to Fight AIDS, TB and Malaria, UNITAID and most recently on the board of the International HIV Alliance.
