= Presern =

Presern or Prešern is a surname. Notable people with the surname include:

- Bojan Prešern (born 1962), Slovenian rower
- Carole Presern, British medical administrator

== See also ==
- France Prešeren, Slovenian national poet
- Karl or Carl Preser (1828-1910), German writer from Hesse
