= Petronijević =

Petronijević is a Croatian and Serbian surname. It can refer to:

- Avram Petronijević (1791–1852), Serbian politician
- Branislav Petronijević (1875–1954), Serbian philosopher and paleontologist
- Dušan Petronijević (born 1983), Serbian footballer
- Mateja Petronijević (born 1986), Croatian sailor
- Daniel (Dan) Petronijevic (born 1981), Serbian-Canadian actor
