= Brankovina =

Coordinates: 44°21′N 19°53′E

Brankovina Бранковина
- Village (Selo)
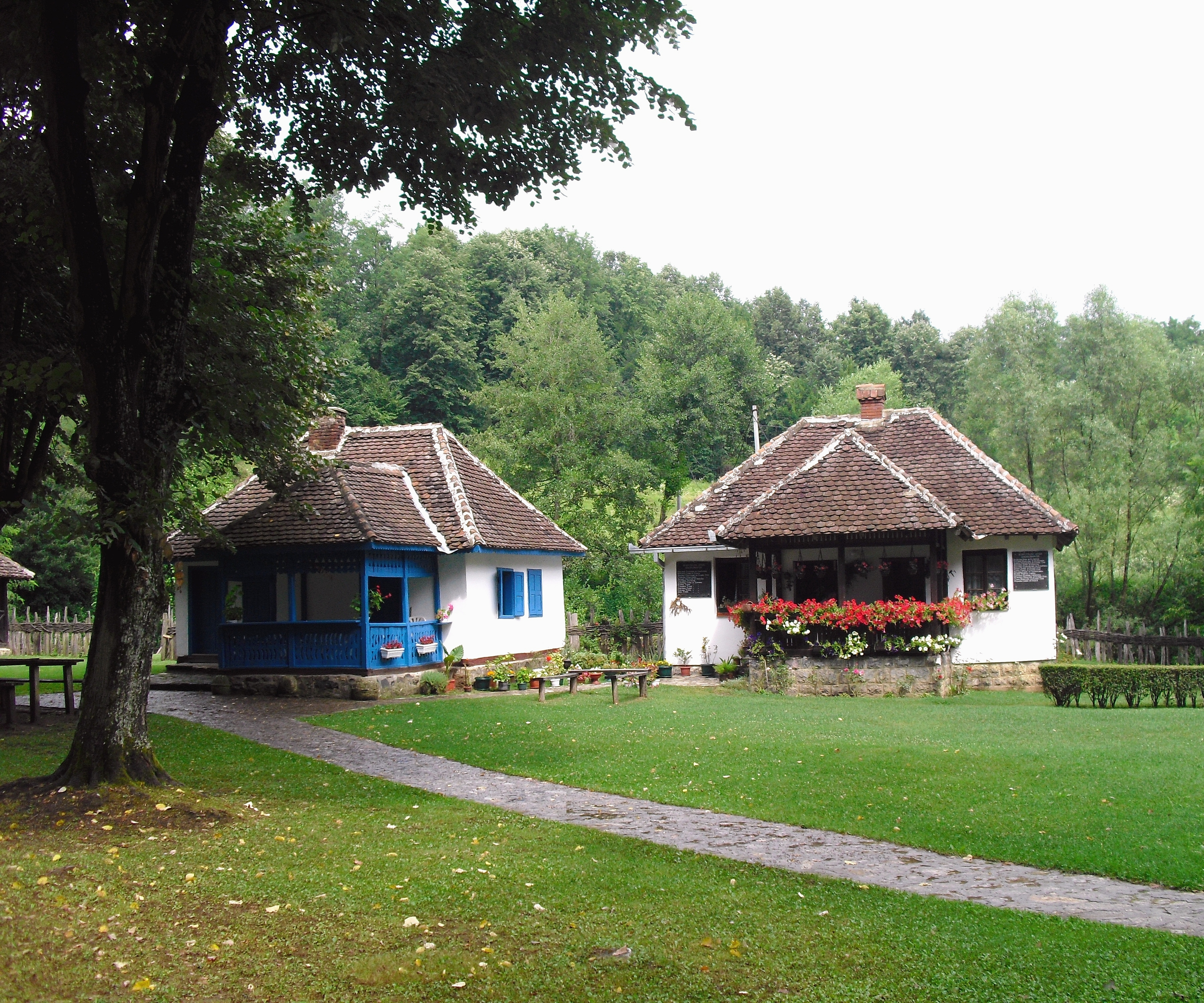
- Brankovina village
- Interactive map of Brankovina
- Country: Serbia
- District: Kolubara District
- Municipality: Valjevo municipality
- Elevation: 267 m (876 ft)

Population (2002)
  - Total: 573
- Postal code: 14201
- Area code: 014

Brankovina (Serbian: Бранковина) is a village in the municipality of Valjevo, Kolubara District, Serbia. It is located about 12 kilometers north of Valjevo. According to the census of 2002, the village had a population of 573.

Brankovina was declared a Historic Landmark of Great Importance in 1979, and is a protected space.

There are several cultural monuments located in Brankovina:

- Church of the Holy Archangels, which was completed in 1830, site of the endowment of Archpriest Mateja Nenadović.
- Ljuba Nenadović Vajat, built in 1826, birthplace of Ljuba Nenadović.
- Old School, built in 1833.

Brankovina is also notable for being a primary residence of the Serbian poet Desanka Maksimović, who spent her childhood (she was born in the nearby village of Rabrovica, now present day Valjevo) and completed primary school there. Throughout her life, Desanka remained emotionally attached to Brankovina, and she frequently revisited the town and spent her last years there In 1993, Maksimović died and was buried in Brankovina, according to her wishes. The Desanka Maksimović Prize is traditionally presented at a ceremony held in Brankovina on Maksimović's birthday, May 16, during the literary event Desankini majski razgovori (Desanka’s May Conversations).

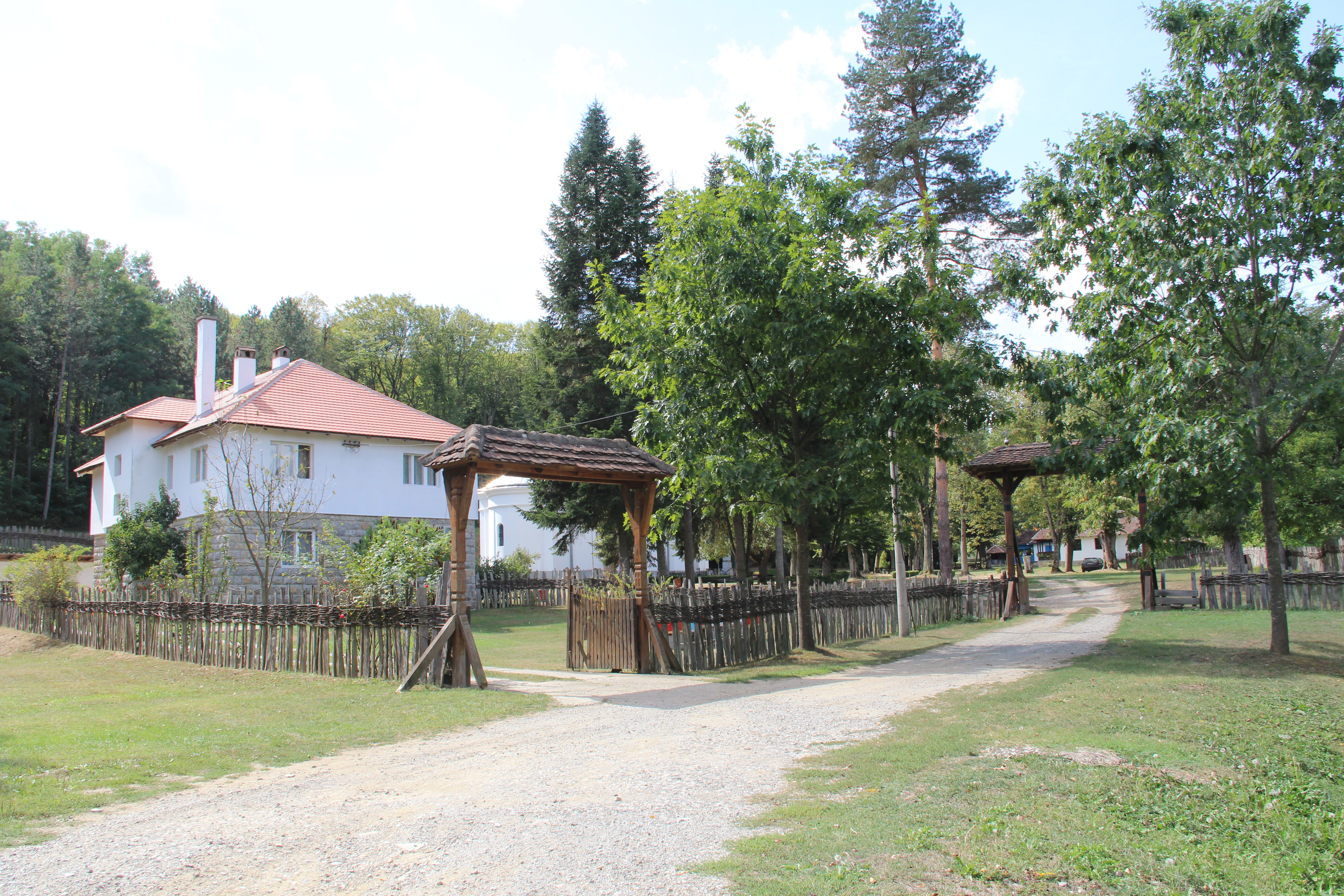
Brankovina - Cultural-historical complex

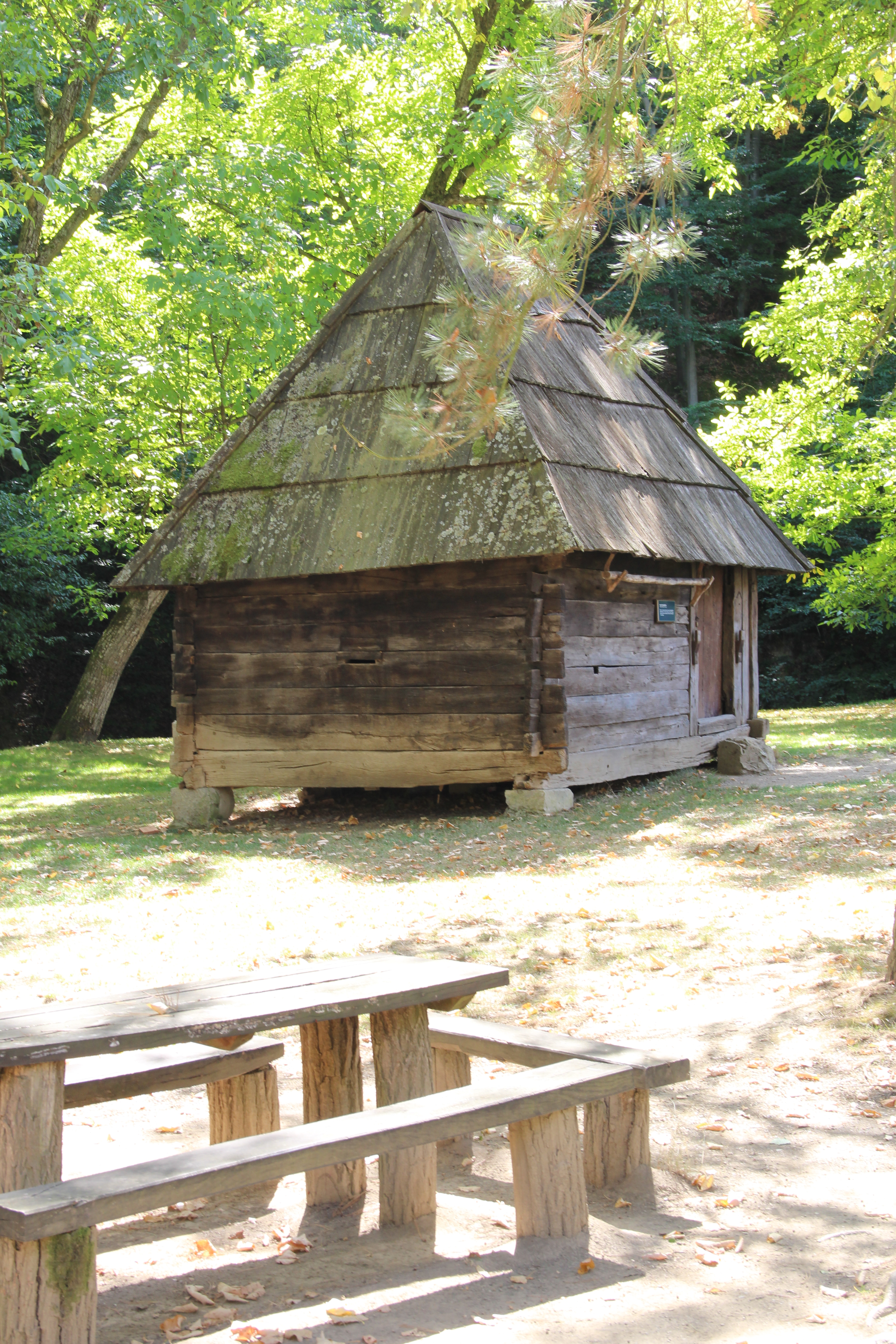
Brankovina - Cultural-historical complex

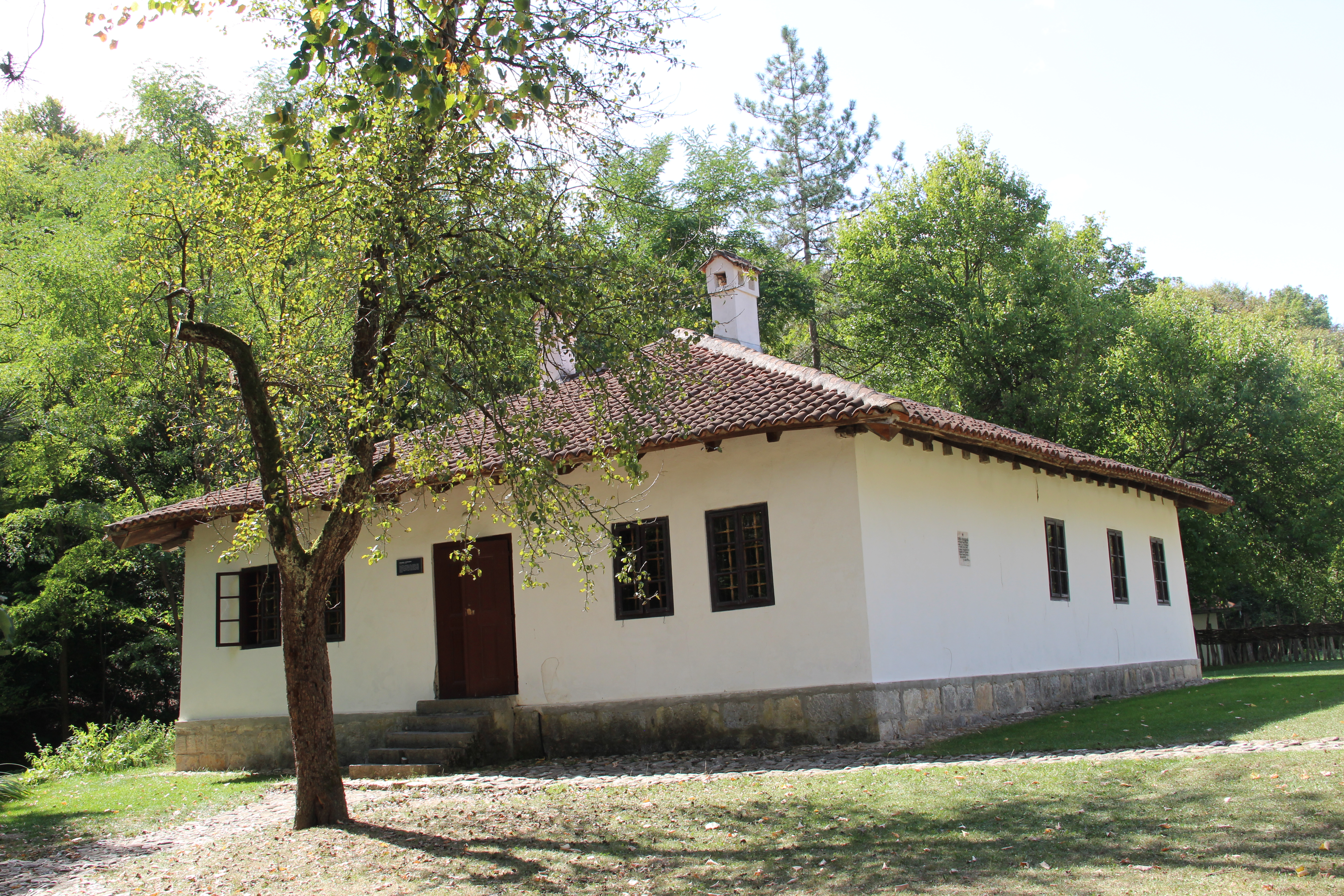
Brankovina - Cultural-historical complex

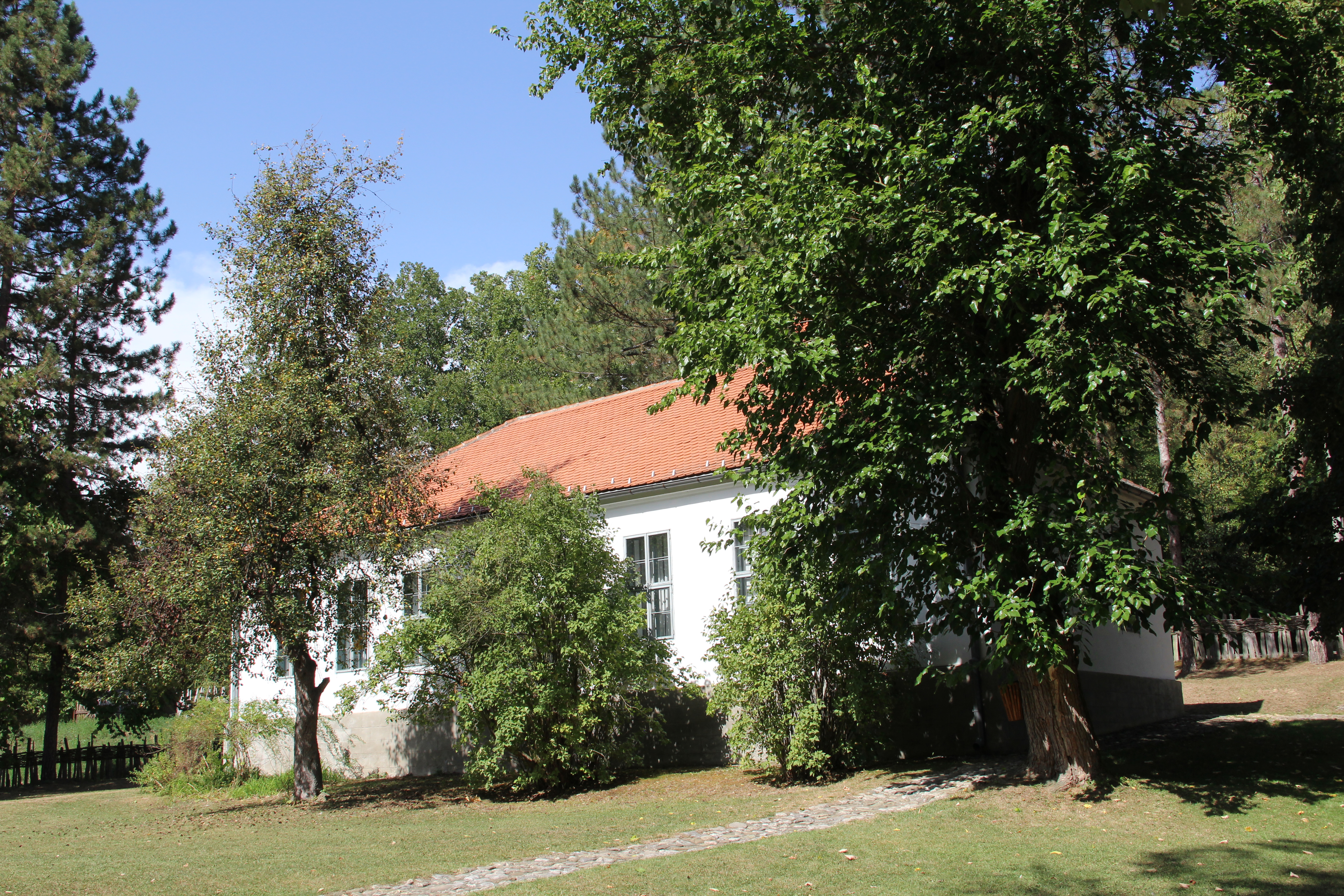
Brankovina - Cultural-historical complex

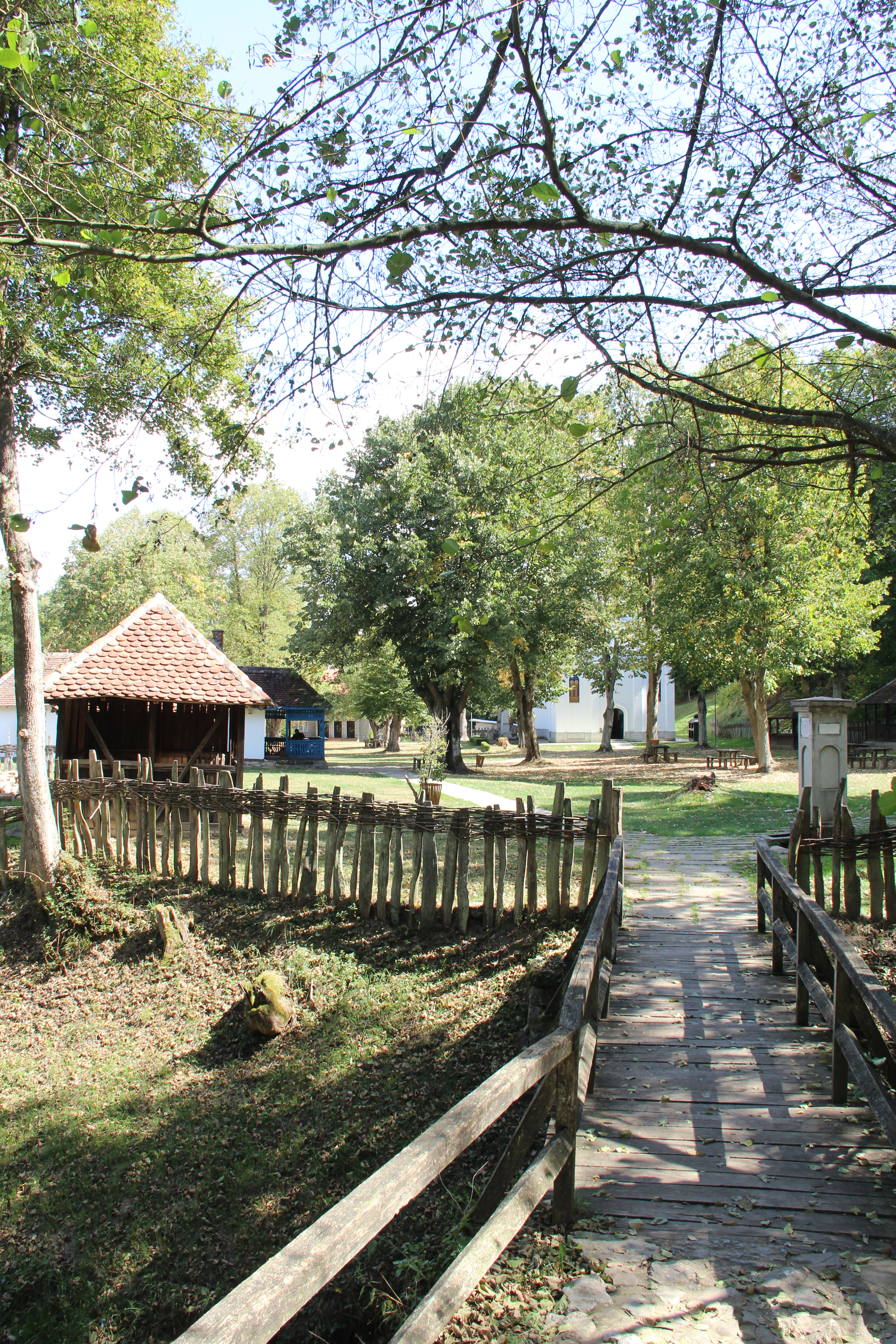
Brankovina - Cultural-historical complex

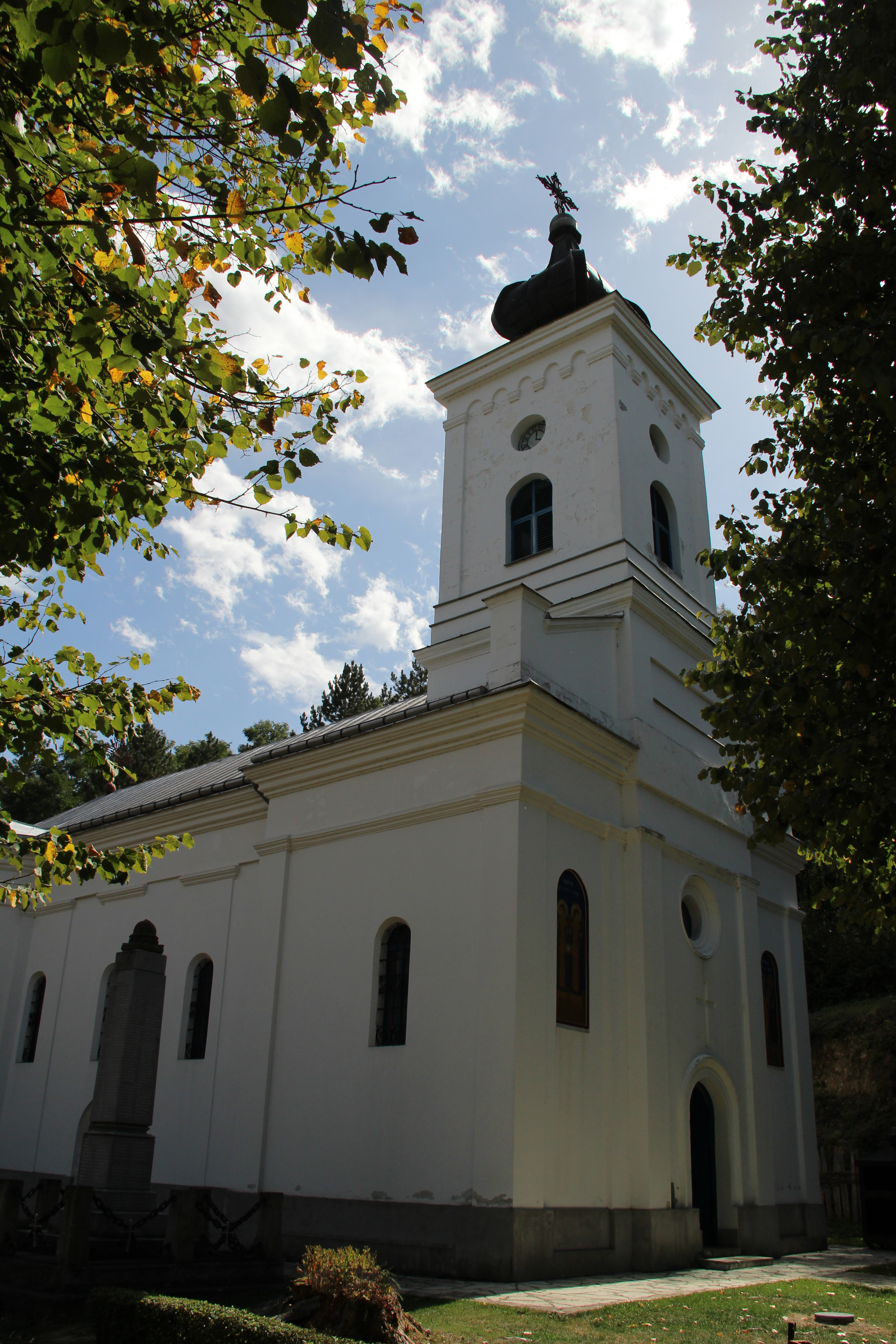
Brankovina - Cultural-historical complex

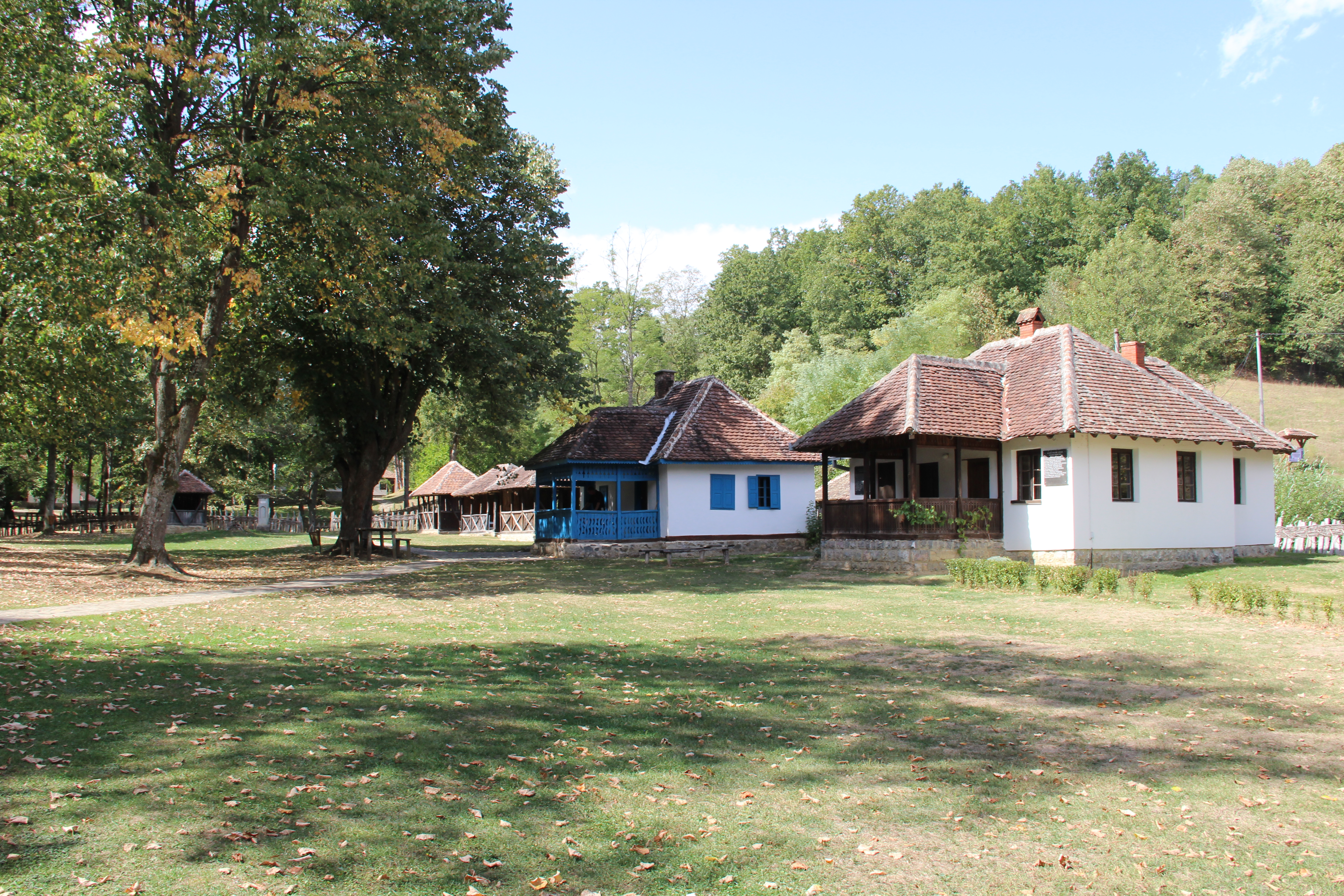
Brankovina - Cultural-historical complex

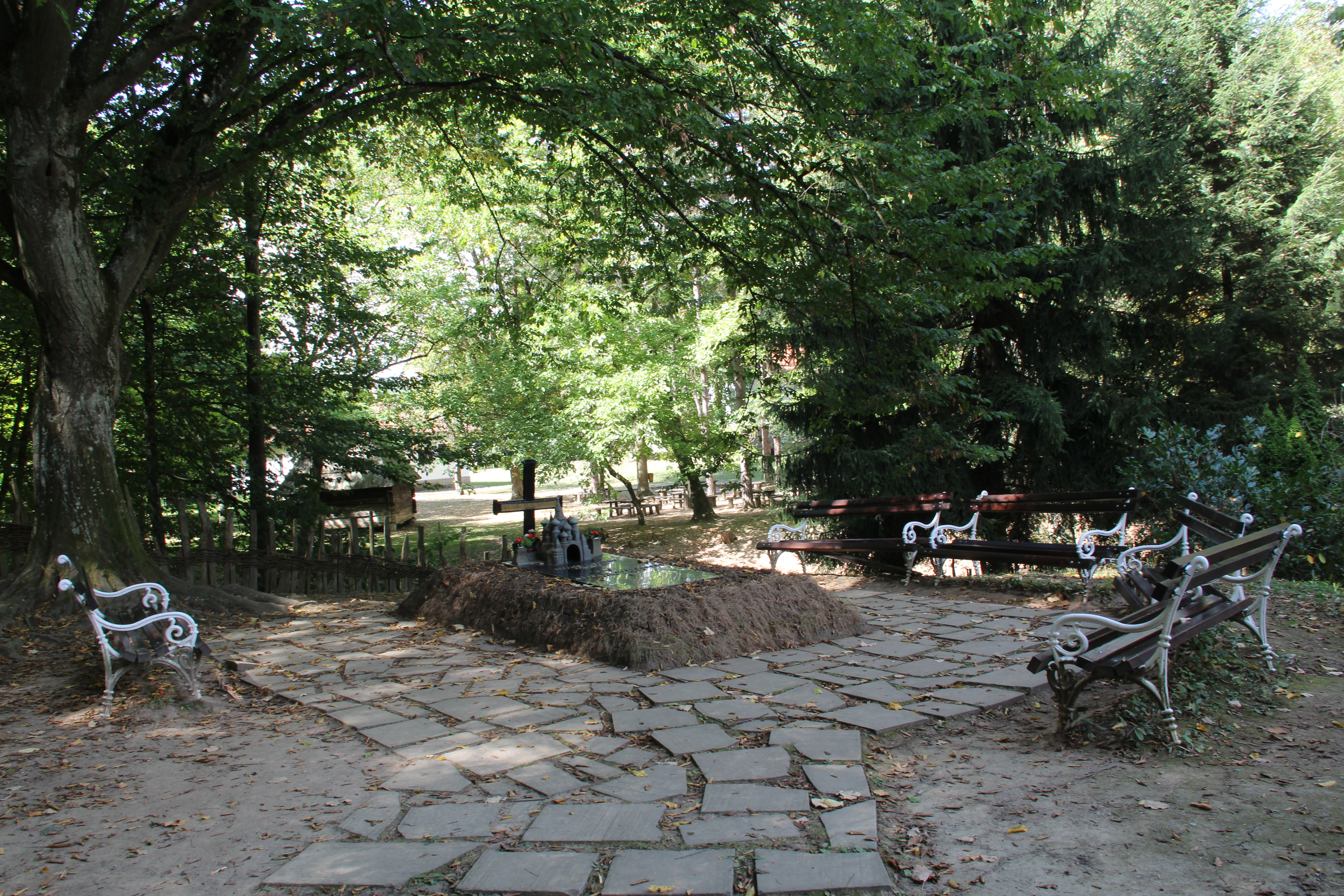
Grave of Desanka Maksimović

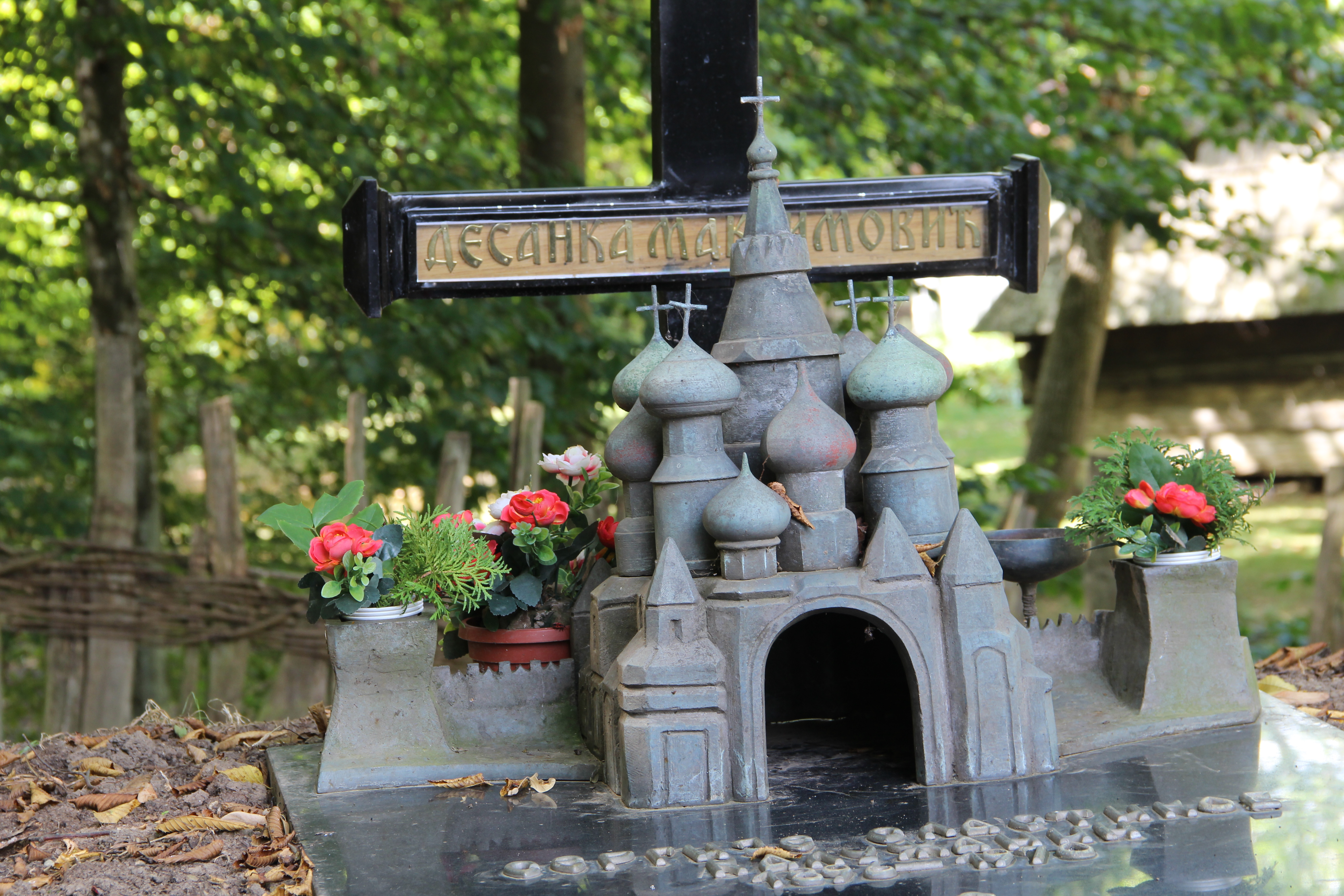
Grave of Desanka Maksimović

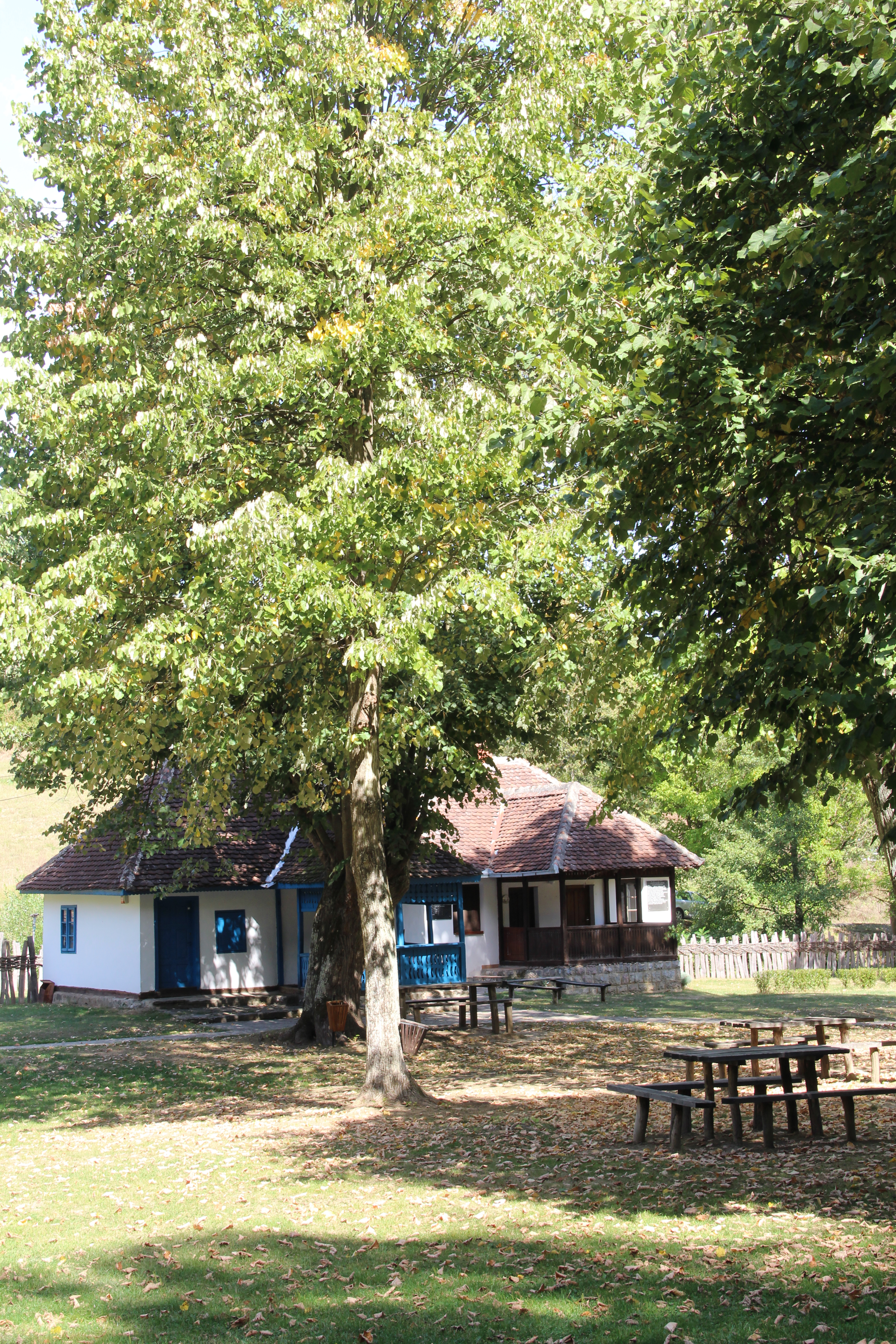
Brankovina - Cultural-historical complex

== See also ==
- Valjevo
- Historic Landmarks of Great Importance
