= Nikolajević =

Nikolajević (Serbian: Николајевић) is a Serbian surname, a patronymic derived from the male given name Nikolaj. Some notable people with this surname include:

- Svetomir Nikolajević (1844–1922), Serbian scholar and politician
- Petar Nikolajević Moler (1775–1816), Serbian politician and revolutionary
- Georgije Nikolajević (1807–1896), Metropolitan of Dabar-Bosna
- Nikola Nikolajević (1780–1842), Serbian revolutionary
- Milivoj J. Nikolajević (1861–1936), Serbian general
