= Tanja Kragujević =

Serbian poet (born 1946)

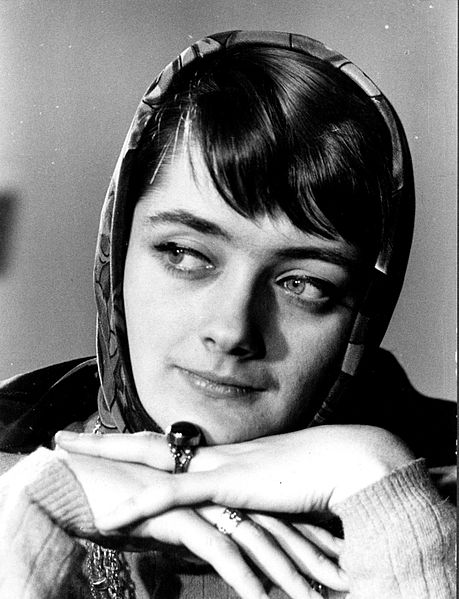
- Born: 26 October 1946 (age 79); Senta, PR Serbia, FPR Yugoslavia
- Occupations: Poet, writer
- Writing career
- Period: 1966–present
- Genre: Poetry

Tanja Kragujević (Serbian Cyrillic: Тања Крагујевић; born 26 October 1946) is a Serbian poet. She was born in Senta, northern Vojvodina. She has been a member of the Serbian Literary Society since its foundation in 2001. By the decision of the Government of Serbia, on 24 December 2009, she was awarded the title of top artist in the field of literature. She lives in Zemun.

== Education ==
She finished the first grade of primary school in Senta, and continued her education in Belgrade in the primary school "Vuk Karadzic" and in the Second Belgrade High School. She graduated in 1970, and earned her MA in 1973 at the Belgrade Faculty of Philology, Department of General Literature and Literary Theory. Her Master's thesis, dedicated to one of the most important Serbian poets Momčilo Nastasijević, was published in the form of an essay in the prestigious Argus edition, publishing house "Vuk Karadzic", 1976. She has been represented in numerous anthologies of contemporary Serbian poetry in the country and abroad.

== Literary work ==
At age 20, Kragujević's first book of poetry was published by one of the oldest publishing houses ("Matica Srpska", Novi Sad, in 1966) and appeared in The First Book collection. Since then she has published 19 collections of poetry, most recently Hleb od ruža (The Bread of Roses) which came out published by KOV, Vršac (2012).

The first book of poems, Vratio se Volodja (Volodja has come Back), was illustrated with the photographs by Kragujević's father, an art photographer and photojournalist of Politika newspaper, Stevan Kragujević, while the monograph "Kragujević, Senta koje više nema" ("Kragujević, Senta that no Longer Exists"), was published on the occasion of the tercentenary celebration of the town of Senta by the Kulturno-obrazovni centar "Torzo Lajoš iz Sente", 1997. The book was composed of artistic photographs by Stevan Kragujević and illustrated by the verses of his daughter and appeared in the amended version of the special poetry collection under the title Pejsaži nevidljivog ("The Landscapes of the Invisible") KOV, Vršac, 2001).

The first selection from her complete poetical works was published by "Agora" (Zrenjanin, 2009). The selected and new poems, entitled Staklena trava (Glass Grass), was edited and the afterword was written by the poet and literary critic Nenad Šaponja. Within Edicija dobitnika književne nagrade Milica Stojadinović Srpkinja (Edition of the Winners of Literary Award of Milica Stojadinovic – Serb), published by Zavod za kulturu Vojvodine (the Cultural Institute of Vojvodina), 2010, a new selection of her poetry, called "Ruža, zaista" ("Rose, indeed"), appeared edited and with the afterword by the literary critic and essayist Dragana Beleslin.

A collection of her works was published in 2017 by the endowment of “Desanka Maksimović” and the National Library of Serbia.

== Kragujević family legacy ==
On the 50th anniversary of the publication of Kragujević's first poetry book Vratio se Volodja, Istorijski arhiv Beograda (Historical Archives of Belgrade) staged the exhibition with the same name. The author of the lay out, Isidora Stojanović, presented the author's books, anthologies, rewards, artefacts and photos which constitute a part of Kragujević family legacy and mark the life, editorial and creative work of the poet. The special segments of the exhibition refer to the family, friends and associates, their letters, photos, books with inscriptions, gifts, rare books, and various items that are considered integral parts of this legacy.

== Translations ==
Her poems have been translated into German, English, French, Spanish, Hungarian, Dutch, Bulgarian, Macedonian, Russian, Belarusian, Italian, Slovenian, Polish, Japanese, and Greek. Especially interesting is the publication entitled Staklena trava (Glass Grass), collection of seven poems in seven languages (French, German, Greek, Hungarian, Italian, Japanese, Spanish), published by Agora, Zrenjanin, 2012. She is present in thematic and other anthologies home and abroad, representing Serbian poetry today, inter alia: Poesia Serbia hoy, Debats (institutció Alfons el Magnànim, Valencia, n.109 2010/4) and Les Poètes de la Mediterannée (preface by Yves Bonnefoy, Gallimar & Culturesfrance, 2010); Hundert grams Seele, Ten Decagrams of Soul, The Anthology of Serbian Poetry of the Second Part of the Twentieth Century (edited by Robert Hodel, Leipziger Literaturverlag, 2011), The Anthology of Serbian Poetry of XX and XXI Century (Herg Benet Publishers, Bucharest, 2012), El Color de la Esencia (Monográfico de Poesía Serbia Contemporánea—the Monography of Contemporary Serbian Poetry (Silvia Monrós de Stojakovic, Anfora Nova, Nova, Rute, Córdoba, Spain, 2013).

== Editing ==
- She edited a children's book written by Desanka Maksimovic Patuljak Kukuruzović (Dwarf Kukuruzović) and Bajka o putevima (The Tale of the Roads) – illustrated with the pictures by Janez Smole, Zavod za udžbenike i nastavna sredstva and Narodna knjiga, Beograd,)1979.
- The testamentary book of verse of modern classic Srba Mitrović (1931–2007), Magline, Sazveždja (Nebulae, constellations, Rad, Beograd, 2007), for which she wrote the afterword.

== Publishing work ==
For more than fifteen years she has been engaged in publishing work. As the editor (Narodna knjiga, Beograd), she has created several collections of books of modern literature, collected and selected works by world outstanding authors (Works by Antoine de Saint-Exupéry, 1981; Works by Marina Tsvetaeva, 1990), edition Alpha Lyrae, dedicated to the most important names of the modern world poetry (H.L.Borges, Philip Larkin, Sylvia Plath, Czesław Miłosz, Janis Ricos, H.M. Enzesberger, Tadeusz Różewicz, Joseph Brodsky, Wisława Szymborska, [Adam Zagajewski, Charles Simic, and others). She is the Editor of the book collection "Ariel" in the publishing house "Agora" who publishes the works of the most outstanding poets in the world (Lucija Stupica, Stanisław Barańczak, Tasos Livaditis, Sarah Kirsch and others). The book Kutija za mesečinu (The Box for Moonlight), was published in 2003. KOV, Vršac.

== Published books ==
=== Poetry ===
- Vratio se Volođa. With the photographs by Stevan Kragujević. Edicija "Prva knjiga". Matica srpska, Novi Sad, 1966.
- Nesan. Sa grafičkim prilozima Lazara Vujaklije. Bagdala, Kruševac,1973. Stud. Prosveta, Beograd, 1978.
- Samica. Nolit, Beograd, 1986.
- Osmejak omčice. KOV, Vršac, 1993.
- Divlji bulevar. Rad, Beograd, 1993.
- Muška srma. Srpska književna zadruga, Beograd, 1993.
- Duša trna. Sa crtežima Mihaila Đokovića Tikala. Prosveta, Niš, 1995.
- Osmejak pod stražom. KOV, Vršac, 1995.
- Autoportret, sa krilom. Prosveta, Beograd, 1996.
- Slovočuvar i slovočuvarka. Prosveta, Beograd, 1998.
- Pejzaži nevidljivog. KOV, Vršac, 2001.
- Godine, pesme. Edicija "Povelja". Biblioteka Stefan Prvovenčani, Kraljevo, 2002.
- Pismo na koži. Rad, Beograd, 2002.
- Njutnov dremež. Književno društvo Sveti Sava, Beograd, 2004.
- Žena od pesme. KOV, Vršac, 2006.
- Plavi sneg. KOV, Vršac, 2008.
- Staklena trava. Izabrane pesme. Biblioteka "Arijel", knjiga 1. Agora, Zrenjanin, 2009. (Glass grass . Selected and New Poems. Library "Ariel", Vol. 1, Edited and afterword written by Nenad Šaponja. Cover photograph: Stevan Kragujević, A Road Across the Plains).
- Ruža, odista. Zavod za kulturu Vojvodine. 2010. (Selected Poems. Selected and afterword written by Dragana Beleslijin)
- Motel za zbogom. Biblioteka "Stefan Prvovenčani", Kraljevo, 2010.
- Hleb od ruža. KOV, Vršac, 2012.
- Od svetlosti, od prašine, Književna akademija Istok, Knjaževac, 2014.
- Efekat leptira, Kulturni centar Novog Sada, 2016.
- Corona, Small Poems. Afterword: Jovica Aćin. Cover: Alan Bećiri, Tisa Flower. Illustrations: Maja Simić. Čigoja, Beograd, 2017.
- Efekat leptira, Ratković's poetry evenings, Bijelo Polje, 2018.
- Extravaganza, poems. Book cover: Stevan Kragujević, Scattered Light, shadows, Belgrade, Afterword: Slavko Gordić. Publishers: Čigoja and the author. Beograd, 2019.

== Selected poems ==
- Staklena trava. Izabrane i nove pesme. Biblioteka "Arijel", knj. 1. Priredio i pogovor napisao Nenad Šaponja. Agora, Zrenjanin, 2009. (Glass grass . Selected and New Poems. Book collection "Ariel", Vol. 1, Edited and afterword written by Nenad Šaponja).
- Ruža, odista. Izabrane pesme. Edicija dobitnika književne nagrade Milica Stojadinović Srpkinja. Izbor i pogovor. Dragana Belesliijn Zavod za kulturu Vojvodine, Novi Sad, 2010. (Rose, indeed . Selected Poems. Edition of the Winners of literary award Milica Stojadinovic Serb. The selection and afterword by. Dragana Beleslijin)
- Trn o svili (2016), author's choice. Edition "Desanka Maksimović Reward", Book 21, "Desanka Maksimović" Foundation and Narodna biblioteka Srbije, Beograd (The National Library of Serbia, Belgrade), 2016

=== Special monograph ===
- Stevan Kragujević i Tanja Kragujević: Senta koje više nema, KOC "Turzo Lajoš", Senta, 1997. Izdanje povodom 300. godišnjice grada Sente. Fotografije: Stevan Kragujević. Stihovi: Tanja Kragujević. (Monograph – "Kragujević, Senta that no Longer Exists", published on the occasion of the tercentenary celebration of the town of Senta. Photographs: Stevan Kragujević; verses: Tanja Kragujević.

=== Essays ===
- Mitsko u Nastasijevićevom delu. Biblioteka "Argus". Vuk Karadžić, Beograd, 1976.
- Dodir paunovog pera. Knjiga čitanja. Rad, Beograd, 1994.
- Trepet i čvor. Druga knjiga čitanja. Rad, Beograd, 1997.
- Orfej iz teretane. Treća knjiga čitanja. Prosveta, Beograd, 2001.
- Božanstvo pesme. Eseji o poeziji Miodraga Pavlovića, Ivana V. Lalića, Aleksandra Ristovića, Srbe Mitrovića, Dušana Vukajlovića i Nenada Šaponje. Prosveta, Beograd, 1999.
- Kutija za mesečinu. Mali eseji. KOV, Vršac, 2003.
- Svirač na vlati trave. Eseji. AGORA, Zrenjanin, 2006.
- Izgovoriti zvezdu. Mali eseji. AGORA, Zrenjanin, 2010.
- Talog nedovršenog. Minuete. Književna opština Vršac, 2010.
- Telegrami i molitve, AGORA, Zrenjanin 2015.
- Proći ispod čarobnog luka, essays and lyrical notes, Tanesi, Beograd, 2018.
- Putnik ka omegi (Three poets, three essays: Ewa Zonenberg, Tоny Hoagland, Wislawa Szymborska, Čigoja, Beograd, Kuća poezije, Banja Luka, 2018.

The book of essays about modern Serbian poets Božanstvo pesme /(Divinity of Poem)/(about the poetry of outstanding Serbian poets – Miodrag Pavlović, Ivan V. Lalić, Aleksandar Ristović, Srba Mitrović, Dušan Vukajlović and Nenad Šaponja) was published by Belgrade Publishing House "Prosveta", 1999. The book Svirač na vlati trave (A Player on a Blade of Grass), Agora, 2006, deals with the poetry of Desimir Blagojević, Miloš Crnjanski, Vasko Popa, Srba Mitrović, Miroljub Todorović and Nikola Vujčić. Her essay about native and world literature, broadcast on Radio Berlgrade (Channel 2) were collected in three Books of Reading Poetry (Knjige čitanja), published in Belgrade, 1994, 1997, 2001. A small collection of texts on modern world and native poetical works entitled Izgovoriti zvezdu (Pronouncing a Star), was published by "Agora" (Ogledalo edition), 2010, and KOV Vršac published a new book of her lyrical lines and micro-essays entitled Talog nedovršenog (The Residuum of the Unfinished).

== Translated poetry ==
- Staklena trava (Glass Grass), collection of seven poems in seven languages (French, German, Greek, Hungarian, Italian, Japanese, Spanish), published by Agora, Zrenjanin, 2012. Cover photograph: Stevan Kragujević, A Road Across the Plain.
- Recollection of Silk. Selected poems from The Bread of Roses collection. In Serbian and the translations into English (Marija Knežević), French (Marilyne Bertoncini) and Spanish (Silvia Monrós de Stojaković. About The Bread of Roses (afterword) Vasa Pavković, Afterward translation into English : Nikola S. Krznarić. Cover photo: Katarina Alempijević. Linea Alba III, paper object. Photo of the poetess: Živko Nikolić. Književno društvo „Sveti Sava“ (Literary Society „St. Sava“), series- „Druga obala“, 2015.

== Rendered poetry ==
- Kajetan Kovič. Pesme. Izbor i pogovor Jože Snoj. Prevod Tatjana Detiček. Prepev Tanja Kragujević. Narodna knjiga, Beograd, 1974. (Kajetan Kovič, Poems. Selected and afterword written by Jože Snoj. Translated by Tatjana Detiček-Vujasinović. Rendered by Tanja Kragujević, narodna Knjiga, Beograd, 1977.)
- Tone Pavček, Pesme. Izbor i pogovor Tode Čolak. Prevod Tatjana Detiček-Vujasinović. Prepev Tanja Kragujević. Narodna knjiga, Beograd, 1977. (Tone Pavček, Poems. Selected and afterword written by Tode Čolak. Translated by Tatjana Detiček-Vujasinović. Rendered by Tanja Kragujević, Narodna Knjiga, Beograd, 1977.)
- Svetlana Makarovič: Pesme. Izbor, prevod i pogovor Marija Mitrović. Prepev Tanja Kragjević. Narodna knjiga, Beograd, 1977. (Svetlana Makarovič, Poems. (Selected, translated and afterword written by Marija Mitrović. Rendered by Tanja Kragujević, Narodna Knjiga, Beograd, 1977.)
- Marina Cvetajeva, Dela, Narodna knjiga 1990, priredila Milica Nikolić. Knjiga I, Pesme i poeme. (Marina Tsvetaeva, Works, Narodna Knjiga 1990. Selected Poems. Edited by Milica Nikolić. Translated by: Olga Vlatković, Mirjana Vukmirović, Jelica Drenovac, Danilo Kiš, Zlata Kocić, Tanja Kragujević, Ljudmila Lisina. Book collection "Atlas vetrova", Književna opština Vršac, 1997.
- Marina Cvetajeva: Pohvala vremenu. Izabrane pesme. Priredila Milica Nikolić. Preveli: Olga Vlatković, Mirjana Vukmirović, Jelica Drenovac, Danilo Kiš, Zlata Kocić, Tanja Kragujević, Ljudmila Lisina. Biblioteka “Atlas vetrova”, Književna opština Vršac, 1997.(Marina Tsvetaeva, In Praise of Time. Selected poems. Edited by Milica Nikolić. Translated by: Olga Vlatković, Mirjana Vukmirović, Jelica Drenovac, Danilo Kiš, Zlata Kocić, Tanja Kragujević, Ljudmila Lisina. Book collection “Atlas vetrova”, Književna opština Vršac, 1997.

She has worked in collaboration with translators on a number of rendered poems, and participated in the translation of Marina Tsvetaeva's verses, included in the Anthology of translations by Miodrag Sibinović: : Antologija ruske lirike X-XXI vek, knjiga II (Prva četvrtina – sredina XX veka; Marina Cvetajeva, "Duša", prevod Ljudmina Lisina, prepev Tanja Kragujević, str. 132). Paideia, Beograd, 2007 (An Anthology of Russian poetry X-XXI Century, Volume II – First Quarter – mid-twentieth century, Marina Tsvetaeva, " Soul ", translation: Ljudmina Lisina, rendered by: Tanja Kragujević, p. 132), Paidea, Belgrade, 2007.

== Internet anthology ==
Since 10 April 2009, the verses of Tanja Kragujević can be found on the world's largest Internet poetry presentation, Lyrikline.org.

== Awards ==
- "Brankova nagrada" (1966)
- "Isidora Sekulić" (1976) – essays
- Plaque of the City of Belgrade (1984), hometown plaque award for literary and cultural contribution (1968)
- "Đura Jakšić" (1993) – poetry
- "Milan Bogdanović" (1996) – literary criticism
- "Milica Stojadinović Srpkinja" (2009) – poetry
- "The seal of the town of Sremski Karlovci", 2013, for the best book of poetry published in 2012 (collection Bread of roses, KOV, Vršac, 2012)
- "Rade Tomić" Reward (2014) for the manuscript of the book entitled Od svetlosti od prašine
- Desanka Maksimović Prize (2015) for the whole contribution to Serbian poetry
- "Lenkin prsten" (2015) for the best love poem published in the same year (the poem "Voda")
- "Gračanička povelja" (2016)
- "Risto Ratković" award for the collection of poems Butterfly Effect, 2017
- "Rade Drainac" award for poetry collection Extravaganza, 2020
- "Jefimijin vez" award, 2025
