= Stevan Kragujević =

Serbian photojournalist and art photographer (1922–2002)

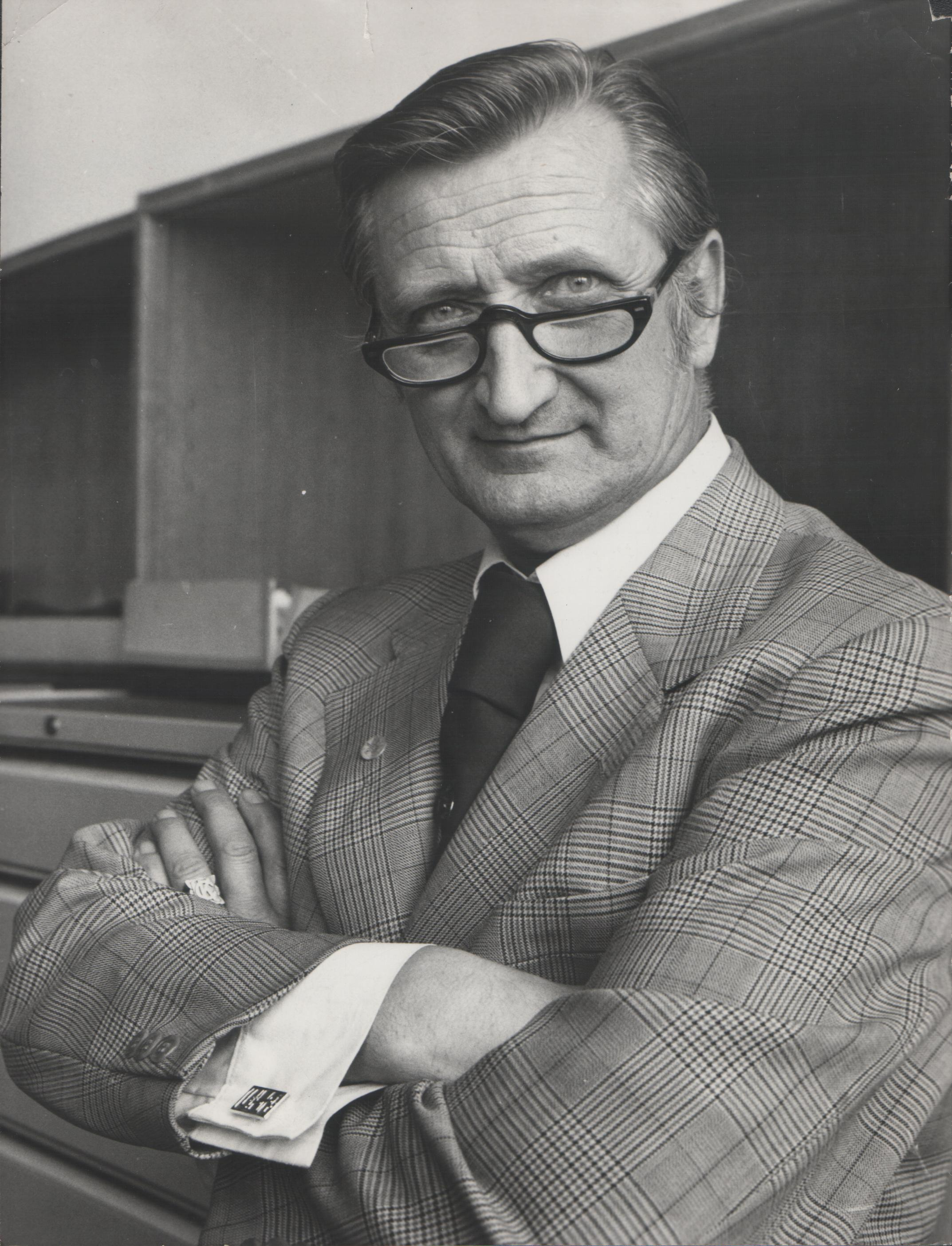
- Kragujević in 1976
- Born: 4 February 1922; Senta, Kingdom of Serbs, Croats and Slovenes
- Died: 17 April 2002 (aged 80); Belgrade, FR Yugoslavia
- Occupations: Photojournalist and art photographer
- Writing career
- Period: 1950–2002

Stevan Kragujević (Serbian Cyrillic: Стеван Крагујевић; 4 February 1922 – 17 April 2002) was a Serbian photojournalist and art photographer.

== Career ==
Kragujević was born on 4 February 1922, in Senta, Kingdom of Serbs, Croats and Slovenes. He began practicing photography at the age of 14 upon the insistence of his father. He started in a small studio in his hometown before moving to Belgrade where he eventually started to work as a professional for the Tanjug agency.

His first notable photograph was of the destroyed bridge in Senta during World War II he took at the age of 19. In 1943, he bought a colour film and used it only for the most valuable shots, one of which was "A Goose-girl", a photo of a young woman with a basket and geese in a Vojvodina alley. The photo, entitled "A Motif from Vojvodina Village" was published on the front cover of "Duga" magazine, in 1950. It was Yugoslavia's first illustrated magazine with the first front cover in colour.

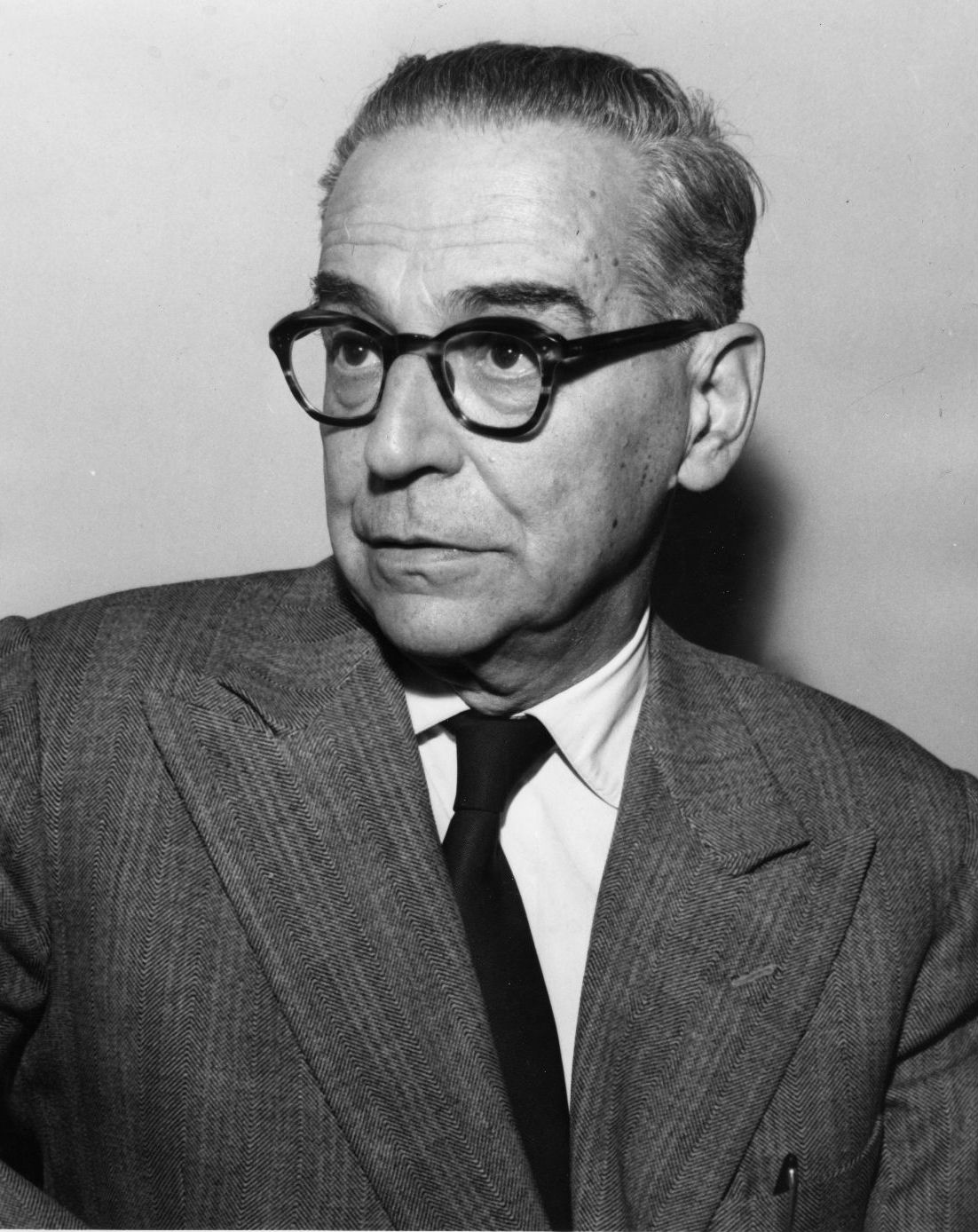
Photograph of Ivo Andrić

He was the first photojournalist hired by the newly formed Information Agency at the Presidium of SFRY. Kragujević became a member of the selected team of photographers in Tanjug (1951–1953), and from 1953 until retirement in 1982 a photojournalist and photo editor of the daily newspaper "Politika".

In 1950 Kragujević made the first official portrait of President Tito, intended for foreign embassies and correspondents. He would go on to accompany Tito in foreign trips where he would take photographs of him. Tito's entourage would carefully curate the photographs that were intended for official use.

Over his career, Kragujević accumulated a rich stock of photos of President Tito, covering his trips around the country, visits to various companies, meetings with foreign statesmen, along with a series of casual anthological, unofficial ones. Because of that, many people considered him Tito's personal photographer – which he was not.

During his work in "Politika", especially in the period of modernization (after moving to the new, present-day building) he held other important positions – Chief of the Photolaboratory and Photo department of the company. For a long time he was the head of the Photo department, passed on his experience on his younger colleagues, and organized the work of the photo editorial office. Until his retirement, he was also a photo editor and helped in introducing a new section in "Politika", especially the one stressing the real value and importance of photography U slici i reči (In pictures and words).

== Photographic documentation ==
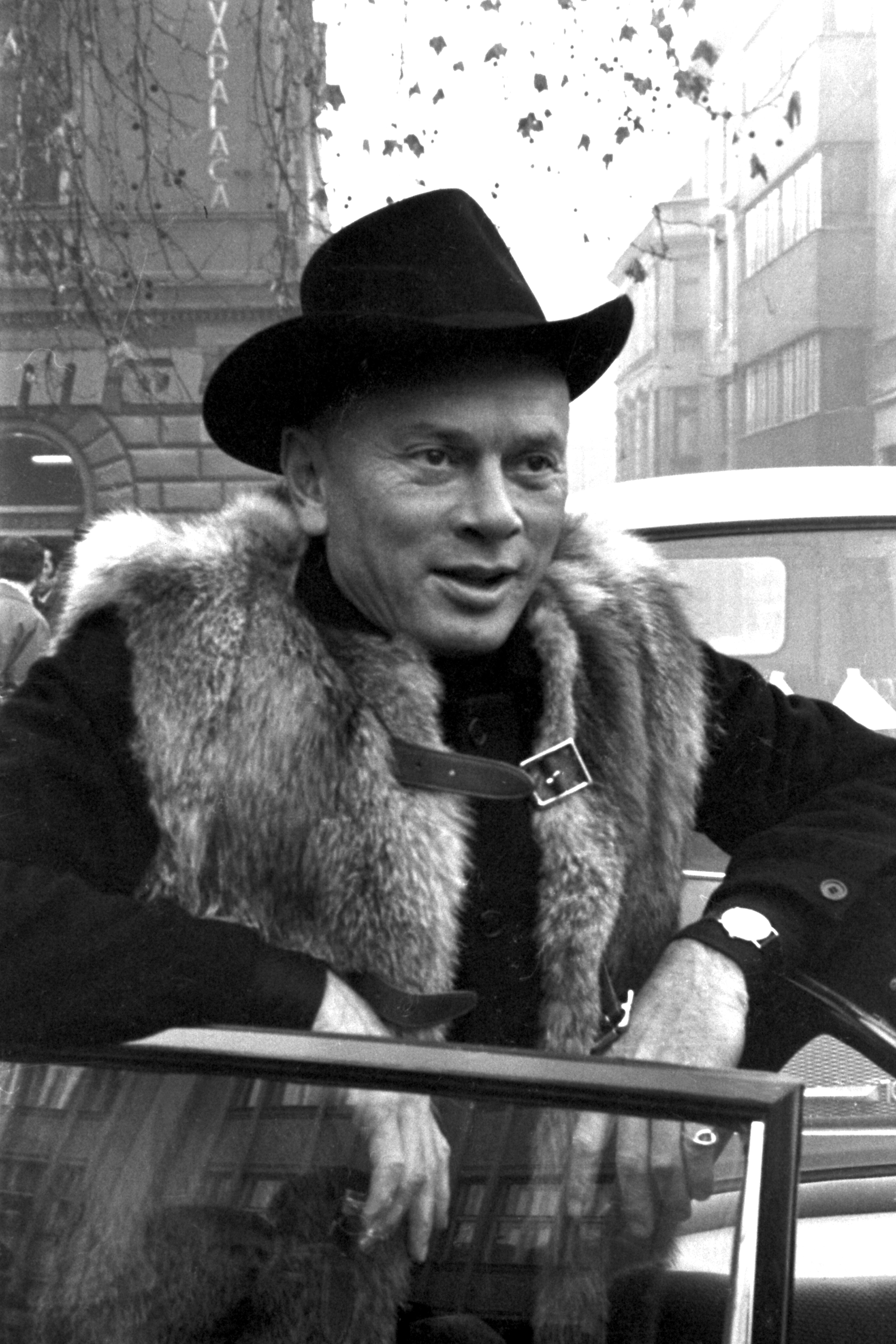
Photograph of Yul Brynner in Sarajevo

Through his extensive portfolio, Kragujević documented the historical development of Yugoslavia, working as a photojournalist at major political, cultural, artistic, and sporting events. As an accredited correspondent, he covered the Yugoslav Assembly, party and union conventions, May Day parades, and Youth Day. He also documented the formation of the Non-Aligned Movement in Brioni in 1956, the 1968 student protests, and major events such as the 1963 Skopje earthquake.

The gallery of his portraits of politicians, statesmen and monarchs in the second half of the twentieth century, who visited Yugoslavia at that time include Nehru, Muammar Gaddafi, Nasser, Indira Gandhi, Khrushchev, Edward Kennedy, Elizabeth II, the British Queen, the Greek Royal Couple, and also other outstanding persons in the field of science, literature, film and sports such as American astronaut Neil Armstrong, opera star Mario del Monaco, chess magician Robert Fischer, film stars Laurence Olivier, Gérard Philipe, Yves Montand, Elizabeth Taylor, Orson Welles, Yul Brynner, as well as a lot of artists and legends in the country, musicians, actors and writers – Nobel Laureate Ivo Andrić, Branko Ćopić, Desanka Maksimović, Dobrica Ćosić, Vasko Popa.

=== Exhibitions ===
He took part at numerous international and Yugoslav exhibitions, and was also the author of special one- man shows, most often dedicated to his home town Senta. His first solo exhibition – One hundred photographs by Stevan Kragujević was held in his native town Senta from April 28 to May 5, 1956. The last exhibition, in the Museum of the Town of Senta in March 2000, next to 65- year jubilee of dealing with photography – symbolically represented Stevan's whole work.

== Legacy ==
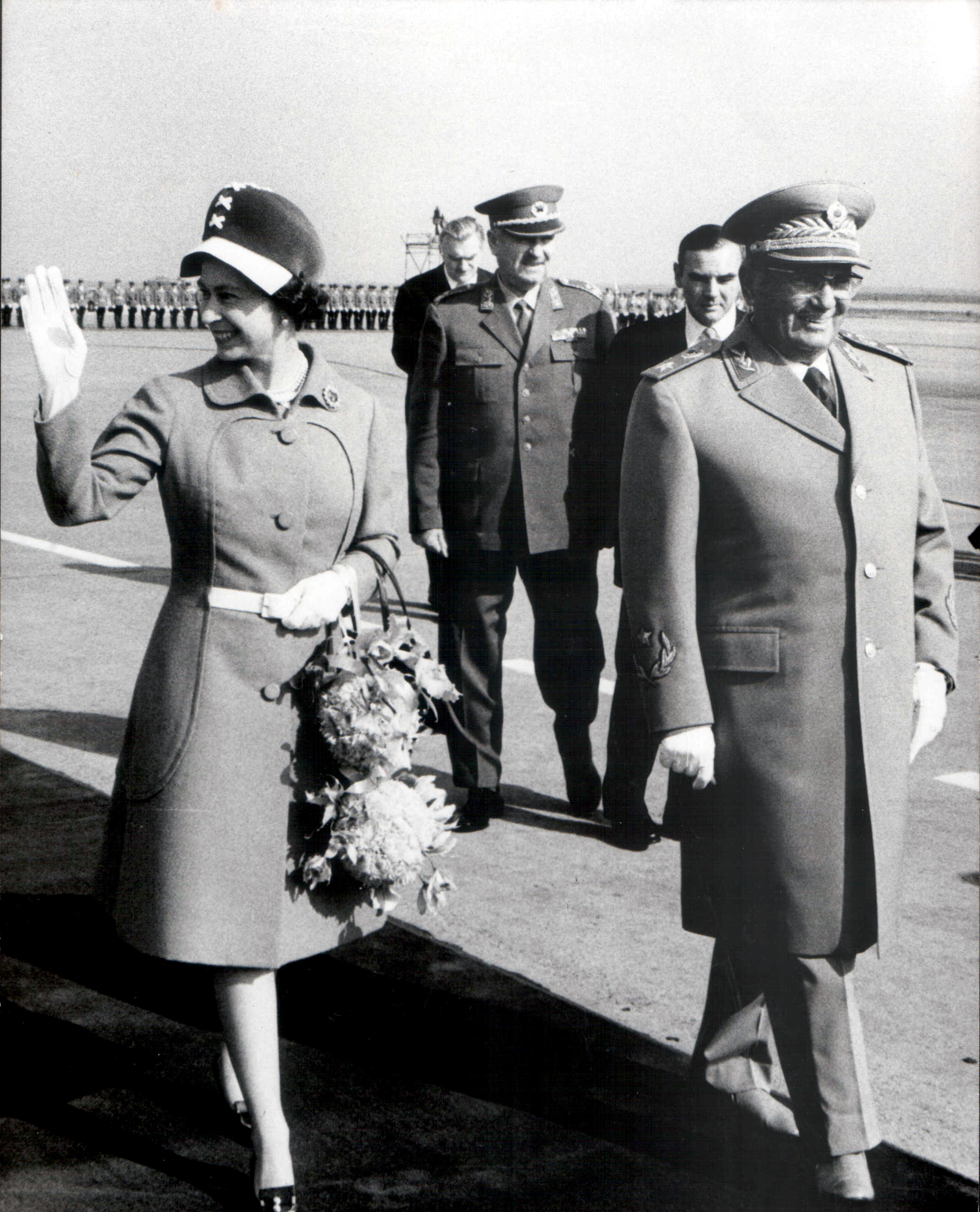
Photograph of Elizabeth II and Josip Broz Tito in Belgrade

One of the most important books on the life and work of Stevan Kragujević was published posthumously, marking his passing. The photo monograph entitled Prostor večnosti (The Space of Eternity) was edited by Borivoj Mirosavljević and was published in the series Zlatno oko (The Golden Eye) by Foto i kino savez Vojvodine, Novi Sad, 2003 (Photo and Cinema Association of Vojvodina), and supported by the City Assembly of Senta. The book was promoted in April 2003 in Senta, Belgrade and Novi Sad, followed by exhibitions of his most significant works.

In 2015, Stevan Kragujević's bequest, containing almost 10,000 photographs, negatives, and private objects, was established at the Museum of Yugoslavia. The photo collection includes black and white color negatives in various formats, documenting events ranging from President Tito's activities to the political, economic, cultural, and sports life of Yugoslavia. The legacy also contains materials pertaining to Kragujević's professional life, including letters, documents, press articles, catalogues, awards, and recognitions.

== Authorial works ==
=== Books with the works of Stevan Kragujević ===
- Turnir nacija, IX šahovska olimpijada, Dubrovnik, 1950. Izdanje Šahovskog saveza Jugoslavije, 1950.
- Tanja Kragujević: Vratio se Volođa. Edicija "Prva knjiga", Matica srpska, Novi Sad, 1966. Sa fotosima Stevana Kragujevića.
- Momčilo Stevanović: Titov putokaz. Fotografije: Stevan Kragujević. Dečje novine, Gornji Milanovac, 1977.
- Momčilo Stefanović, Stevan Kragujević: Ljubav bez granica. Tito i pioniri. Izdavač: NIRO “Mladost”, Beograd. Suizdavač: Savet Saveza pionira Jugoslavije. Oprema: Nenad Čonkić. Beograd, 1980.
- Mirko Arsić, Dragan R. Marković: 68.Studentski bunt i društvo. Fotografije: Stevan Kragujević'. Novinska organizacija “Prosvetni pregled”, Beograd, Istraživačko-izdavački centar SSO Srbije. Urednici: Milivoje Pavlović, Velimir Ćurguz Kazimir. Recenzenti: Dušan Janjić, Karel Turza. Grafička i likovna oprema: Brano Gavrić. Fotografije Stevan Kragujević. Beograd, 1984.
- Kragujević. Senta koje više nema. Sa stihovima Tanje Kragujević iz zbirke "Pejzaži nevidljivog". Povodom 300-te godišnjice bitke kod Sente. Kulturno-obrazovni centar "Turzo Lajoš" i štamparija "Udarnik", Senta, 1997.

=== Important publications with the author’s works ===
- SKOPJE, 1963. Urednik: Jovan Popovski. Crtež na ovitku izradio Vasilije Popović-Cico. Fotografije: Kiro Georgievski, Blagoja Drnkov, Kiro Bilbilovski, Cvetko Ivanovski, Slave Kaspinov, Edo Meršinjak, Kočo Nedkov, Foto “Nova Makedonija”, Nikola Bibić, Jovan Ritopečki, Gogo Popov, Aleksandar Minčev, Steva Kragujević, Drago Rendulić Izdavač: Agencija za fotodokumentaciju, Zagreb, 1963.
- YUGOSLAV FEDERAL ASSEMBLY. Belgrade, 1965. Board of Editors: Živan Mitrović, Branko Kostić, Dragoljub Đurović. Editor: Dragoljub Đurović. Photographs by: Miodrag Đorđević, Stevan Kragujević. Lay-out by: Ante Šantić. Translated by: DR Marko Pavičić. Published by: “Mladost”, Beograde, Maršala Tita 2. Štampa: Grafičko preduzuće “Slobodan Jović”, Beograd.
- SKUPŠTINA SFRJ, Beograd, 1978. Izdaje: Sekretarijat za informacije Skupštine SFRJ. Pripremili i uredili Aleksandar Petković, Dragoljub Đurović. Sarađivali: Branko Kostić. Željko Škalamera (na tekstu o zgradi Skupštine SFRJ). Fotografije: Miodrag Đorđević, Ivo Eterović, Stevan Kragujević, Tomislav Peternek, Žorž Skrigin, Tanjug. Tehniči urednik Sveta Mandić. Izdavač: “Turistička štampa “, Beograd. Štampa: Beogradski izdavačko-grafički zavod, Beograd.
- TITO U PRIRODI I LOVU. Izdavač: Izdavačko instruktivni biro, Zagreb. Monogorafiju pripremilo Beogradsko lovačko društvo, Beograd.1980.
- TITO. ILUSTROVANA BIOGRAFIJA. Uvod: Pavle Savić. Tekst: Rajko Bobot. Recenzent: Jovo Kapičić. Umetnički urednik Miodrag Vartebedijan. Fotografije:Branibor Debeljković, Ivo Eterović, Džon Filips, Historijski arhiv Bjelovar, Radovan Ivanović, Duško Jovanović, Stevan Kragujević, Mirko Lovrić, Dimitrije Manolev, Muzej grada Beograda, Muzej revolucije naroda i narodnosti Jugoslavije, Milan Pavić, Miloš Rašeta, Žorž Skrigin, Aleksandar Stojanović, Filmoteka Osjek, Foto Tanjug, Žirovrad Vučić. Izdavaći: Jugoslovenska revija. Beograd, Vuk Karadžić, Beograd. Štampa: Mladinska knjiga, Ljubljana, 1980, 1981.
- TITO U KRUŠEVCU. Bagdala, Kruševac, 1981.
- Đorđe Kablar: Crvena kolonija. Povodom 40. godišnjice pobede nad fašizmom. Senta. Deo fotografija snimio Stevan Kragujević. 1985.
- PISAC U FOTOGRAFIJI. IVO ANDRIĆ 1892–1975. Povodom izložbe Muzeja grada Beograda i Salona fotografije. Izdavač: Muzej grada Beograda, posebna izdanja, 1985.
- Radovan Popović: Ivo Andrić, Život. Autori fotografija: Piotr Barqcz, Foto Tanjug, Mladen Grčević, RTV Beograd, Vojni muzej JNA, Arhiv grada Beograda, Đorđe Popović, Dimitar Manolev, Stevan Kragujević, Rade Milojković, A. Aškania, Nikola Bibić, Budim Budimovski, Vojislav Beloica, Arhiv Josipa Broza Tita, Gvozden Jovanić, i drugi, neoznačeni autori.Zadružbina Ive Andrića, Beograd, 1988.
- Živojin Pavlović: Ispljuvak pun krvi. Biblioteka Zabrane! Kolo 1, knjiga 1. Urednik Miroslav Dereta, Dijana Dereta. Grafički atelje Dereta. Likovno grafička oprema: Živojin Pavlović, Miroslav Dereta, Neboša Rogić. Fotografija – korice, Stevan Kragujević. Beograd, 1990.Fotografije u knjizi: Stevan Kragujević, T. Peternek, D. Konstantinović, S. Sulejmanović, Ž. Pavlović, P. Otoranov
- Dragan Vlahović, Nataša Marković : Jovanka Broz – Život na dvoru. Fotografije Dragutin Grbić i Stevan Kragujević. Biblioteka “Misterije politike”. Akvarius, Novi Beograd, 1990.
- Tija voda. Edicija "Istorija poljoprivrede, salaša i sela", XI knjiga. Glavni urednik prof. dr Veselin Lazić. Izdavač: Kulutrno-istorijsko društvo "Proleće na čenejskim salašima", PČESA, Novi Sad, 1995.
- Komšija pa Bog. Edicija "Istorija poljoprivrede, salaša i sela", XII knjiga. PČESA, Novi Sad, 1996. Glavni urednik Prof. dr Veselin Lazić. Urednici: Prof. dr Miloš Marjanović, Milan Grujić, književnik. Izdavač: Kulutrno istorijsko društvo “Proleće na čenejskim salašima”. Štampa: Mala knjiga, Novi Sad, Bulevar Vojvode Stepe 137. Novi Sad, oktobar 1996.
- Pavlović, Živojin: Ispljuvak pun krvi, Dnevnik ' 68. Dnevnici, knjiga treća. Prometej, Novi Sad, Kwit podium, Beograd, 1999.
- Petar Terzić: Sremac. Izdavač: Kulturno-obrazovni centar "Turzo Lajoš", Senta, 2002.
- Petar Terzić: Srpska čitaonica u Senti 1868–1957. Izdavač : PP Rapido, Senta, i Kulutrno-obrazovni centar "Turzo Lajoš", Senta, 2002.
- Borivoj Mirosavljević : Vojvodina. Predeli i ljudi. Dnevnik, novine i časopisi. Novi Sad, 2005.
- Narodna biblioteka Srbje. Vodič. Izdanje Narodne biblioteke Srbije, 1973. (Izuzev fotosa iz istorijata Biblioteke I reprinta starih rukopisa, sve fotose novog zdanja Narodne biblioteke, svečano otvorene za javnost 6. aprila 1973. godine, načinio je Stevan Kragujević)

=== Anthologies, collections, lexicons ===
- Dragoljub Milivojević: “Politika” – svedok našeg doba 1904–1984. Narodna knjiga, Prosveta, Beograd. 1984.
- DVA VEKA SRPSKOG NOVINARSTVA. Institut za novinarstvo, Beograd, 1992.
- Borivoj Mirosavljević: Antologija fotografije Vojvodine, knjiga 1. Foto, kino i video savez Vojvodine, Novi Sad, 2000.
- Borivoj Mirosavljević: Antologija fotografije Vojvodine, knjiga 2, Foto, kino i video savez Vojvodine, Novi Sad, 2001.
- Borivoj Mirosavljević: Antologija fotografije Vojvodine, knjiga 3, Foto, kino i video savez Vojvodine, Novi Sad, 2002.
- Borivoj Mirosavljević: Antologija fotografije Vojovidne, knjiga 4, Foto, kino i video savez Vojvodine, Novi Sad, 2003.
- TANJUG, FOTO. 60 GODINA POSTOJANJA. Priredio Živorad Vućić. JP Novinska agenicija Tanjug. Beograd, 2003.
- STO FOTOREPORTERA POLITIKE. Vek Politike, 1904 – 2004. Publikacija povodom izložbe u Holu “Politike”, Beograd, 2004.
- Dušan Đurić: NOVINARSKI LEKSIKON, YU Marketing pres, Kompanija Novosti, Beograd, 2003.
- Borivoj Mirosavljević: Antologija fotografije Vojvodine, knjiga 5, Foto, kino i video savez Vojvodine, Novi Sad, 2004.
- Borivoj Mirosavljević: Antologija fotografije Vojvodine, knjiga 6, Foto, kino i video savez Vojvodine, Novi Sad, 2005.
- Goran Malić: Letopis srpske fotografije, 1939–2008. Fotogram, Beograd, 2009.
- Miško Šuvaković: ISTORIJA UMETNOSTI U SRBIJI, XX VEK. Drugi tom. Realizmi i modernizmi oko hladnog rata. O fotografiji: Jelena Matić/Fotografija socijalističkog realizma. Orion art, Beograd, 2012.
- ČUVARI USPOMENA I SVEDOCI ISTORIJE. FOTOREPORTERI VOJVODINE. GUARDIANS OF MEMORIES AND WITNESSES OF HISTORY. PHOTOJOURNALISTS OF VOJVODINA. Priredio Darko Dozet. Predgovor: Misija hrabrosti i podvig neponovljivosti, dr Draško Ređep; Slikom do istine, Borivoj Mirosavljević, majstor fotografije. Prevodi: Snežana Kovačić. Izdavač: Foto asocijacija Vojvodine. Dizajn i štampa Graphit plus doo. Novi Sad, 2014.

== Awards and acknowledgements ==
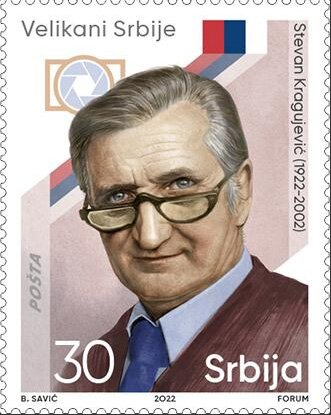
Kragujević on a 2022 stamp of Serbia

- Stevan Kragujević is a recipient of numerous awards for his journalist and art photography. Among others are the following:
- Silver Medal of the town of Senta, October 1967.
- Silver Medal of the town of Senta, October 1978.
- Gold Medal of Senta, October 8, 1982.
- “Politika” Award – golden watch, January 25, 1973
- Belgrade City Memorial Plaque and Diploma (thirty years of freedom, in recognition of work and dedication in the development of Belgrade, 1944–1974.
- Plaque for 25-year work in journalism in the Journalist Association of Yugoslavia
- Plaque for 25-year continuous work in “Politika”, January 25, 1978.
- Gold Medal on the occasion of the “Politika” jubilee, January 25, 1978.
- Gold Medal on the occasion of the „Politika“ jubilee, 1944–1984.
- Befu '85, 7th World Biennal of Photography, Belgrade, October 19 – November 2, 1985.
- Gold Badge of “Politika” on the occasion of 80 years of “Politika” photo department, February 1, 1987.

Special acknowledgements:

- Gold watch given by Josip Broz Tito, December 27, 1979.
- Senta Town Award, Pro Urbe, September 9, 2001.
- “Svetozar Marković” Life Achievement Award of the Journalist Association of Serbia, June 13, 1996, “for hundred thousands of photos of historical value and for dedicated life to the profession”.

== Sources ==
- Joksimovic, Milan; Rajović, Radošin (1970). Jugoslovenski savremenici: Ko je ko u Jugoslaviji [Yugoslav contemporaries: Who's who in Yugoslavia]. Biblioteka Leksikon. Belgrade: Hronometar.
