= Duško Novaković =

- Born: 1948 (age 77–78); Titograd, FPR Yugoslavia

Duško Novaković is a contemporary Serbian poet. He was born in 1948 in Titograd (modern Podgorica), FPR Yugoslavia.

== Biography ==
His father was a pilot and radio operator in the Royal Air Force during the Second World War. Patrilineal ancestors from the Aegean area settled in Macedonia, in Strumica, staying for some time on the Greek island of Thasos, then in Thessaloniki. His mother comes from a prominent family of Podgorica, Bracović-Zlatičanin. An exceptional voice, Ksenija Cicvarić, was and still is known as a top performer of Montenegrin, Serbian, and Muslim melodies. She was harassed and persecuted during the period when the poet's father, after the Cominform Resolution, was a political prisoner in a Stalinist prison camp in Jilava, Romania. The poet saw his father for the first time at the age of six, an event that later left a mark in his poetry - a kind of analogy of their own destiny with the myth of Odysseus and Telemachus.

He worked with the Yugoslav Airlines in various corporate transactions and was parallel poetry editor at newspapers and magazines: The literary word, Literature, Literary Gazette, Here.

His books have been translated into many languages, he is represented in numerous national and international anthologies, and recently in the anthology "The Horse has Six Legs", which was edited and translated by the renowned American poet of Serbian origin Charles Simic.

Duško Novaković was one of the initiators of the establishment of the Serbian Literary Society, and he is a member of the Serbian PEN Center.

=== Education ===
Novaković was educated in the former Yugoslav republics, now independent states, Macedonia, Montenegro, and Serbia, where he studied Yugoslav and world literature at the Faculty of Philology in Belgrade.

=== Personal life ===
He has two sons, Paul and David, lives and works in Belgrade as an independent artist.

== Literary works ==
He has published over fifteen books of poetry, of which the most famous are: „Znalac ogledala“, „Poderotine na vreći“, „Sati i životinje/Časovi i životni“ - in two languages, the Serbo-Croatian and Macedonian, „Dijalog o nemaru“, „Hodnikom“, „Nadzornik kvarta“, „ Stacionarije – pesme rata i mesečarenja“, „Dostavljeno muzama“, „Smetenjakov crtež“, „Tupan i njegov pedagog“, „Klupe nenagrađenih“, „ Kad ćemo svetla pogasiti“, also four selected poems: „Izabrao sam Mesec“, „Bioskop Limijer/Cinema Lumiere“ – bilingual, in Serbian and French, and a comprehensive selection of books published after 2000 - „Sećanje na prve ljude“ and „Zabava za utučene“, published by the Foundation Desanka Maksimovic and Publishing Centre of the National Library of Serbia.

He translates poetry and prose from Macedonian. He published "An Anthology of Contemporary Macedonian Poetry" and translated several books of contemporary independent Macedonian poets.

== Awards and honors ==
He has received numerous awards including: Milan Rakić, Mlada Struga, Zmaj Award, Branko Miljković, Disova, Danica Marković, Đura Jakšić, Vasko Popa Award, Risto Ratković, Istok - zapad, Desanka Maksimović Prize, for a poetic oeuvre, and awards and recognition from Belgrade for contribution to Serbian literature, and an award Barski ljetopis.

The critical articles of writer's poetry have been published in "Poetry of Duško Novaković" and the publication "Duško Novaković - Dis spring" as well as several thematic blocks in literary journals.

He was a participant and guest at some of the world famous festival of poetry, and lectured on contemporary poetry in the former Yugoslavia at the University of Tagore in India, in 1984, and lectured the poetry of Vasko Popa at Department of Slavonic Studies at the University of Vienna in 2008.
