= Morton Marcus =

American poet (1936–2009)

- ^{Photo by Jana Marcus}
- Born: September 10, 1936; New York City, New York, United States
- Died: October 28, 2009 (aged 73); Santa Cruz, California, United States
- Occupation: Poet
- Website: mortonmarcus.com

Morton Marcus (1936–2009) was an American poet. He also published a novel and a memoir.

== Biography ==
Marcus had more than 500 poems published in literary journals across the country, including Poetry (Chicago), TriQuarterly, Ploughshares, Chelsea, The Chicago Review, The Iowa Review, Zyzzyva, Poetry Northwest, and The Denver Quarterly. Four times his work was selected to appear in prize poetry annuals (The Borestone Mountain Awards of 1967 and 1975, and the 1985 and 1987 Anthology of Magazine Verse). His work has appeared in over 90 anthologies. He has also served as the poet in residence for several universities and led workshops at colleges across America. Marcus was also a long-time co-host of The Poetry Show on KUSP (a former Santa Cruz public radio station). It was the longest-running poetry radio show in the United States.

Outside of the literary world, Marcus created a sixteen-part television review of film Movie Milestones, which has been shown on cable networks throughout the United States, along with being the main visual source of film history at AFTRS, the Australian national film school. His film reviews became part of a television show, Cinema Scene, shown in the San Francisco Bay Area, which he co-hosted with Richard von Busack. In addition to writing and reviewing movies, Marcus also taught film and English at Cabrillo College in Santa Cruz.

He died of renal cancer on October 28, 2009.

== Legacy ==
Marcus's poetry archive, working papers, interviews, and correspondence are held in the Special Collections at University of California, Santa Cruz. The Morton Marcus Memorial Poetry Reading has become an established annual poetry reading series, bringing some of the most accomplished poets in the country to Santa Cruz County. This yearly event is held in November each year, is free to the public, and is sponsored by UC Santa Cruz, Cabrillo College, Ow Family Properties, Bookshop Santa Cruz, and the family of Morton Marcus.

== Bibliography ==
Morton Marcus published eleven volumes of poetry.

- Origins (6 editions 1969–1974)
- The Santa Cruz Mountain Poems (3 editions 1972–1992)
- Where the Oceans Cover Us (1972)
- Armies Encamped in the Fields Beyond the Unfinished Avenues (1977)
- Big Winds, Glass Mornings, Shadows Cast by Stars (2 editions 1981–1988)
- Pages from a Scrapbook of Immigrants (1988)
- When People Could Fly (1997)
- Shouting Down the Silence: Verse Poems, 1988–2001 (pub. 2002)
- Moments Without Names: New & Selected Prose Poems (2002)
- Pursuing The Dream Bone (2007)
- The Dark Figure in the Doorway: Last Poems (2010).

In addition to poetry, Morton Marcus also authored The Brezhnev Memo (1980) a novel, and Striking Through The Masks: A Literary Memoir (2008). Marcus also translated the works of Serbian poet Vasko Popa in The Star Wizard's Legacy (2010).
