= Srba Mitrović =

Serbian poet, translator and librarian (1931–2007)

Srba Mitrović (Serbian-Cyrillic: Срба Митровић; 23 December 1931 in Lalinac (Svrljig), Yugoslavia – 1 February 2007 in Belgrade) was a Serbian poet, translator and librarian.

== Life and work ==
Mitrović attended the primary school in Pirot and Niš, and the secondary school (gymnasium) in Niš and Belgrade with maturity diploma in 1952, then he studied with focus on English-speaking literature at the former Department of Yugoslav and World Literature of the Philological Faculty of Belgrade’s University and graduated with diploma in 1962. During his study time, he worked for the companies Intercont and Jugoelektro in Belgrade, and completed his military service in Yugoslav Army. After completion of his academic education, he became teacher for Serbo-Croatian language and literature at the care facility for children and adolescents (Prihvatilište za decu i omladinu), in which he taught young people who were victims of domestic violence, maltreatment, abuse and neglect from 1963 to 1964, then he worked as librarian at the school library of Zemun Gymnasium until his retirement in 1985.

In 1970, he began to publish his first poems, and numerous book editions of his poetry have been published over the course of the following years, additionally more than 400 publications in Serbian literary journals such as Letopis Matice srpske (Chronicle of Serbian Matica), Književne novine (Literary News), Sveske (Notebooks), Polja (Fields) and many others, also in the Austrian literary journal Lichtungen selected poems in German translation. He translated poetry of Wystan Hugh Auden, Seamus Heaney and Philip Larkin into Serbian, also Haiku poetry of Yosa Buson and Matsuo Bashō in co-operation with Hiroshi Yamasaki Vukelić (son of Branko Vukelić). Some of his poems are available in an anthology of Serbian poetry in English translation, compiled by Gojko Božović and edited by Serbian PEN in 2006. Tanja Kragujević commemorates his life and work in an essay on her Website, and recalls his significance for contemporary Serbian poetry.

== Bibliography (selection) ==
- Metastrofe: pesme (Metastrophes: poems), Nolit, Belgrade 1972.
- Opkoračenja (Enjambments), poetry, Matica srpska, Novi Sad 1975.
- Šuma koja lebdi (Floating Forest), poetry, Matica srpska, Novi Sad 1991, ISBN 86-363-0217-X.
- Antologija engleske poezije: 1945-1990 (Anthology of English poetry: 1945-1990), compiled and partially translated by Srba Mitrović, Svetovi, Novi Sad 1992, ISBN 86-7047-165-5.
- Žaoba (Mourning), Svetovi, Novi Sad 1993, ISBN 86-7047-201-5.
- Antologija američke poezije: 1945-1994 (Anthology of American Poetry: 1945-1994), compiled and partially translated by Srba Mitrović, Svetovi, Novi Sad 1994, ISBN 86-7047-133-7.
- Snimci za panoramu (Recordings for Panorama), poetry, Matica srpska, Novi Sad 1996, ISBN 86-363-0367-2.
- Uzmicanje: kasne pesme (Retreat: late poems), Rad, Belgrade 1999, ISBN 86-09-00599-2.
- Izabrane: 1970-2003 (Selected: 1970-2003), poetry Draslar, Belgrade 2003, ISBN 86-7614-015-4.
- Gozba (Feast), poetry, Narodna knjiga - Alfa, Belgrade 2004, ISBN 86-331-1545-X.
- S Kalemegdana: jesenja haiku slikovnica (From Kalemegdan: autumnal Haiku picture book), Otkrovenje, New Belgrade 2006, ISBN 978-86-83353-40-8.
- Magline, sazvežđa: snovidne mape (Nebulas, Constellations: Superficial Maps), poetry, Rad, Belgrade 2007, ISBN 978-86-09-00950-1.

== Awards ==
- Milan Rakić Award 1991 for Šuma koja lebdi
- Miloš N. Đurić Award 1993 for Antologija engleske poezije: 1945-1990
- Branko Miljković Award 1996 for Snimci za panoramu
- Isidora Sekulić Award 1996 for Snimci za panoramu
- Zmaj Award 1999 for Uzmicanje
- Award of the Association of Serbian Literary Translators for his complete work of translations 2001
