= Grebenac =

Grebenac Гребенац (Serbian) Grebenaț (Romanian)
- Village (Selo)
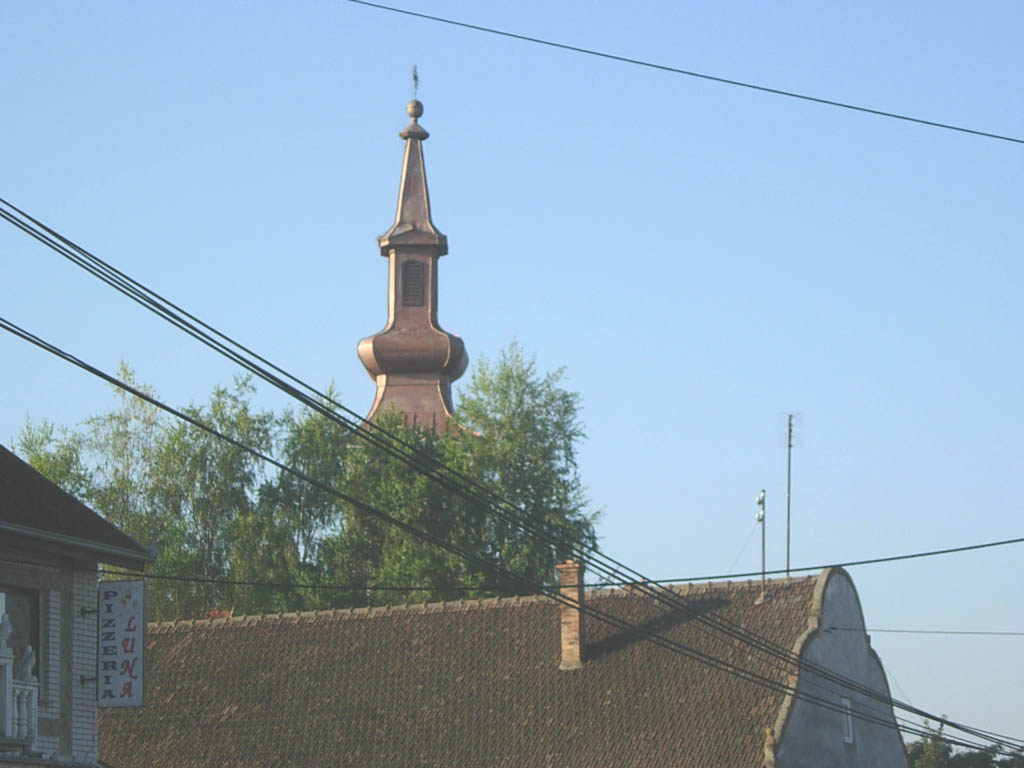
- The Romanian Orthodox Church

- Location of Grebenac within Serbia Grebenac (Serbia) Grebenac (Europe)
- Coordinates: 44°52′21″N 21°15′11″E
- Country: Serbia
- Province: Vojvodina
- District: South Banat
- Municipality: Bela Crkva
- Elevation: 60 m (200 ft)

Population (2022)
  - Total: 599
- Time zone: UTC+1 (CET)
  - Summer (DST): UTC+2 (CEST)
- Postal code: 26347
- Area code: +381(0)13
- Car plates: VŠ

Grebenac (Serbian Cyrillic: Гребенац, Romanian: Grebenaț) is a village located in the Bela Crkva municipality, South Banat District, Vojvodina, Serbia. The village has a population of 599 people (2022 census).

== Name ==
In Serbian, the village is known as Grebenac (Гребенац), in Romanian as Grebenaț, in Hungarian as Gerebenc, and in German as Grebenatz.

== History ==
In 1970s some 490 residents of Grebenac went abroad as gastarbeiters, mostly to Salzburg where there was some 300 of them.

== Demographics ==
=== Historical population ===
- 1961: 2,129
- 1971: 2,040
- 1981: 1,893
- 1991: 1,608
- 2002: 1,017
- 2022: 599

=== Ethnic groups ===
According to data from the 2022 census, ethnic groups in the village include:

- 425 (70.9%) Romanians
- 109 (18.2%) Serbs
- Others/Undeclared/Unknown

== Notable people ==
- Vasko Popa, poet

== See also ==
- List of places in Serbia
- List of cities, towns and villages in Vojvodina
