= Desanka Maksimović Prize =

Annual poetry award

- Nagrada Desanka Maksimović
- Awarded for: Poetry
- Date: 16 May
- Location: Brankovina
- Country: Serbia
- Presented by: Zadužbina Desanke Maksimović ("Desanka Maksimović Foundation")
- First award: 1994

Desanka Maksimović Prize is an annual literary award for overall contribution to Serbian poetry, granted by Zadužbina Desanke Maksimović (Desanka Maksimović Foundation).

== History ==
Zadužbina Desanke Maksimović was founded to honor the legacy of Desanka Maksimović, shortly after her passing in early 1993, by the National Library of Serbia and the city of Valjevo. The poetry prize was established as an integral part of the foundation a few months later, and first awarded in 1994.

The prize is presented at a ceremony traditionally held on Maksimović's birthday, May 16, during the literary event Desankini majski razgovori (Desanka’s May Conversations).

The prize includes a bronze statue, a charter written in calligraphic script and a financial part. Additionally, Zadužbina Desanke Maksimović organizes a conference dedicated to the winner’s poetry, and publishes a collection of academic papers about the winner’s work.

== Recipients ==
The following is a list of recipients of the Desanka Maksimović Prize for each year:

- 1994 — Ljubomir Simović
- 1995 — Stevan Raičković
- 1996 — Miodrag Pavlović
- 1997 — Tanasije Mladenović
- 1998 — Matija Bećković
- 1999 — Milovan Danojlić
- 2000 — Branislav Petrović
- 2001 — Borislav Radović
- 2002 — Slobodan Rakitić
- 2003 — Radmila Lazić
- 2004 — Milosav Tešić
- 2005 — Novica Tadić
- 2006 — Alek Vukadinović
- 2007 — Slobodan Zubanović
- 2008 — Miroslav Maksimović
- 2009 — Rajko Petrov Nogo
- 2010 — Mirjana Stefanović
- 2011 — Duško Novaković
- 2012 — Vladimir Kopicl
- 2013 — Milan Đorđević
- 2014 — Petar Pajić
- 2015 — Tanja Kragujević
- 2016 — Mošo Odalović
- 2017 — Milan Nenadić
- 2018 — Ana Ristović
- 2019 — Vojislav Karanović
- 2020 — Tomislav Marinković
- 2021 — Saša Radojčić
- 2022 — Živorad Nedeljković
- 2023 — Zlata Kocić
- 2024 — Nikola Vujčić
- 2025 — Dragan Jovanović Danilov
