= Stevan Raičković =

Serbian poet, writer and academic (1928–2007)

Stevan Raičković Стеван Раичковић
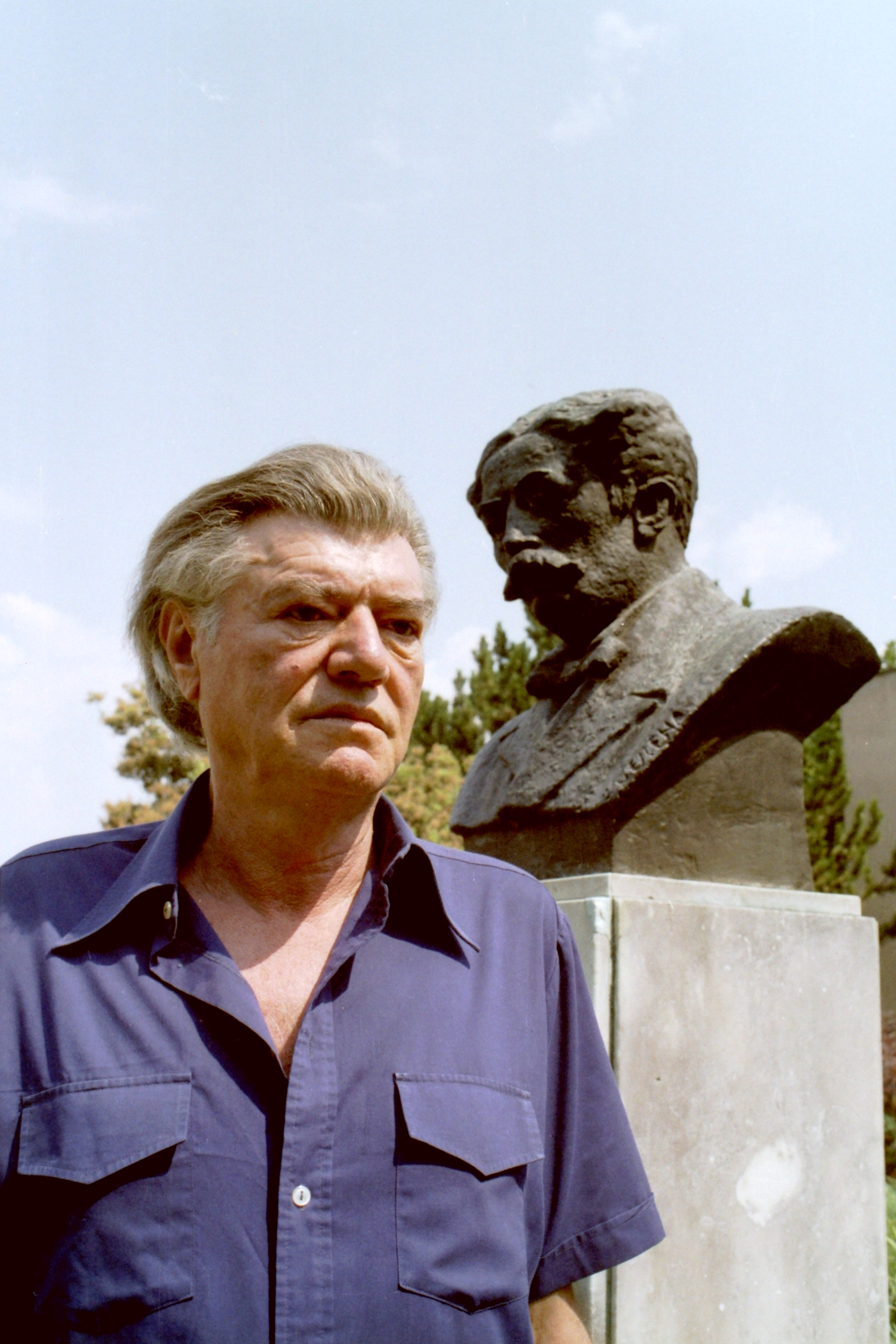
- Raičković in 1995
- Born: 5 July 1928; Neresnica, Kingdom of Serbs, Croats and Slovenes
- Died: 6 May 2007 (aged 78); Belgrade, Serbia
- Resting place: Belgrade New Cemetery
- Education: University of Belgrade
- Occupations: Poet, writer
- Writing career
- Language: Serbian
- Notable work: Kamena uspavanka

Stevan Raičković (Serbian Cyrillic: Стеван Раичковић; 5 July 1928 – 6 May 2007) was a Serbian poet, writer and academic.

== Biography ==
Raičković was born into a family of teachers that moved a lot around the country as he was growing up. He pursued his gymnasium education in Senta, Kruševac, Smederevo and Subotica, where he graduated in 1947 and started writing for various newspapers at the age of 17 including Politika. Soon after Raičković started his studies at Belgrade Faculty of Philosophy. His first job was at the redaction of Radio Belgrade and afterwards as an editor in Prosveta publishing house.

He was elected as a corresponding member of the Serbian Academy of Sciences and Arts in 1972 and a full member nine years later. Some of his awards include: Zmajeva, Neven, Njegoševa, Goranov venac, Branko Miljković award for poetry, Desanka Maksimović award for poetry, Vasko Popa award for poetry, Miloš N. Djurić award for the best translation, Vuk's award, the 7 July award, October award of cities of Belgrade and Herceg-Novi.

Raičković translated numerous poets including Anna Akhmatova, Marina Tsvetaeva, Joseph Brodsky, Boris Pasternak, Shakespeare's sonnets and Petrarch.

His collected works were published in 1998 and translated in more than 10 languages.

== Works ==
- Detinjstva (1950)
- Pesma tišine (1952)
- Balada o predvečerju (1955)
- Kasno leto (1958)
- Tisa (1961)
- Kamena uspavanka (1963)
- Stihovi (1964)
- Prolazi rekom lađa (1967)
- Varke (1967)
- Zapisi (1971)
- Zapisi o crnom Vladimiru (1971)
- Slučajni memoari (1978)
- Točak za mučenje (1981)
- Panonske ptice (1988)
- Monolog na Topoli (1988)
- Svet oko mene (1988)
- Stihovi iz dnevnika (1990)
- Fascikla 1999/2000 (2004)
- Čarolija o Herceg-Novom (1989)
- Suvišna pesma (1991)
- Kineska priča (1995)
- Intimne mape (1978)
- Zlatna greda (1993)
- Beleške o poeziji (1978)
- Portreti pesnika (1987)
- Dnevnik o poeziji (1990)
- Dnevnik o poeziji II (1997)
- Nulti ciklus (1998)
- U društvu pesnika (2000)
- Slova i besede (2000)
- Linija magle (2001)
- Monolog o poeziji (2001)
- Veliko dvorište (1955)
- Družina pod suncem (1960)
- Gurije (1962)
- Krajcara i druge pesme (1971)
- Vetrenjača (1974)
- Male bajke (1974)
- Slike i prilike (1978)
- Selidba (1983)
- Jedan mogući život (Homo poeticus) (2002)

=== Translations ===
- Shakespeare's sonnets (1964)
- Six Russian poets (1970)
- Love sonnets – Petrarch (1974)
- Slovenske rime (1976)
- Zlatna jesen – selection of poetry by Boris Pasternak (1990)
