= Serbian Literary Herald =

Serbian literary journal

The Serbian Literary Herald (Serbian: Српски књижевни гласник, romanized: Srpski književni glasnik) was a Belgrade-based literary journal published in the first half of the 20th century. It was founded in February 1901, following the merger of the journals "Artwork" (Delo) and "Serbian Review" (Srpski pregled). The Herald was the most influential Serbian literary journal of its time. Most influential Serbian writers had their works published in the journal, which also printed literary, theatrical and cinematic reviews. It went on hiatus for the duration of World War I but resumed publishing once peace was restored. It continued publishing issues throughout the German occupation of Serbia during World War II. Once the occupation ended, the Herald – which had never been a propagator of left-wing views – came to be viewed with suspicion by Yugoslavia's new communist authorities. In 1945–46, all issues published by the Herald during the German occupation were destroyed by the communists.

== Bibliography ==
- Đorđević, Mihailo (1981). "Srpski književni glasnik: Its Impact on Serbian Early Twentieth-Century Literature" (PDF). Journal of the North American Society for Serbian Studies. 1 (2). Bloomington, Indiana: Slavica Publishers: 67–73. ISSN 0742-3330.
- Miller, Nicholas J. (1997). Between Nation and State: Serbian Politics in Croatia Before the First World War. Pittsburgh: University of Pittsburgh Press.
- Miller, Nick (2007). The Nonconformists: Culture, Politics, and Nationalism in a Serbian Intellectual Circle, 1944–1991. Budapest: Central European University Press. ISBN 978-9-63977-613-5.
- Norris, David A. (2008). Belgrade: A Cultural History. Oxford: Oxford University Press. ISBN 978-0-19-970452-1.
- Pavlowitch, Stevan K. (2002). Serbia: The History of an Idea. New York: New York University Press. ISBN 978-0-8147-6708-5.
- Wachtel, Andrew Baruch (1998). Making a Nation, Breaking a Nation: Literature and Cultural Politics in Yugoslavia. Stanford, California: Stanford University Press. ISBN 978-0-80473-181-2.
