= Desanka Maksimović =

Twentieth-century Serbian poet

- Десанка Максимовић
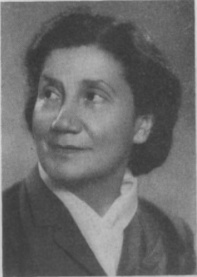
- Born: 16 May 1898; Rabrovica, Kingdom of Serbia
- Died: 11 February 1993 (aged 94); Belgrade, FR Yugoslavia (modern Serbia)
- Resting place: Holy Archangels Church, Brankovina
- Citizenship: (Kingdom of Serbia) 1898-1918 (Kingdom of Yugoslavia) 1918-1941 (Socialist Republic of Serbia) 1945-1993 All three are now modern day Serbia
- Education: University of Belgrade; University of Paris
- Occupations: Poet, writer, translator
- Spouse: Sergej Slastikov (1933–1970)
- Writing career
- Language: Serbian Language
- Period: 1920–1993
- Notable work: Krvava Bajka

Desanka Maksimović (Serbian Cyrillic: Десанка Максимовић; 16 May 1898 – 11 February 1993) was a Serbian poet, writer and translator. Her first works were published in the literary journal Misao in 1920, while she was studying at the University of Belgrade. Within a few years, her poems appeared in the Serbian Literary Herald, Belgrade's most influential literary publication. In 1925, Maksimović earned a French Government scholarship for a year's study at the University of Paris. Upon her return, she was appointed a professor at Belgrade's elite First High School for Girls, a position she would hold continuously until World War II.

In 1933, Maksimović married Sergej Slastikov, a Russian émigré writer. After being dismissed from her post at the high school by the Germans in 1941, she was reduced to a state of poverty and forced to work odd jobs to survive the three-and-a-half year occupation. She was only permitted to publish children's literature during this period, but secretly compiled a collection of patriotic poems, which were not published until after the war. Among these was Krvava bajka (A Bloody Tale), about the Wehrmacht's killing of schoolchildren in the Kragujevac massacre. It was recited extensively in post-war commemorative ceremonies and became one of the best known Serbian-language poems.

To mark her 60th birthday, Maksimović was named the recipient of a string of honours and awards in 1958. In 1964, she published one of her most acclaimed works, a volume of reflective poetry entitled Tražim pomilovanje (I Seek Clemency) in which the poet addresses the Serbian Emperor Dušan and conducts a lyrical discussion about his legal code. The following year, she became a full-fledged member of the Serbian Academy of Sciences and Arts. Following her husband's death in 1970, Maksimović's poetry increasingly began to revolve around the subject of human mortality. Maksimović travelled extensively in the 1970s and 1980s, and some of her visits abroad inspired several of her works. She became involved in efforts to combat government censorship in the early 1980s and was active until her death in 1993.

Maksimović was the first female Serbian poet to gain widespread acceptance within Yugoslav literary circles and among the general public. One literary scholar notes that she served as an example for other Serbian women wishing to take up the craft. Maksimović's reputation, which was such that most of her contemporaries referred to her simply by her first name, has led one author to describe her as "the most beloved Serbian poet of the twentieth century".

== Biography ==
=== Childhood ===
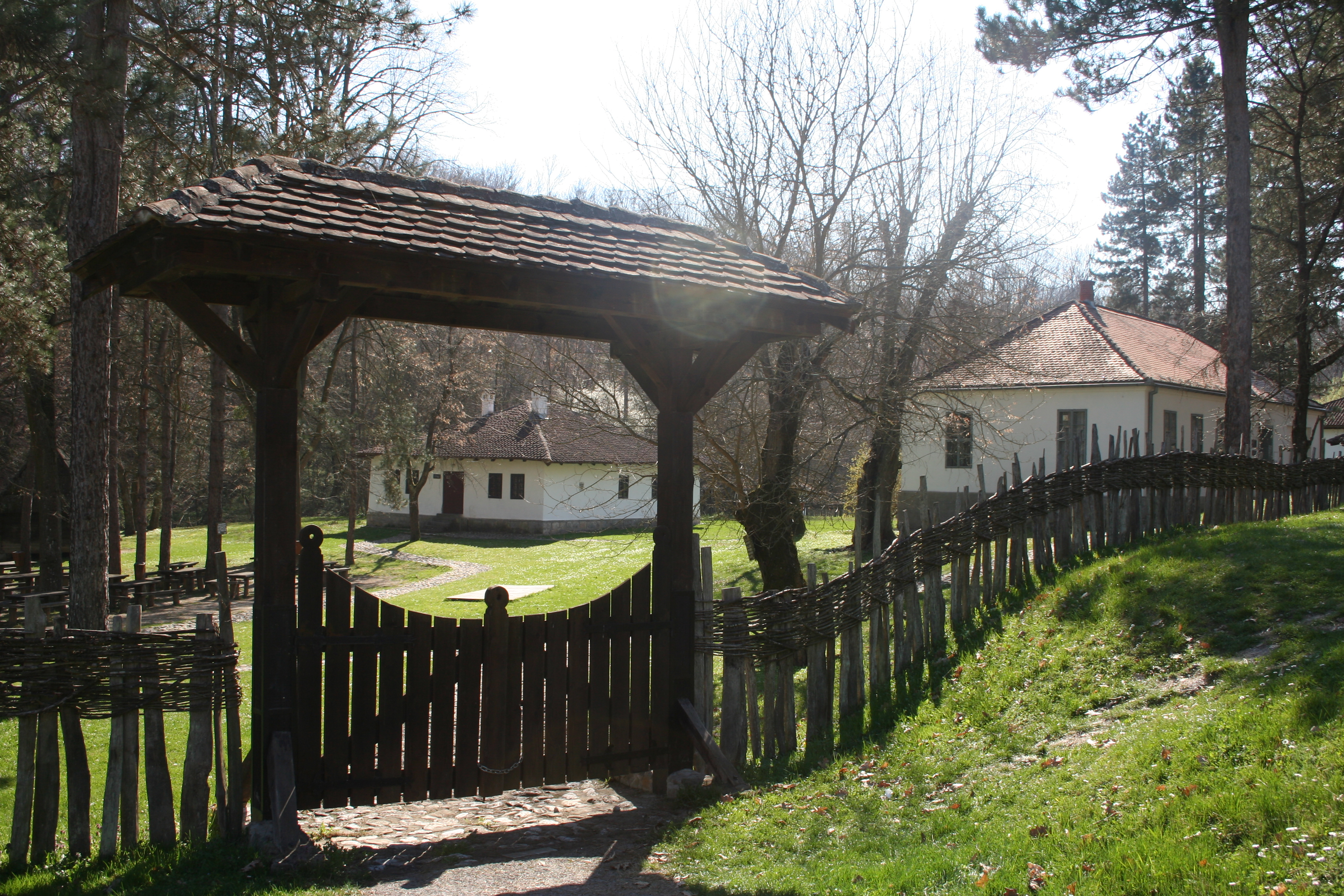
Maksimović spent much of her childhood in Brankovina

Desanka Maksimović was born in the village of Rabrovica, near Valjevo, on 16 May 1898. She was the oldest of her parents' seven children. Her father Mihailo was a schoolteacher and her mother Draginja (née Petrović) was a housewife. Maksimović's ancestors had migrated to Serbia from Herzegovina in the late 18th century. Her maternal grandfather was an Eastern Orthodox priest. Within two months of her birth, her father was reassigned to the nearby village of Brankovina, and the family had to relocate. Maksimović spent much of her early childhood in Brankovina. She took an interest in reading at an early age, spending hours in her father's library. When she was 10, the family moved to Valjevo. Maksimović's family was devastated by World War I. In 1915, she lost her father to typhus while he was serving in the Royal Serbian Army. Her father's death thrust the family into difficult financial straights. In order to be able to take care of her mother and her siblings, Maksimović was forced to drop out of high school. In her free time, she learned French. She re-enrolled after the war and completed her secondary education in 1919.

=== Early career ===
Upon completing high school, Maksimović moved to Belgrade, the capital of the newly formed Kingdom of Serbs, Croats and Slovenes. She enrolled in the University of Belgrade, and took courses in art history and comparative literature. By this time, Maksimović had been writing verse for a number of years. She gave some of her poems to one of her former professors, who in turn gave them to Velimir Masuka, the editor-in-chief of Misao (Thought), one of Serbia's leading artistic and literary publications.

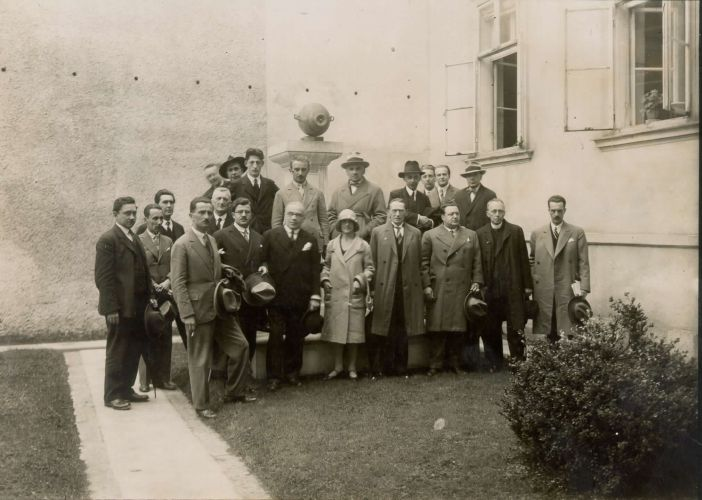
Maksimović (front row, centre) at a meeting of Yugoslav writers in 1929

Maksimović's poetry first appeared in Misao between 1920 and 1921. She received what was to be the first of many literary awards when one of her poems was voted to be the journal's best by its readers. Within a few years, the Srpski književni glasnik (Serbian Literary Herald), then Belgrade's most influential and respected literary journal, began printing her poems, and several of her works appeared in an anthology of Yugoslav lyric poetry. In 1924, Maksimović published her first poetry collection, simply entitled Pesme (Poems). The collection was met with positive reviews. Maksimović graduated from the University of Belgrade around this time and received a fellowship from the Government of France for a year's study at the University of Paris. She returned to Belgrade in 1925, and upon her return, received a Saint Sava medal from the government for her literary achievements and became a professor at the city's elite First High School for Girls.

By the late 1920s, the Kingdom of Serbs, Croats and Slovenes was mired by ethnic tensions. In 1929, King Alexander decreed that it be renamed Yugoslavia to mitigate growing nationalist resentment. Before long, the country's political disputes spilled over into literary discourse. Yugoslav writers could not agree on the political and artistic direction Yugoslav literature should take. Older writers favoured abiding by existing literary norms while younger ones promoted modernism as a means of explaining the contradictions of modern life and exploring the human subconscious. Maksimović's steadfast refusal to deviate from traditional literary forms and traditions prompted scathing critiques from many of her colleagues in the Yugoslav literary establishment. She would later note: "I would not have had as many friends as I have now if I had not been able to forget the biting jokes or critical remarks about my poetry or myself." Yugoslavia had to endure difficult economic conditions during the Great Depression and the country's political landscape deteriorated further. During this time, Maksimović made poetry the main focus of her writing. Many of her poems were first recited before her fellow writers in the home of Smilja Đaković, the publisher of Misao. In 1933, Maksimović married a Russian-born writer named Sergej Slastikov.

Following the German-led Axis invasion and subsequent occupation of Yugoslavia, Maksimović was forcibly retired from her teaching position at the First High School for Girls at the behest of the occupational authorities. Impoverished, she resorted to giving private lessons, sewing children's clothes and selling dolls in the marketplace. In order to heat her apartment, Maksimović had to walk from downtown Belgrade to Mount Avala to collect firewood. She wrote patriotic poems in secret during this time but was only allowed to publish children's books.

=== Later life ===
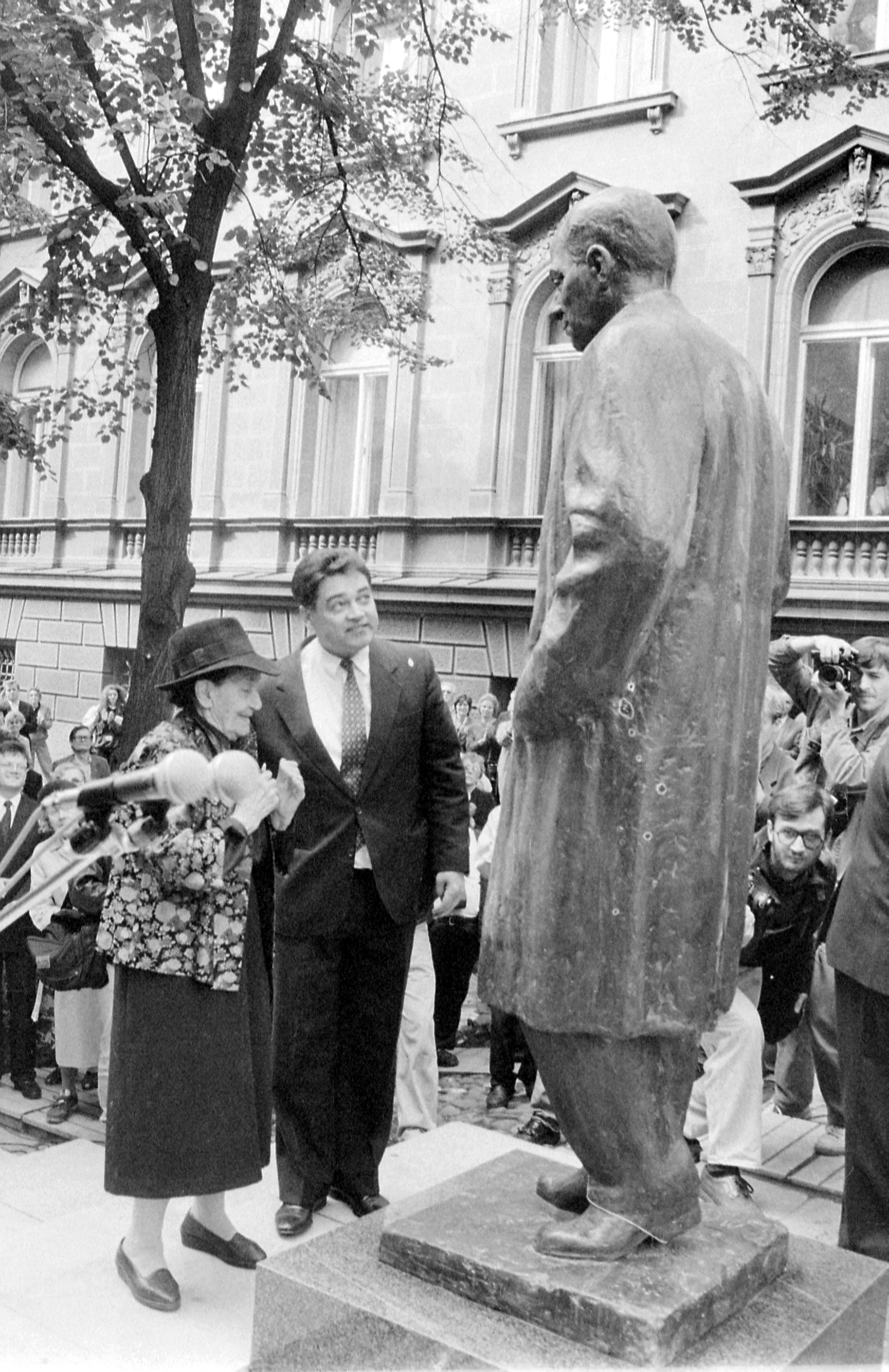
Maksimović attending a ceremony marking the 100th anniversary of Ivo Andrić's birth, October 1992

After the war, Yugoslavia became a socialist state under the leadership of Josip Broz Tito. Maksimović was reinstated as a professor at the First High School for Girls. In 1946, she published a collection of war poems titled Pesnik i zavičaj (The Poet and His Native Land). The collection contained one of her best known poems, Krvava bajka (A Bloody Fairy Tale), a requiem for the children killed in the Kragujevac massacre of October 1941. Although she was not a communist, her works received the approval of the Yugoslav government. Maksimović was a fervent Russophile, and at times, her Russophilia was mistaken for covert Cominformism, a serious charge in the years following the Tito–Stalin Split, that if proven, could have landed a person in prison. Maksimović retired from teaching in 1953. In 1958, to mark her 60th birthday, Maksimović received a number of awards from the Yugoslav government and literary establishment. The following year, she received partial membership in the Serbian Academy of Sciences and Arts (SANU).

In 1964, Maksimović published a volume of reflective poetry entitled Tražim pomilovanje (I Seek Clemency), which dealt with the 14th-century reign of Dušan the Mighty, the founder of the Serbian Empire. The collection was well received and quickly became a bestseller. Its veiled critique of Tito made it especially popular, especially among those frustrated with the Yugoslav government's increasing arbitrariness and corruption. Maksimović was the recipient of further honours over the next several years. In 1965, her colleagues voted to make her a full member of the SANU. By this time, Maksimović was not only well known and respected within Yugoslavia, but also abroad, with her works having been translated into dozens of languages. Among the translators of her works was the Russian poet Anna Akhmatova. In 1967, Maksimović was awarded a medal by the Supreme Soviet of the Soviet Union.

Maksimović's husband died in 1970. Following his death, her poems increasingly began to deal with the topic of human mortality. In 1975, she received a Vuk Karadžić Award for Lifetime Achievement from the SANU, becoming only the second writer to receive the honour, after Nobel laureate Ivo Andrić. The following year, Maksimović published Letopis Perunovih potomaka (A Chronicle of Perun's Descendants), a poetry collection dealing with medieval Balkan history. She travelled widely in the 1970s and 1980s, visiting many European nations, including the Soviet Union and the United Kingdom, but also Australia, Canada, the United States, and China. Her visits to Norway and Switzerland inspired the poetry collection Pesme iz Norveške (Poems from Norway; 1976) and a travel book titled Snimci iz Švajcarske (Snapshots from Switzerland; 1978). In 1982, Maksimović became one of the founding members of the Committee for the Protection of Artistic Freedom, which sought an end to government censorship. In 1988, she published a poetry collection titled Pamtiću sve (I Shall Remember Everything). She died in Belgrade on 11 February 1993, aged 94.

== Legacy ==
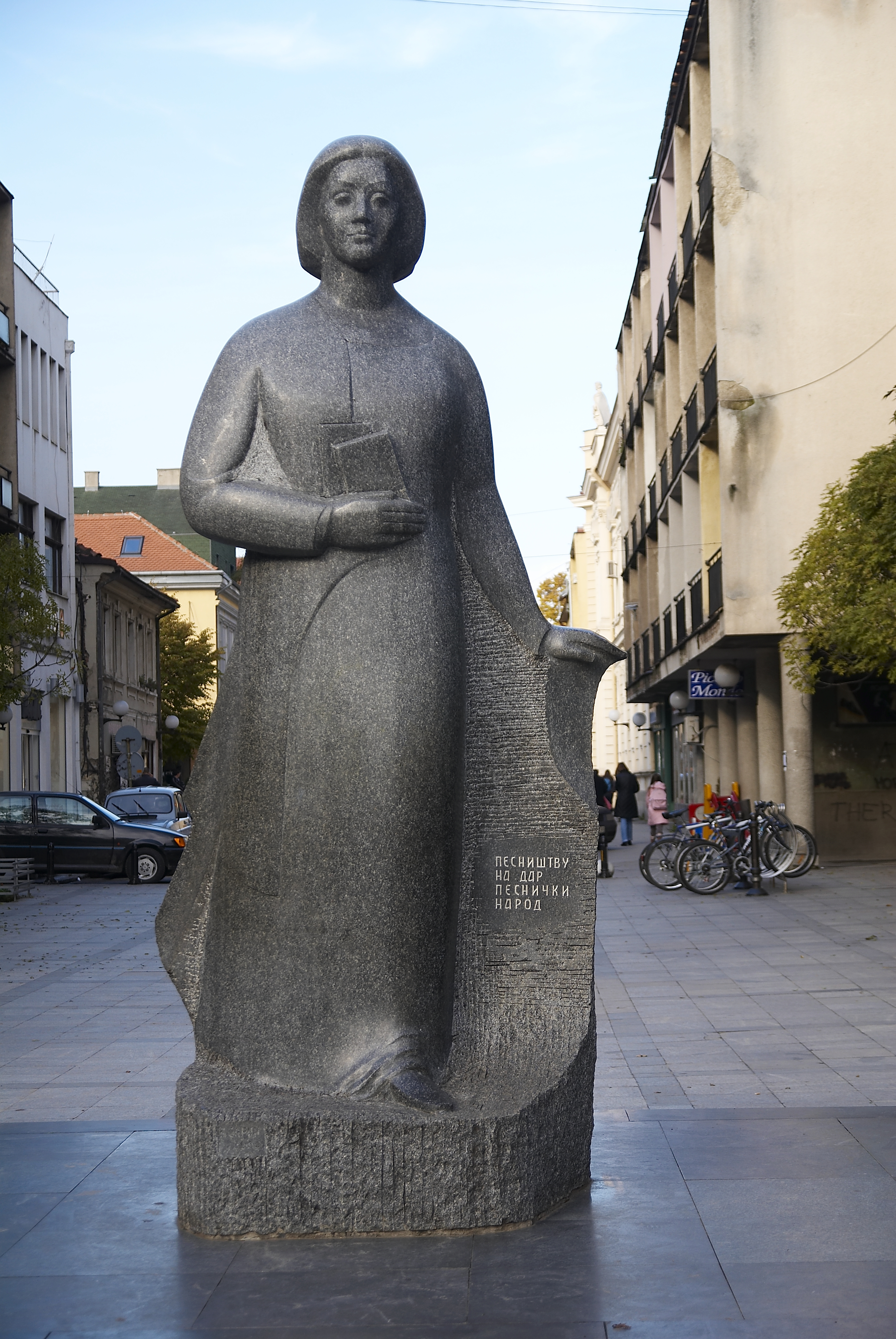
Statue in Valjevo

"Maksimović... marked a whole era with her lyrical poetry," the literary scholar Aida Vidan writes. She was the first female Serbian poet to gain widespread acceptance from her predominantly male colleagues within the Yugoslav literary milieu, as well as the first Serbian female poet to attract a significant following among the general public. She was Yugoslavia's leading female literary figure for seven decades, first acquiring this distinction during the interwar period and retaining it until her death. The scholar Dubravka Juraga describes her as "the beloved doyenne of Yugoslav belles lettres". Maksimović "offered women writers a model of achievement in the field of lyric poetry," the literary scholar Celia Hawkesworth writes. Hawkesworth compares Maksimović's contributions to Serbian literature to that of Elisaveta Bagriana in Bulgaria, Wisława Szymborska in Poland, and Nina Cassian in Romania. The author Christopher Deliso describes Maksimović as "the most beloved Serbian poet of the twentieth century". During her lifetime, her reputation was such that many of her contemporaries referred to her simply by her first name. Her poem Krvava bajka is widely considered one of the best known pieces of Serbian-language verse. She is also credited with popularizing love locks in the former Yugoslavia through one of her poems. By the early 2000s, the phenomenon had spread to other parts of the globe.

Serbian composer Mirjana Sistek-Djordjevic (born 1935) set poems from Maksimovic’s Trazim Pomilovanje to music in her composition for women’s chorus and orchestra. A statue of Maksimović was unveiled in Valjevo on 27 October 1990, while she was still alive.

Desanka Maksimović Prize was established to honor her legacy shortly after her passing, and has been awarded annually for overall contribution to Serbian poetry since 1994. The award ceremony is held during the literary event Desankini majski razgovori (Desanka’s May Conversations).

In the 1990s, as part of the renaming of communist-era street names following the breakup of Yugoslavia, Đuro Salaj Street in Belgrade was renamed Desanka Maksimović Street. In May 1996, the Federal Republic of Yugoslavia issued a commemorative postage stamp in her honour, while in 2023 the Republic of Serbia issued an additional stamp commemorating the 30th anniversary of her death. A bronze statue of Maksimović was erected in Belgrade's Tašmajdan Park on 23 August 2007.

== Works ==
Source: Sljivic-Simsic (1995, pp. 127–128)

- Pesme (1924)
- Vrt detinjstvа, poems (1927)
- Zeleni vitez, poems (1930)
- Ludilo srcа, short stories (1931)
- Srce lutke spаvаljke i druge priče za decu (1931, 1943)
- Gozbа na livаdi, poems (1932)
- Kаko oni žive, short stories (1935)
- Nove pesme (1936)
- Rаspevаne priče (1938)
- Zаgonetke lаke za prvаke đаke (with Jovаnkom Hrvаćаnin; 1942)
- Šаrena torbicа, children's poems (1943)
- Oslobođenje Cvete Andrić, poem (1945)
- Pesnik i zavičаj, poems (1945)
- Otаdžbina u prvomаjskoj povorci, poem (1949)
- Sаmoglаsnici A, E, I, O, U (1949)
- Otаdžbino, tu sаm (1951)
- Strаšna igrа, short stories (1950)
- Vetrovа uspаvаnkа (1953)
- Otvoren prozor, novel (1954)
- Prolećni sаstаnak (1954)
- Miris zemlje, selected poems (1955)
- Bаjkа o Krаtkovečnoj (1957)
- Ako je verovаti mojoj bаki, short stories (1959)
- Zаrobljenik snovа (1960)
- Govori tiho, poems (1961)
- Prolećni sаstаnak (1961)
- Pаtuljkovа tаjna, short stories (1963)
- Ptice na česmi, poems (1963)
- Trаžim pomilovаnje, lirskа diskusijа s Dušаnovim zakonikom (1964)
- Hoću dа se rаdujem, short stories (1965)
- Đаčko srce (1966)
- Izvolite na izložbu dece slikаrа (1966)
- Prаdevojčicа, novel (1970)
- Na šesnaesti rođendаn, poems (1970)
- Prаznici putovаnjа, travel writing (1972)
- Nemаm više vremena, poems (1973)
- Letopis Perunovih potomаkа, poems (1976)
- Pesme iz Norveške (1976)
- Bаjke za decu (1977)
- Snimci iz Švajcarske, travel book (1978)
- Ničijа zemljа (1979)
- Vetrovа uspаvаnkа, children's poems (1983)
- Međаši sećаnjа, poems (1983)
- Slovo o ljubаvi, poems (1983)
- Pаmtiću sve (1989)
- Nebeski rаzboj (1991)
- Ozon zavičаjа (1991)
- Zovina svirаlа (1992)
