= Miodrag Pavlović =

Serbian writer (1928–2014)

- Миодраг Павловић
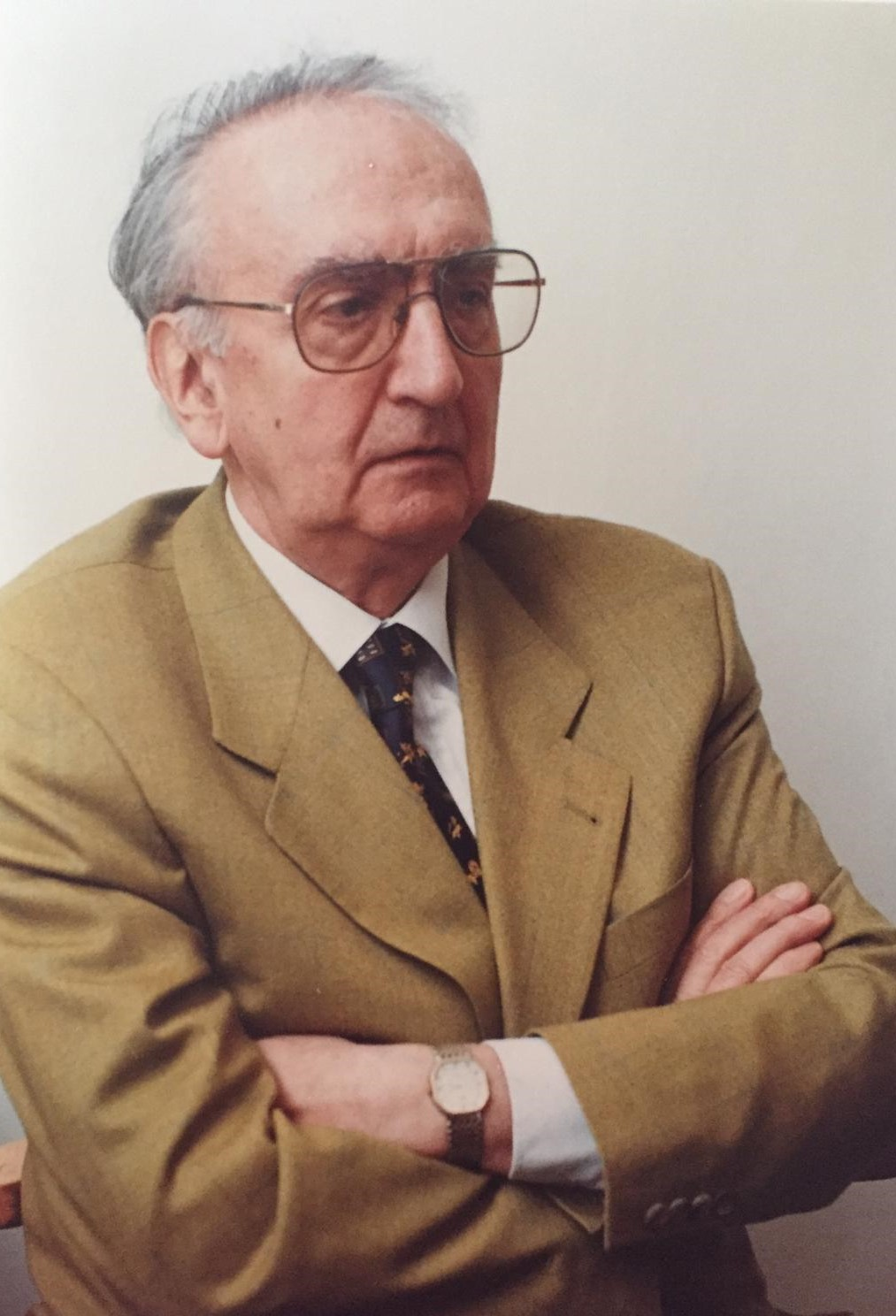
- Born: 28 November 1928; Novi Sad, Kingdom of Serbs, Croats and Slovenes (modern Serbia)
- Died: 17 August 2014 (aged 85); Tuttlingen, Germany
- Education: University of Belgrade

Miodrag Pavlović (Serbian Cyrillic: Миодраг Павловић;; 28 November 1928 – 17 August 2014) was a Serbian poet, physician writer, critic and academic. Pavlović was twice nominated for the Nobel Prize in Literature.

== Biography ==
He graduated from the University of Belgrade with a degree in medicine in 1954. He studied foreign languages and wrote his first volume of poetry, 87 Poems. It appeared in 1952, the year the Yugoslav authorities, responding to a public address by the Croatian writer Miroslav Krleža, allowed more freedom of expression in politics and the arts.

In 1960, Pavlović was appointed director of drama at the National Theatre in Belgrade. He also worked for twenty years as editor for the leading publishing house of Prosveta.

A theme occupying Pavlović and many other intellectuals in the former Yugoslavia, Romania, Bulgaria, Macedonia, Greece, and Albania is the continuity between the ancient peoples of the Balkans and their modern-day descendants. In Pavlović's work, as well as in that of the Macedonian poet Bogomil Gyuzel or the Albanian writer Ismail Kadare, there are frequent references to the ancient and medieval past. Among his historical poems, some of the most significant ones are 'Odisej na Kirkinom ostrvu' ('Odysseus on Circe's Island'), 'Eleuzijske seni' ('Elysian Shades'), 'Vasilije II Bugaroubica' ('Vasily II Bugaroctone') and 'Kosovo'.

These poems are often allegorical in nature, referring to our own times with their tales of manipulation, deceit, and especially fear. Written directly in the present are poems such as 'Prisoner' (untitled in the Serbian original), 'Requiem', 'Strah' ('Fear'), 'Pod zemljom' ('Under the Ground') and 'Kavge' ('Feuds').

In 2012, Pavlović was awarded the German literary prize Petrarca-Preis. His work has been widely translated. In the last years of his life, he lived alternately in Tuttlingen, Germany and Belgrade, Serbia.

A street in Belgrade is named after him.

== Awards ==
- European prize for poetry, city of Münster
- European prize for poetry, city of Vršac
- Struga Poetry Evenings award
- Vilenica Prize
- Petrarca-Preis
- Legion of Honour
- Order of St. Sava
- Ramonda Serbica
- Crown of despot Stefan Lazarević
- Tador Manojlović award
- Desanka Maksimović Prize
- Dis's award
- Odzivi Filipu Višnjiću award
- Stefan Prvovenčani admission
- Vuk's award
- Žička hrisovulja admission for poetry
- Branko Miljkovic award
- Zmaj's award
- Izviskra Njegoševa award, for life's work

== Works ==
=== In Serbian ===
Poetry:

- 87 pesama, Novo pokolenje, Beograd, 1952.
- Stub sećanja, Novo pokolenje, Beograd, 1953.
- Oktave, Nolit, Beograd, 1957.
- Mleko iskoni, Prosveta, Beograd, 1963.
- 87 pesama (izbor poezije), Nolit, Beograd, 1963.
- Velika Skitija, Svjetlost, Sarajevo, 1969.
- Nova Skitija, izd. časopisa "Književnost", Beograd, 1970.
- Hododarje, Nolit, Beograd, 1971.
- Svetli i tamni praznici, Matica srpska, Novi Sad, 1971.
- Velika Skitija i druge pesme (izabrane i nove pesme), SKZ, Beograd, 1972.
- Zavetine, Rad, Beograd, 1976.
- Karike, Svetlost, Kragujevac, 1977.
- Pevanja na Viru, Slovo ljubve, Beograd, 1977.
- Bekstva po Srbiji, Slovo ljubve, Beograd, 1979.
- 87 pesama, Dečje novine, Gornji Milanovac, 1979 (treće izdanje).
- Izabrane pesme, Rad, Beograd, 1979.
- Vidovnica, Narodna knjiga, Beograd, 1979.
- Poezija I i Poezija II, u okviru Izabranih dela Miodraga Pavlovića, "Vuk Karadžić", Beograd, 1981.
- Divno čudo, Nolit, Beograd, 1982.
- Zlatna zavada, Gradina, Niš, 1982.
- Sledstvo, SKZ, Beograd, 1985.
- Poezija, Prosveta, Beograd, 1986.
- Svetogorski dani i noći, Jedinstvo, Priština, 1987.
- Odbrana našeg grada, Smederevska pesnička jesen, Naš glas, Smederevo, 1989.
- Ulazak u Kremonu, Nolit, Beograd, 1989.
- Knjiga staroslovna, SKZ, Beograd, 1989; 1991 (drugo izdanje).
- Bezazlenstva, Milić Rakić, Valjevo, 1989.
- On, Bratstvo-jedinstvo, Novi Sad, 1989.
- Divno čudo, NIRO "Književne novine", Beograd, 1989 (drugo izdanje).
- Kosmologia profanata, Grafos, Beograd, 1990.
- Esej o čoveku, KOV, Vršac, 1992.
- Pesme o detinjstvu i ratovima, SKZ, Beograd, 1992.
- Knjiga horizonta, Prosveta, Beograd, 1993.
- Nebo u pećini, Krajinski književni krug, Negotin, 1993.
- Međustepenik, KOV, Vršac, 1994.
- Ulazak u Kremonu, GNB "Žarko Zrenjanin" i Zenit", Zrenjanin, 1995 (drugo izdanje).
- Bekstva po Srbiji i Sledstva, "Valjevska štamparija", Valjevo, 1995.
- Nebo u pećini, Disovo proleće, Čačak, 1996 (drugo izdanje).
- Izabrane i nove pesme, Prosveta, Beograd, 1996.
- Novo ime kletve, SKC, Beograd, 1996.
- Posvećenje pesme (izbor iz poezije), Prosveta, Niš, 1996.
- Izabrane pesme, Zavod za udžbenike i nastavna sredstva, Beograd, 1996.
- Velika Skitija i druge pesme (izabrane i nove pesme), SKZ, Beograd, 1996 (drugo izdanje).
- Srbija do kraja veka (izabrane pesme), Zadužbina Desanke Maksimović, Narodna biblioteka Srbije i SKZ, Beograd, 1996.

Prose:

- Most bez obala, Matica srpska, Novi Sad, 1956., 1982.
- Bitni ljudi, Prosveta, Beograd, 1995.

Essays:

- Rokovi poezije, SKZ, Beograd, 1958.
- Osam pesnika, Prosveta, Beograd, 1964.
- Dnevnik pene, Slovo ljubve, Beograd, 1972.
- Poezija i kultura, Nolit, Beograd, 1974.
- Poetika modernog, Grafos, Beograd, 1978. (nagrada "Đorđe Jovanović")
- Ništitelji i svadbari, BIGZ, Beograd, 1979.
- Nove slikarske godine Miće Popovića, "Merkur", Apatin, 1979.
- Eseji o srpskim pesnicima i Poetika modernog", Beograd, 1981.
- Prirodni oblik i lik, Nolit, Beograd, 1984.
- Slikarstvo Mladena Srbinovića, SANU, Beograd, 1985.
- Obredno i govorno delo, Prosveta, Beograd, 1986.
- Poetika žrtvenog obreda, Nolit, Beograd, 1987. (Nolitova nagrada)
- Govor o ničem, Gradina, Niš, 1987.
- Hram i preobraženje, Sfairos, Beograd, 1989.
- Čitanje zamišljenog, Bratstvo-jedinstvo, Novi Sad, 1990.
- Eseji o srpskim pesnicima, SKZ, Beograd, 1992.
- Ogledi o narodnoj i staroj srpskoj poeziji, SKZ, Beograd, 1993.
- Poetika žrtvenog obreda, SKC, Beograd, 1996 (drugo izdanje)

Dramas:

- Igre bezimenih, Prosveta, Beograd, 1963.
- Koraci u podzemlju, Matica srpska, Novi Sad, 1991.

Itineraries:

- Kina – oko na putu, izd. časopisa "Gradina", Niš, 1982, SKC, Beograd, 1995
- Putevi do hrama, Prosveta, Niš, 1991.
- Otvaraju se hilandarske dveri, Prosveta, Beograd, 1997.

Anthologies:

- Antologija moderne engleske poezije (sa Sv. Brkićem), Nolit, Beograd, 1957. i 1975.
- Antologija srpskog pesništva od XIII do XX veka, SKZ, Beograd, 1964.
- Pesništvo evropskog romantizma, Prosveta, Beograd, 1969., 1979.
- Antologija lirske narodne poezije, Vuk Karadžić, Beograd, 1982.; "Književne novine", Beograd, 1989.
- Boj na Kosovu, Narodne pesme, Prosveta, Niš, 1989.

=== In other languages ===
Books of poems:

- Sobowtóry, PIW, Warszava, 1964.
- Gedichte, Suhrkamp, Frankfurt am Main, 1968.
- La voix sous la pierre, Gallimard, Paris, 1970.
- Karanici, Misla, Skopje, 1971.
- Versuri, Editura Univers, București, 1972.
- Po~iatok básne, Slovensky spisovatel, Bratislava, 1973
- The Conqueror in Constantinople, New Rivers Press, New York, 1976.
- Svetli in temni prazniki, Dr`avna zalo`ba Slovenije, Ljubljana, 1977
- Pesmi, Mladinska knjiga, Ljubljana, 1977.
- Jasne i ciemne swieta, Wydawnictvo Literackie, Kraków, 1980.
- Tren wojownika, Wydawnictvo Łódzkie, Łódź, 1982.
- Singing at the Whirlpool, Exile Editions, Toronto, 1983
- The Slavs beneath Parnassus, Angel Books, New Rivers Press, London, 1985.
- A Voice Locked in Stone, Exile Editions, Toronto, 1985.
- Suite, Les Cahiers du Confluent, Montereau, 1986.
- Le miracle divin, Editions L'Age d'Homme, Lausanne, 1988
- Fényes és esötét ünnepek, Európa, Budapest, 1988.
- Gloria reversului, Libertatea, Novi Sad, 1989.
- Links, Exile Editions, Toronto, 1989.
- NoÈen polet, Narodna kultura, SofiÔ, 1989.
- Gesänge auf dem Wirbel, Hölderlinturm, Tübingen, 1990.
- Svetli i temni praznici, Makedonska kniga, Skopje, 1990.
- Die Tradition der Finsternis, ALKYON VERLAG, Weissach im Tal, 1994.
- Buch der Horizonte, Atempto Verlag, Tübingen, 1995.
- Selected Poems, Salt Publishing, Cromer, 2014.

Prose and other works:

- Kroky ve vedlejim pokoji, Odeon, Praha, 1967.
- Hid a sammibe, Europa K., Budapest, 1969.
- Mit i poezja, Wydawnictvo Literackie, Kraków, 1979
- Opfer und Tempel, Droschl Verlag, Graz-Wien, 1993.
