= Vasko Popa =

Serbian poet (1922–1991)

- Васко Попа
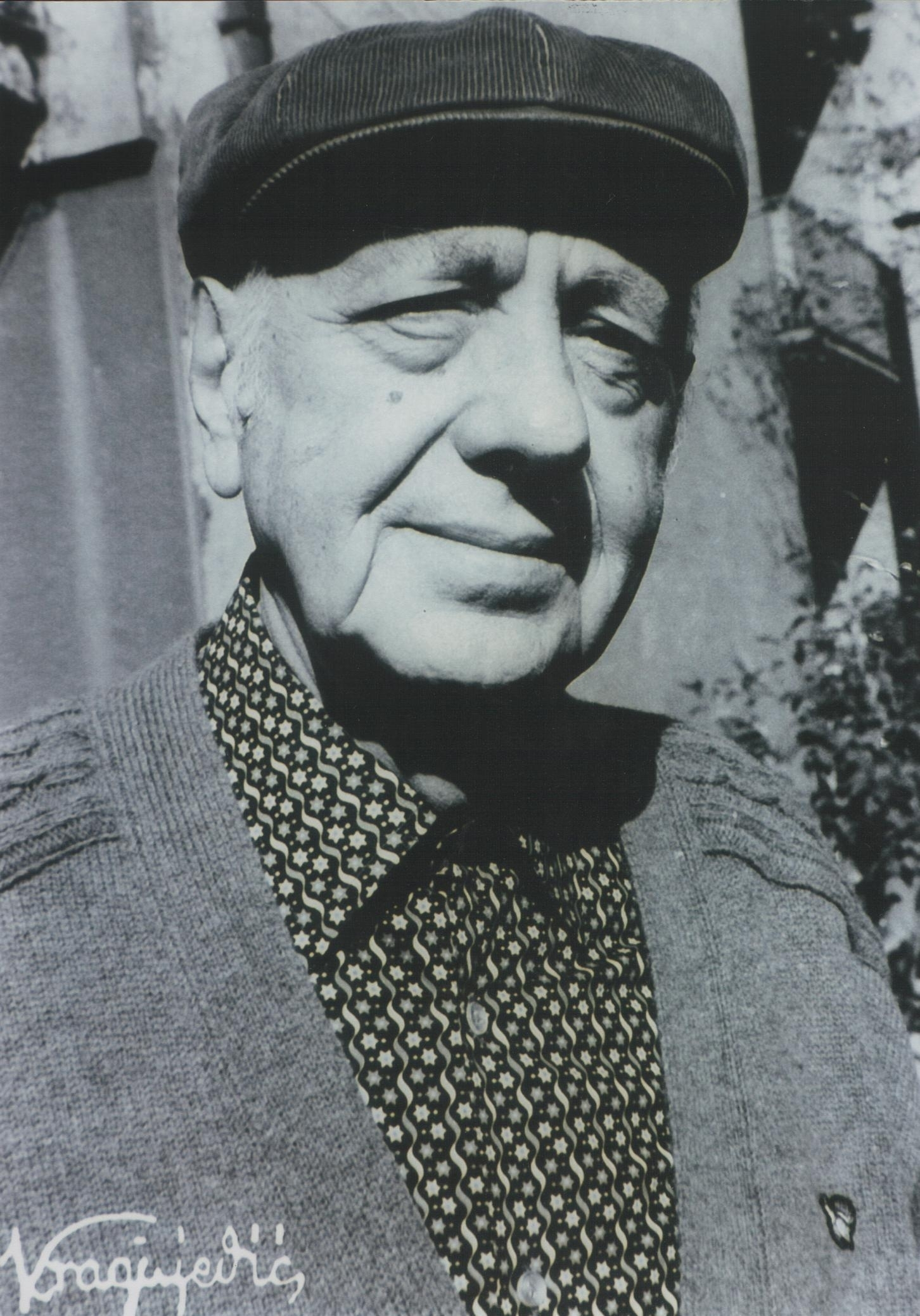
- Portrait of Popa by photographer Stevan Kragujević, 1990
- Born: 29 June 1922; Grebenac, Yugoslavia (now Serbia)
- Died: 5 June 1991 (aged 68); Belgrade, SR Serbia, Yugoslavia
- Occupations: poet, writer, editor, translator

Vasile "Vasko" Popa (Serbian Cyrillic: Васко Попа; 29 June 1922 – 5 January 1991) was a Yugoslav and Serbian poet of ethnic-Romanian heritage. He is regarded as one of 20th-century Yugoslavia's and Serbia's most important poets, and his work has been widely translated.

== Biography ==
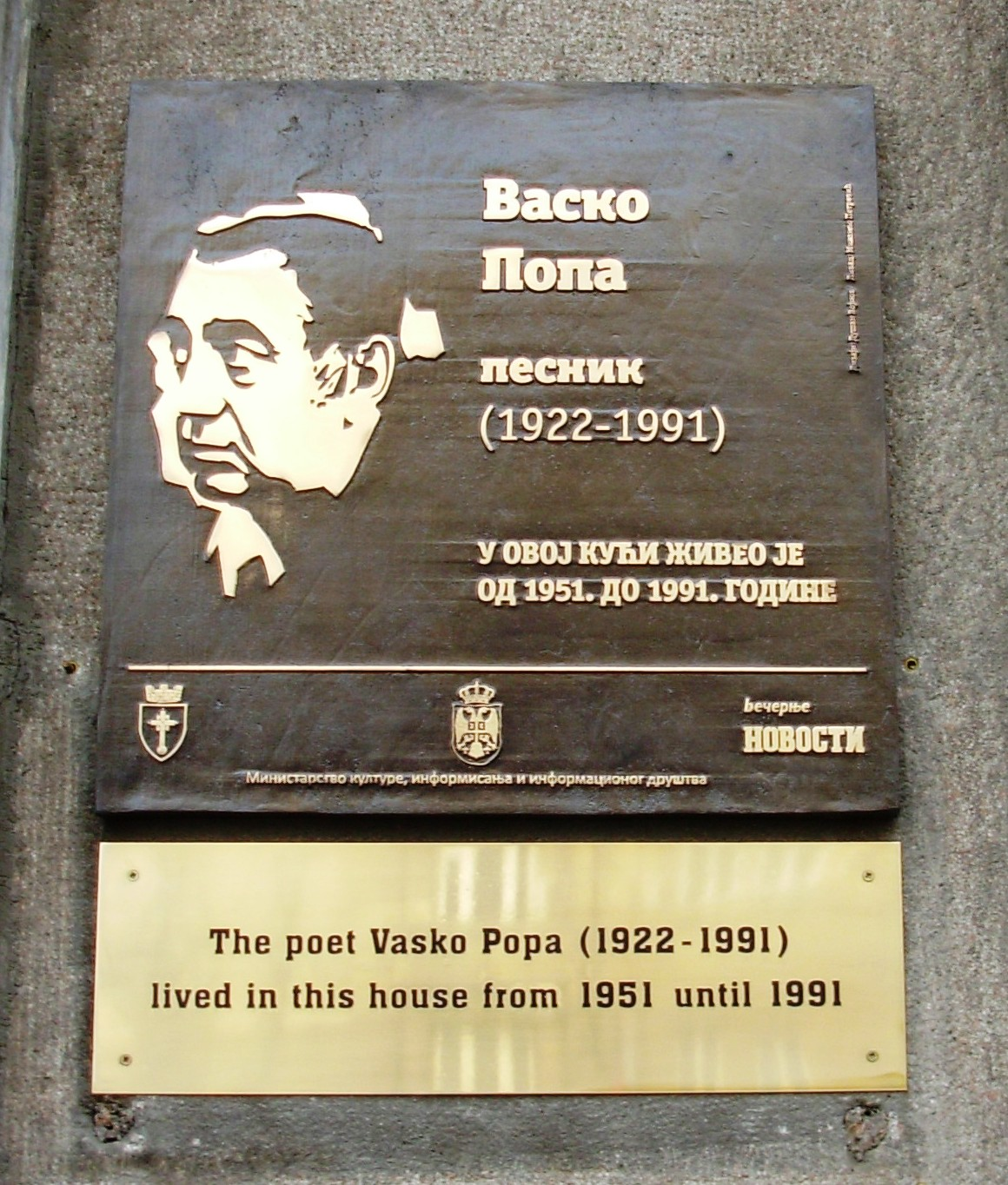
Васко Попа

Popa was born in the village of Grebenac (Romanian: Grebenaț), Yugoslavia (present-day Serbia) into a Banat Romanian family. Popa started writing while at high school. His first poems were written in Romanian. After finishing high school, he enrolled as a student at the University of Belgrade's Faculty of Philosophy. He continued his studies at the University of Bucharest and in Vienna. During World War II, he fought as a partisan and was imprisoned in a German concentration camp in Bečkerek (today's Zrenjanin, Serbia).

After the war in 1949, Popa graduated in Romance philology at Belgrade University. He published his first poems in the journal Književne novine (Literary News) and the newspaper Borba (Struggle).

From 1954 until 1979, he was the editor of the publishing house Nolit. In 1953 he published his first major verse collection, Kora (Bark). His other important work included Nepočin-polje (No-Rest Field, 1956), Sporedno nebo (Secondary Heaven, 1968), Uspravna zemlja (Earth Erect, 1972), Vučja so (Wolf Salt, 1975), and Od zlata jabuka (The Golden Apple, 1978), an anthology of Serbian folk literature. In English translation, his Collected Poems first appeared in 1978, with an introduction by the British poet Ted Hughes; the final edition, his Complete Poems, appeared in 2011.

In 1954, Vasko Popa was the inaugural winner of the Branko's Prize (Brankova nagrada) for poetry, established in honour of the poet Branko Radičević. In 1957 he won another poetry award, the Zmaj Prize (Zmajeva nagrada), which honours the poet Jovan Jovanović Zmaj. In 1965 Popa received the Austrian State Prize for European Literature. In 1976, he gained the Branko Miljković poetry award, in 1978 the Yugoslav state Anti-Fascist Council for the National Liberation of Yugoslavia Award, and in 1983 the Skender Kulenović Prize.

On 29th May 1972 Vasko Popa founded the Vršac Literary Municipality, plus Slobodno lišće (Free Leaves), a library of postcards. In the same year, he was elected as a member of the Serbian Academy of Sciences and Arts. Popa was also one of the founders of the Vojvodina Academy of Sciences and Arts, established on 14 December 1979 in Novi Sad.

Vasko Popa died on 5 January 1991 in Belgrade and was buried in the Aisle of Deserving Citizens in Belgrade's New Cemetery.

He was a good friend of French poet Alain Bosquet.

Popa was married to Jovanka "Haša" Singer from when he moved to Belgrade in the 1940s until the end of his life. In 2001, a year after her death, Hasha’s ashes were interred alongside Vasko’s remains.

== Style ==
Vasko Popa wrote in a succinct modernist style that owed much to surrealism and Serbian folk traditions (via the influence of Serbian poet Momčilo Nastasijević) - a style radically different from the Socialist Realism that dominated Eastern European literature after World War II. He created a unique poetic language, often elliptical, that combines a modern form, often expressed through colloquial speech and common idioms and phrases, with elmenents rooted in the Serbian oral tradition of epic and lyric folk poetry, tales, myths, riddles, etc. In his work, earthly and legendary motifs mix, myths come to surface from the collective subconscious, the inheritance and everyday are in constant interplay, and the abstract is reflected in the specific and concrete, forming a unique and extraordinary poetic dialectics.

In The New York Times obituary, the author mentions that the English poet Ted Hughes lauded Popa as an "epic poet" with a "vast vision". Hughes states in his introduction to Vasko Popa: Collected Poems 1943-1976, translated by Anne Pennington, "As Popa penetrates deeper into his life, with book after book, it begins to look like a universe passing through a universe. It is one of the most exciting things in modern poetry, to watch this journey being made."

Mexican poet and Nobel laureate Octavio Paz said, "Poets have the gift to speak for others, Vasko Popa had the very rare quality of hearing the others."

Popa's Collected Poems translation by Anne Pennington with its introduction by Hughes is part of "The Persea Series of Poetry in Translation," general editor Daniel Weissbort. Premiere literary critic John Bayley of Oxford University reviewed the book in The New York Review of Books and wrote that Popa was "one of the best European poets writing today."

Since his first book of verse, Kora (Bark), Vasko Popa has gained steadily in stature and popularity. His poetic achievement – eight volumes of verse written over a period of 38 years – has received extensive critical acclaim both in his native land and beyond. He is one of the most translated Serbian poets and at the time he had become one of the most influential World poets.

== Legacy ==
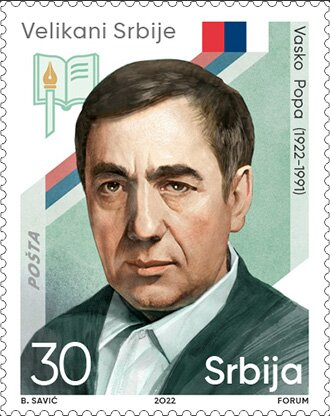
Popa on a 2022 stamp of Serbia

In 1964, composer Darinka Simic-Mitrovic used Vasko Popa's text for her song cycle Vrati Mi Moje Krpice.

In 1995, the town of Vršac established a poetry award named after Vasko Popa. It was awarded annually for the best book of poetry published in Serbian. The award ceremony is held on the day of Popa's birthday, 29 June.

== Works ==
=== Poetical oeuvre ===
- Kora (Bark), 1953
- Nepočin polje (No-rest Field),1965
- Sporedno nebo (Secondary Heaven), 1968
- Uspravna zemlja (Earth Erect) 1972
- Vučja so (Wolf's Salt), 1975
- Kuća nasred druma (Home in the Middle of the Road), 1975
- Živo meso (Raw Meat), 1975
- Rez (The Cut), 1981
- Gvozdeni sad (Iron Plantage), unfinished

=== Collections oeuvre ===
- Od zlata jabuka (Apple of Gold), a collection of folk poems, tales, proverbs, riddles, and curses selected from the vast body of Yugoslav folk literature, 1958
- Urnebesnik: Zbornik pesničkog humora (Pealing Man: Collection of poetic Humour), a selection of Serbian wit and humor, 1960
- Ponoćno Sunce (Midnight Sun), a collection of poetic dream visions, 1962

=== Major literary works available in English ===
- Vasko Popa (NYRB Poets), selected and translated by Charles Simic (NYRB, 2019), ISBN 978-1681373362
- Complete Poems., ed. Francis R. Jones, co-tr. Anne Pennington, introduction Ted Hughes. Anvil, 2011.
- The Star Wizard's Legacy: Six Poetic Sequences, trans. Morton Marcus (White Pine Press, 2010), ISBN 978-1-935210-11-5
- Collected Poems, Anvil Press Poetry, 1998
- Homage to the Lame Wolf: Selected Poems, trans. Charles Simic (Oberlin College Press, 1987), ISBN 0-932440-22-3
- Golden Apple, Anvil P Poetry, 1980
- Vasko Popa: Collected Poems 1943-1976, trans. Anne Pennington (Persea Books of New York, 1978)
- Earth Erect, Anvil P Poetry, 1973
